= North American Cordillera =

Group of mountain ranges

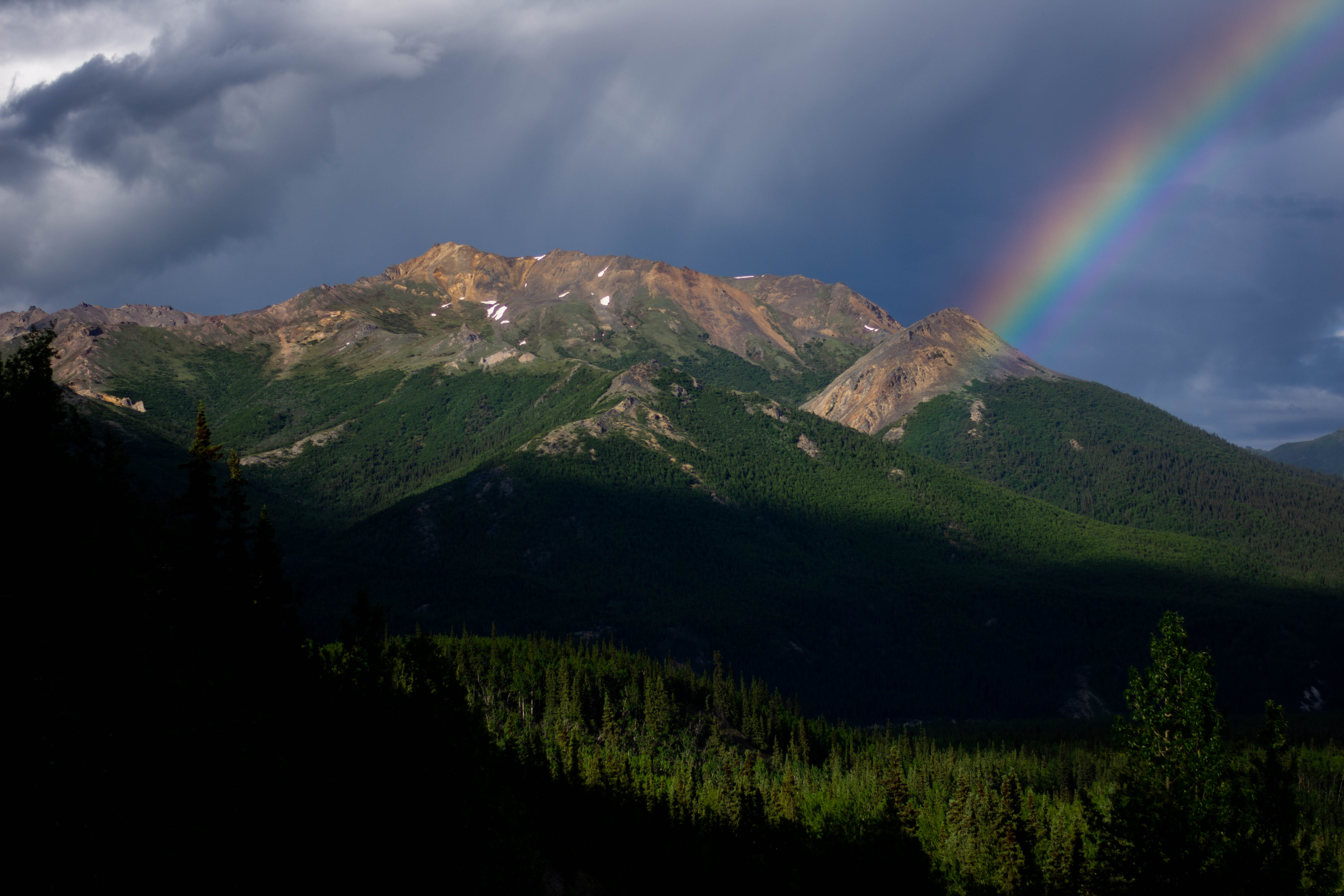
- A mountain in Denali National Park

Highest point
- Peak: Denali
- Elevation: 6,190 m (20,310 ft)

Dimensions
- Length: 6,400 km (4,000 mi)

Geography
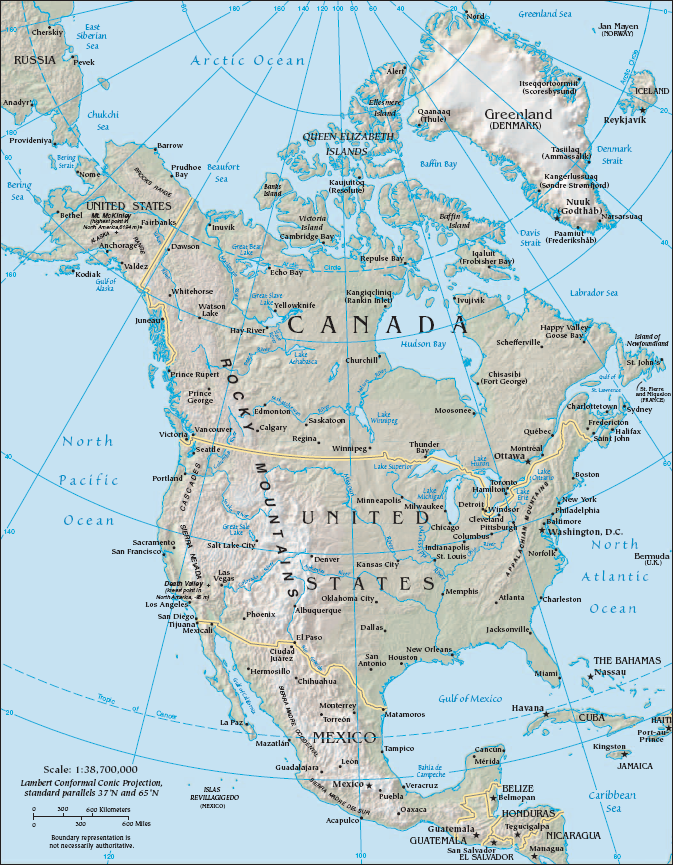
- The mountainous western part of North America is called "cordillera".
- Countries: Canada; United States; Mexico

The North American Cordillera, sometimes also called the Western Cordillera of North America, the Western Cordillera, or the Pacific Cordillera, is the North American portion of the American Cordillera, the mountain chain system along the Pacific coast of the Americas. The North American Cordillera covers an extensive area of mountain ranges, intermontane basins, and plateaus in Western and Northwestern Canada, Western United States, and Mexico, including much of the territory west of the Great Plains.

The precise boundaries of this cordillera and its subregions, as well as the names of its various features, may differ depending on the definitions in each country or jurisdiction, and also depending on the scientific field; this cordillera is a particularly prominent subject in the scientific field of physical geography.

== Major features ==
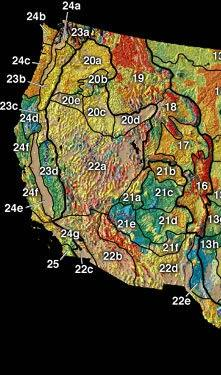
Physiographic divisions of the western United States include three mountain systems: the Rocky Mountain System (areas 16–19), the Cascade–Sierra Nevada (23), and the Pacific Border Province (24).

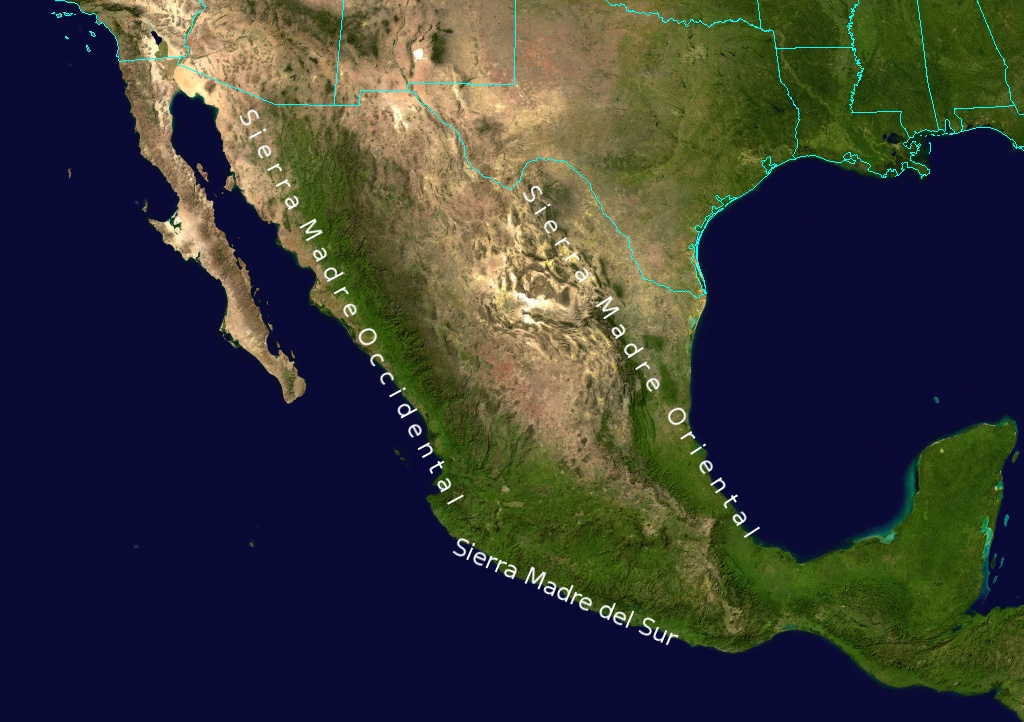
Physiographic divisions of Mexico include three mountain systems: the Sierra Madre Oriental, the Sierra Madre Occidental and the Sierra Madre del Sur (which is an extension of the Peninsular Ranges).

The North American Cordillera extends from the U.S. state of Alaska to the southern border of Mexico, and includes some of the highest peaks on the continent. Its mountain ranges generally run north-to-south along three main belts: the Pacific Coast Ranges in the west, the Nevadan belt in the middle (including the Sierra Nevada), and the Laramide belt in the east (including the Rocky Mountains and the Black Hills).

These three orogenic belts (also called "orogens") arose due to the engagement of tectonic plates which deformed the Earth's lithosphere (crust and uppermost mantle). For example, the Laramide orogeny changed the topography of the central Rocky Mountains and adjoining Laramide regions (from central Montana to central New Mexico) during the Late Cretaceous 80 million years ago. Prior to this time the Rocky Mountain region was occupied by a broad basin. Further topographical evolution occurred during the Eocene (55–50 million years ago) and Oligocene (34–23 million years ago), but since that time, the region has been relatively stable. Generally speaking, it will be convenient here to consider these three belts going west to east, and north to south.

In Alaska, south of the Interior Plains area, is the Rocky Mountain System, then the Intermontane Basins and Ranges, and in the southern part of the state are the Pacific Mountains and Valleys. In the Alaska panhandle, the mainland mountain ranges and offshore islands (the Alexander Archipelago) are extensions of respective ranges further south.

In Canada, the North American Cordillera is usually divided into three physiographic regions: the western system, the interior system, and the eastern system. The western system includes the Coast Mountains, the interior system includes the Columbia Mountains, and the eastern system includes the Canadian Rockies.

At its midsection between San Francisco, California, and Denver, Colorado, the North American Cordillera is about 1,000 miles (1,600 km) wide, and its physiographic provinces at this midpoint are as follows, going from west to east: the Pacific Coast Ranges, the Central Valley, the Sierra Nevada, the Basin and Range Province (forming many narrow ranges and valleys), the Colorado Plateau, and the Rocky Mountains. In the United States, another major feature of the Cordillera is the Columbia Plateau, located north of California between the Cascade Range, the Sierra Nevada, and the Rocky Mountains.

In Mexico, the Sierra Madre Occidental, and the Sierra Madre Oriental further east, surround the Mexican Plateau. To the west of the Sierra Madre Occidental, the Peninsular Ranges border the Pacific Ocean, and the Sierra Madre del Sur is the southern extension of the Peninsular Ranges. Sierra Madre means "Mother Range" in Spanish.

The Nevadan belt runs up and down the middle of the North American Cordillera. Therefore, the intermontane areas of the cordillera can be divided up into the areas east of the Nevadan belt, and those west of the Nevadan belt.

== Pacific Coast Belt ==
The Pacific Coast Ranges, comprising the Pacific Coast Belt, parallel the North American Pacific Coast, and comprise several mountain systems. Along the British Columbia and Alaska coasts, the mountains intermix with the sea in a complex maze of fjords, with thousands of islands. Off the Southern California coast, the Channel Islands archipelago of the Santa Monica Mountains extends for 160 miles (260 km).

=== Southern Alaska ranges ===
In southern Alaska, the primary mountain ranges are the Alaska Range, Wrangell Mountains, Saint Elias Mountains, Kenai Mountains, Chugach Mountains, and Talkeetna Mountains.

=== Western System of Canada ===
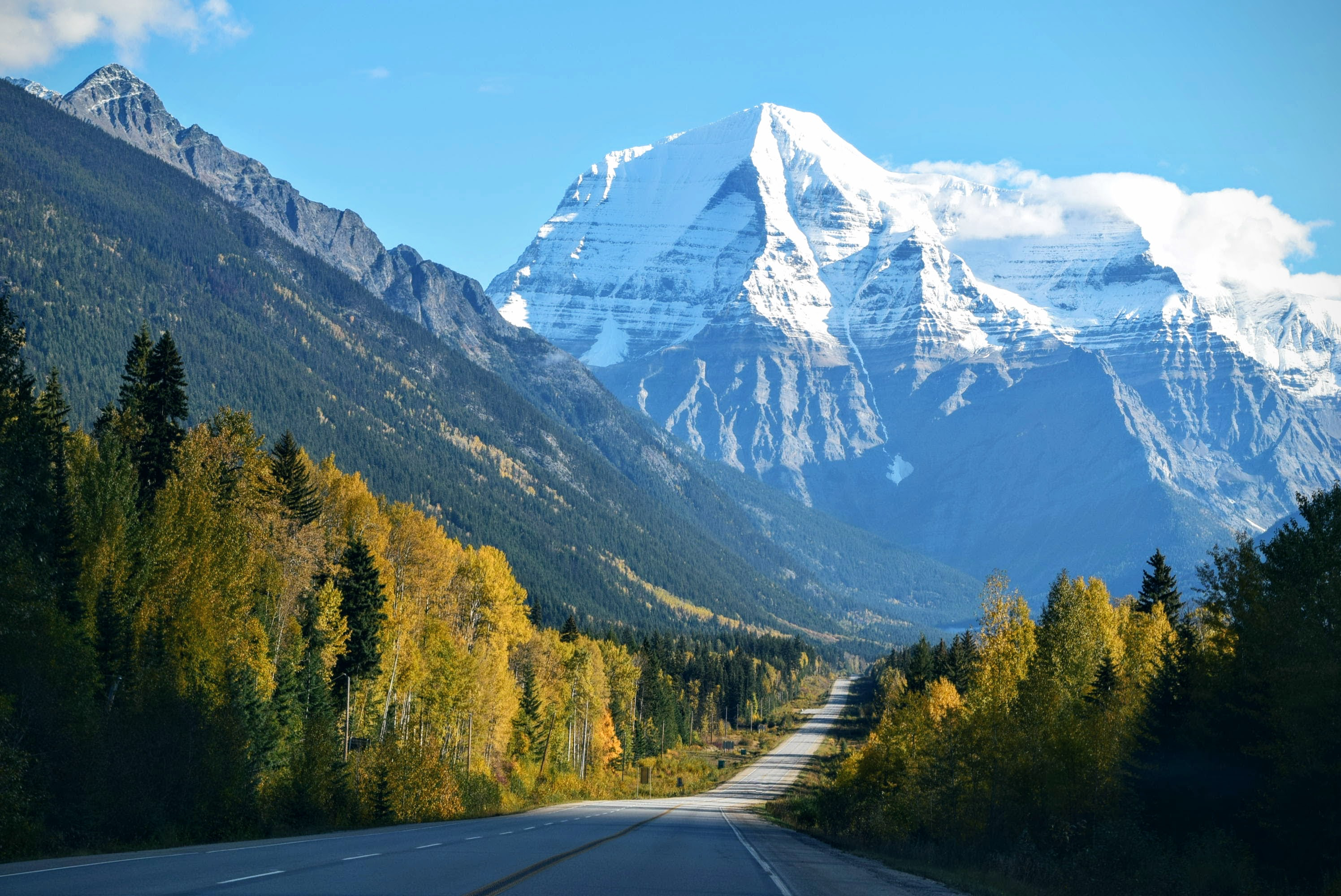
Mount Robson in British Columbia

The Yukon Ranges comprise the mountains in the southeastern part of the U.S. state of Alaska and most of the Yukon, Canada. This range has an area of 364,710 km^{2} (140,820 sq mi).

The Coast Mountains run from the lower Fraser River and the Fraser Canyon northwestward, separating the Interior Plateau from the Pacific Ocean. Their coastal flank is characterized by an intense network of fjords and associated islands, very similar to the Norwegian coastline, while their inland side against the plateau transitions to the high plateau in dryland valleys notable for a series of large lakes similar to the alpine lakes of southern Switzerland, beginning in deep mountains and ending in flatland. They are subdivided in three main groupings, the Pacific Ranges between the Fraser and Bella Coola, the Kitimat Ranges from there northwards to the Nass River, and the Boundary Ranges from there to their terminus in the Yukon Territory at Champagne Pass and Chilkat Pass northwest of Haines, Alaska. The Saint Elias Mountains lie to their west and northwest, while the Yukon Ranges and Yukon Basin lie to their north. On the inland side of the Boundary Ranges are the Tahltan and Tagish Highlands and also the Skeena Mountains, part of the Interior Mountains system, which also extend southwards on the inland side of the Kitimat Ranges.

The terrain of the main spine of the Coast Mountains is typified by heavy glaciation, including several very large icefields of varying elevation. Of the three subdivisions, the Pacific Ranges are the highest and are crowned by Mount Waddington, while the Boundary Ranges contain the largest icefields, the Juneau Icefield being the largest. The Kitimat Ranges are lower and less glacier-covered than either of the other two groupings, but are extremely rugged and dense.

The Coast Mountains are made of igneous and metamorphic rock from an episode of arc volcanism related to subduction of the Kula and Farallon Plates during the Laramide orogeny about 100 million years ago. The widespread granite forming the Coast Mountains formed when magma intruded and cooled at depth beneath volcanoes of the Coast Range Arc, whereas the metamorphic formed when intruding magma heated the surrounding rock to produce schist.

The Insular Mountains extend from Vancouver Island in the south to Haida Gwaii in the north on the British Columbia Coast. It contains two main mountain ranges, the Vancouver Island Ranges on Vancouver Island and the Queen Charlotte Mountains on Haida Gwaii.

=== Pacific Border Province in contiguous U.S. ===
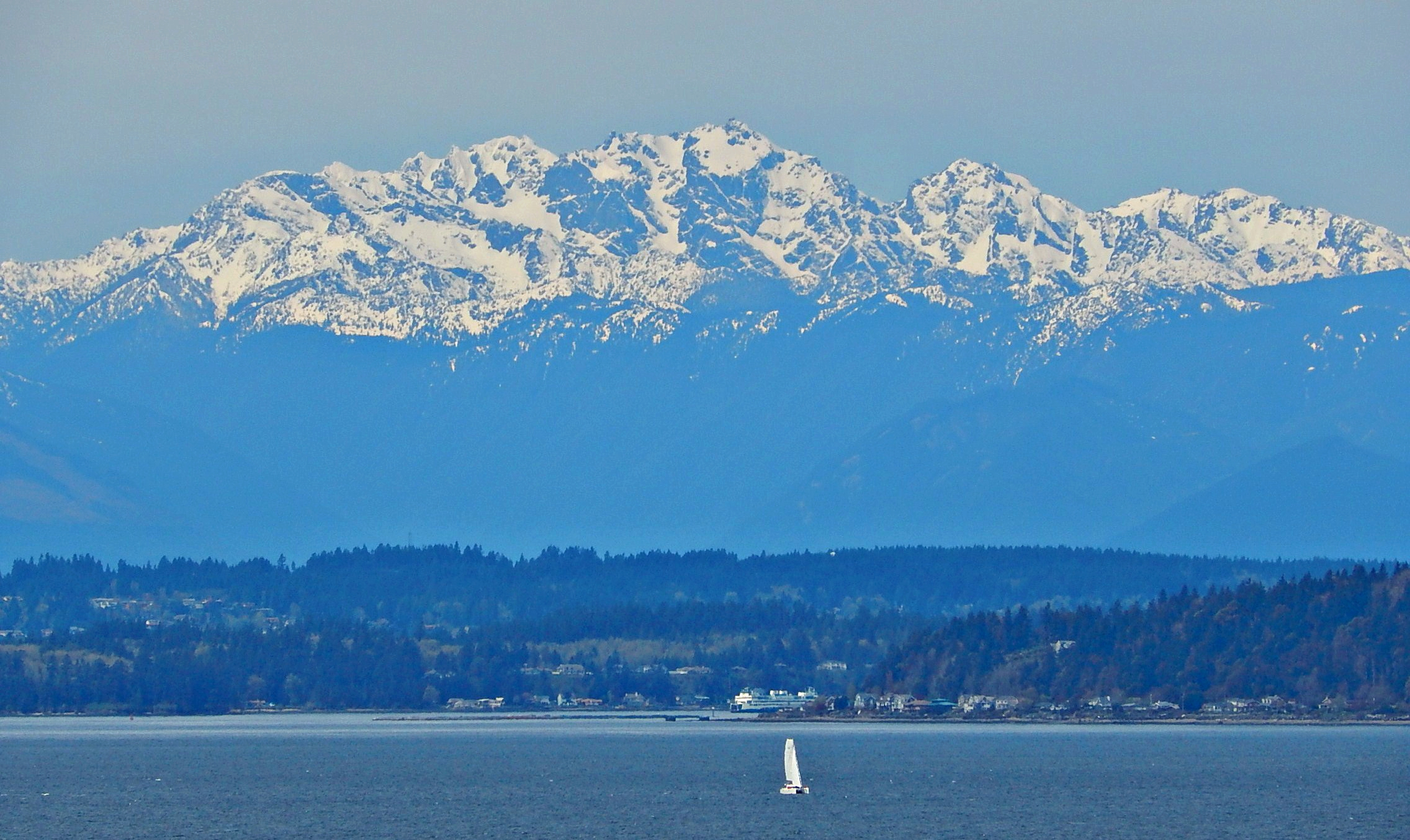
Olympic Mountains in Washington

The Olympic Mountains is a mountain range on the Olympic Peninsula of western Washington in the United States. The mountains, part of the Pacific Coast Ranges, are not especially high – Mount Olympus is the highest at 7,962 ft (2,427 m) – but the western slopes of the Olympics rise directly out of the Pacific Ocean and are the wettest place in the contiguous 48 states. Most of the mountains are protected within the bounds of the Olympic National Park.

South of the Olympics lies the Chehalis River valley representing a break in elevation and drainages, followed by the Willapa Hills. The highest peak in the Willapa Hills is Boistfort Peak with an elevation of 3,113 feet (949 m). This region represents the lowest of the upland areas in the Pacific Coast Ranges.

The Oregon Coast Range is the part of the Coast Range system that is denoted as between the mouth of the Columbia River and the Middle Fork Coquille River. It is about 200 miles (320 km) long. The highest peak is Marys Peak, at 4,101 ft (1,250 m).

The California Coast Ranges are one of the eleven traditional geomorphic provinces of California. This province includes several – but not all – mountain ranges along the California coast (the Transverse Ranges, Peninsular Ranges, and Klamath Mountains are not included).

=== Western mountain ranges of Mexico ===
The Sierra Madre del Sur mountains in southwestern Mexico form a southern extension of the Peninsular Ranges of Baja California. The Peninsular Ranges are separated from the Sierra Madre del Sur by an expanse of ocean.

== Nevadan belt ==
The Nevadan belt is located between the Pacific coast belt and the Laramide belt. Nevada means "snow-covered" in Spanish.

=== Interior System of Canada ===
In Canada, the Northern Interior Mountains are a northern extension of the Columbia Mountains. They include the Hazelton Mountains, Cassiar Mountains, Omineca Mountains, and Skeena Mountains.

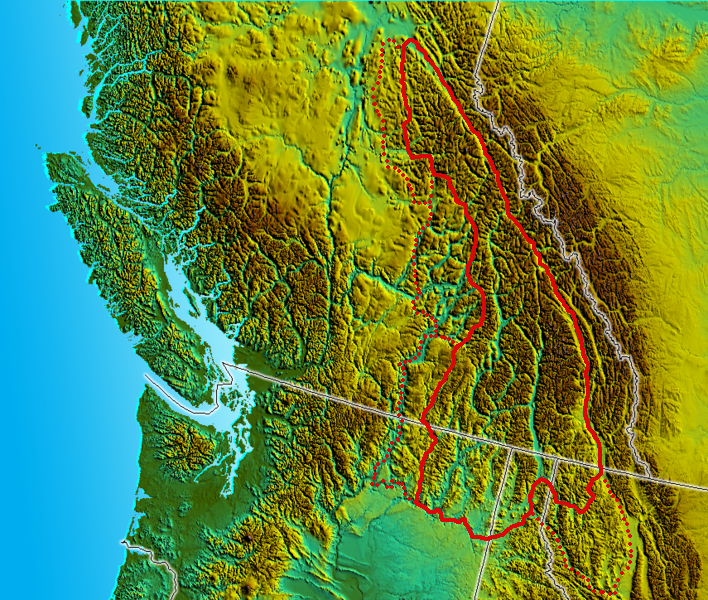
Location map of Columbia Mountains

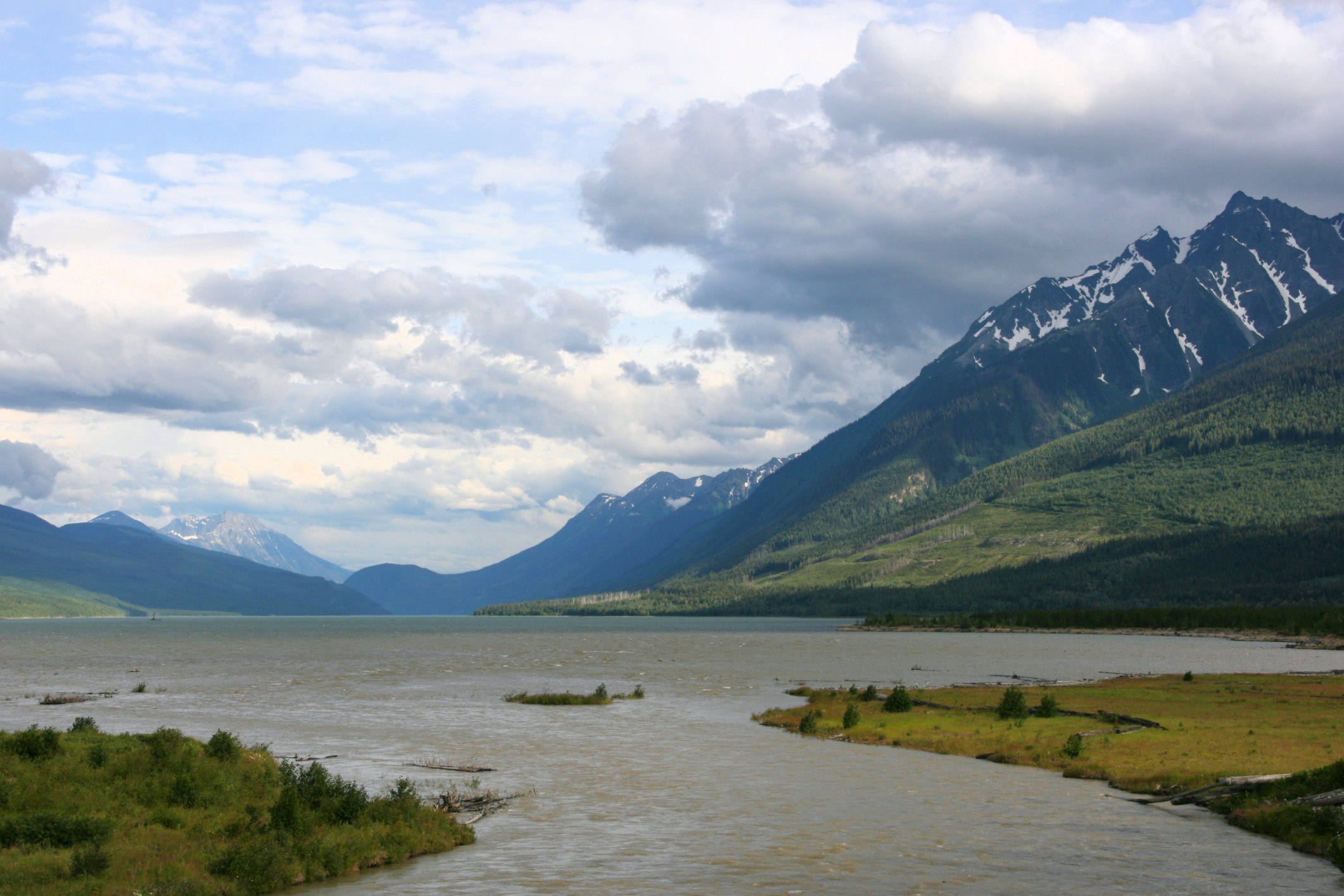
Monashee Mountains

The Columbia Mountains are a designation in British Columbia for a group of four ranges lying between the Rocky Mountain Trench (to the east) and the Interior Plateau (to the west). These ranges are the Cariboo Mountains, which are the northernmost and sometimes considered to be part of the Interior Plateau, the Selkirk Mountains, the Purcell Mountains, and the Monashee Mountains.

The Columbia Mountains are classified as being in Canada's interior system, rather than its eastern system. However, the Columbia Mountains are an extension of mountains in the United States that are considered part of the Rocky Mountains, and therefore the Columbia Mountains are often treated as being part of the Rockies.

The Selkirks and Purcells lie entirely within the basin of the Columbia River, while the Monashees lie to the river's west on its southward course from its Big Bend and are flanked on the west by the basin of the Thompson and Okanagan Rivers. There are many named subranges of all four subgroupings, particularly in the Selkirks and Monashees. The southward extension of the Selkirks, Purcells and Monashees into the United States are reckoned to be part of the Rocky Mountains and the designation Columbia Mountains is not used there (the Purcells, also, go by the name "Percell Mountains" in the United States). The Salish and Cabinet Mountains south of the Kootenai River are essentially part of the same landform, but are officially designated part of the Rocky Mountains in the United States.

To the west of the Monashees and Cariboos, there are three intermediary upland areas which are transitional between the mountain ranges and the plateaus flanking the Fraser and Thompson Rivers. These Quesnel, Shuswap, and Okanagan Highlands are sometimes considered as being part of the neighbouring ranges rather than the plateaus and are often spoken of that way locally but are formally designated as being part of the Interior Plateau. The southernmost extends into Washington, where it is named by the American spelling Okanogan Highland (and was the first-named of these groupings).

=== Cascade–Sierra Mountains in contiguous U.S. ===
The Cascade Range (called the Cascade Mountains in Canada) extends from northern California in the United States to British Columbia, Canada. It consists of non-volcanic and volcanic mountains: all of the known historic eruptions in the contiguous United States have been from the volcanoes of the Cascade Volcanic Arc. The highest peak in the Cascade Range is Mount Rainier (14,409 feet (4,392 m)), a stratovolcano. The small portion of the Cascade Range in Canada is called the Cascade Mountains or Canadian Cascades, and in its southwestern area is similar in terrain to the area north of Glacier Peak, known as the North Cascades, and its northern and eastern extremities verge on the Thompson Plateau in a less rugged fashion than in most other parts of the range. The North Cascades are very different in character from the series of high volcanic stratovolcanoes from Rainier southwards to Mount Shasta and Lassen Peak, and are more severely alpine and steeply rugged, particularly the Skagit Range. Inland portions of the range are dryland and plateau-like in character, such as the Okanagan Range, which lies along the Cascades' northeastern margin, separated by the Similkameen River.

The Sierra Nevada forms an inland mountain spine of northern California, extending from the terminus of the Cascade Range south of Lassen Peak southwards along the east flank of the Central Valley of California to the Transverse Ranges, forming a mountain region of complex terrain and varied geology which separates the Central Valley from the Great Basin to the east. The mean height of the mountain summits in the Sierra Nevada gradually increases from north to south, culminating at Mount Whitney (14,505 feet (4,421 m)), the highest point in the contiguous United States. From east to west, the Sierra is wedge-shaped: the west slope gradually rises and the east slope forms a steep escarpment, particularly so in the southern portion.

The northern Sierra surface rocks are predominantly volcanic, while the southern Sierra granitic batholith has been sculpted by glaciers into dramatic U-shaped valleys and thin ridges called arêtes.

=== Sierra Madre Occidental in Mexico ===
The Sierra Madre Occidental mountain range is a southern extension of the Sierra Nevada. The range extends from near the Arizona border down to the Sierra Madre del Sur, along the western mainland of Mexico. The high plateau that is formed by the range is cut by deep river valleys.

== Laramide Belt ==
The Laramide belt is on the side of the North American Cordillera most distant from the Pacific Coast Ranges. It is named for the Laramie Mountains of eastern Wyoming (in turn named for Jacques La Ramee, a trapper who disappeared in the Laramie Mountains in 1820 and was never heard from again).

=== Alaska and Eastern System of Canada ===
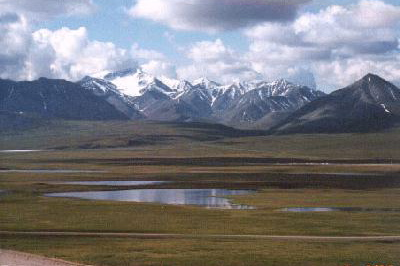
The Brooks Range in Alaska

The Brooks Range includes the northernmost of the major mountain systems of the North American Cordillera, and extends along an east–west axis across northern Alaska from near the northern opening of the Bering Strait to the northern Yukon Territory. Major subranges include the British Mountains and Richardson Mountains, towards their eastern end, and at their farthest west is the De Long Mountains. The Brooks Range forms the northern flank of the lower Yukon River basin, separating it from Alaska's North Slope region, facing the Beaufort Sea. The Brooks Range is considered part of (or an extension of) the Rockies. South of the Brooks Range are the Mackenzie Mountains and the Canadian Rockies.

=== Rocky Mountain System in Canada and contiguous U.S. ===
In the Rocky Mountains, the highest peak is Mount Elbert in Colorado at 14,439 feet (4,401 m) above sea level. The North American Rockies rise steeply over the Interior Plains to the east, and over the Great Basin to the west, and extend south to the Rio Grande in New Mexico. The United States definition of the Rockies includes the Cabinet and Salish Mountains of Idaho and Montana, whereas their counterparts in Canada north of the Kootenai River, the Columbia Mountains, are sometimes considered a separate system lying to the west of the huge Rocky Mountain Trench which runs the length of British Columbia.

=== Sierra Madre Oriental in Mexico ===
The Sierra Madre Oriental mountains in eastern Mexico are a southern extension of the Rocky Mountains. The Sierra Madre Oriental spans about 1,000 km (600 miles). Mexico's Gulf Coastal Plain lies to the east of the range, between the mountains and the Gulf of Mexico coast. The Mexican Plateau lies to the west of the range.

== Intermontane areas seaward from the Nevadan belt ==
The Nevadan belt runs down the middle of the North American Cordillera. Therefore, the intermontane areas can be divided up into the areas east of the Nevadan belt, and those west of the Nevadan belt.

=== Canadian portion ===
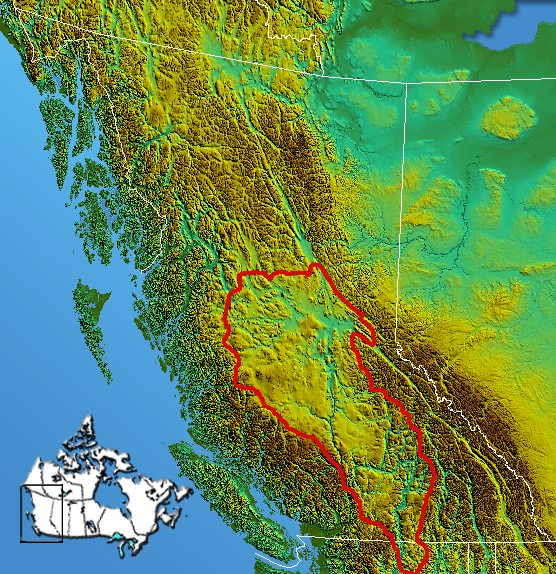
Interior Plateau

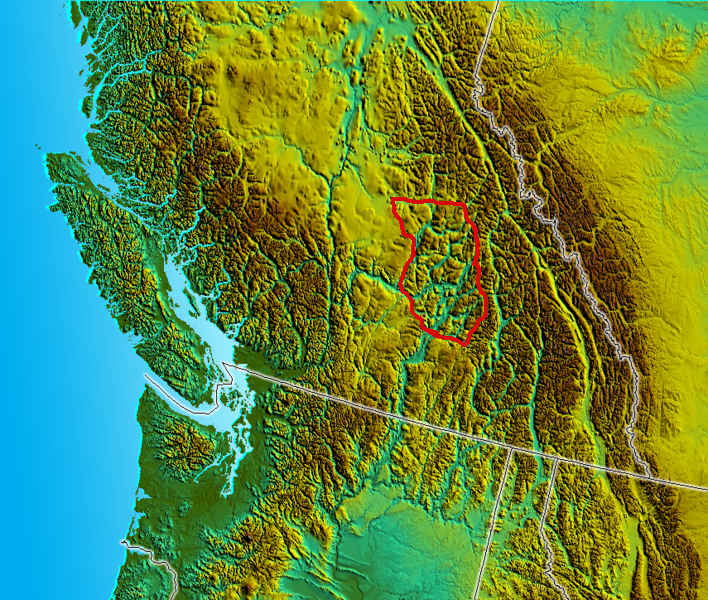
Shuswap Highland

The Interior Plateau is the northern continuation of the Columbia Plateau, and covers much of inland British Columbia. The Cariboo Mountains and Monashee Mountains lie to the east, the Canadian Cascades are to the southwest, and the Hazelton Mountains and Coast Range to the west and northwest.

Within the Interior plateau, the Shuswap Highland consists of a portion of the foothills between the Thompson Plateau and Bonaparte Plateau on the west, and the Monashee Mountains and Cariboo Mountains on the east and northeast.

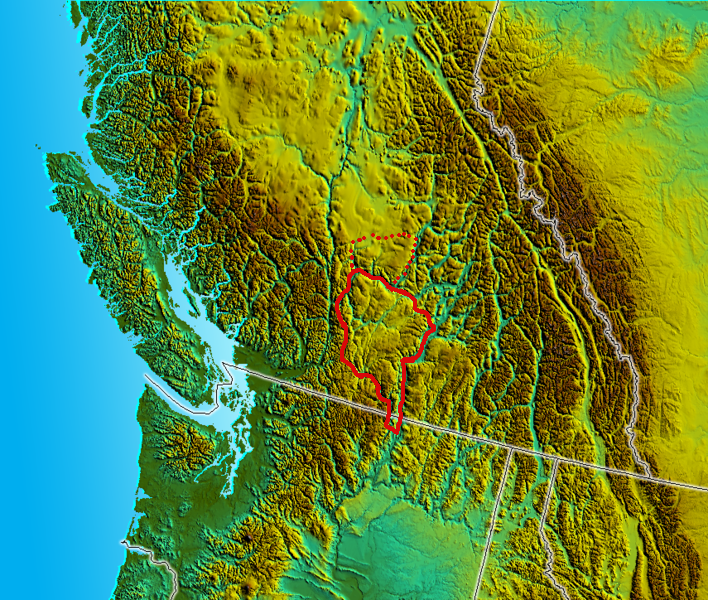
Thompson Plateau

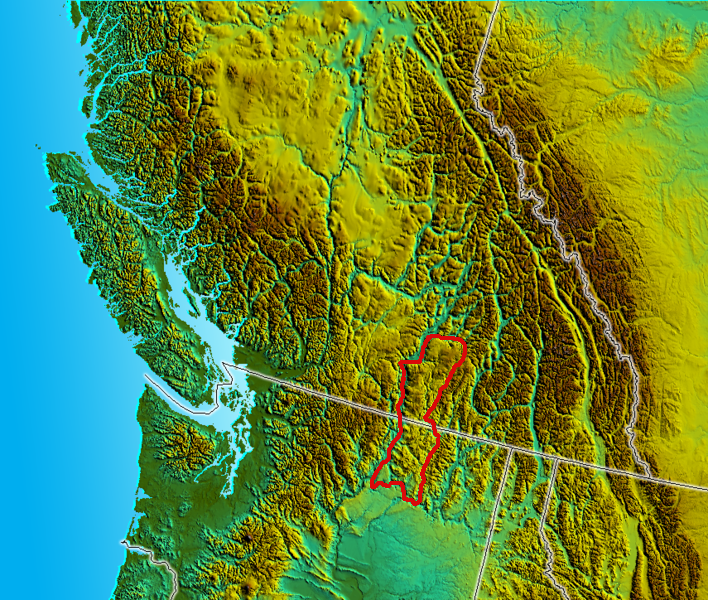
Okanagan Highland

Also within the Interior plateau, the Thompson Plateau forms the southern portion of the Interior Plateau. It is bordered on the south by the Canadian Cascades and on the north by the Thompson River.

The Okanagan Highland is the part of the Interior Plateau to the east of the Thompson Plateau, and is bounded by the Okanagan River on the west, the Shuswap River on the north, and the Kettle River on the east side. The Okanagan Highland is described as being a hilly plateau, and is located in southern British Columbia and northern Washington. The Interior Plateau also includes the Quesnel Highland, Fraser Plateau, Nechako Plateau, and McGregor Plateau.

=== Portion in contiguous U.S. ===
California's Central Valley is a large, flat valley that dominates the central portion of California, stretching inland and parallel to the Pacific Ocean coast. Its northern half is referred to as the Sacramento Valley, and its southern half as the San Joaquin Valley. The two-halves meet at the huge Sacramento-San Joaquin River Delta of the Sacramento and San Joaquin Rivers, which along with their tributaries drain the majority of the valley and flow into San Francisco Bay. The Central Valley covers an area of approximately 22,500 square miles (58,000 km^{2}), making it slightly smaller than the state of West Virginia and about 13.7% of California's total area. The Central Valley is 40 to 60 miles (60 to 100 km) wide, with the Sierra Nevada to the east and the Coast Ranges to the west.

In northwestern Oregon, the fertile Willamette Valley lies between the Oregon Coast Range and the Cascades; this depression continues north into Washington as the Puget Trough.

=== Mexican portion ===
The Gulf of California is a body of water that separates the Peninsular Ranges from the Sierra Madre Occidental on the Mexican mainland. The Gulf of California is 1,126 km (700 miles) long and 48 to 241 km (30 to 150 miles) wide, with an area of 177,000 km^{2} (68,000 sq mi), a mean depth of 818.08 m (2,684.0 ft), and a volume of 145,000 km^{3} (35,000 cu mi).

== Intermontane areas inland from the Nevadan belt ==
=== Canadian portion ===
The Rocky Mountain Trench is a large valley that extends approximately 1,600 km (990 mi) from Flathead Lake, Montana, to the Liard River, just south of the British Columbia–Yukon border near Watson Lake, Yukon. The trench bottom is 3 to 16 km (2 to 10 miles) wide and ranges from 600 to 900 m (2,000 to 3,000 ft) above sea level. The general orientation of the Trench is almost uniformly pointing north. Some of its topography has been carved into glacial valleys, but it is primarily a byproduct of faulting. The Trench separates the Rocky Mountains on its east from the Columbia Mountains and the Cassiar Mountains on its west. It is up to 25 km (16 miles) wide, if measured peak-to-peak.

For convenience the Rocky Mountain Trench may be divided into northern and southern sections. The dividing point reflects the separation of north and easterly flows to the Arctic Ocean versus south and westerly flows to the Pacific Ocean. A break in the valley system at around 54°N near Prince George, British Columbia, may be used for this purpose. There are three main mountain ranges in the Canadian area named the Rocky Mountains, the Columbia Mountains, and the Coast Mountains.

=== Portion in contiguous U.S. ===
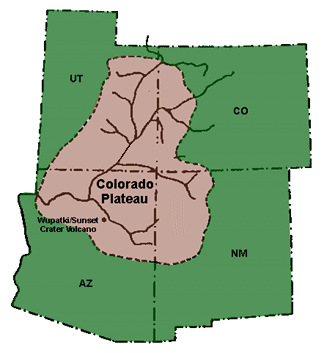
Colorado Plateau

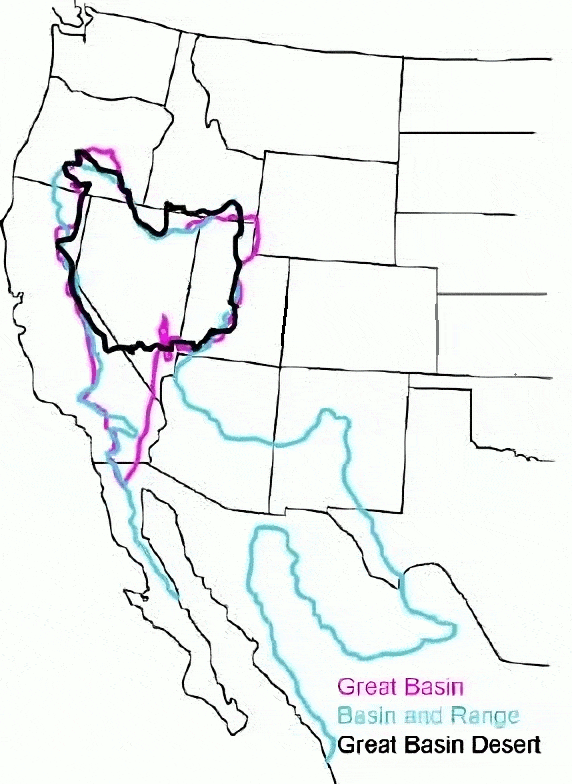
Basin & Range Province (indicated in blue)

The Columbia Plateau is a geologic and geographic region that lies across parts of the U.S. states of Washington, Oregon, and Idaho. It is a wide flood basalt plateau between the Cascade Range and the Rocky Mountains, cut through by the Columbia River. In one of various usages, the term "Columbia Basin" refers to more or less the same area as the Columbia Plateau.

The Basin and Range province covers most of the state of Nevada and parts of the states of Arizona, California, Idaho, New Mexico, Oregon, Texas, Utah, and Wyoming, as well as much of northern Mexico. It is an extremely arid region characterized by basin and range topography.

The Colorado Plateau is an area of high desert located in Arizona, New Mexico, Colorado, and Utah, bisected by the Colorado River which flows westward through the southern part, and the Green River which flows south from the northernmost part of the plateau. The Green is a tributary of the Colorado, the confluence being west of Moab, Utah in Canyonlands National Park.

=== Mexican portion ===
The Mexican Plateau is one of six distinct physiographic sections of the Basin and Range Province, which in turn is part of the Intermontane Plateaus physiographic division. It is a large arid-to-semiarid plateau that occupies much of northern and central Mexico. Averaging 1,825 m (5,988 ft) above sea level, it extends from the United States border in the north to the Trans-Mexican Volcanic Belt in the south and is bounded by the Sierra Madre Occidental and Sierra Madre Oriental to the west and east, respectively.

A low east–west mountain range in the state of Zacatecas divides the plateau into northern and southern sections. These two sections, called the Northern Plateau (Spanish: Mesa del Norte) and Central Plateau (Spanish: Mesa Central), are now generally regarded by geographers as sections of one plateau.

== See also ==
- List of ecoregions in North America (CEC): Western Cordillera
