= Botanie Mountain =

Mountain in British Columbia, Canada

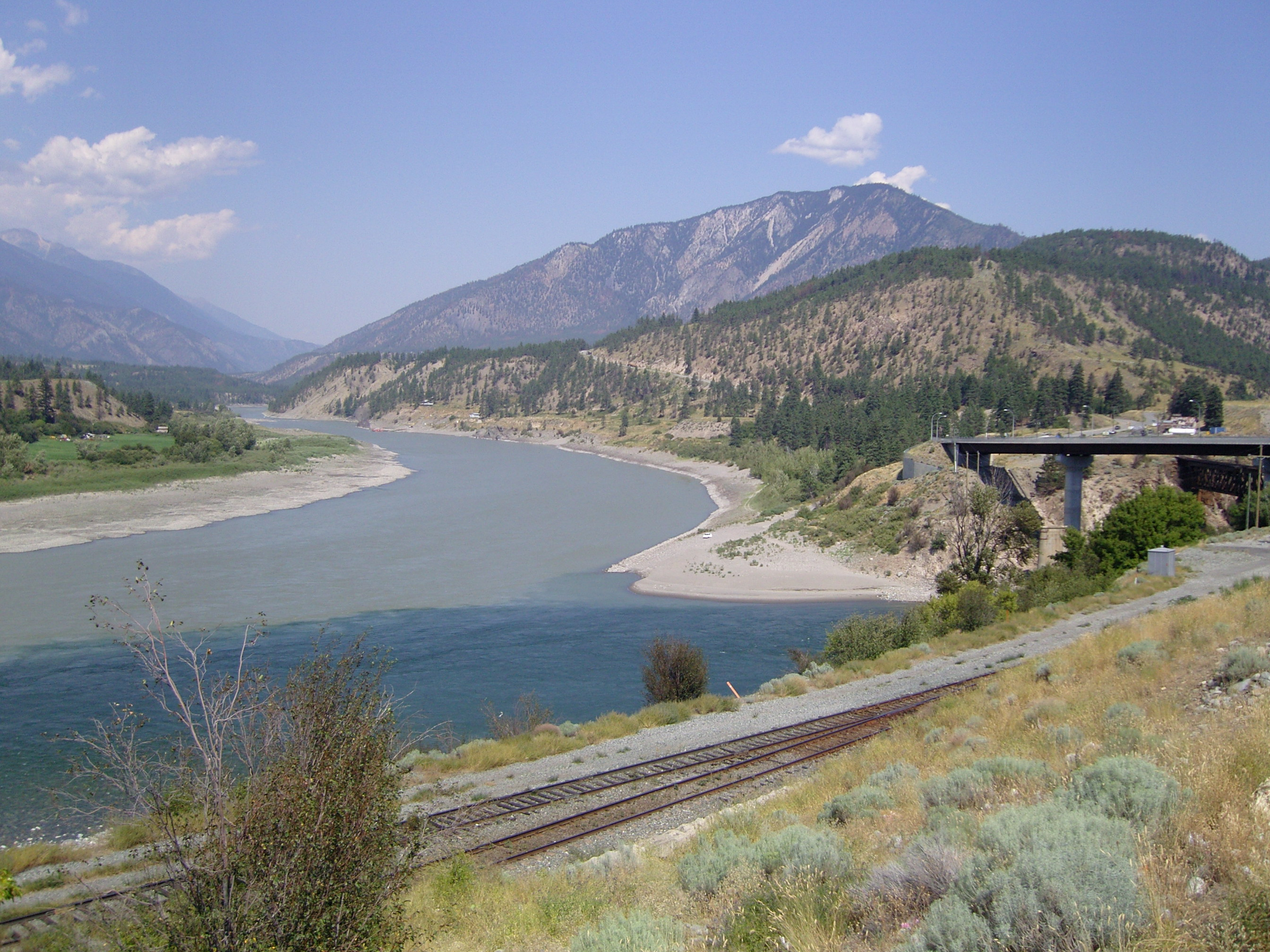
- The confluence of the Fraser & Thompson Rivers showing the mixing of the two different coloured waters. Botanie Mountain right background, Lillooet Ranges at left.

Highest point
- Elevation: 2,077 m (6,814 ft)
- Prominence: 855 m (2,805 ft)
- Listing: Mountains of British Columbia
- Coordinates: 50°22′15″N 121°36′02″W

Geography
- Location within British Columbia
- Interactive map of Botanie Mountain
- Location: British Columbia, Canada
- District: Kamloops Division Yale Land District
- Parent range: Clear Range (Fraser Plateau)
- Topo map: NTS 92I5 Stein River

Botanie Mountain, also spelled Bootahnie Mountain, is a mountain in the Clear Range of the Southern Interior of British Columbia, Canada. It is located immediately north of the village of Lytton, which is situated at the confluence of the Thompson and Fraser Rivers.

== Access and fire lookout ==
A fire lookout stands atop a peak approximately 3.5 kilometers (2.2 mi) to the south (elevation 1,992 m (6,535 ft)) which is owned and maintained by the local wireless society for TV, radio, and digital transmission. The current view from the lookout can be seen via a live webcam. The lookout is accessible by two very rough 4x4 roads which approach from either end of the mountain, which is somewhat ridge-like, on a north–south axis. The roads have been decommissioned and are no longer driveable above a certain elevation. The summit is one of the highest on the east flank of the Fraser Canyon and enjoys views over the Scarped Range and Thompson Plateau to the east and southeast, across the Thompson River's lower canyon, the Clear Range to the north and northwest, the Cascade Mountains to the south, and west across the Fraser to the Lillooet Ranges.

== Name ==
The older spelling "Boothanie" is suggestive of the proper pronunciation of the mountain's name, i.e. it is unlike the English word "botany" and has been "phonetically" spelled as Boo-TAW-ny. In the language of the Thompson or Nlaka'pamux people, it means "covered", "covering" or "blanketed all over", which is thought to be a reference to its shroud of cloud or fog in times of bad weather, or else a reference to the abundant plant cover in the area. The Botanie Valley, which is formed by Botanie Creek on its east flank and runs south from Botanie Lake, is an important food-plant gathering area for the Nlaka'pamux.

A publication of the Geological Survey of Canada, Summary Report from 1894, asserts the name-origin (p. 402B) to the Shuswap language of the Secwepemc people, meaning "perpetual root place". Secwepemc territory today begins in the basin of Hat Creek, which lies on the "inside" of the Clear Range to the northwest of Botanie Mountain. The mountain is, however, decidedly in Nlaka'pamux territory.
