= Stockton Hill =

- Location within British Columbia
- Interactive map of Stockton Hill

Highest point
- Elevation: 1,574 m (5,164 ft)
- Prominence: 156 m (512 ft)
- Listing: List of volcanoes in Canada
- Coordinates: 51°10′36.1″N 120°33′20.2″W

Geography
- Location: British Columbia, Canada
- District: Kamloops Division Yale Land District
- Parent range: Bonaparte Plateau, Thompson Plateau
- Topo map: NTS 92P2 Criss Creek

Geology
- Mountain type: Volcanic plug
- Volcanic zone: Chilcotin Group

Stockton Hill is a volcanic plug located in the formation known as the Chilcotin Group, which lie between the Pacific Ranges of the Coast Mountains and the mid-Fraser River in British Columbia, Canada.

== Location and terrain ==
Stockton Hill is located a butte-like rocky hill atop the Bonaparte Plateau at the head of the Deadman River and 7 km (4 mi) south of Bonaparte Lake and 30 km (19 mi) west of Barriere and northeast of Silwhoaikun. There are other summits higher than 1,500 m (4,921 ft) in the hills in the immediate area, but Stockton Hill is the highest, and the most distinct and steep-sided. Bare Lake is immediately north, Elbow Lake to the southwest, and an unnamed lake to the south-southeast.

== See also ==
- List of volcanoes in Canada
- Volcanism in Canada
- Skoatl Point
