= Clear Range =

Mountain range in Canada

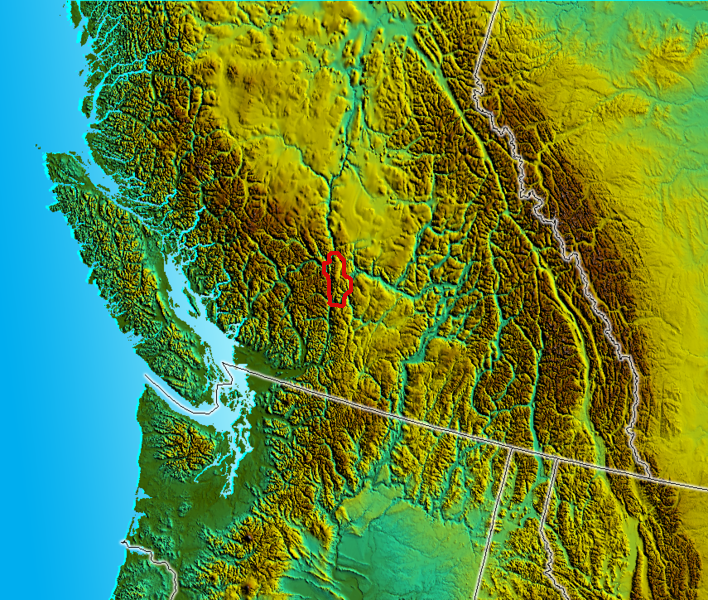
- Location map of the Clear Range

Highest point
- Peak: Blustry Mountain
- Elevation: 2,334 m (7,657 ft)
- Coordinates: 50°36′41.0″N 121°41′56.0″W

Dimensions
- Area: 2,123 km^{2} (820 mi^{2})

Geography
- Country: Canada
- Province: British Columbia
- Parent range: Fraser Plateau

The Clear Range is a small mountain range located in the angle of the Fraser and Thompson Rivers in south-central British Columbia, Canada. It has a small subdivision just northeast of that confluence named the Scarped Range. The Clear Range totals 16,270 km^{2} (6,280 sq mi) and is 75 km (47 mi) north to south and 35 km (22 mi) east to west (at its widest point). The Clear Range and its northward neighbour the Marble Range are both subranges of the Pavilion Range.

It and the neighbouring Marble Range line the east bank of the Fraser River north of the town of Lytton, British Columbia. The Clear Range extends as far as the town of Pavilion and is bounded by the south wall of Marble Canyon on the north. The southeast flank of the Clear Range is the Thompson River between Ashcroft and Lytton, while to its northeast are the Cornwall and Trachyte Hills, and beyond them the Arrowstone Hills of the Bonaparte Plateau. The range is horseshoe-shaped, facing the high rangeland-plateau basin of Hat Creek, which drains northeast to join the Bonaparte River, a tributary of the Thompson. All of these areas, including the Clear Range, are classified by geographers as belonging to the Fraser Plateau, which is part of the Interior Plateau.

== Terrain ==
The outer flanks of the range are steep, particularly on the side of the Fraser, where the northerly peaks are a high plateau-edge almost 2,000 m (6,600 ft) above the river below. The core of the range is rugged and has a complex series of interlocking valleys. Karst formations throughout the area suggest caves, though none has been discovered, and there are scores of intermittent waterfalls and sub-alpine swamps. The northern edge of the Clear Range is the south wall of Marble Canyon.

The highest summits are Blustry Mountain, 2,334 m (7,657 ft); its neighbor Cairn Peak 2,328 m (7,638 ft); and north of them, Moore Peak, 2,223 m (7,293 ft); and Chipuin Mountain, 2,170 m (7,120 ft). The highest peak in the southern part of the range is Botanie Mountain (bu-TAN-ee), just north of Lytton 2,077 m (6,814 ft), but higher in the centre of the range is Mount Murray 2,153 m (7,064 ft). A separate ridge across the Fraser River from Lillooet is named Fountain Ridge. It is geologically distinct, actually a sliver of plate between the Fraser and Yalakom Faults. Arthur Seat, 1,672 m (5,486 ft), lies in that range on the west side of Spences Bridge, and was named by pioneer John Murray for the similarly named mountain in Edinburgh, Scotland.

== Flora and fauna ==
The climate is varied, though mostly dry, especially on the west and southeast. The interior of the range gets more waterfall and is heavily treed relative to the canyons flanking it

Typical boreal forest and mountain wildlife prevail: grizzly bear, black bear, black-tail deer, moose, and various rodents. The range's reptile populations include several varieties of dryland lizard and also the timber rattlesnake; the Clear Range is the farthest northwest extent of the rattlesnake.

== History and culture ==
The Clear Range is largely the domain of the Nlaka'pamux peoples, although the northwest edge of the range is occupied by communities of the St'at'imc people and a rancherie of the Bonaparte River band of the Secwepemc people at Marble Canyon, whose territory also includes southeastern portion of the range along the Thompson. There are no urban settlements or towns in the range although it is skirted by three major highways and also three rail lines (the BCR, CPR and CNR).

Due to its location, it overlooked the great movement of prospectors during the Fraser Canyon and Cariboo Gold Rushes although no major mines or deposits were found on its slopes. At its northern extremity there is a large deposit of low-grade lignite, adjacent to Marble Canyon on the northwestern edge of the Hat Creek basin that has long been proposed for a major open-pit coal mine and coal-powered generating plant.

The area is heavily logged but thereby interlaced with logging roads and other trails popular with 4x4 recreationists, mountain bikers and others.
