= Spences Bridge =

Community in British Columbia, Canada

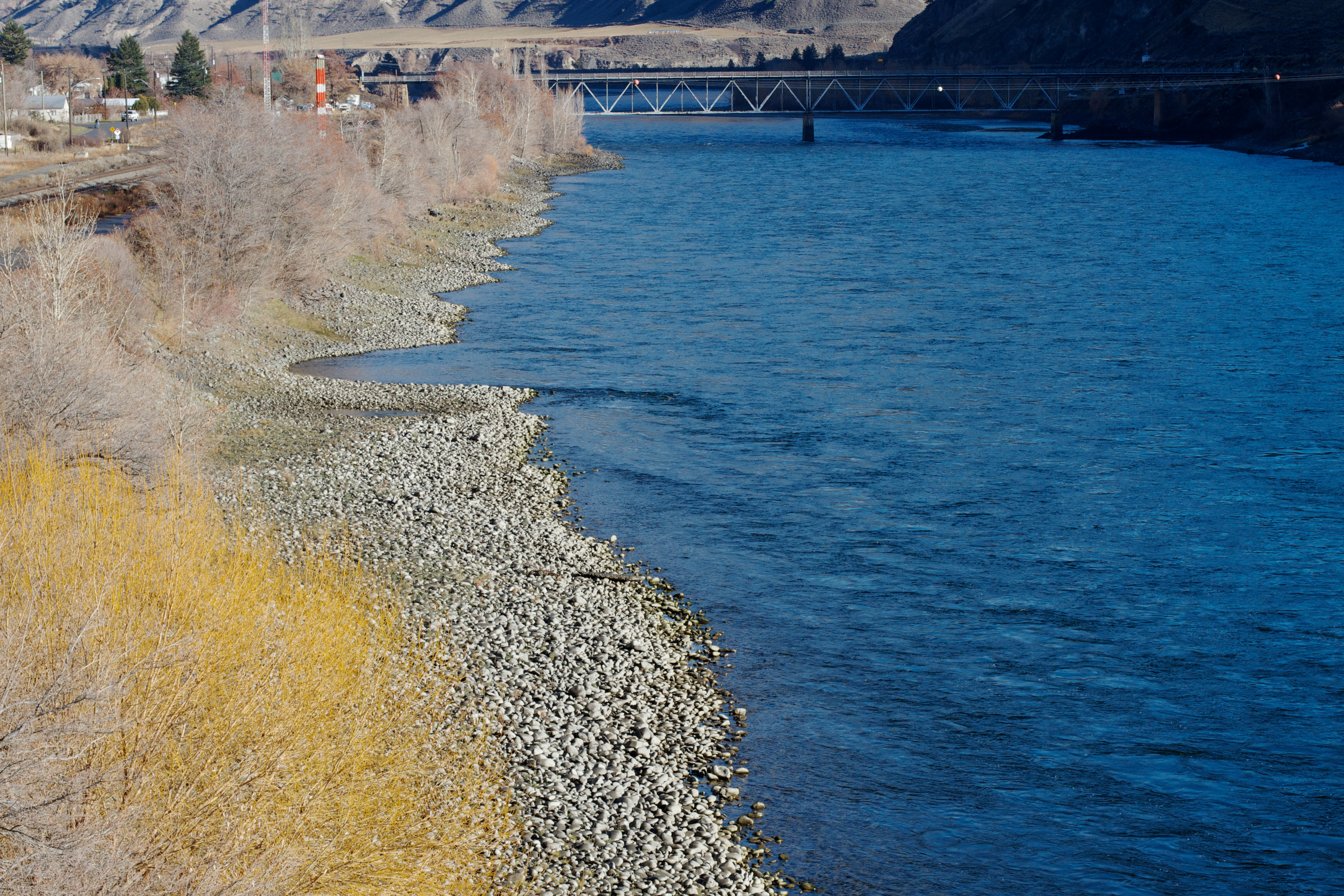
- The Old Spences Bridge

- Location of Spences Bridge Spences Bridge (Canada)
- Coordinates: 50°25′N 121°21′W
- Country: Canada
- Province: British Columbia
- Regional district: Thompson-Nicola

Area (2021)
  - Land: 0.74 km^{2} (0.29 sq mi)
- Elevation: 228 m (748 ft)

Population (2021)
  - Total: 76
  - Density: 102.2/km^{2} (265/sq mi)
- Time zone: UTC−07:00 (PT)

Spences Bridge is a community in the Canadian province of British Columbia, situated 35 km (22 mi) north east of Lytton and 44 km (27 mi) south of Ashcroft. At Spences Bridge the Trans-Canada Highway crosses the Thompson River. In 1892, Spences Bridge's population included 32 people of European ancestry and 130 First Nations people. There were five general stores, three hotels, one Church of England church and one school. The principal industries are fruit growing and farming. The population as of the 2021 Canadian census was 76, a decrease of 23.2 per cent from the 2016 count of 99.

== History ==
Nlaka'pamux Church

The Kettle Valley Railway included a spur line stretching from Merritt to Spences Bridge. The rail bed is still intact, along with the original bridges.

This settlement was originally known as Cook's Ferry because from 1862 to 1866 Mortimer Cook operated a ferry for crossing the river. The ferry was replaced by a toll bridge built by Thomas Spence under government contract.

In 1891, the subdistrict of Spences Bridge had a population of 307.

In 1905, one of the worst landslides in BC history hit a First Nations village near Spences Bridge. The village was destroyed and 18 people were killed.

On 1 January 2014, the old Spences Bridge, a one-lane steel truss bridge, was decommissioned and permanently closed to all pedestrian and vehicle traffic after 82 years of service. This was deemed necessary by British Columbia Ministry of Transportation and Infrastructure engineers due to the poor condition of the bridge.

== Location ==
North of Spences Bridge is Ashcroft (44 km [27 mi]) and Cache Creek (50 km [31 mi]). Also north is 100 Mile House (162 km [101 mi]), Williams Lake (254 km [158 mi]), Quesnel (371 km [231 mi]), and Prince George (492 km [306 mi]). South of Spences Bridge is Lytton (35 km [22 mi]), Hope (143 km [89 mi]), and Vancouver (295 km [183 mi]). East of the town is Merritt (65 km [40 mi]) and Kelowna (192 km [119 mi]).

Spences Bridge's location is mountainous, with higher elevations part of the Interior Plateau. The east side of the Fraser here is part of the Clear Range, a mountainous southwards extension of the Fraser Plateau located in the angle of the Thompson and Fraser Rivers. Arthur Seat lies in that range on the west side of Spences Bridge, and was named by pioneer John Murray for Arthur's Seat in Edinburgh, Scotland.

== Climate ==
Spences Bridge has a semi-arid climate (Köppen climate classification BSk). The climate is very dry and mild by Canadian standards, with an average annual precipitation of just 263.7 mm (10.38 in) and low average snowfall of 30.4 cm (12.0 in) per year. Winters are short and moderately cold for usually brief periods and sunshine hours are very low for a couple of months, while summers are quite long, hot, sunny and dry – compared to the rest of Canada, albeit with comfortable nights. Like much of the lower-altitude valleys in the Thompson Nicola region, there are more days (on average approx. 40 days per year) when temperature exceeds 32 °C (90 °F) than remain below freezing.

Spences Bridge recorded Canada's second highest temperature on June 29, 2021, when it reached 48.6 °C (119.5 °F). The record is second only to Lytton, which recorded 49.6 °C (121.3 °F) on the same day. However, Lytton had 2 weather stations and one of them recorded a temperature 1 °C (1.8 °F) lower than the other at 48.6 °C (119.5 °F). The station that recorded the higher temperature was later deemed to be correct. Otherwise, Spences Bridge would have been tied with Lytton for the highest recorded temperature in Canada.

Climate data for Spences Bridge Nicola Climate ID: 1167637; coordinates 50°25′19″N 121°18′53″W; elevation: 235 m (771 ft); 1981–2010 normals
Month	Jan	Feb	Mar	Apr	May	Jun	Jul	Aug	Sep	Oct	Nov	Dec	Year
Record high °C (°F)	17.0 (62.6)	17.5 (63.5)	24.5 (76.1)	32.0 (89.6)	38.5 (101.3)	48.6 (119.5)	42.5 (108.5)	40.5 (104.9)	37.5 (99.5)	31.0 (87.8)	21.5 (70.7)	17.5 (63.5)	48.6 (119.5)
Mean daily maximum °C (°F)	0.7 (33.3)	5.0 (41.0)	12.4 (54.3)	17.8 (64.0)	22.3 (72.1)	25.9 (78.6)	29.6 (85.3)	29.7 (85.5)	24.2 (75.6)	14.7 (58.5)	5.9 (42.6)	0.1 (32.2)	15.7 (60.3)
Daily mean °C (°F)	−2.4 (27.7)	0.8 (33.4)	6.4 (43.5)	11.0 (51.8)	15.4 (59.7)	19.1 (66.4)	22.1 (71.8)	22.1 (71.8)	17.1 (62.8)	9.5 (49.1)	2.4 (36.3)	−2.8 (27.0)	10.1 (50.2)
Mean daily minimum °C (°F)	−5.6 (21.9)	−3.4 (25.9)	0.4 (32.7)	4.2 (39.6)	8.4 (47.1)	12.3 (54.1)	14.6 (58.3)	14.4 (57.9)	10.0 (50.0)	4.3 (39.7)	−1.0 (30.2)	−5.7 (21.7)	4.4 (39.9)
Record low °C (°F)	−33.9 (−29.0)	−32.2 (−26.0)	−18.9 (−2.0)	−9.4 (15.1)	−1.1 (30.0)	4.0 (39.2)	6.0 (42.8)	6.0 (42.8)	0.0 (32.0)	−19.5 (−3.1)	−29.0 (−20.2)	−28.5 (−19.3)	−33.9 (−29.0)
Average precipitation mm (inches)	18.8 (0.74)	12.4 (0.49)	12.5 (0.49)	13.8 (0.54)	25.6 (1.01)	29.6 (1.17)	30.0 (1.18)	22.2 (0.87)	23.5 (0.93)	22.1 (0.87)	26.4 (1.04)	27.0 (1.06)	263.7 (10.38)
Average rainfall mm (inches)	10.8 (0.43)	10.0 (0.39)	10.3 (0.41)	13.8 (0.54)	25.6 (1.01)	29.6 (1.17)	30.0 (1.18)	22.2 (0.87)	23.5 (0.93)	21.7 (0.85)	21.5 (0.85)	14.5 (0.57)	233.3 (9.19)
Average snowfall cm (inches)	7.9 (3.1)	2.4 (0.9)	2.2 (0.9)	0.0 (0.0)	0.0 (0.0)	0.0 (0.0)	0.0 (0.0)	0.0 (0.0)	0.0 (0.0)	0.4 (0.2)	5.0 (2.0)	12.5 (4.9)	30.4 (12.0)
Average precipitation days (≥ 0.2 mm)	6.7	5.6	5.6	4.6	6.9	7.6	6.7	5.6	6.0	6.9	9.5	7.4	79.0
Average rainy days (≥ 0.2 mm)	3.4	4.3	5.0	4.6	6.9	7.6	6.7	5.6	6.0	6.7	8.1	3.8	68.7
Average snowy days (≥ 0.2 cm)	3.6	1.4	0.7	0.0	0.0	0.0	0.0	0.0	0.0	0.2	1.7	4.1	11.7
Source: Environment and Climate Change Canada Canadian Climate Normals 1981–2010

== Pioneers of Spences Bridge ==
- John Murray
- James Teit (ethnographer)
- Archibald Clemes
- Pierre Morens
- Francoise Rey

== See also ==
- Fraser Canyon Gold Rush
- Cook's Ferry Indian Band
- Cariboo Road
- Cariboo Gold Rush
