= Fraser Plateau and Basin complex =

Temperate coniferous forest ecoregion in British Columbia, Canada

Coordinates: 54.0000°N 126.0000°W

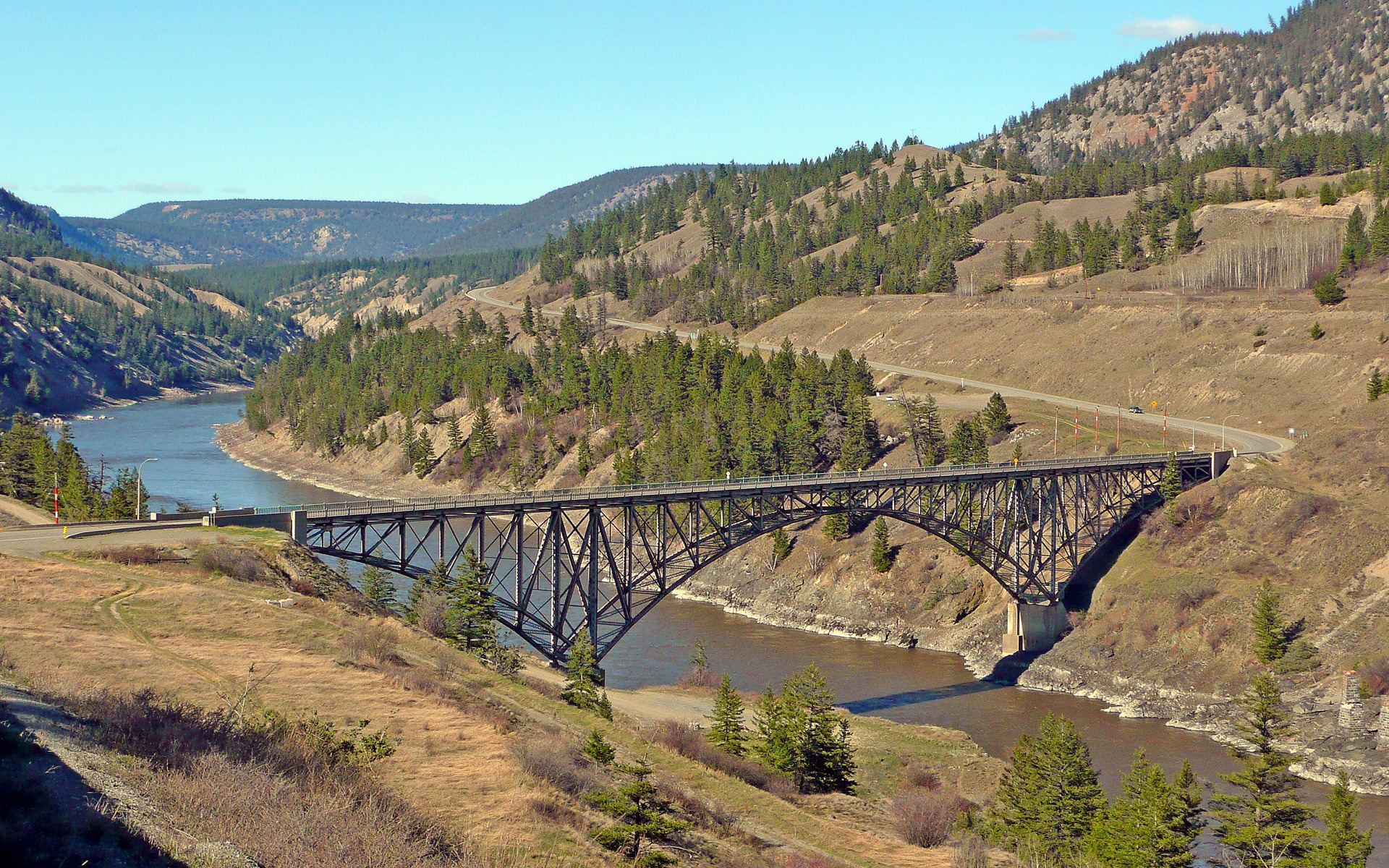
- Forests of the Fraser Plateau southwest of Williams Lake, British Columbia

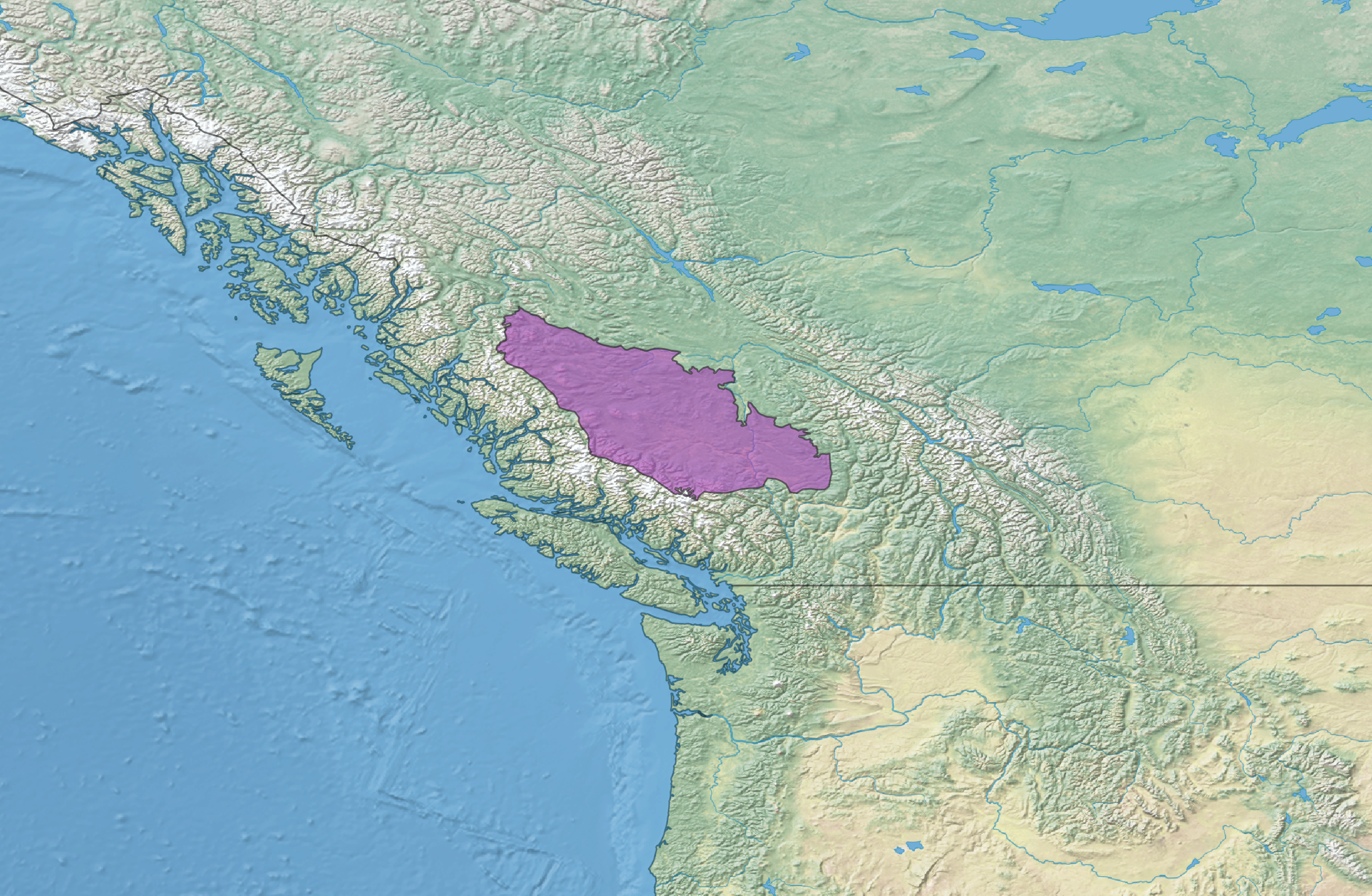
- Map of the Fraser Plateau and Basin Conifer Forests

Ecology
- Realm: Nearctic
- Biome: Temperate coniferous forests
- Borders: List: British Columbia mainland coastal forests; Cascade Mountains leeward forests; Central British Columbia Mountain forests; North Central Rockies forests; Northern transitional alpine forests; Okanagan dry forests
- Bird species: 172
- Mammal species: 61

Geography
- Area: 137,100 km^{2} (52,900 mi^{2})
- Country: Canada
- State: British Columbia
- Rivers: Fraser River

Conservation
- Conservation status: Critical/Endangered
- Habitat loss: 1.0747%
- Protected: 8.55%

The Fraser Plateau and Basin Complex is an ecoregion defined by the World Wildlife Fund. It encompasses the middle reaches of the watershed of the Fraser River as it traverses the northern part of the Interior Plateau of British Columbia. The WWF ecoregion is similar in description to two of the ecoregions within Environment Canada's Montane Cordillera Ecozone: The Fraser Basin and the Fraser Plateau. Much of the Fraser Plateau is underlain by volcanic rocks, with steep escarpments along rivers and creeks and almost flat upper surfaces.

Physiographically, the Fraser Basin is a section of the larger Northern Plateaus province, which is part of the larger Intermontane Plateaus physiographic division.

== See also ==
- List of ecoregions in Canada (WWF)
