= Interior Plateau =

Region in Interior of British Columbia, Canada

- Plateau
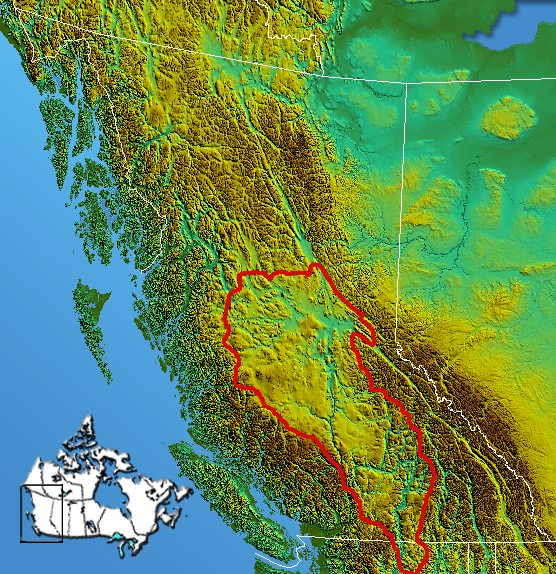
- Boundary of the Interior Plateau (shown including Okanagan, Shuswap and Quesnel Highlands)
- Coordinates: 52°00′00″N 123°00′00″W
- Location: British Columbia and Washington
- Part of: Intermontane Plateaus

The Interior Plateau comprises a large region of the Interior of British Columbia, and lies between the Cariboo and Monashee Mountains on the east, and the Hazelton Mountains, Coast Mountains and Cascade Range on the west. The continuation of the plateau into the United States is known there as the Columbia Plateau.

Physiographically, the Interior Plateau is a section of the larger Northern Plateaus province, which in turn is part of the Intermontane Plateaus physiographic division.

The Interior Plateau is not part of the Interior Mountains, a huge area that constitutes most of the northern two thirds of the Canadian province of British Columbia between the Coast Mountains, Rocky Mountains and the various small ranges on the inland lea of the Coast Mountains between the Bulkley Ranges and the Bella Coola River.

== Subdivisions ==
It has several subdivisions, these being:

- The Fraser Plateau
  - The Chilcotin Plateau
  - The Cariboo Plateau
    - The Bonaparte Plateau (part of the Thompson Plateau in some definitions, and also known as the Kamloops Plateau)
  - The Nechako Plateau
    - The McGregor Plateau
- The Thompson Plateau

The Cariboo and Chilcotin Plateaus are separated by the Fraser River. The Nechako Plateau flanks the Fraser on both sides; its southern boundary is defined by the West Road River (aka the Blackwater River) and the Quesnel River, and its northern boundary consists of the Omineca Mountains and the Cassiar Mountains, which are two major subdivisions of the Interior Mountains.

== Mountain ranges ==
Several mountain ranges and hill-systems are included in the definition of this region such as the following:

- the Pavilion Range includes:
  - The Clear Range (includes the Scarped Range)
  - The Marble Range
  - The Cornwall Hills (not formally part of the Pavilion Range, but adjoining the Clear Range on its east)
  - The Trachyte Hills (not formally part of the Pavilion Range, but adjoining the Clear and Marble Ranges on their east)
- The Arrowstone Hills (SW edge of the Bonaparte Plateau)
- The Rainbow Range (sometimes assigned to either the Pacific Ranges or Kitimat Ranges subranges of the Coast Mountains)
- The Itcha Range
- The Ilgachuz Range
- The Quanchus Range (western edge of the Nechako Plateau, in the midst of the Nechako Reservoir/Ootsa Lake)
- The Telegraph Range (Nechako Plateau)
- The Fawnie Range (Nechako Plateau)
- The Pattullo Range (sometimes classified as part of the Hazelton Mountains)

Some classifications systems assign the Pattullo Rangez to the Hazelton Mountains, which are part of the larger Skeena Mountains complex, but then theoretically so zalso is the Quanchus Range. Also, the Cariboo Mountains are sometimes included as part of the Interior Plateau.

Three areas liminal to the plateau, i.e. sometimes considered part of it rather than the adjoining mountain ranges, are the Shuswap Highland, Okanagan Highland and Quesnel Highland.

== History ==
The location of the Interior Plateau in North America is between the Rocky Mountains and the Pacific Coast Ranges.

It is cut by the basins and tributaries of two rivers: the Columbia and the Fraser. The northern region is largely wooded, except in lowland and more southerly areas which resemble the sagebrush grasslands which typify the southern part of the plateau in the Columbia drainage.

The first documented human presence was in 8500 BC. Bison remains, Clovis and other fluted points date back to this time frame. An important sites in the area is at Wenatchee site (located in Washington).

The Windust phase is dated between 10600 BC and 7100 BC. At the Lind Coulee Archaeological Site in east-central Washington, leaf-shaped projectile points and knives date between 8500 and 5500 BC. Based on archaeological evidence, it is suggested that these people were hunters, subsisting also from fishing and plant gathering. The presence of sea shells gives an indication that trading took place. A small, oval-shaped dwelling was also found at the Paulina Lake site in Oregon, dating to 7100 BC.

The Cascade phase took place from 7100 to 4300 BC, and was marked by a slight change in toolkit technology from the Windust peoples. A residential structure was found for this group, dating between 5500 and 4300 BC. Other pithouses followed between 4000 and 2000 BC. Most residential structures are located on rivers. During the historic era, plants and salmon were the staple foods, which give us an indication that Cascade groups harvested salmon runs in the summer and fall.

The Late Period, dated to about 2500 BC, the pithouse (quiggly hole) came into existence, such as those at the Keatley Creek Archaeological Site. Other markers of this period include the increasing number of pithouses and settlements. Fishing continued to increase, and technology advanced, introducing more specialized barb fish spears and composite toggling harpoons. Other technology was used as well, including nets and weirs. Trade networks also flourished during this time, using sea shells, turquoise, fish grease and others.

== See also ==
- Columbia River Plateau
- Chilcotin Group

== Sources ==
- Fagan, Brian M. Ancient North America. London: Thames and Hudson, Ltd., 2005
