= Chris Creek (British Columbia) =

Creek in British Columbia, Canada

Criss Creek

Location
- Country: Canada
- Province: British Columbia

Physical characteristics
- Source: Confluence of the North & South Thompson Rivers
- Mouth: Deadman River
  - coordinates: 50°52′49″N 120°58′13″W

Criss Creek is a tributary of the Deadman River in the British Columbia Interior, Canada. It is located on the Bonaparte Plateau north of the city of Kamloops.

== Name ==
It was named by locals after a rancher/packer named Christopher Pumpmaker who lived in the area in the 1860s. The name was later taken up by government surveyors and the name submitted to the Geographic Board of Canada.

== Surrounding area and uses ==
The area surrounding the creek is identified as an area of subsistence hunting by the Secwepemc First Nations. There are several ranches in the area which utilize the creek for irrigation. Additionally there have been low quality gold deposits discovered along the creek.
