= Ashcroft Manor Ranch =

Coordinates: 50.718715°N 121.328131°W

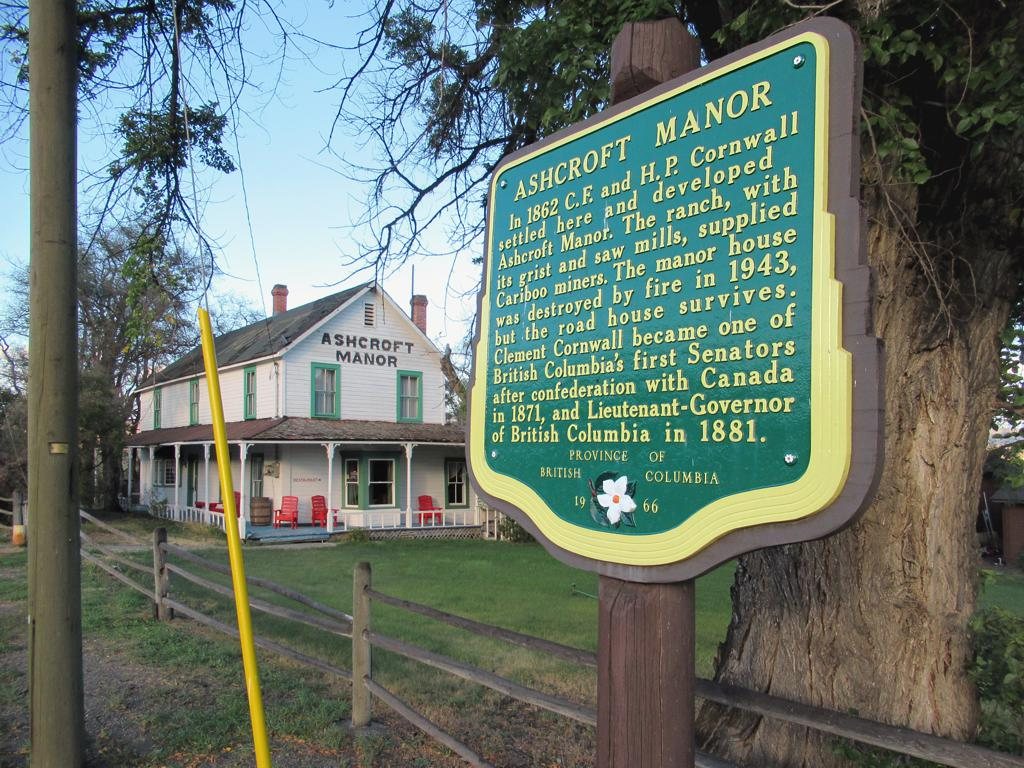
Ashcroft Manor Ranch in 2021

Ashcroft Manor Ranch, also known as Ashcroft Ranch, is a historic ranch in the Thompson Country of British Columbia, Canada, founded by Clement Francis Cornwall (later Lieutenant-Governor of British Columbia) and his brother, Henry Pennant Cornwall. Ashcroft Manor's main house and buildings are an historic site adjacent to the Trans-Canada Highway and west of the Canadian Pacific main line, which named its flag stop Ashcroft Station at the current site of the village of Ashcroft. The manor is 11 kilometres (7 mi) south of Cache Creek on BC Highway 1 at the access road junction to the village of Ashcroft below on the Thompson River.

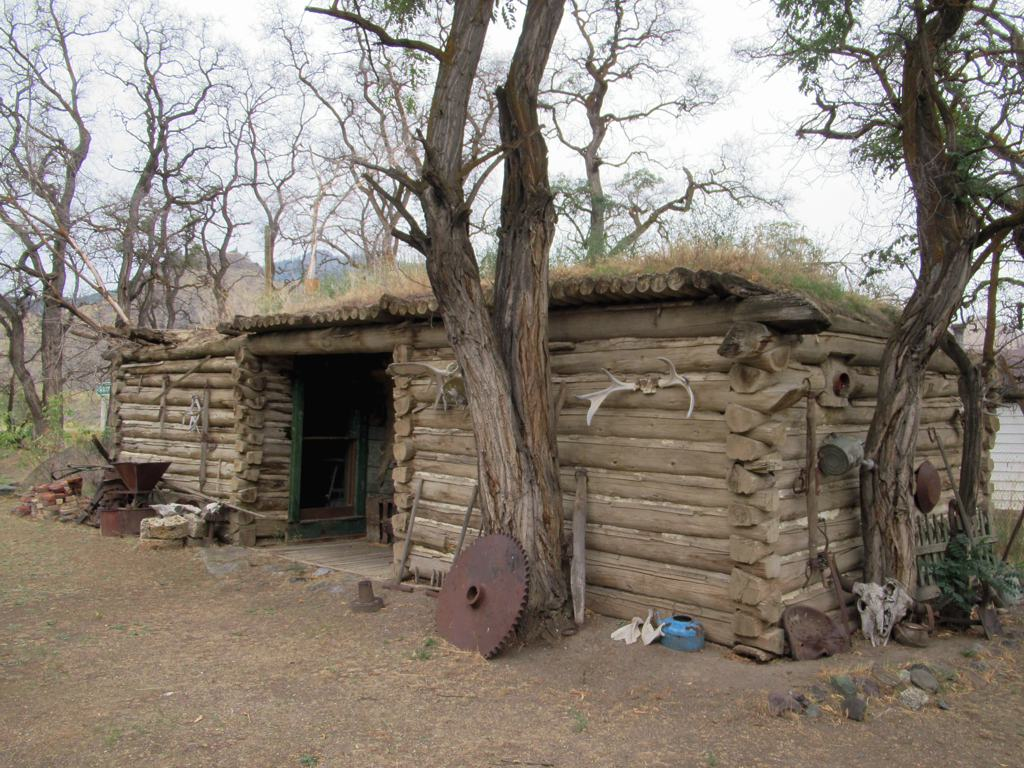
Ashcroft Manor Ranch sod building (1863). It once accommodated Chinese workers on Ashcroft Ranch.

In the heyday of the Cornwall brothers, Ashcroft Manor was one of the centres of British-style country life in the British Columbia Interior, and was famous for its fox-hunting parties and line of hounds, as well as race horses, and drew the early province's high society to these and other entertainments.

Overlooking Ashcroft Manor to the north is the Cache Creek Waste Disposal Facility. The name Cornwall Hills, referring to the southern part of the low hill-range between the Thompson and the upper basin of Hat Creek, is derived from that of the informal name of the ranch, the Cornwall Ranch. The Cornwall name is shared by Cornwall Creek, a tributary entering the Thompson River on the lower side of the ranch holdings.

== See also ==
- Cornwall Hills Provincial Park
- List of historic ranches in British Columbia
