= Tsintsunko Lakes Provincial Park =

Canadian provincial park

- IUCN category II (national park)
- Location within British Columbia
- Interactive map of Tsintsunko Lakes Provincial Park
- Location: British Columbia, Canada
- Nearest city: Kamloops
- Coordinates: 51°03′32″N 120°28′55″W
- Area: 3.53 km^{2} (1.36 sq mi)
- Established: April 30, 1996
- Governing body: BC Parks

Tsintsunko Lakes Provincial Park is a 333-hectare provincial park in British Columbia, Canada, located south of the Deadman River between Kamloops (SE) and Bonaparte Lake (NW). It is located on the Bonaparte Plateau. It was established April 30, 1996.

There is marked hiking in the park though it is a remote area and challenging to navigate. There are historic cabins in the park which are not maintained. The Tsintsunko trail was historically used by First Nations, cattlemen, guide outfitters and herders.

The park encompasses a portion of Tsintsunko Lake and Jolly Lake. These lakes contain wild stocks of rainbow trout. The park is a calving and summer habitat for moose.
