= Clement Francis Cornwall =

Canadian politician (1836–1910)

The Honourable Clement Francis Cornwall
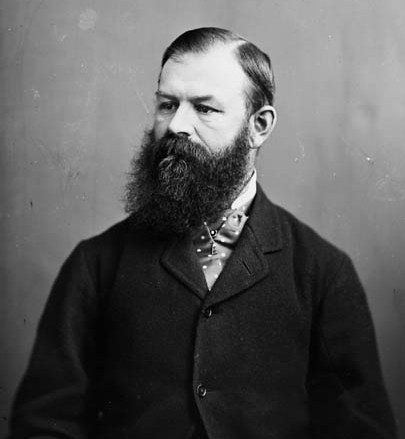

3rd Lieutenant Governor of British Columbia
- In office June 21, 1881 – February 8, 1887
- Monarch: Victoria
- Governors General: Marquess of Lorne; The Marquess of Lansdowne
- Premier: George Anthony Walkem; Robert Beaven; William Smithe
- Preceded by: Albert Norton Richards
- Succeeded by: Hugh Nelson

Canadian Senator from British Columbia
- In office 1871–1881
- Nominated by: John A. Macdonald

Member of the Legislative Council of British Columbia for Hope - Yale - Lytton District
- In office 1864–1866
- In office 1871–1871

Personal details
- Born: June 18, 1836 Ashcroft, Gloucestershire, England
- Died: February 15, 1910 (aged 73) Victoria, British Columbia, Canada
- Party: Conservative
- Spouse: Charlotte Pemberton
- Education: Trinity College, Cambridge; Magdalene College; Cambridge
- Occupation: Lawyer; rancher; politician

Clement Francis Cornwall (June 18, 1836 – February 15, 1910) was a Canadian parliamentarian and the third Lieutenant Governor of British Columbia.

== Background ==
Cornwall was born at Ashcroft House, in Newington Bagpath, near Wotton-under-Edge, Gloucestershire, England in 1836, son of the Reverend Alan Gardner Cornwall, the Anglican rector of Owlpen and Newington Bagpath, and Caroline Kingscote, of Kingscote, Gloucestershire. Both Cornwall's parents, though untitled, were able to trace their family lineages in England back as far as the Norman Conquest of 1066. After childhood education in private schools, Cornwall went to Trinity College, Cambridge but transferred to Magdalene College, Cambridge, graduating in 1858 with a Bachelor of Arts. He was called to the bar by the Society of the Inner Temple, London in 1862, but that same year he departed for and arrived in British Columbia.

Unlike nearly all others newly arrived in the colony, and despite touring the mining districts, Cornwall made no effort to pursue mining, choosing instead to focus on stock-raising and the legal profession. He spent time at his seasonal practice as lawyer at Wild Horse Creek, French Creek and in the Big Bend.

In 1864 Cornwall was elected to represent the Hope-Yale-Lytton riding for the newly created colonial Legislative Assembly, and was also a member of the same body in 1871 during the period in which British Columbia joined Canadian Confederation. Immediately after the new province entered Confederation, Cornwall was appointed to the Canadian senate and served in that capacity for ten years until accepting the invitation in 1881 to serve as Lieutenant-Governor of British Columbia. He had been appointed a provincial Justice of the Peace in 1864 and continued in that capacity until April, 1885; he retired from the office of Lieutenant-Governor in 1887. He was engaged in "rural pursuits" – the life of a gentleman rancher – from the time of his retirement until September 17, 1889, when he was appointed to the bench as Judge of the County Court of Cariboo, also receiving the title of Stipendiary Magistrate in the same year. He continued in that position until retiring to Victoria in 1906.

Cornwall was a member of many agricultural and pioneer societies, including the Dominion Council of Agriculture. In partnership with his brother Henry P. Cornwall, he managed a ranching operation which for many years was the province's largest supplier of livestock. Their cattle ranch near the confluence of the Bonaparte and Thompson Rivers was named for Cornwall's birthplace as Ashcroft Manor; the township as Ashcroft. The ranch also operated a gristmill, a sawmill, and a roadhouse. Both Cornwalls were avid proponents of "gentlemen's sports", especially horse-racing and fox-hunting. The Ashcroft Manor Ranch was memorable for its hunting parties, with Cornwall's select group of foxhounds, from the Duke of Beaufort's celebrated kennels, put in hot pursuit of the local coyotes instead of foxes, and lavish social entertainments for any guests visiting during the hunt. Ashcroft became one of the main horse-racing venues in the province at a time when that was the number-one sport, and Cornwall took a prominent part in their organization. In due course he became president of the British Columbia Jockey Club. The Cornwall Hills and Cornwall Creek, in the vicinity of the ranch, which was also known as the Cornwall Ranch, derive their name from the Cornwall brothers.

Cornwall, who was a member of the Church of England, was married to Charlotte Pemberton, daughter of the Reverend A.G. Pemberton of Kensal Green, London. Charlotte was also cousin to Joseph Despard Pemberton and sister-in-law of Benjamin Pearse.
