= Botanie Valley =

Coordinates: 50.316°N 121.551°W

Botanie Valley is in British Columbia's southern interior near Lytton. It is a traditional food source for the Nlaka'pamux people. The name itself means "covering" possibly referring to the abundant plant life covering the area. Botanie Creek enters the Thompson River a few kilometres upstream of its confluence with the Fraser River, making Botanie the Thompson River's last tributary.

== History ==
Due to the centrality of its location between the larger Thompson and Fraser watersheds, the Valley was a traditional First Nations meeting place. It was not only a meeting place for people of the Nlaka'pamux nation. Secwepemc, Stl'atl'imx and others met, sometimes as many as a thousand at a time. Ethnobiologist, Nancy Turner said of these meetings, "They met, at least in part, to take advantage of the great abundance of a number of different "root" vegetables and berries to be found there. Also important was the cultural "glue" created at these gatherings, where women harvested plant foods, men hunted, and everyone traded and socialized". The Valley was settled by Europeans in 1876. It has been used for ranching and homesteading since that time. In 1926 a small dam was built, creating Botanie Lake. In modern times the Lytton First Nation has hosted an annual Healing Gathering at Pasulko Lake.

== Ecology ==
Botanie Valley has a rich diversity of plant life owing in part to its location between the rainy Coastal Mountain Range and the dryer Interior Plateau. Occurrence of wildfires also turns forest lands into diverse flower meadows in the higher sub-alpine elevations. In 1978, in an attempt to preserve this diversity, the Province of British Columbia created the Skwaha Lake Ecological Reserve. The reserve contains four blue listed species, and two redlisted species, Nuttall's Sunflower and Oniongrass. Invasive species and climate change are named as threats to these species.
