= Porcupine Meadows Provincial Park =

Canadian provincial park

- IUCN category II (national park)
- Location within British Columbia
- Interactive map of Porcupine Meadows Provincial Park
- Location: British Columbia, Canada
- Nearest city: Kamloops
- Coordinates: 50°59′01″N 120°32′10″W
- Area: 27.04 km^{2} (10.44 sq mi)
- Established: April 30, 1996
- Governing body: BC Parks

Porcupine Meadows Provincial Park is a 2,704 hectare provincial park in British Columbia, Canada, located north of Tranquille Lake to the northwest of Kamloops. Its name is a direct translation of the Shuswap word for this area, "pisitsoolsia", named so for the numerous porcupine in the area.

== Region ==
The park is on the southern end of the Bonaparte Plateau. It contains extensive sub-alpine wetlands, meadows and old growth forests. It is the highest elevation between Kamloops and 100 Mile House on the west side of the North Thompson River.

== History ==
The park was established on April 30, 1996. The area was previously a pack-trail connecting Pass Lake and Porcupine Ridge, though the area is now unsettled.

== Wildlife ==
Wildlife in the area includes many bird species including sandhill cranes, as well as moose and mule deer.

== Recreational access and facilities ==
Park access is from the southeast off Watching Creek Forest Service Road. There is no motorized access through the park itself, other than snowmobile access in the winter. Passing through the park is the Masters Sub-alpine Trek hiking trail, which is currently in a state of disrepair due to surrounding logging. The park can also be accessed by snowshoe and via horseback on designated trails.

The park is considered a wilderness area with limited patrols. There are no formal facilities within the park. An old forestry lookout is present and can serve as an emergency lookout.
