= Trachyte Hills =

Hill group in British Columbia, Canada

Highest point
- Elevation: 1,603 m (5,259 ft)
- Prominence: 300 m (980 ft)
- Coordinates: 50°48′13″N 121°29′50″W

Geography
- Country: Canada
- Region: British Columbia

The Trachyte Hills are a small, hilly mountain range in southern British Columbia, Canada, located southwest of the junction of Bonaparte River and Hat Creek. They are a continuation northwards of the Cornwall Hills.
