= Cariboo Plateau =

Geographic feature in British Columbia, Canada

- Plateau
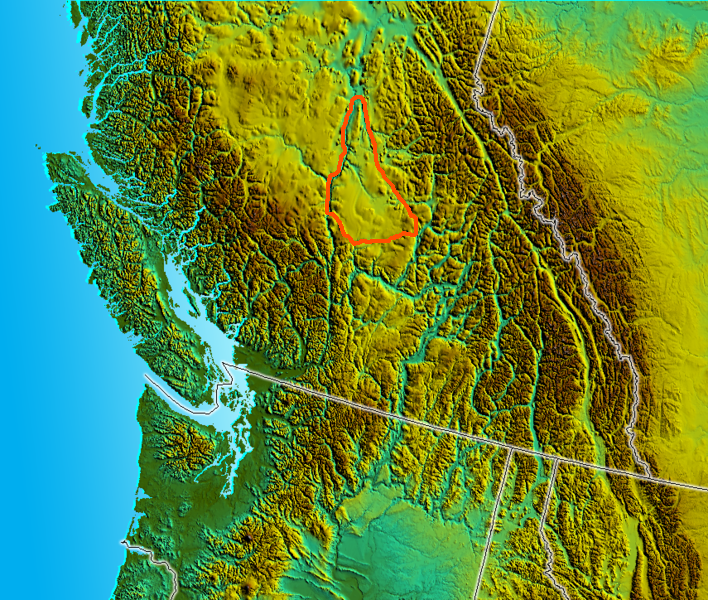
- Location of the Cariboo Plateau proper
- Coordinates: 51°42′32″N 121°33′00″W
- Location: British Columbia, Canada
- Part of: Fraser Plateau
- Geology: Flood basalt

The Cariboo Plateau is a volcanic plateau in south-central British Columbia, Canada. It is part of the Fraser Plateau which is a northward extension of the North American Plateau. The southern limit of the plateau is the Bonaparte River although some definitions include the Bonaparte Plateau between that river and the Thompson, but it properly is a subdivision of the Thompson Plateau. The portion of the Fraser Plateau west of the Fraser River is properly known as the Chilcotin Plateau but is often mistakenly considered to be part of the Cariboo Plateau, which is east of the Fraser.

As a region and historical identity, the Cariboo is sometimes considered to extend to the Thompson River to the south of that, and to border on the city of Kamloops at its southeastern corner and even as far as Lytton, at the confluence of the Fraser and Thompson Rivers. The town of Lillooet is generally considered to be in the Cariboo, while the Bridge River Country to its west was sometimes referred to as the West Cariboo, as were also the ranches along the west side of the Fraser northwards towards the Gang Ranch. Broader meanings of "the Cariboo" sometimes include the Chilcotin, west of the Fraser. The geographic region known as the Quesnel Highland, which forms a mountainous series of foothills between the plateau proper and the Cariboo Mountains, is likewise considered to be part of the Cariboo in a cultural-historical sense – not the least because it is the location of the famous Cariboo goldfields and the one-time economic capital of the Interior of British Columbia, Barkerville.

The Cariboo is commonly divided into North Cariboo, Central Cariboo and South Cariboo. The commercial centre of the north is Quesnel, of the central Williams Lake and of the south 100 Mile House. The Cariboo region is generally considered to reach as far southeast as the city of Kamloops and to include the Cache Creek and Lillooet areas in the south. The region west of the Fraser River north of Lillooet, the Chilcotin, is often considered to be a part of the Cariboo; the country south of it immediately west of Lillooet is sometimes referred to as the West Cariboo.

The Cariboo Plateau is made of Late Miocene flood basalt lavas of the Chilcotin Group, a group of related volcanic rocks that is nearly parallel with the Fraser Plateau. It extends along the adjacent Garibaldi Volcanic Belt in the Coast Mountains. Volcanism of the Cariboo Plateau is considered to be a result of extension of the crust behind the coastal Cascadia subduction zone.

The Last Chance Lake and the Goodenough Lake beside it in the Bonaparte Plateau, as well as the Probe Lake and the Deer Lake in the Cariboo Plateau, are soda lakes.

Important events in the history of the Cariboo region:

- The Cariboo Gold Rush
- The building of the Cariboo Wagon Road
- The Chilcotin War of 1864

The Cariboo Trail is a 1950 film about the gold rush era of the 1890s in the area. The film is based on a story by John Rhodes Sturdy, screenplay by Frank Gruber, directed by Edwin L. Marin, and starring Randolph Scott and Gabby Hayes.

Bowron Lake Provincial Park is a popular canoeing destination in the Cariboo Mountains east of Quesnel. Wells Gray Park to its south is partly in the Cariboo.

== See also ==
- Cariboo
- Volcanism in Canada
