= Arthur Seat (Canada) =

Mountain in British Columbia, Canada

Coordinates: 50°24′28″N 121°25′39″W

- Location within British Columbia
- Interactive map of Arthur Seat

Highest point
- Elevation: 1,672 m (5,486 ft)

Geography
- Location: British Columbia
- Country: Canada

Arthur Seat, 1672 m (5486 ft), prominence 407 m, is a mountain in the Clear Range of the Southern Interior of British Columbia, Canada, located across the Thompson River from the settlement of Spences Bridge.

== Name origin ==
The name was inspired by Arthur's Seat overlooking Edinburgh, Scotland, by one of Spences Bridge's pre-eminent pioneers, John Murray.
