= Deadman River =

River in British Columbia, Canada

Coordinates: 50°44′40″N 120°55′5″W

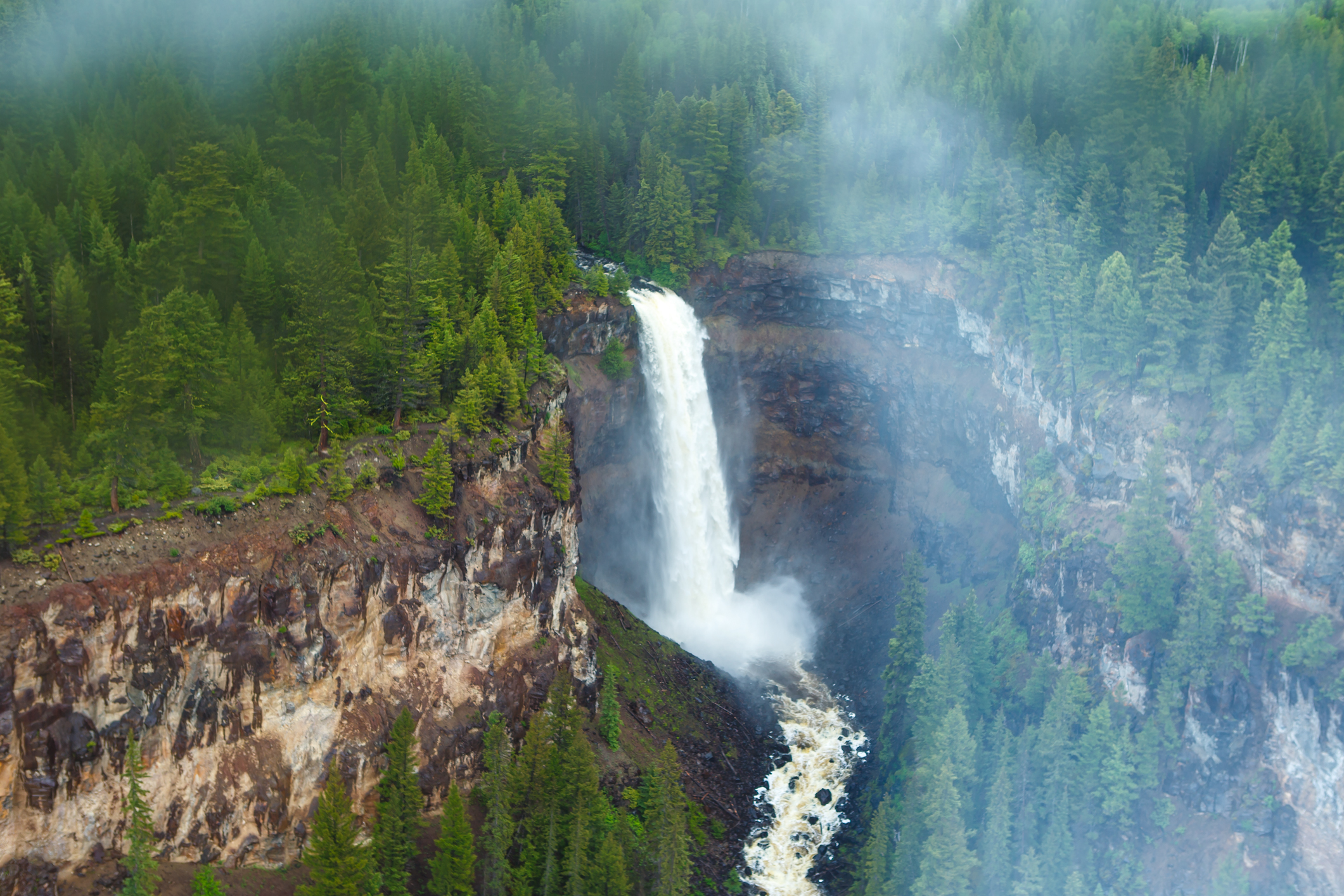
Nice waterfall at the North end of the Deadman River

The Deadman River, also known as the Deadman's River, Deadman Creek or Deadman's Creek, is a tributary of the Thompson River in the British Columbia Interior of British Columbia, Canada. It is about 70 kilometres (43 mi) in length.

== Name ==
The river's name dates back to 1817, when Pierre Charette of the North West Company was killed by his travelling companion in a quarrel over the campsite. In 1827 Archibald McDonald, of the Hudson's Bay Company, mapped it as Chivrette River. Other names the river has had include Knife, Dead, Defeant, Rivière du Défunt, and similar variants.

According to George Mercer Dawson the Shuswap name for the river is Hai in wohl, meaning a circle or detour.

== Course ==
The Deadman River originates in Hoover Lake, near Stockton Hill on the Bonaparte Plateau south of Bonaparte Lake. It flows south to join the Thompson River near Savona, west of Kamloops Lake. Its tributaries include Chris Creek.

== History ==
The lower portion of the river's route was a component in the Hudson's Bay Brigade Trail linking Fort Vancouver to the New Caledonia fur district and during the Cariboo Gold Rush was adopted by overland travellers heading north via the Okanagan to the Cariboo. One roadhouse along that route is now a ranch and guest house, the Vidette Lake Gold Mine Ranch, at Vidette, British Columbia, which is the site of Vidette Lake, proclaimed n recent decades by Tibetan monks to be the "Centre of the Universe."

The economy of the basin is ranching-based.

== See also ==
- List of rivers of British Columbia
- Castle Rock Hoodoos Provincial Park (formerly Deadman Hoodoos Provincial Park)
