= Fraser Plateau =

Plateau in British Columbia, Canada

- Plateau
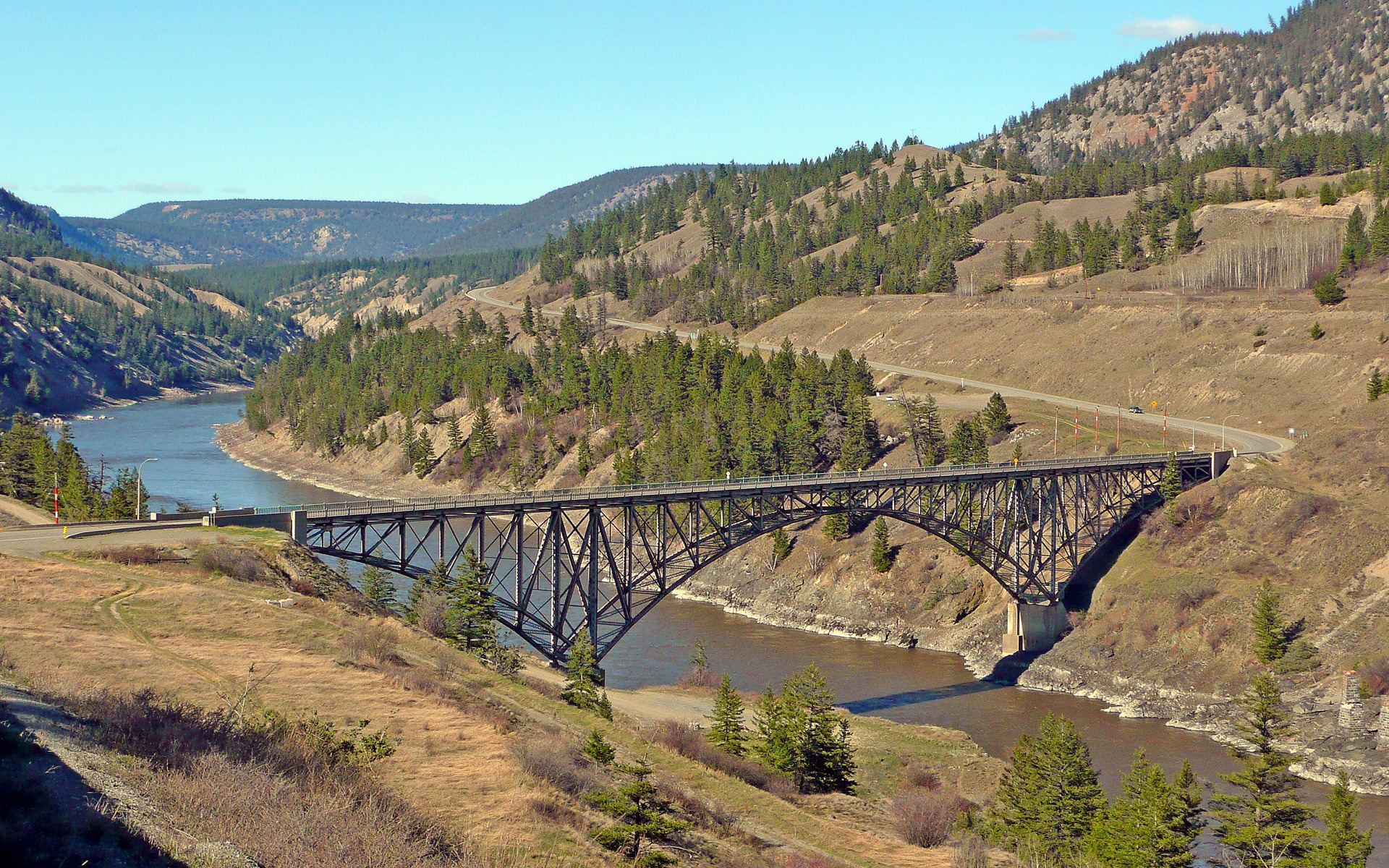
- Fraser Canyon southwest of Williams Lake

- Location within British Columbia
- Coordinates: 52°00′00″N 123°00′00″W
- Location: British Columbia, Canada
- Part of: Interior Plateau
- Geology: Flood basalt

The Fraser Plateau is an intermontane plateau. It is one of the main subdivisions of the Interior Plateau located in the Central Interior of British Columbia.

== Geography ==
The region includes the Cariboo Plateau and Chilcotin Plateau, and the adjoining Marble, Clear and Camelsfoot Ranges on its southwestern edge.

It is defined as lying between the Bonaparte River on its southeast, beyond which is the Bonaparte or Kamloops Plateau, part of the Thompson Plateau, and by a line formed by the Dean and West Road Rivers on its northwest (the Nechako Plateau lies to the north of the West Road).

Also included in the Fraser Plateau are the Itcha and Ilgachuz Ranges and the adjoining Rainbow Range, which adjoin the Coast Mountains.

== Geology ==
The Fraser Plateau consists of basaltic lava of the Chilcotin Group, a group of related volcanic rocks that is nearly parallel with the Fraser Plateau.

== See also ==
- Fraser Plateau and Basin complex (WWF ecoregion)

== Notes ==
=== References ===
- "Fraser Plateau". BC Geographical Names. Government of British Columbia – B.C. Geographical Names Office (BCGNO).
- Landforms of British Columbia, S. Holland, BC Govt publication, 1976
