= Shuswap Highland =

Highland in British Columbia, Canada

- Plateau
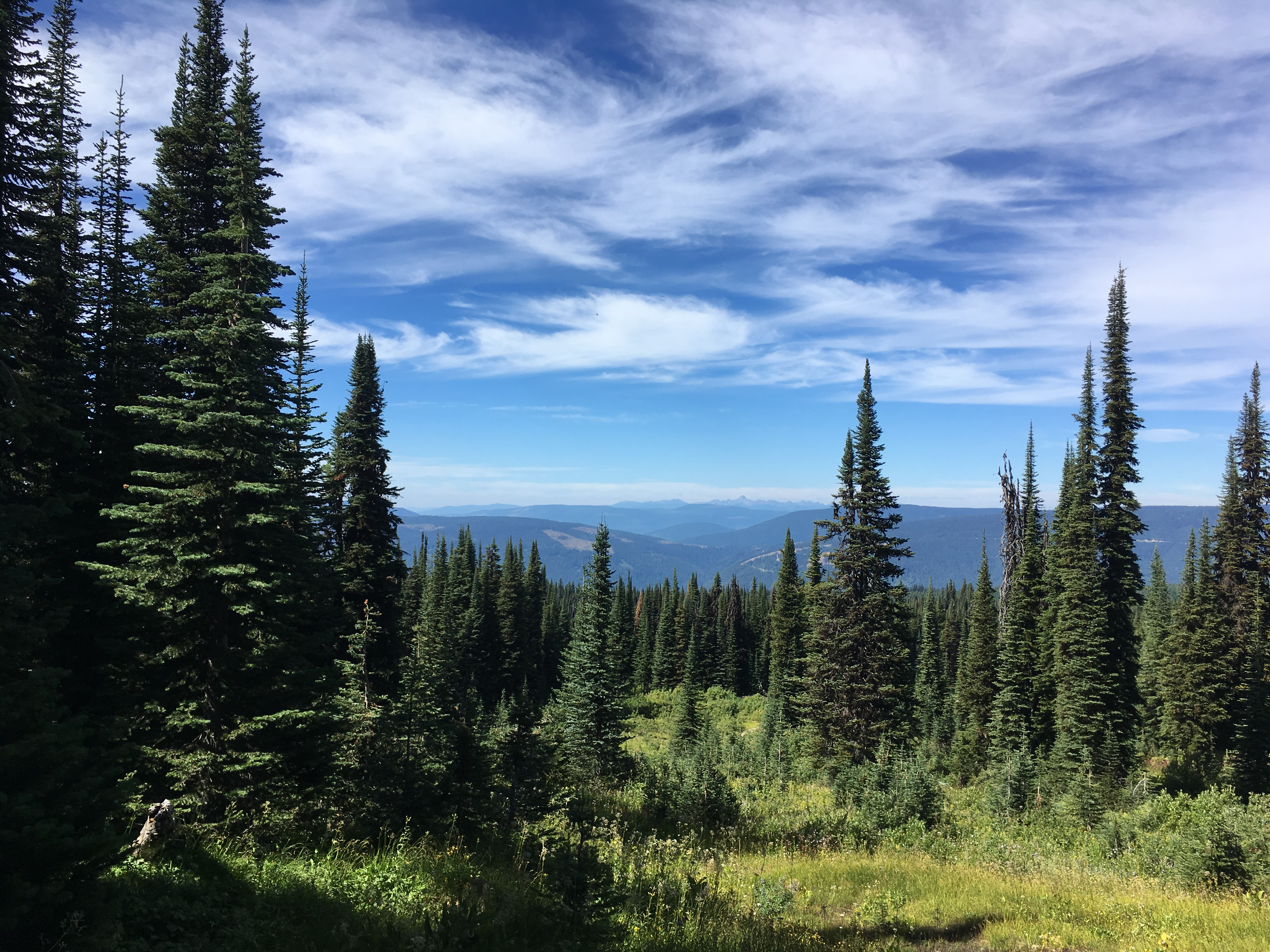
- Subalpine area on Crowsfoot Mountain, north of Shuswap Lake

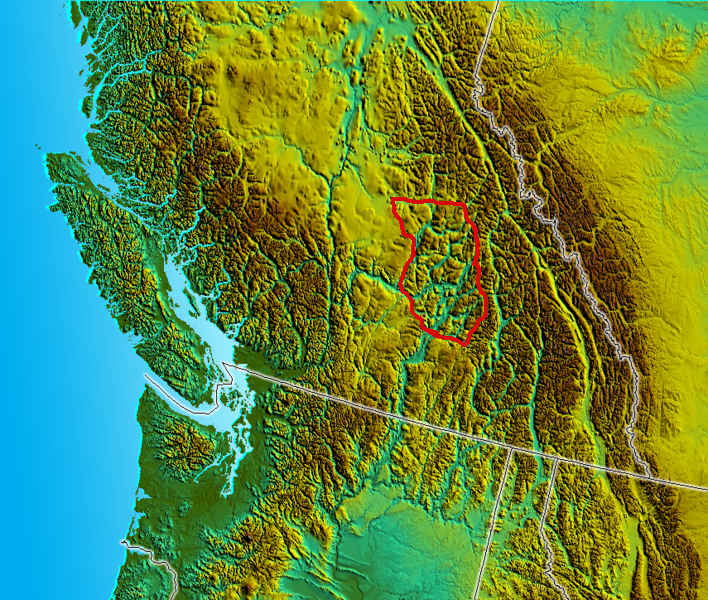
- Approximate boundary of the Shuswap Highland
- Coordinates: 51°15′N 119°20′W
- Location: British Columbia, Canada
- Part of: Bonaparte Plateau and Thompson Plateau

The Shuswap Highland is a plateau-like hilly area of 14,511 km^{2} (5,603 sq mi) in British Columbia, Canada. It spans the upland area between the Bonaparte and Thompson Plateaus from the area of Mahood Lake, at the southeast corner of the Cariboo Plateau, southeast towards the lower Shuswap River east of Vernon in the Okanagan.

The highland is not a unified range, but a combination of small uplands broken up by the valleys of the Clearwater, North Thompson and Adams Rivers and also by the lowlands in the southwest flanking Shuswap Lake. In that area of the valley are the towns of Falkland, Westwold, and Monte Creek along Highway 97. This area also includes the Spa Hills, and the other isolated pockets of hills and mini-plateaus between the Thompson Plateau proper and Shuswap Lake. The highest point of the Highland is Matterhorn Peak in the Dunn Peak massif at 2636 meters.

The Shuswap Highland is in essence a foothill (or transitional) area between the much broader interior plateaus southwest and west of it, and the mountainous terrain of the northern Monashee and Cariboo Mountains on the east/north-east.

Climates here range from sub-alpine in the mountains, especially further north, to a semi-arid, more temperate, continental climate that is found around Shuswap Lake.

== See also ==
- Okanagan Highland
- Quesnel Highland
- Geography of British Columbia
- Geology of British Columbia
- Geology of the Pacific Northwest
