= Nancy Turner =

Canadian ethnobiologist

Nancy Turner CM OBC FRSC FLS
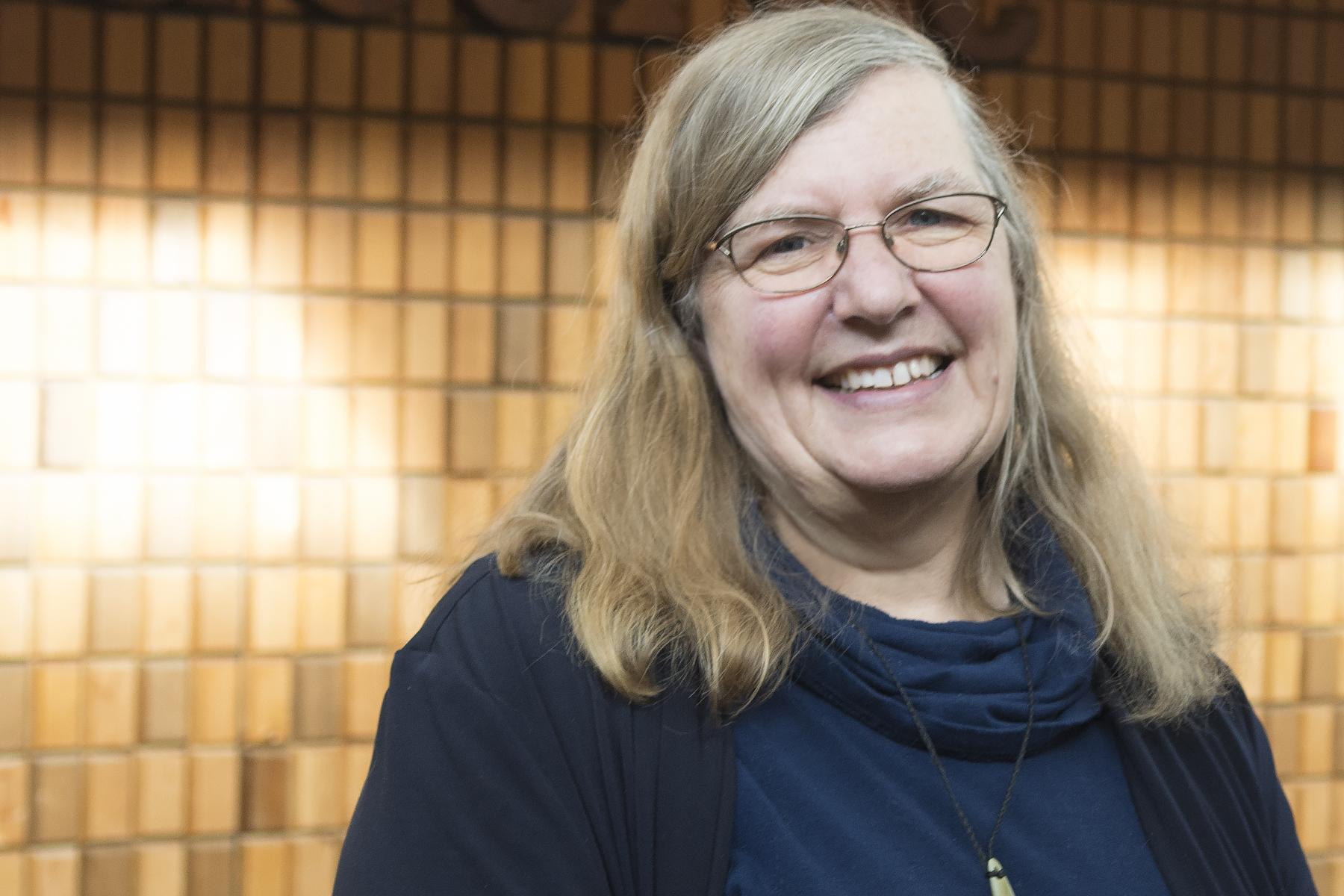
- Turner in 2015
- Born: Nancy Jean Turner; 1947 (age 78–79); Berkeley, California, U.S.
- Citizenship: Canada
- Education: University of British Columbia
- Known for: compendium of aboriginal culture and plant lore in British Columbia
- Awards: R.E. Schultes Award (1997); Order of British Columbia (1999); Canadian Botanical Association’s; Lawson Medal (2002); William L. Brown Award (2008); Order of Canada (2009)
- Scientific career
- Fields: Ethnobiology; Ethnobotany
- Workplaces: School of Environmental Studies, University of Victoria; Department of Botany, University of British Columbia (adjunct)
- Thesis: Plant taxonomic systems and ethnobotany of three contemporary Indian groups of the Pacific Northwest (Haida, Bella Coola, and Lillooet) (1973)

Nancy Jean Turner CM OBC FRSC FLS (born 1947) is a Canadian ethnobiologist, originally qualified in botany, who has done extensive research work with the indigenous peoples of British Columbia, the results of which she has documented in a number of books and numerous articles.

== Life ==
Turner was born in Berkeley in California in 1947 but moved to British Columbia when she was five. She obtained her doctorate in Ethnobotany after studying the Bella Coola, Haida and Lillooet indigenous groups of the Pacific North-West. She works by interviewing the groups' elder members to identify their names for plants and their uses. Comparison and scientific analysis of this data has enabled her to draw conclusions. Turner's research documented not only the role that plants have had in these groups' cultures but also the effects that Indigenous peoples have had historically on the landscape of Canada.

== Order of British Columbia ==
The Government of British Columbia admitted Nancy Turner to the Order of British Columbia in 1999 and describe her, her work, and her contributions as follows:

Nancy J. Turner ... is an internationally-distinguished scholar and scientist who has devoted her life to documenting the endangered knowledge of First Nations. As a pioneer in ethnobiology, her more than 25 years of research have focused on the diverse interactions of First Peoples in British Columbia with the ecosystems they depended on and the critical role of plant resources for foods, medicines and materials. Her research will be seen as a most valuable compendium of aboriginal culture and plant lore in British Columbia.

== Bibliography ==
=== Books written ===
- Turner, Nancy J. (1995). Food Plants of Coastal First Peoples. Royal British Columbia Museum Handbook series. UBC Press. ISBN 0-7726-5627-4.
- Turner, Nancy J. (1997). Food Plants of Interior First Peoples. Royal British Columbia Museum Handbook series. UBC Press. ISBN 978-0-7726-5846-3.
- Turner, Nancy J. (1998). Plant Technology of First Peoples in British Columbia. Royal British Columbia Museum Handbook series. UBC Press. ISBN 0-7718-8117-7.
- Turner, Nancy J. (2004). Plants of Haida Gwaii. Winlaw, B.C: Sono Nis Press. ISBN 1-55039-144-5.
- Turner, Nancy J. (2005). The Earth's Blanket, Traditional Teachings for Sustainable Living. Vancouver: Douglas & McIntyre. ISBN 1-55365-081-6.
- Turner, Nancy J.; Hebda, Richard J. (2012). Saanich ethnobotany: culturally important plants of the WSANEC people. Victoria, BC: Royal BC Museum. ISBN 978-0-7726-6577-5.
- Turner, Nancy J. (2014). Ancestral Pathways, Ancestral Knowledge: Ethnobotany and Ecological Knowledge of Indigenous Peoples of Northwestern North America. 2 vols. Kingston and Montreal: McGill-Queen's University Press. ISBN 978-0-7735-4380-5.
- Turner, Nancy J & Charlie, Luschiim Arvid (2021). Luschiim’s Plants: Traditional Indigenous Foods, Materials and Medicines Harbour Publishing. ISBN 9781550179453.

=== Books edited ===
- Deur, Douglas & Turner, Nancy J. (eds.) (2005) Keeping It Living, Traditions of Plant Use and Cultivation on the Northwest Coast of North America. Vancouver: UBC Press and Seattle: University of Washington Press.
- Turner, Nancy J., Marianne B. Ignace and Sandra L. Peacock, editors. (2016) Secwepemc people and plants : research papers in Shuswap ethnobotany. Tacoma, WA : Society of Ethnobiology. ISBN 978-0-9887-3305-3.
- Turner, Nancy J. (ed) (2020) Plants, People, and Places: The Roles of Ethnobotany and Ethnoecology in Indigenous Peoples' Land Rights in Canada and Beyond. Montreal: McGill-Queen's University Press. ISBN 978-0-2280-0183-6

=== Articles online ===
- Hunn, Eugene S; Turner, Nancy J; French, David H. "Ethnobiology and Subsistence" (PDF).
- Turner, Nancy. "Keeping it Living: Applications and Relevance of Traditional Plant Management in British Columbia to Sustainable Harvesting of Non-timber Forest Products" (PDF)..

== Distinctions ==
- R.E. Schultes Award (1997)
- Order of British Columbia (1999)
- Fellow of the Royal Society of Canada (1999)
- Canadian Botanical Association’s Lawson Medal (2002)
- Killam Research Fellowship (2007)
- William L. Brown Award for Excellence in Genetic Resource Conservation (2008)
- Order of Canada (2009)
- Honorary doctorate, University of Northern British Columbia (2014)
