= Cornwall Hills =

Hill group in British Columbia, Canada

Coordinates: 50°41′47″N 121°27′24″W

The Cornwall Hills are a range of mountainous hills in the Thompson Country of the Interior of British Columbia, Canada. They are located west and southwest of the communities of Cache Creek and Ashcroft and form the divide between the basin of the Thompson and that of Upper Hat Creek to the west. Named for Clement Francis Cornwall, distinguished colonist and later Lieutenant-Governor of British Columbia, and his brother Henry, who owned the Ashcroft Manor Ranch, also known as the Cornwall Ranch, which lay on the western slope of these hills. To their north are the Trachyte Hills, as far as the middle basin of Hat Creek and ending at Lower Hat Creek, and to their south is part of the Clear Range which forms the rest of the basin divide around Hat Creek.

== See also ==
- Cornwall Hills Provincial Park
