= Castle Rock Hoodoos Provincial Park =

Provincial park of British Columbia

- IUCN category II (national park)
- Location within British Columbia
- Interactive map of Castle Rock Hoodoos Provincial Park
- Location: Lillooet Land District, British Columbia, Canada
- Nearest city: Kamloops, BC
- Coordinates: 51°06′47″N 120°52′27″W
- Area: 16 ha (40 acres)
- Established: July 23, 1997
- Governing body: BC Parks

Castle Rock Hoodoos Provincial Park is a provincial park in British Columbia, Canada. Located on the Deadman Plateau northwest of Kamloops, the park was originally named Deadman Hoodoos Provincial Park and was created on July 23, 1997, and was 34 hectares in size. The park was reduced in size to 16 hectares on April 11, 2001, and renamed at the same time.
