= Hat Creek (British Columbia) =

River in Canada

Coordinates: 50°53′00″N 121°24′00″W

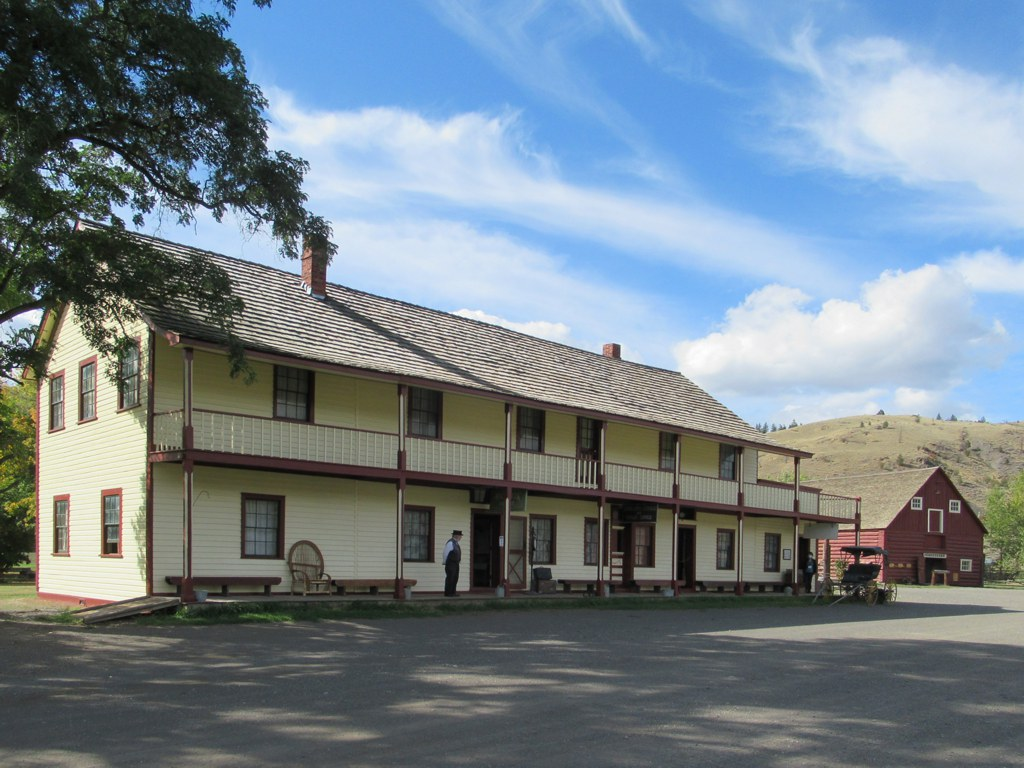
Hat Creek House, 12 km north of Cache Creek, British Columbia, Canada, was a roadhouse on the wagon road from Fort Yale to Barkerville.

Hat Creek is a tributary of the Bonaparte River in British Columbia, Canada, joining that stream at Carquile, which is also known as Lower Hat Creek and is the site of the Hat Creek Ranch heritage museum and visitor centre. The Hat Creek basin includes a broad upper plateau area encircled by the gentle but high summits of the Clear Range and, to its east, the Cornwall Hills; this area is known as Upper Hat Creek. Adjacent to Upper Hat Creek is the gateway to Marble Canyon and a rancherie of the Pavilion First Nation, who are both a St'at'imc and Secwepemc people. During the Fraser Canyon and Cariboo Gold Rushes an important trail northwards from the lower Fraser Canyon led from Foster Bar on the Fraser via Laluwissen Creek into Upper Hat Creek, then via the creek to the Bonaparte River. The economy of the basin is ranching-based and includes some of the oldest ranches in the British Columbia Interior. On the northwest edge of the Upper Hat Creek basin there is a large lignite deposit and several exploratory pits, some dating back to the 19th century but some more recent, part of an intended, but now shelved (at least temporarily) Hat Creek coal-thermal proposal.

== See also ==
- List of rivers of British Columbia
