= Bonaparte Plateau =

Plateau in British Columbia, Canada

- Plateau
- Location within British Columbia
- Coordinates: 51°09′00″N 121°17′00″W
- Location: British Columbia, Canada
- Part of: Thompson Plateau

The Bonaparte Plateau, in British Columbia, Canada, is a sub-plateau of the Thompson Plateau which extends to the Quesnel River and lies between the Cariboo Mountains on the east and the Fraser River on the west. The Thompson Plateau is itself a sub-plateau of the larger Fraser Plateau.

== Etymology ==
The name of the plateau comes from a chief of the Shuswap people who adopted the name Bonaparte in emulation of Napoleon Bonaparte, who for some reason was popular among the First Nations of British Columbia, apparently for his reputation as a chieftain and warrior.

== Geography ==
The Bonaparte Plateau lies between the Bonaparte River on the north and west, and the Thompson River on the east and south; on its northern edge is Bonaparte Lake, the largest in the locality and at the head of the Bonaparte River, near the edge of the plateau above the Thompson.

Other streams draining the plateau is the Deadman River, in fur trade times known by its French name, Rivière Defunté, which joins the Thompson River at Savona, and Loon Creek, which runs west from Loon Lake to join the Bonaparte River between the towns of Clinton and Cache Creek. In the SE portion of the plateau near Kamloops, both Bonaparte and Loon Lakes are known for their recreational fishing, and the plateau is covered in many lakes and ponds which attract fly-fishing aficionados from around the world (notably Hihium Lake). Porcupine Meadows Provincial Park is also located within this quadrant. Northeast of the Bonaparte Plateau there is a semi-mountainous region near the southern boundary of Wells Gray Provincial Park that is part of the Shuswap Highland (or the Quesnel Highland, depending on which definitions are used).

The Last Chance Lake and the Goodenough Lake beside it, as well as the Probe Lake and the Deer Lake in the Cariboo Plateau, are soda lakes.

The plateau is a mix of wilderness, large ranch holdings, and private recreational properties. The group of hills immediately northeast of Cache Creek have been preserved as the Arrowstone Hills Provincial Park. The Arrowstone Hills, the highest summit of which is 1,791 metres (5,876 ft), feature sand canyons, hoodoos and other unusual landforms and a rich wildlife population, including rattlesnake. The highest summit of the plateau overall is Silwhoiakun Mountain 1,870 metres (6,135 ft), at the top of the Silwhoiakun Plateau, which lies between Bonaparte Lake (N) and Kamloops Lake (S), between the Deadman River (W) and the North Thompson River (E).

=== Parks ===
- Arrowstone Hills Provincial Park
- Bonaparte Provincial Park
- Castle Rock Hoodoos Provincial Park
- Loon Lake Provincial Park
- Porcupine Meadows Provincial Park
- Tsintsunko Lakes Provincial Park
