= Thompson Plateau =

Plateau in British Columbia, Canada

- Plateau
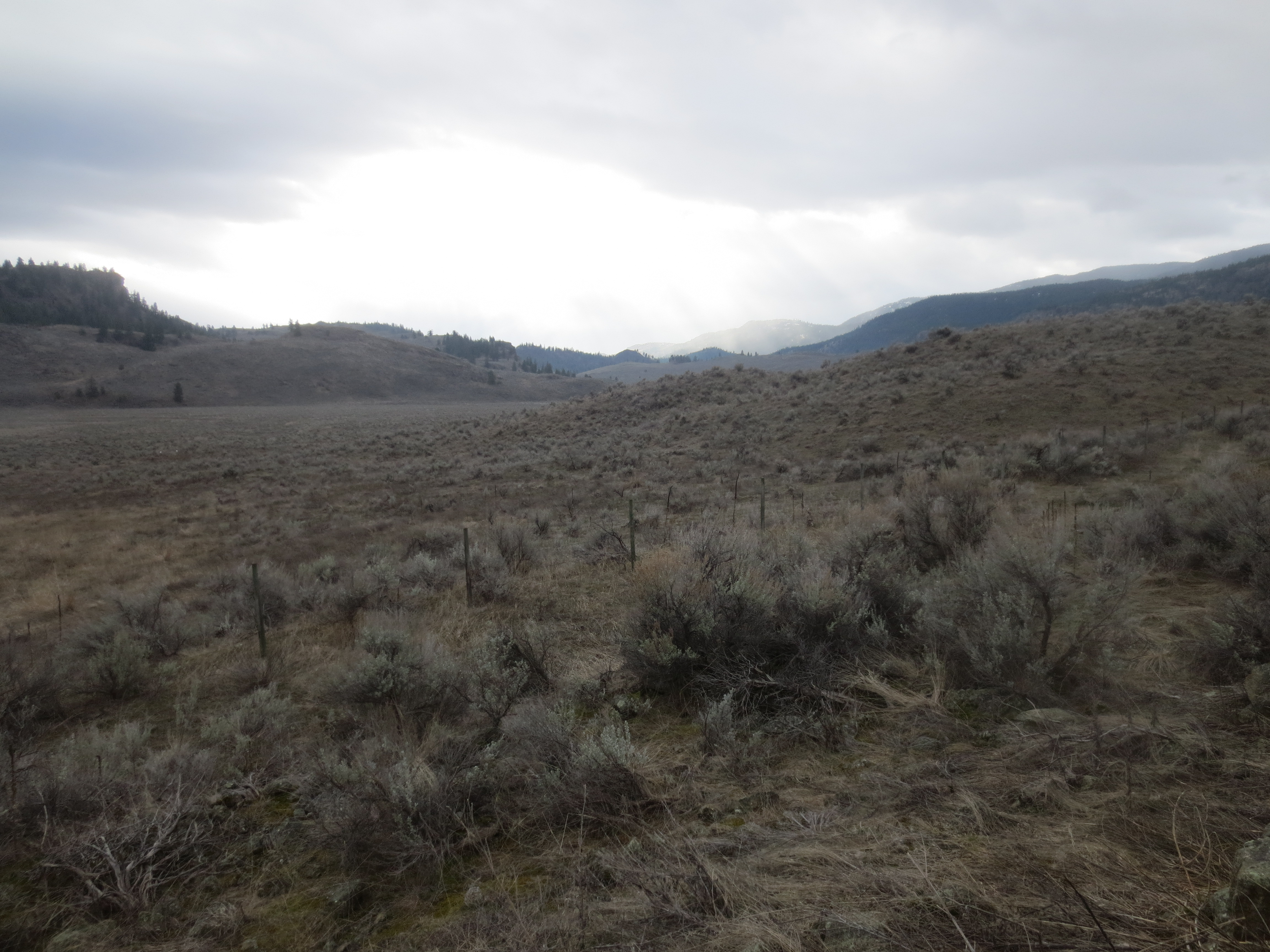
- Thompson Plateau, near the Dominion Radio Astrophysical Observatory

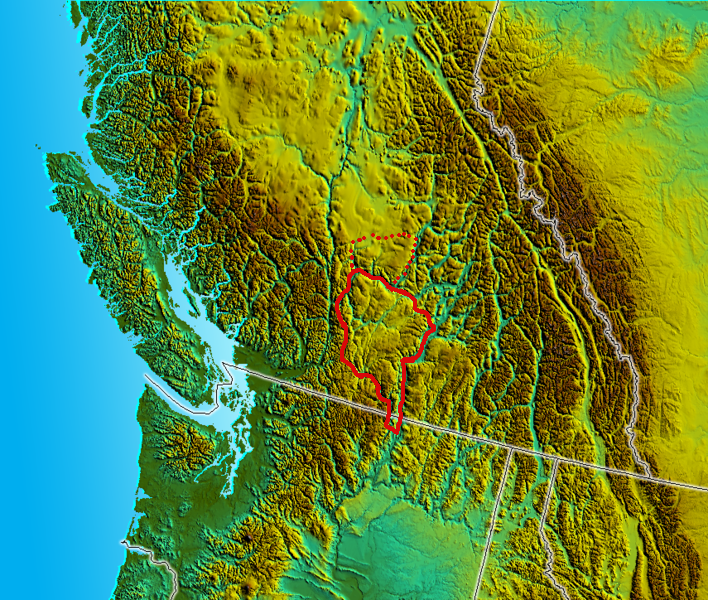
- Location map of the Thompson Plateau; dotted line is boundary of the Bonaparte Plateau.
- Coordinates: 50°15′00″N 120°30′00″W
- Part of: Interior Plateau
- Age: Mesozoic
- Geology: Flood basalt

The Thompson Plateau forms the southern portion of the Interior Plateau of British Columbia, Canada, lying to the west of Okanagan Lake, south of the Thompson River and east of (although never adjoining it) the Fraser River. At its most southern point the plateau is squeezed by the mountainous terrain of the Cascade Range abutting closer to the Okanagan Valley. Its southwestern edge abuts the Canadian Cascades portion of that extensive range, more or less following the line of the Similkameen River, its tributary the Tulameen River, and a series of passes from the area of Tulameen, British Columbia to the confluence of the Thompson River with the Nicoamen River, a few kilometres (miles) east of Lytton, British Columbia, which is in the Fraser Canyon. Its northeastern edge runs approximately from the city of Vernon, British Columbia through the valley of Monte Creek to the junction of the same name just east of the city of Kamloops. Northeast of that line is the Shuswap Highland.

Some definitions include the Bonaparte Plateau to the north, which lies in the angle of the Thompson and Bonaparte Rivers, and south of the uppermost reaches of that river and a small tributary of the North Thompson, Lemieux Creek.

The dominant landscape of the Thompson Plateau is a high, almost plains-like rangeland fairly heavily forested with subalpine forest and tamarack swamp where there exists a significant cattle ranching industry, but plunging steeply to the valleys of the Thompson and Okanagan on its outer perimeter which feature more semi-arid landscapes that include rattlesnakes, a ground-creeping variety of prickly pear cactus, sagebrush, and tumbleweed, in addition to fruit growing operations that often rely on irrigation. In its core is the broad and open rangeland of the Nicola Valley, at the focus of which is the town of Merritt, British Columbia. Towards its southern edges, the plateau is fairly mountainous and includes the ski area at Apex (west of Penticton), as well as the small but rugged Kruger Range which runs south from there to the confluence of the Similkameen and Okanagan Rivers.

== History ==
The Thompson Plateau contains Nicola Athapaskan, Nlaka'pamux and Syilx settlements. The Nlaka'pamux peoples of the plateau were known as Cawa'xamux or Tcawa'xamux

Nlaka'pamux settlements include:

- Kaptciʼtcîn
- Caʼxanîx
- xˑûʼtxˑûtkawêꞀ
- xanᴇxᴇwêꞀ
- Qaiskanaʼ or Koiskanaʼ
- Nˈaʼiᴇk or Nˈēʼiᴇk
- Tsuluʼs or Suluʼs
- Ptîʼtᴇk or Pᴇtuʼtᴇk
- Nsiʼsqᴇt
- Ntsʟaʼtko
- Zuxt
- Quîltcaʼna
- Ntcêʼkus or Stcêʼkus

Syilx settlements include:

- QêʼꞀamix or ʟkaꞀamix
- Spaʼxᴇmîn
- Komkonaʼtko
- Zuʼtsᴇmîn or Zuʼtsamîn

== Geology ==
The rocks underlying the Thompson Plateau originated in the Pacific and were appended to the North American Plate in the Mesozoic. These rocks were pervasively intruded by magmas now forming granitic rocks. These upland surfaces are now bordered by prominent valleys over 1,000 metres (3,300 ft) deep. This peneplain was overlain by thin sheets of plateau basalts formed from the Chilcotin Group lavas that flowed ten to fifteen million years ago.

The area was occupied by Pleistocene glaciation, and a thick mantle of glacial drift covers bedrock over a large part of it. The Pleistocene ended with a gradual stagnation and a wasting of the ice in place. As a consequence, on many slopes a series of channels was formed at successive levels as ice surfaces wasted.
