= Bonaparte River =

Watercourse in British Columbia, Canada

Coordinates: 50°44′20″N 121°15′30″W

The Bonaparte River is a tributary of the Thompson River, joining it at the community of Ashcroft, British Columbia. The river is about 150 kilometres (93 mi) long, including the 17 kilometres (11 mi) length of Bonaparte Lake. Rising on the Silwhoiakun Plateau to the northwest of Kamloops, the Bonaparte River flows west and south to join the Thompson River.

The river's name first appears on a map made in 1827 by Archibald McDonald of the Hudson's Bay Company. The name probably honors Napoleon Bonaparte, who died in 1821. The Secwepemc name for the river is Kluhtows, which means "gravelly river". Over one-third of the river's watershed was burned over in the 2017 Elephant Hill fire, leading to increased erosion and sediment in the river.

== See also ==
- List of rivers of British Columbia
- List of tributaries of the Fraser River
