= British Columbia Highway 1 =

Provincial highway in British Columbia, Canada; part of Trans-Canada Highway

Highway 1
- Trans-Canada Highway
- Hwy 1 highlighted in red

Route information
- Maintained by the Ministry of Transportation and Infrastructure
- Length: 1,047 km (651 mi)
- Existed: 1941–present

Vancouver Island section
- Length: 116 km (72 mi)
- South end: Dallas Road in Victoria
- Major intersections: Highway 17 in Victoria; Highway 14 in Langford; Highway 18 in North Cowichan; Highway 19 / Highway 19A in Nanaimo
- North end: Departure Bay Ferry Terminal in Nanaimo

Mainland section
- Length: 877 km (545 mi)
- West end: Horseshoe Bay Ferry Terminal in West Vancouver
- Major intersections: Highway 99 in West Vancouver; Highway 7 / Highway 7B in Coquitlam; Highway 15 / Highway 17 in Surrey; Highway 11 in Abbotsford; Highway 3 / Highway 5 (YH) in Hope; Highway 97 from Cache Creek to Monte Creek; Highway 5 (YH) in Kamloops; Highway 97B in Salmon Arm; Highway 97A in Sicamous; Highway 95 in Golden
- East end: Highway 1 (TCH) at the Alberta border at Kicking Horse Pass

Location
- Country: Canada
- Province: British Columbia
- Regional districts: Capital, Cowichan Valley, Nanaimo; Metro Vancouver, Fraser Valley, Thompson-Nicola, Columbia-Shuswap

Highway system
- British Columbia provincial highways
← Highway 395	→ Highway 1A

Highway 1 is a provincial highway in British Columbia, Canada, that carries the main route of the Trans-Canada Highway (TCH). The highway is 1,047 kilometres (651 mi) long and connects Vancouver Island, the Greater Vancouver region in the Lower Mainland, and the Interior. It is the westernmost portion of the main TCH to be numbered "Highway 1", which continues through Western Canada and extends to the Manitoba–Ontario boundary. The portion of Highway 1 in the Lower Mainland is the second-busiest freeway in Canada, after Toronto's Ontario Highway 401.

The highway's western terminus is in the provincial capital of Victoria, which is also the Trans-Canada Highway's western terminus, where it serves as a city street and freeway in the suburbs. Highway 1 travels north to Nanaimo and reaches the Lower Mainland at Horseshoe Bay via a BC Ferries route across the Strait of Georgia. The highway bypasses Vancouver on a freeway that travels through Burnaby, northern Surrey, and Abbotsford while following the Fraser River inland. The freeway ends in Hope, where Highway 1 turns north to Cache Creek and later east to follow the Fraser and Thompson rivers into the Interior and through Kamloops. The highway continues east across the Columbia Mountains, serving three national parks: Mount Revelstoke, Glacier, and Yoho. Highway 1 enters Alberta and Banff National Park at Kicking Horse Pass, the highest point of the Trans-Canada Highway.

Highway 1 was preceded by several overland trails and wagon roads established in the mid-to-late 19th century, including the Old Yale Road in the Fraser Valley, the Cariboo Road, and the Big Bend Highway. The provincial government designated Highway 1 in 1941 on a portion of the Island Highway between Victoria and Kelsey Bay as well as the Vancouver–Banff highway. It was incorporated into the national Trans-Canada Highway program, which was established in 1949 and completed in 1962. Other sections of the highway were realigned in later years, including a new freeway in the Lower Mainland that opened in the 1960s and 1970s and was numbered Highway 401.

== Vancouver Island section ==
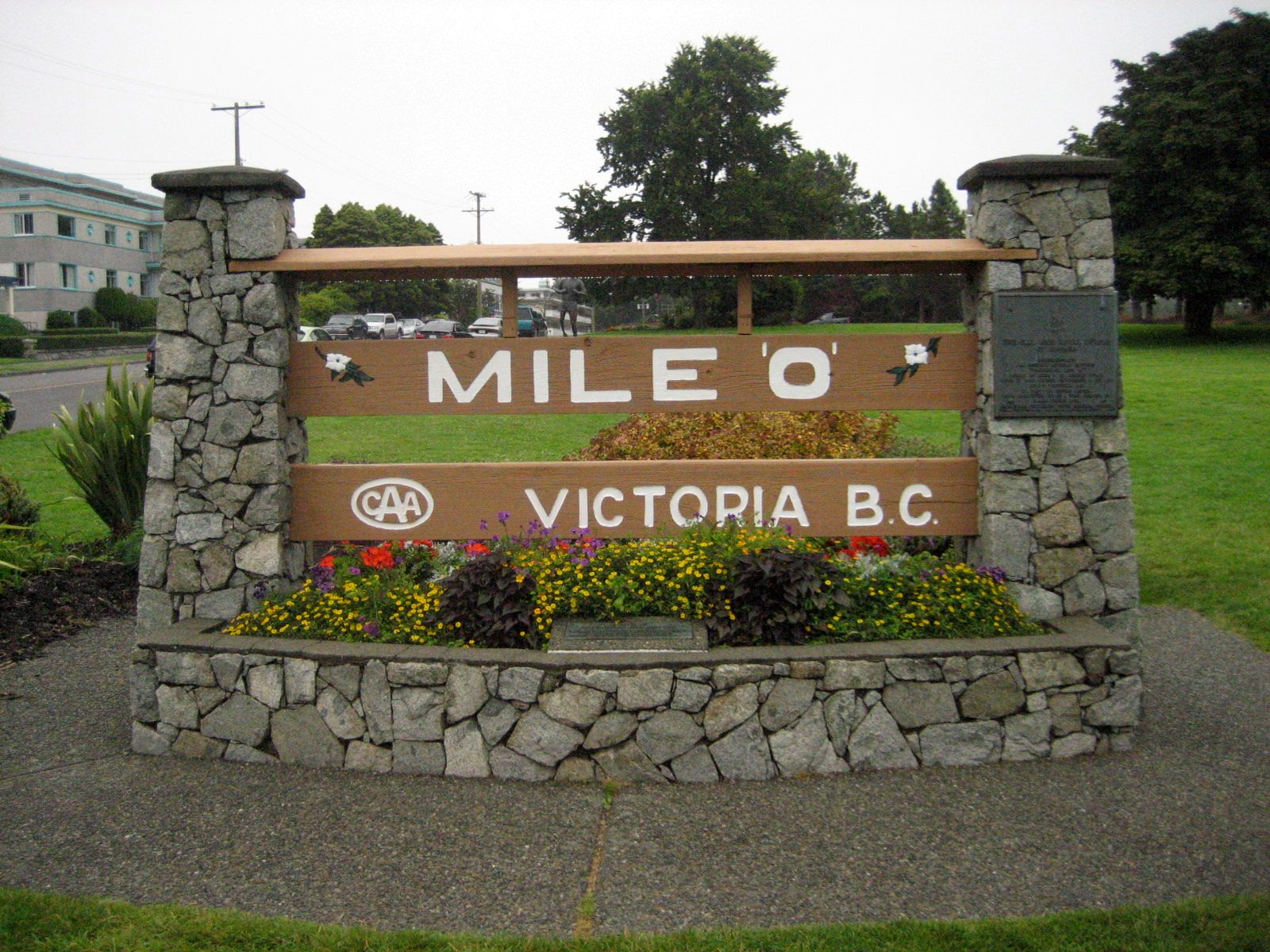
The beginning of Hwy 1 at the Mile Zero monument in Victoria

The western terminus of Highway 1 and the 7,821-kilometre-long (4,860 mi) main route of the Trans-Canada Highway (TCH) is at Dallas Road on the southern coast of Victoria, which faces the Strait of Juan de Fuca. The terminus is marked by the Mile Zero Monument, a wooden sign at the foot of Beacon Hill Park, with a nearby statue of runner Terry Fox to commemorate his cross-country marathon that was planned to end at the monument. The highway travels north on Douglas Street and forms the boundary between the residential James Bay neighbourhood to the west and Beacon Hill Park to the east. At the northwest edge of the park, Blanshard Street, which later carries Highway 17, splits off from the highway to run a block east, staying parallel to Douglas Street. Highway 1 passes the Royal BC Museum and intersects Belleville Street, a short connector that carries a section of Highway 17 from the Black Ball Ferries terminal (which is used by the MV Coho to Port Angeles, Washington) and passes the British Columbia Parliament Buildings.

The highway travels through Downtown Victoria and passes several city landmarks, including the Fairmont Empress Hotel, the Bay Centre, Chinatown, and Mayfair Shopping Centre. It follows Douglas Street, a six-lane urban thoroughfare with bus lanes during peak periods, and continues north into the suburban municipality of Saanich. Near the Uptown shopping centre, Highway 1 turns west and becomes a limited-access road that travels alongside the Galloping Goose Regional Trail through residential areas and along the north side of Portage Inlet. The highway becomes a full freeway with four-to-six lanes as it enters the town of View Royal and travels around the north side of Mill Hill Regional Park. It then intersects Highway 14 in Langford and reverts to a limited-access road with a median divider. Highway 1 (part of the Island Highway) then travels around Bear Mountain and turns north to follow the Goldstream River into Goldstream Provincial Park, where it meets several trailheads.

The Island Highway continues along the west side of the Saanich Inlet and enters the Cowichan Valley Regional District near Malahat. It descends from Malahat Summit, at 352 metres (1,155 ft) above sea level, on a highway with passing lanes and a median barrier added in the late 2010s in response to a high rate of collisions. The section also has occasional closures, relying on the limited-capacity Mill Bay-Brentwood Bay Ferry or the longer Pacific Marine Circle Route as alternate connections between Greater Victoria and other Vancouver Island communities. Highway 1 passes the Malahat SkyWalk, an observation built by the Malahat First Nation, and through farmland surrounding Mill Bay. The highway travels around central Duncan and through North Cowichan and Ladysmith as it continues north as a divided highway with limited access at signalized intersections. In southern Nanaimo, it has a short concurrency with Highway 19, which continues east to the Duke Point ferry terminal and northwest along the Strait of Georgia. Highway 1 travels through central Nanaimo on Nicol Street and Stewart Avenue to the Departure Bay ferry terminal, where the Vancouver Island section of the highway ends. BC Ferries operates an automobile ferry service from Departure Bay to Horseshoe Bay that carries Highway 1 to Metro Vancouver, the Lower Mainland region of British Columbia, and the Canadian mainland. A typical vessel assigned to the route can carry 1,460 to 1,571 passengers and 310 to 322 vehicles.

=== History ===
The Vancouver Island section of Highway 1 was designated in the initial numbering scheme announced by the provincial government in March 1940, along with Highway 1A. It originally connected Victoria to Kelsey Bay, a small coastal community north of Campbell River. The Vancouver Island section was truncated to downtown Nanaimo in 1953, with the section north of Nanaimo being re-numbered to Highway 19. When BC Ferries took over the ferry route between Departure Bay in Nanaimo and Horseshoe Bay in West Vancouver in 1961, Highway 1 was extended to the Departure Bay ferry terminal.

The Malahat Highway was completed in 1911 as a gravel road with a single lane and was later upgraded to two paved lanes. A bridge across the Finlayson Arm to bypass the section was among 19 options studied in 2007, but were discarded in favour of other solutions that would cost less. In 2019, the provincial government studied the construction of a permanent detour for the Goldstream–Malahat section of Highway 1 and identified several potential routes, but instead decided to move forward with safety improvements to the existing highway. The section was severely damaged by several floods in November 2021, which closed the road for several days and required $15 million in repairs the following year.

== Lower Mainland section ==
Highway 1 through Metro Vancouver and the Fraser Valley, highlighted in red.

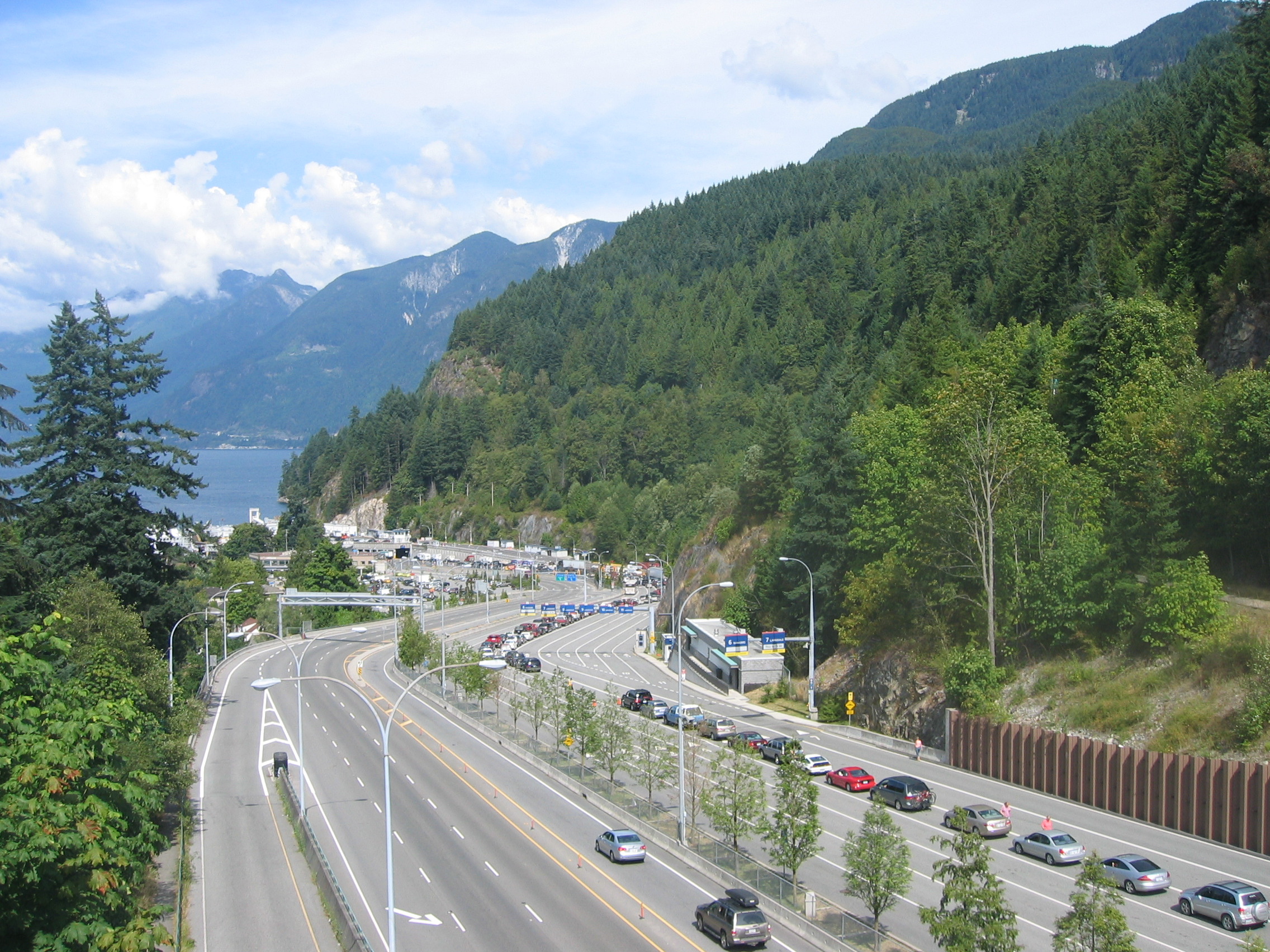
Ferry traffic on Highway 1 at the Horseshoe Bay Ferry Terminal (2006)

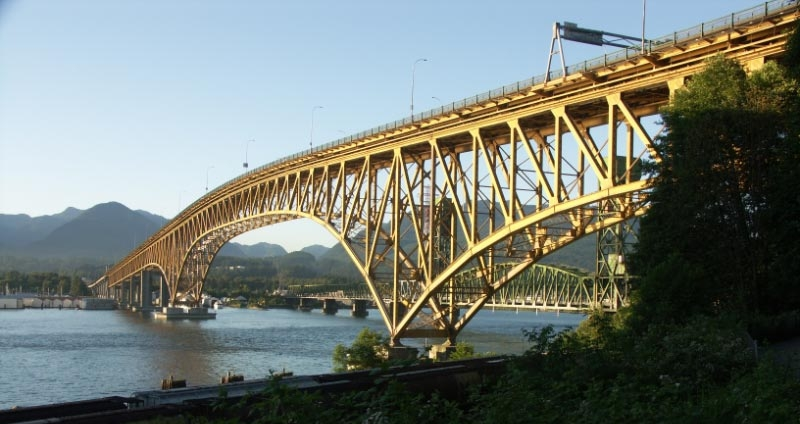
Ironworkers Memorial Second Narrows Crossing (2008)

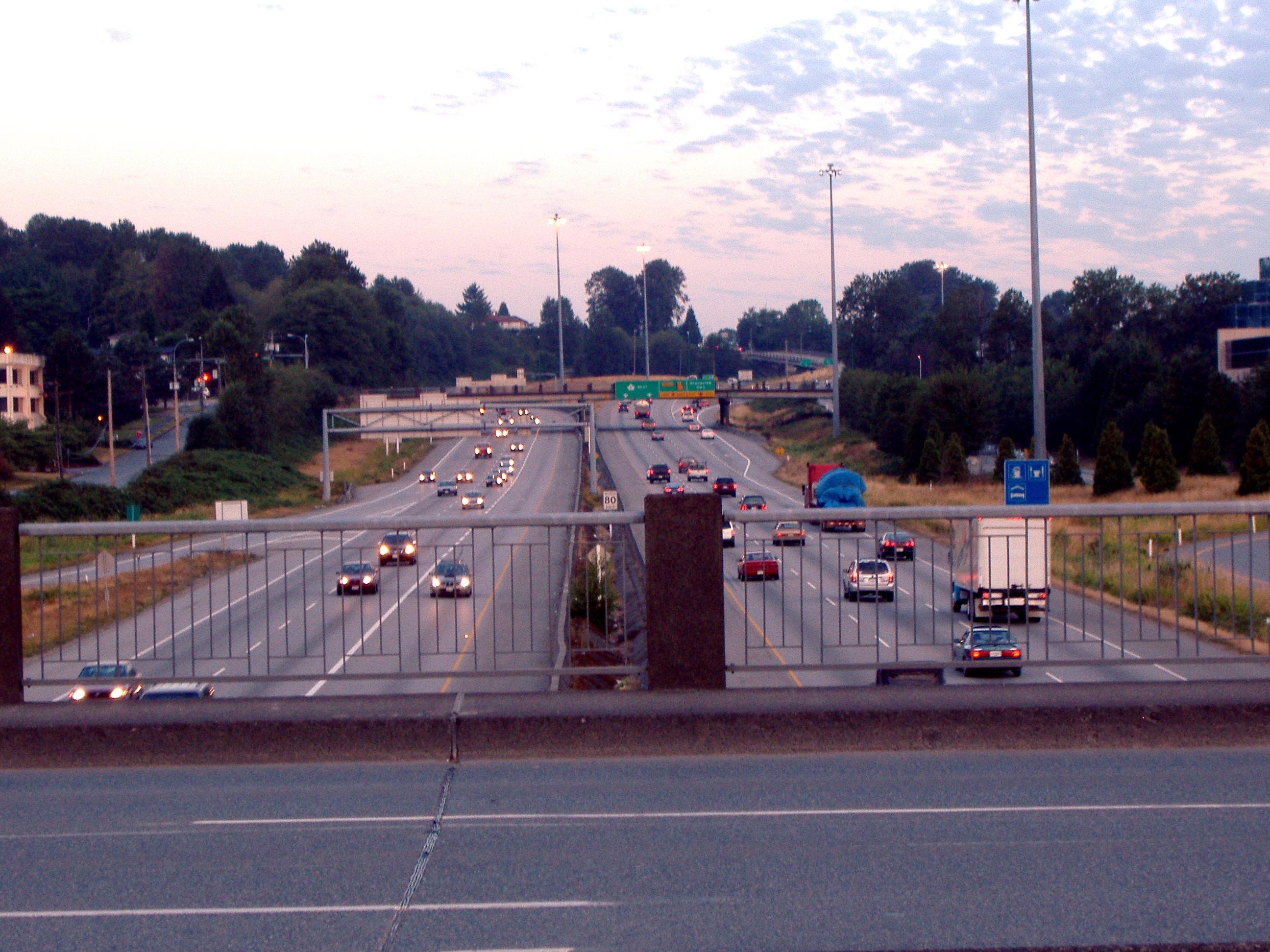
Highway 1 as it enters Vancouver from Burnaby (2006)

=== Route details ===
Sections of Highway 1 from Grandview Highway in Vancouver to 216 Street in Langley vary from being 3 to 4 lanes in each direction, with one of these lanes being a high-occupancy vehicle (HOV) lane. These HOV lanes were constructed in 1998 as part of the BC MOT's "Go Green" project to promote the use of HOV vehicles, and cost $62 million. The highway shortens to two lanes per direction after leaving Langley (Metro Vancouver), and enters Abbotsford (Fraser Valley).

=== History ===
==== North Shore ====
The Upper Levels Highway opened between Horseshoe Bay and Taylor Way in West Vancouver on September 14, 1957, replacing a section of Marine Drive that had carried Highway 1. Construction on a new, high-level Second Narrows Bridge began two months later and was planned to be incorporated into the Trans-Canada Highway upon completion. On June 17, 1958, several spans of the unfinished bridge collapsed during work on the main arch; 18 workers died and one diver also died during a later search at the site. The Second Narrows Bridge was dedicated to the accident's victims and opened to traffic on August 25, 1960; it cost $23 million to construct and was the second-longest bridge in Canada at the time of its completion. The Upper Levels Highway was extended 9.3 kilometres (5.76 mi) east to the Second Narrows Bridge on March 4, 1961; the limited-access highway across North Vancouver cost $50 million to construct.

==== Vancouver to Chilliwack ====
Prior to the opening of the freeway (and prior to the 1980s and 1990s, expressway) segments of the present Trans-Canada, traffic used the Pattullo Bridge, Kingsway, and Fraser Highway as the Trans-Canada Highway. These roads were a part of the Highway 1 from its designation in 1940 until the redesignation of the B.C.'s 400 series highways in 1972/73.

By 1932 a new cutoff across northern parts of the drained Sumas Lake was mostly built. The cutoff bypassed the Yale Road which avoided the historical lake by running on its southern flank and along the base of Vedder Mountain. The highway was initially partly gravel, but it was fully paved within a few years of its opening.

From 1960 to 1964, the province opened several expressway and freeway segments as a part of a continuous express route between Bridal Falls and Taylor Way in West Vancouver.

On August 1, 1960, the Chilliwack Bypass was officially opened by Highways Minister Phil Gaglardi, MLA for Chillwack William Kenneth Kiernan and a six-year-old girl who cut the blue ribbon. About 6.4 km (4 mi) of the road had been opened before Gaglardi officially opened the bypass. Work on the bypass started on December 12, 1956, with two men clearing bushes.

Around the time of opening of the Chilliwack Bypass, a bypass of Abbotsford was also being constructed. That section of freeway was officially opened by Phil Gaglardi on April 19, 1962.

On May 1, 1964, the section of Freeway between what is now north of the 1st Avenue interchange to the Cape Horn Interchange opened. This was followed on June 12 by the opening of the Port Mann bridge, and the official opening of the freeway-expressway system from Bridal Falls to Taylor Way. A 90-year-old man and 11-year-old girl assisted Premier W.A.C. Bennett and Phil Gaglardi in opening the bridge. At the time of the bridge's opening, various speed limits were in effect. The section from Bridal Falls to the Port Mann Bridge had a 70 mph (110 km/h) limit. Through Burnaby, 65 mph (105 km/h) was the limit. Speeds dropped on approach to Cassiar Street with a 50 mph (80 km/h) limit west of Boundary Road, with a drop to 30 mph (48 km/h) for Cassiar Street.

===== New interchanges and upgrades =====
Over the years, various interchanges have been built and rebuilt.

On July 31, 1969, the interchange with Lickman Road in Chilliwack opened. The Prest Road overpass followed in the early 1970s.

The two at-grade intersections of Highway 1 with Westview Drive and Lonsdale Avenue were replaced with interchanges. Lonsdale was replaced in 1991 and Westview was replaced in 1997.

In January 1992 the Cassiar Tunnel opened. The project replaced a surface street section of Cassiar Street which was used by traffic to get from the Burnaby Freeway to the Ironworkers Memorial Bridge.

Through the 2000s and 2010s multiple interchanges were upgraded and rebuilt along the highway. The Gateway program saw the rebuilding of several interchanges from Willingdon Avenue to 176 Street. Through Abbotsford the Mount Lehman/Fraser Highway, Clearbrook Road, and McCallum Road interchanges were rebuilt.

On June 9, 2011, Highway 1 between 152 Street in Surrey and Highway 11 in Abbotsford was designated as the Highway of Heroes.

In 2013, construction reversing the dead end overpass anomaly along with two sectioned off on/off ramps of the Gaglardi Way interchange in Burnaby was completed.

On September 4, 2020, a new interchange with 216 Street was opened.

On November 10, 2022, it was announced that major construction of a new overpass at Glover Road (which will be built first), a revised interchange with Highway 10/232 St. and widening to three lanes between 216 Street and Highway 13/264 St. had started. This work is part of a plan to eventually widen the highway to Whatcom Road in Abbotsford.

== Interior section ==
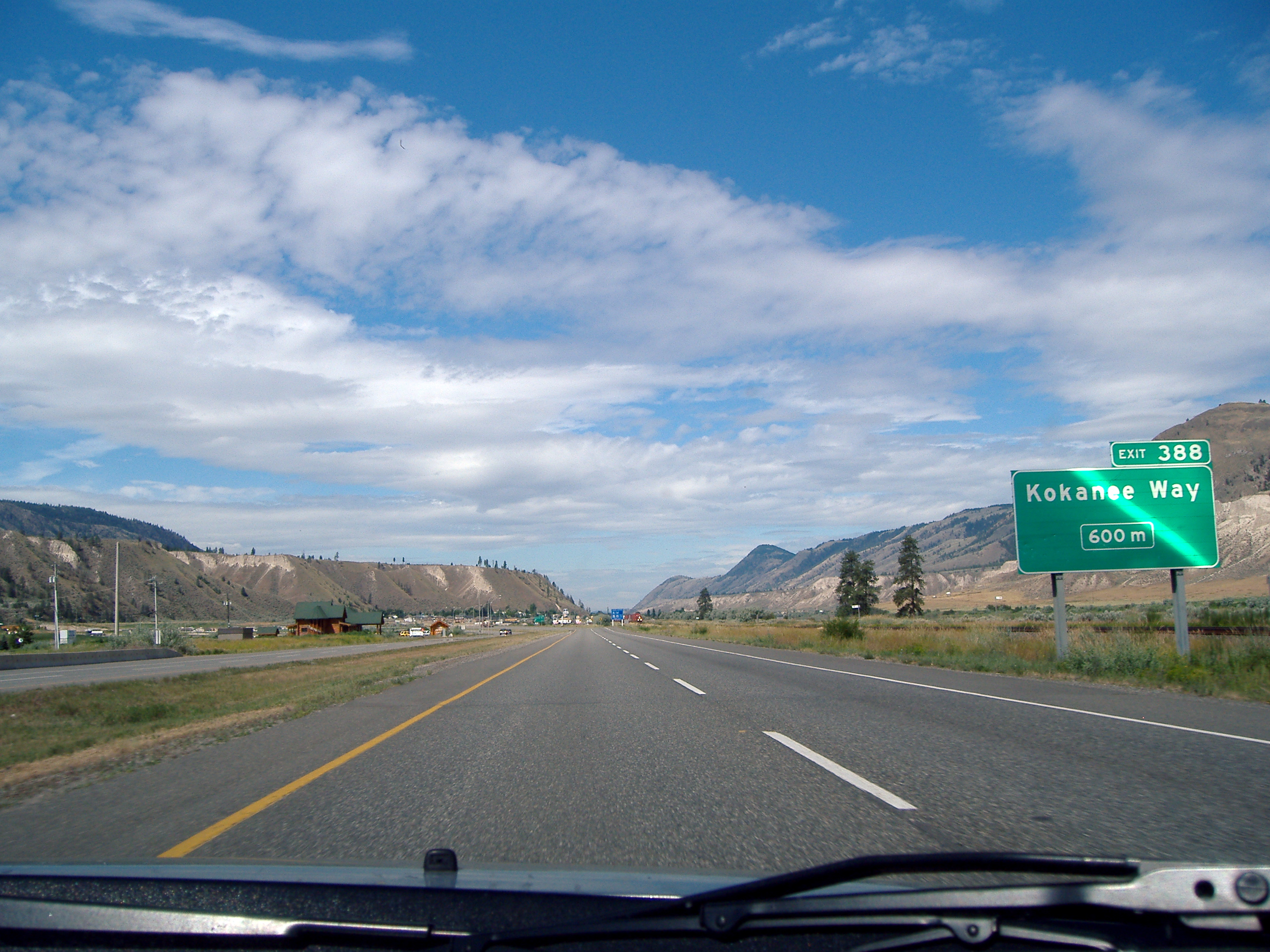
Highway 1 just east of Kamloops heading westbound (2006)

Several sections of Highway 1 between Revelstoke and the Alberta border are under the jurisdiction of Parks Canada.

=== History ===
The first section of the highway to be twinned was the 12-kilometre stretch in 1984–1985 through Malakwa starting 8 kilometres east of Sicamous until Oxbow Road. This remained the only four-lane stretch east of Kamloops until the 2000s.

Since the 2000s, 25 kilometres of road in the Kicking Horse Pass near Golden have been rebuilt in phases to modern standards, with four lanes and the removal of sharp corners. The final phase is due for completion in 2024.

During major floods in November 2021, sections of Highway 1 between Hope and Spences Bridge were washed away into the Thompson River. Other sections of the highway on Vancouver Island and a railroad underpass near Lytton were also damaged in the same event. As a result of the floods, which also damaged other highways in the Fraser Valley, road connections from Metro Vancouver to the rest of Canada were cut off.

=== Future ===
The Interior section of Highway 1 is considered sub-standard when compared to other highways with similar traffic volume in the U.S. or other parts of Canada. The majority of the route is a dangerous, undivided two-lane highway with sharp corners, prone to frequent closures and accidents. To address this, the Ministry of Transportation and Infrastructure has undertaken an effort to twin the highway to four-lane 100 km/h standards between Kamloops and Alberta, with a targeted completion date of 2050. Several stretches of four-lane divided highway, including the Monte Creek to Pritchard section; the four-lane portions of the Kicking Horse Canyon, the 13 km-long passing lanes near Blind Bay, and many smaller four-lane divided fragments typically 2–4 km in length, are the results of this effort. As of 2020, about 25 percent of the highway between Alberta and Kamloops has been upgraded to a divided four-lane cross-section. Several new projects have been funded and are expected to the constructed by 2023, including:

- A new 4.9 km-long four-lane divided section around Chase, involving the construction of an interchange at the town;
- A new interchange and twinned highway at the West entrance of Salmon Arm;
- A new four-lane bridge across the Shuswap River in Sicamous;
- A new rest area and a 2 km-long four-lane section in the Illecillewaet Valley;
- A 4.4 km-long twinning near Quartz Creek east of Golden;
- And upgrading the remaining 4 km-long stretch of two-lane highway in the Kicking Horse Canyon.

== Major intersections ==
Regional District	Location	km	mi	Exit	Destinations	Notes
Capital	Victoria	0.00	0.00		Dallas Road	Western terminus and mile zero of Trans-Canada Highway; south end of Douglas Street
Capital	Victoria	1.20	0.75		Blanshard Street (Highway 17) – Sidney, Airport (YYJ), Ferries	Northbound right-in/right-out; BC Ferries to Vancouver (Tsawwassen) and Gulf Islands
Capital	Victoria	1.30	0.81		Highway 17 (Belleville Street) – Ferries	Black Ball Ferries to Port Angeles; Victoria Clipper passenger ferry to Seattle
Capital	Victoria	2.10	1.30		Johnson Street	One-way pair; access to Johnson Street Bridge
Capital	Victoria	2.20	1.37		Pandora Avenue	One-way pair; access to Johnson Street Bridge
Capital	Victoria	3.10	1.93		Bay Street	
Capital	Victoria	3.40	2.11		Gorge Road / Hillside Avenue / Government Street	Former Highway 1A north
Capital	Victoria–Saanich line	4.50	2.80		Tolmie Avenue	North end of City of Victoria jurisdiction
Capital	Saanich	5.10	3.17		Saanich Road / Boleskine Road	North end of Douglas Street
Capital	Saanich	6.44	4.00		Tillicum Road	At-grade intersection, signalized; south end of freeway
Capital	Saanich	6.79	4.22	—	Burnside Road / Interurban Road	Southbound exit only
Capital	Saanich	7.52	4.67	6	McKenzie Avenue (Highway 902:0313 east) to Highway 17 / Admirals Road – Sidney, Airport, Ferries	McKenzie Avenue Interchange
Capital	View Royal	9.59	5.96	8	Helmcken Road	Helmcken Road Interchange
Capital	View Royal	11.30	7.02	10	Colwood (Island Highway, Burnside Road)	Colwood Interchange; northbound exit and southbound entrance; former Highway 1A south
Capital	View Royal	12.24	7.61	11	Colwood (Six Mile Road)	Thetis Interchange; southbound exit and northbound entrance
Capital	Langford	15.29	9.50	14	Highway 14 west (Veterans Memorial Parkway) / Millstream Road – Langford, Highlands, Sooke	Millstream Road Interchange
Capital	Langford	15.94	9.90	15	McCallum Road	Northbound exit only
Capital	Langford	16.77	10.42	16	Leigh Road / Bear Mountain Parkway	Bear Mountain Interchange
Capital	Langford	18.29	11.36		Westshore Parkway	At-grade, signalized; north end of freeway
Cowichan Valley		37.88	23.54	—	Mill Bay Road – Ferry, Brentwood Bay	Bamberton Interchange
Cowichan Valley	Mill Bay	43.93	27.30		Deloume Road (Highway 902:2401 east) – Brentwood Ferry	
Cowichan Valley	Duncan	62.35	38.74		Trunk Road – City Centre, Maple Bay	To Highway 902:0363
Cowichan Valley	North Cowichan	67.24	41.78		Highway 18 west / Herd Road – Lake Cowichan	
Cowichan Valley	North Cowichan	74.04	46.01		Mount Sicker Road (Highway 1A north)	
Cowichan Valley	North Cowichan	78.42	48.73		Henry Road – Chemainus, Thetis Island, Penelakut Island, Salt Spring Island	
Cowichan Valley	Ladysmith	88.19	54.80		Chemainus Road (Highway 1A south) / Davis Road – Chemainus, Thetis Island, Penelakut Island	
Nanaimo	Cassidy	98.98	61.50		Spitfire Way – Airport (YCD)	
Nanaimo		101.38	62.99	—	Nanaimo River Road / Fry Road	Nanaimo River Road Interchange
Nanaimo	Nanaimo	105.75	65.71	7 (Note: BC 19 exit number; southbound only)	Highway 19 east – Duke Point ferry terminal	Duke Point Interchange; south end of Highway 19 concurrency; BC Ferries to Vancouver (Tsawwassen)
Nanaimo	Nanaimo	107.69	66.92	9 (Note: BC 19 exit number; northbound only)	Highway 19 north (Nanaimo Parkway) / Cedar Road – Parksville, Campbell River	North end of Highway 19 concurrency; partial-at grade intersection with northbound flyover to Highway 19 north
Nanaimo	Nanaimo	112.35	69.81		Front Street – Gabriola Island	
Nanaimo	Nanaimo	113.61	70.59		Terminal Avenue to Highway 19A north – Parksville, Campbell River	Highway 1 follows Stewart Avenue
Nanaimo	Nanaimo	115.67	71.87		Highway 19A north (Brechin Road) – Parksville	
Nanaimo	Nanaimo	115.67	71.87	Departure Bay ferry terminal		
Strait of Georgia				BC Ferries from Departure Bay to Horseshoe Bay		
Metro Vancouver	West Vancouver	0.00	0.00		To Highway 101 north – Gibsons, Powell River	Access via BC ferries; westbound access only
Metro Vancouver	West Vancouver	0.00	0.00	Horseshoe Bay ferry terminal		
Metro Vancouver	West Vancouver	0.61	0.38	0	Marine Drive	Horseshoe Bay Interchange; eastbound exit only; to Horseshoe Bay Drive (Highway 901:2924)
Metro Vancouver	West Vancouver	1.84	1.14	2	Marine Drive / Eagleridge Drive (Highway 901:0513 north)	Squamish Interchange; westbound exit only; eastbound access to Highway 99; westbound access via Highway 99
Metro Vancouver	West Vancouver	2.21	1.37	3	Highway 99 north (Sea to Sky Highway) – Squamish, Whistler	Eagle Ridge Interchange; westbound exit and eastbound entrance; west end of Highway 99 concurrency; westbound Highway 1 uses exit 3
Metro Vancouver	West Vancouver	4.29	2.67	4	Woodgreen Drive / Headland Drive	
Metro Vancouver	West Vancouver	6.95	4.32	7	Wentworth Avenue / Westmount Road	
Metro Vancouver	West Vancouver	8.54	5.31	8	Cypress Bowl Road	To Cypress Mountain Ski Area
Metro Vancouver	West Vancouver	9.94	6.18	10	22nd Street	Eastbound exit only
Metro Vancouver	West Vancouver	10.59	6.58	10	21st Street / Westhill Drive	No eastbound exit
Metro Vancouver	West Vancouver	11.46	7.12	11	15th Street	
Metro Vancouver	West Vancouver	13.15	8.17	13	Highway 99 south (Taylor Way) – Vancouver, Airport	East end of Highway 99 concurrency; former Highway 1A east; to Lions Gate Bridge and Downtown Vancouver
Metro Vancouver	North Vancouver (District)	14.59	9.07	14	Capilano Road	To Grouse Mountain
Metro Vancouver	North Vancouver (District)	15.51	9.64	15	Lloyd Avenue	Westbound right-in/right-out
Metro Vancouver	North Vancouver (City)	16.75	10.41	17	Westview Drive	
Metro Vancouver	North Vancouver (City)	17.92	11.13	18	Lonsdale Avenue	
Metro Vancouver	North Vancouver (District)	19.40	12.05	19	Lynn Valley Road	
Metro Vancouver	North Vancouver (District)	21.37	13.28	21	Mountain Highway	Signed as exit 22A for Highway 1 west exiting before Lynn Creek Bridge
Metro Vancouver	North Vancouver (District)	22.17	13.78	22	Mount Seymour Parkway / Lillooet Road	
Metro Vancouver	North Vancouver (District)	22.88	14.22	23	Main Street / Dollarton Highway	Signed as exits 23A (Main Street) and 23B (Dollarton Highway) from Highway 1 west
Metro Vancouver	North Vancouver (District)–Vancouver line	23.09– 24.42	14.35– 15.17	Ironworkers Memorial Second Narrows Crossing over Burrard Inlet		
Metro Vancouver	Vancouver	25.03	15.55	25	McGill Street	
Metro Vancouver	Vancouver	25.03	15.55	26	Hastings Street	Eastbound exit and westbound entrance to Cassiar Connector (Highway 901:2545 south); formerly Highway 7A
Metro Vancouver	Vancouver	25.39– 26.13	15.78– 16.24	Cassiar Tunnel		
Metro Vancouver	Vancouver	26.32	16.35	26	Hastings Street	Westbound exit and eastbound entrance to Cassiar Connector (Highway 901:2546 north); formerly Highway 7A
Metro Vancouver	Vancouver	27.06	16.81	27	1st Avenue / Rupert Street	
Metro Vancouver	Vancouver–Burnaby line	28.02	17.41	28	Boundary Road	Eastbound to southbound exit; northbound to westbound entrance
Metro Vancouver	Burnaby	28.44	17.67	28A	Grandview Highway	Westbound exit and eastbound entrance
Metro Vancouver	Burnaby	28.44	17.67	28B	Grandview Highway	HOV-only interchange (left exit/entrance), westbound exit and eastbound entrance
Metro Vancouver	Burnaby	28.44	17.67	West end of HOV lanes		
Metro Vancouver	Burnaby	29.64	18.42	29	Willingdon Avenue	
Metro Vancouver	Burnaby	32.26	20.05	32	Sprott Street	Eastbound exit and westbound entrance
Metro Vancouver	Burnaby	33.11	20.57	33	Kensington Avenue / Canada Way	No eastbound to northbound exit
Metro Vancouver	Burnaby	37.38	23.23	37	Gaglardi Way	To Simon Fraser University
Metro Vancouver	Burnaby	39.11	24.30	38	Government Street	Transit-only interchange (left exit/entrance); westbound exit and eastbound entrance
Metro Vancouver	Coquitlam	40.55	25.20	40	Brunette Avenue	To New Westminster and Pattullo Bridge
Metro Vancouver	Coquitlam	43.68	27.14	44	Highway 7 (Lougheed Highway) – Burnaby, Coquitlam City Centre	Cape Horn Interchange
Metro Vancouver	Coquitlam	43.68	27.14	44	Highway 7B east (Mary Hill Bypass) / United Boulevard – Maple Ridge	Eastbound exit and westbound entrance; westbound exit via Highway 7 east
Metro Vancouver	Fraser River	44.89– 46.91	27.89– 29.15	Port Mann Bridge		
Metro Vancouver	Surrey	48.26	29.99	48	152 Street – Surrey City Centre	Eastbound exit and westbound entrance; west end of Highway of Heroes
Metro Vancouver	Surrey	49.18	30.56	49	156 Street	HOV-only interchange (left exit)
Metro Vancouver	Surrey	50.10	31.13	50	104 Avenue / 160 Street – Surrey City Centre	Former toll centre for Port Mann Bridge
Metro Vancouver	Surrey	53.47	33.22	53	Highway 15 south (176 Street) – USA Border; Highway 17 west (South Fraser Perimeter Road) – Delta, Airport (YVR), Ferries	BC Ferries to Victoria (Swartz Bay) and Nanaimo (Duke Point)
Metro Vancouver	Surrey	56.79	35.29	57	192 Street north – Golden Ears Bridge	Eastbound to northbound exit and southbound to westbound entrance
Metro Vancouver	Langley (Township)	58.62	36.42	58	200 Street – Langley City Centre, Golden Ears Bridge	
Metro Vancouver	Langley (Township)	59.32	36.86	59	202 Street	HOV-only interchange (left exit)
Metro Vancouver	Langley (Township)	62.12	38.60	61	216 Street	To Trinity Western University. Opened in September 2020.
Metro Vancouver	Langley (Township)			East end of HOV lanes		
Metro Vancouver	Langley (Township)	65.73	40.84	66	Highway 10 west (232 Street) – Langley (city), Fort Langley	
Metro Vancouver	Langley (Township)	73.25	45.52	73	Highway 13 south (264 Street) – Aldergrove, USA Border	
Fraser Valley	Abbotsford	82.89	51.51	83	Fraser Highway / Mount Lehman Road – Airport (YXX)	Formerly Highway 1A west
Fraser Valley	Abbotsford	86.65	53.84	87	Clearbrook Road	
Fraser Valley	Abbotsford	90.21	56.05	90	McCallum Road	
Fraser Valley	Abbotsford	92.96	57.76	92	Highway 11 (Sumas Way) – Mission, USA Border	Closest the Trans-Canada Highway gets to the US border in Western Canada; east end of Highway of Heroes
Fraser Valley	Abbotsford	95.51	59.35	95	Whatcom Road	
Fraser Valley	Abbotsford	98.98	61.50	99	Cole Road / South Parallel Road	Eastbound only, road names unsigned
Fraser Valley	Abbotsford	104.52	64.95	104	No 3 Road – Yarrow, Cultus Lake	
Fraser Valley	Chilliwack	110.16	68.45	109	Yale Road West	
Fraser Valley	Chilliwack	116.05	72.11	116	Lickman Road	
Fraser Valley	Chilliwack	118.19	73.44	118	Evans Road	Eastbound exit and westbound entrance
Fraser Valley	Chilliwack	119.36	74.17	119	Yale Road / Vedder Road – City Centre	Sardis Interchange; formerly Highway 1A east; to Columbia Valley Highway (Highway 901:0691)
Fraser Valley	Chilliwack	120.53	74.89	120	Young Road	Westbound exit and eastbound entrance
Fraser Valley	Chilliwack	122.79	76.30	123	Prest Road	
Fraser Valley	Chilliwack	129.21	80.29	129	Annis Road	
Fraser Valley		135.29	84.07	135	Highway 9 north – Agassiz, Harrison Hot Springs	
Fraser Valley		138.07	85.79	138	Popkum Road – Popkum, Bridal Falls	
Fraser Valley		146.35	90.94	146	Herrling Island	
Fraser Valley		151.54	94.16	151	Peters Road	
Fraser Valley		153.72	95.52	153	Laidlaw Road – Jones Lake	
Fraser Valley	Hope	160.09	99.48	160	Hunter Creek Road / St. Elmo Road	
Fraser Valley	Hope	164.76	102.38	165	Flood-Hope Road – Hope Business Route	
Fraser Valley	Hope	167.98	104.38	168	Flood-Hope Road	
Fraser Valley	Hope	170.36	105.86	170	Highway 3 east (Crowsnest Highway) – Princeton, Penticton; To Highway 5 north (Coquihalla Highway) – Merritt, Kamloops	Highway 1 exits freeway and branches north; exit numbers continue along Highway 3 to Highway 5; eastbound exit and westbound entrance
Fraser Valley	Hope	171.05	106.29		Old Hope-Princeton Way (Highway 901:0694 east) / Highway 3 east / Highway 5 north – Princeton, Merritt	Westbound (southbound) access to Highway 3 / Highway 5
Fraser Valley	Hope	172.87	107.42	Water Avenue Bridge across the Fraser River		
Fraser Valley	Hope	174.26	108.28		Highway 7 west (Lougheed Highway) – Mission, Maple Ridge	Haig interchange
Fraser Valley		196.72	122.24	Yale Tunnel		
Fraser Valley		200.70	124.71	Saddle Rock Tunnel		
Fraser Valley		206.96	128.60	Sailor Bar Tunnel		
Fraser Valley		214.89	133.53	Alexandra Bridge across the Fraser River		
Fraser Valley		218.90	136.02	Alexandra Tunnel		
Fraser Valley		223.58	138.93	Hell's Gate Tunnel		
Fraser Valley		223.90	139.13	Ferrabee Tunnel		
Fraser Valley		228.74	142.13	China Bar Tunnel		
Fraser Valley	Boston Bar	236.17	146.75		Boston Bar Station Road – North Bend	
Thompson-Nicola	Lytton	279.51	173.68		Highway 12 north – Lillooet	
Thompson-Nicola	Spences Bridge	315.11	195.80		Highway 8 east – Merritt	
Thompson-Nicola	Spences Bridge	315.68	196.15	Spences New Bridge across the Thompson River		
Thompson-Nicola		354.17	220.07		Cornwall Road (Highway 907:0901 north) to Highway 97C south – Ashcroft	
Thompson-Nicola	Boston Flats	360.17	223.80		Highway 97C south – Ashcroft, Logan Lake, Merritt	West end of Highway 97C concurrency (unsigned)
Thompson-Nicola	Cache Creek	364.35	226.40		Highway 97 north (Cariboo Highway) / Highway 97C ends – Prince George	Highway 1 branches east; east end of Highway 97C concurrency (unsigned); west end of Highway 97 concurrency
Thompson-Nicola	Savona	400.38	248.78	Savona Bridge (Kamloops Lake Bridge) across the Thompson River		
Thompson-Nicola	Kamloops	436.34	271.13	362	Highway 5 south (Coquihalla Highway) – Merritt, Kelowna, Hope, Vancouver	West end of Highway 5 concurrency; Highway 1 / Highway 97 enters freeway; exit numbers continue from Highway 5
Thompson-Nicola	Kamloops	440.57	273.76	366	Copperhead Drive / Lac le Jeune Road	Copperhead interchange; to Highway 906:0923 south
Thompson-Nicola	Kamloops	442.25	274.80	367	Pacific Way	Pacific Way interchange
Thompson-Nicola	Kamloops	443.04	275.29	368	Highway 5A south / Hillside Way	Aberdeen Interchange
Thompson-Nicola	Kamloops	444.34	276.10	369	Columbia Street – City Centre	Sagebrush Interchange; eastbound exit and westbound entrance
Thompson-Nicola	Kamloops	444.92	276.46	370	Summit Drive – City Centre	Springhill Interchange; westbound exit and eastbound entrance
Thompson-Nicola	Kamloops	448.41	278.63	374	Highway 5 (YH) north – Sun Peaks, Jasper	Yellowhead Interchange; east end of Highway 5 concurrency
Thompson-Nicola	Kamloops	448.86	278.91	375	Battle Street – City Centre	Valleyview Interchange; no eastbound exit; east end of freeway
Thompson-Nicola	Kamloops	Gap in freeway; 6 signalized intersections				
Thompson-Nicola	Kamloops	457.49	284.27	384	Kipp Road / Dallas Drive / Barnhartvale Road	Interchange
Thompson-Nicola	Kamloops	462.14	287.16	386 (Note: Eastbound exit number); 388 (Note: Westbound exit number)	Kokanee Way	O'Connor Interchange
Thompson-Nicola	Kamloops	465.83	289.45	390; 391	Lafarge Road	Interchange
Thompson-Nicola		471.86	293.20	396; 397	Hook Road	Interchange; westbound access to Highway 97 south (U-turn)
Thompson-Nicola		474.41	294.78	399	Highway 97 south – Vernon	Monte Creek Interchange; east end of Highway 97 concurrency; no westbound exit; becomes limited-access road
Thompson-Nicola		485.72	301.81	411	Pinantan-Pritchard Road (Highway 906:1778 west) / Stoney Flats Road – Pritchard	Interchange
Thompson-Nicola		499.48	310.36		Shuswap-Chase Creek Road (Highway 905:1294 south)	
Thompson-Nicola	Chase	502.60	312.30	428	Brooke Drive	Interchange
Columbia-Shuswap		513.21	318.89		Squilax-Anglemont Road (Highway 905:0944 north) – Adams Lake, Scotch Creek, Anglemont	Partially grade separated
Columbia-Shuswap	Sorrento	522.30	324.54		Notch Hill Road	
Columbia-Shuswap	Blind Bay	528.22	328.22	—	Golf Course Drive / Cedar Drive	Interchange
Columbia-Shuswap		534.04	331.84		Broderick Creek Frontage Road / White Creek Frontage Road	Grade separated; right-in/right-out
Columbia-Shuswap		535.60	332.81		Broderick Creek Frontage Road / Carlin Road / White Lake Road	Grade separated; right-in/right-out
Columbia-Shuswap	Tappen	540.21	335.67	465	Sunnybrae-Canoe Point Road	Interchange
Columbia-Shuswap	Salmon Arm	551.77	342.85	478	10th Avenue SW / First Nations Road / 42nd Street SW	Interchange; to Highway 905:1127
Columbia-Shuswap	Salmon Arm	557.49	346.41	—	21st Street NE	Eastbound exit and entrance
Columbia-Shuswap	Salmon Arm	557.92	346.68	—	11th Avenue NE	Westbound exit and entrance
Columbia-Shuswap	Salmon Arm	559.84	347.87		Highway 97B south – Vernon	
Columbia-Shuswap	Sicamous	585.11	363.57		Old Sicamous Road / Old Spallumcheen Road	Interchange under construction
Columbia-Shuswap	Sicamous	586.68	364.55		Highway 97A south – Vernon	
Columbia-Shuswap	Revelstoke	656.38	407.86		Highway 23 south – Galena Bay, Nakusp	West end of Highway 23 concurrency
Columbia-Shuswap	Revelstoke	656.93	408.20	Revelstoke Bridge across the Columbia River		
Columbia-Shuswap	Revelstoke	657.39	408.48		Victoria Road – City Centre	To Revelstoke Mountain Resort ski area
Columbia-Shuswap	Revelstoke	657.82	408.75		Highway 23 north – Mica Creek	East end Highway 23 concurrency; to Revelstoke Dam
Columbia-Shuswap	Mount Revelstoke National Park	658.73	409.32	—	Meadows-in-the-Sky Parkway	Interchange
Columbia-Shuswap		703.17	436.93	Jack MacDonald Snowshed		
Columbia-Shuswap		704.02	437.46	Twins Snowshed		
Columbia-Shuswap		704.78	437.93	Lanark Snowshed		
Columbia-Shuswap	Glacier National Park	725.27	450.66	Rogers Pass – 1,330 m (4,360 ft)		
Columbia-Shuswap	Glacier National Park	729.56	453.33	Bench Snowshed		
Columbia-Shuswap	Glacier National Park	730.46	453.89	Len's Snowshed		
Columbia-Shuswap	Glacier National Park	730.96	454.20	Tupper #1 Snowshed		
Columbia-Shuswap	Glacier National Park	731.75	454.69	Tupper #2 Snowshed		
Columbia-Shuswap	Glacier National Park	732.33	455.05	Tupper Timber Snowshed		
Columbia-Shuswap	Donald	779.63	484.44	Donald Bridge across the Columbia River		
Columbia-Shuswap	Golden	806.13	500.91		Highway 95 south – Radium Hot Springs, Cranbrook	To Kicking Horse Resort ski area
Columbia-Shuswap	Golden	807.53	501.78	780	Golden View Road / Golden Donald Upper Road / Lafontaine Road	Interchange
Columbia-Shuswap		818.44	508.56	Park Bridge across the Kicking Horse River		
Columbia-Shuswap		830.22	515.87	—	Wapta Road / Beaverfoot Road	Grade separated; right-in/right-out
Columbia-Shuswap	Field	860.09	534.44		Field Access Road	
Columbia-Shuswap	Yoho National Park	873.42	542.72		Lake O'Hara Road	Former Highway 1A east
Columbia-Shuswap	Yoho National Park	877.29	545.12	Kicking Horse Pass – 1,627 m (5,338 ft)		
Columbia-Shuswap	Yoho National Park	877.29	545.12		Highway 1 (TCH) east – Banff, Calgary	Continental Divide; continues into Alberta and Banff National Park
1.000 mi = 1.609 km; 1.000 km = 0.621 mi: Concurrency terminus; HOV only; Incomplete access; Tolled; Route transition; Unopened

== See also ==
- List of British Columbia provincial highways - A list of highways in BC, Canada.

Trans-Canada Highway
Previous route Terminus	Highway 1	Next route AB Highway 1
