= Guichon Creek (Nicola River tributary) =

River in British Columbia, Canada

Coordinates: 50°09′N 120°53′W

Guichon Creek is a large creek in the Nicola Country of southern interior British Columbia. It flows south from near Mount Fehr (south of Walhachin) past Logan Lake through Mamit Lake, entering the Nicola River at Lower Nicola west of Merritt.

The creek provides irrigation water for nearby cattle ranches, and a tributary, Witches Brook, drains part of the area of the Highland Valley Copper mine. Highway 97C runs parallel to the creek between Logan Lake and its junction with Highway 8.
