= British Columbia Highway 5A =

Highway in British Columbia

Highway 5A
- Princeton-Merritt Highway; Merritt-Kamloops Highway

Route information
- Auxiliary route of Highway 5
- Maintained by the Ministry of Transportation and Infrastructure
- Length: 182 km (113 mi)
- Existed: 1986–present

Major junctions
- South end: Highway 3 in Princeton
- Highway 97C from Aspen Grove to Merritt; Highway 5 (YH) / Highway 8 in Merritt
- North end: Highway 1 (TCH) / Highway 5 (YH) / Highway 97 in Kamloops

Location
- Country: Canada
- Province: British Columbia
- Major cities: Merritt, Kamloops
- Towns: Princeton

Highway system
- British Columbia provincial highways
← Highway 5	→ Highway 6

Highway 5A is Highway 5's pre-1986 alignment south of Kamloops. Unlike the main route, a section of BC Highway 5 known as the Coquihalla, which is a twinned highway consisting of at least 4 lanes at any given point, the 182 km (113 mi) long Highway 5A is only two lanes, with one four lane section between Highway 5 and Highway 97C (known as the Okanagan Connector), lasting along BC Highway 5A for approximately 23 km (14 mi).

== Route details ==
Starting at the junction of the Crowsnest Highway (Highway 3) in Princeton, Highway 5A goes through 63 km (39 miles) of undeveloped land north to its junction with the Okanagan Connector (Highway 97C) at Aspen Grove. Past Aspen Grove, Highway 5A and Highway 97C travel in a shared designation northwest for 23 km (14 mi) in a four lane alignment before intersecting the Coquihalla Highway 5 and Highway 8 at Merritt. After a 4 km (2.5 miles) gap, Highway 5A continues north northeast for 89 km (55 mi), passing through the community of Quilchena, before terminating within Kamloops at its junction with Highways 5, 1 and 97 (which are overlapped at the point where 5A terminates).

Highway 5A used to circle through Merritt for 7 km (4 mi), following Nicola Street (Highways 8 and 97C) and Voght Street, to its second crossover of Highway 5 in the north area of Merritt; however, it was dropped by the province in 2008. The two segments can be access by either traveling through Merritt or following Highway 5. The city of Merritt has left most 5A signage in place.

Highway 5A is often considered to be a back country highway due to its low traffic volumes and features unusual to highways (e.g. cattle guards). Highway 5A between Aspen Grove and Merritt saw major upgrades in the late 1980s to prepare for the opening of the Okanagan Connector, but still remained two lanes for several years after. When the Okanagan Connector opened on October 1, 1990, the Hamilton Hill section was moved to a new four lane alignment north of the former route which can still be accessed by following a short dirt trail from the traffic light near the Coquihalla and 97c interchange. Controversial plans once called for the Okanagan Connector to continue past Aspen Grove and Highway 5A to meet with Highway 5 south of Merritt. When it became apparent that this extension was unlikely, the highway was four lanes in stages from Aspen Grove to the Hamilton Hill Brake Check. Although upgraded for Okanagan Connector traffic, Highway 5A from Aspen Grove to Merritt is not considered to be a freeway, due to its numerous at-grade intersections and undivided nature. The speed limit on this stretch is 110 km/h, which is 10 km/h lower than both the Okanagan Connector and the Coquihalla Highways.

== Major intersections ==
From south to north:

Regional District	Location	km	mi	Destinations	Notes
Okanagan-Similkameen	Princeton	0.00	0.00	Highway 3 (Crowsnest Highway) – Osoyoos, Vancouver	
Thompson-Nicola	Aspen Grove	62.68	38.95	Highway 97C east (Okanagan Connector) – Kelowna	South end of Highway 97C concurrency
Thompson-Nicola	Merritt	86.22	53.57	Highway 5 (YH) (Coquihalla Highway) – Vancouver, Kamloops Highway 8 begins – Merritt City Centre	Coldwater Interchange; Highway 5 exit 286; Highway 5A officially ends; north end of Highway 97C concurrency; roadway continues as Highway 8 / Highway 97C
Thompson-Nicola	Merritt	90.37	56.15	Highway 8 west / Highway 97C north (Nicola Avenue) / Voght Street – Spences Bridge, Logan Lake, Ashcroft	Former Highway 5A followed Vought Street
Thompson-Nicola	Merritt	93.17	57.89	Highway 5 (YH) (Coquihalla Highway) – Kamloops, Vancouver	Nicola Interchange; Highway 5 exit 290; Highway 5A resumes
Thompson-Nicola	Kamloops	183.10	113.77	Highway 1 (TCH) / Highway 5 (YH) / Highway 97 – Vancouver, City Centre, Salmon Arm	Aberdeen interchange; Highway 1 / Highway 5 exit 368; Highway 5A northern terminus; continues as Hillside Way
1.000 mi = 1.609 km; 1.000 km = 0.621 mi: Closed/former; Concurrency terminus; Route transition
