= British Columbia Highway 8 =

Highway in British Columbia

Highway 8
- Nicola Highway
- Highway 8 highlighted in red

Route information
- Maintained by the Ministry of Transportation and Infrastructure
- Length: 69 km (43 mi)
- Existed: 1953–present

Major junctions
- West end: Highway 1 (TCH) in Spences Bridge
- Highway 97C near Lower Nicola
- East end: Highway 5 (YH) / Highway 5A / Highway 97C in Merritt

Location
- Country: Canada
- Province: British Columbia

Highway system
- British Columbia provincial highways
← Highway 7B	→ Highway 9

Highway 8, known as the Nicola Highway, is an alternate route to Highway 97C between Highway 1 and the Coquihalla Highway (Highway 5) in the Thompson-Nicola Regional District. Highway 8 was first numbered in 1953, and very little about the highway changed between that year and 2021, when large segments of the highway were washed out by floods.

Highway 8 follows the Nicola River for 69 km (43 mi) between Spences Bridge, on Highway 1, to Merritt on Highway 5.

== History ==
Highway 8 is part of the first automobile route built to connect the Lower Mainland to the Alberta border. Named the Southern Trans-Provincial Highway, it ran from Vancouver to Crowsnest Pass and was later designated as Route A; the route followed Kingsway and Yale Road from Vancouver to Hope, then turned north to Spences Bridge. The route then turned southeast and passed through Merritt and Princeton along present-day Highway 8 and Highway 5A before travelling east along present-day Crowsnest Highway (Highway 3) towards Osoyoos, the Kootenays, and the Alberta border. In 1941, British Columbia transitioned from lettered to numbered highways, with the Lower Mainland section of Route A becoming Highway 1 and the remainder becoming Highway 3. After the end of World War II, the provincial government began to upgrade its highway system and constructed new sections of its highways. On November 2, 1949, the Hope-Princeton Highway through Allison Pass and Sunday Summit was opened, reducing the driving distance between Hope and Princeton from approximately 300 km (185 mi) to 135 km (85 mi).

When the Okanagan Connector was constructed between Merritt and Kelowna in the late 1980s, initial proposals had it designated as Highway 8; however, communities on the route preferred it designated as an auxiliary route of Highway 97 and was designated as Highway 97C.

During the major floods in November 2021, large segments of the highway were washed out by the Nicola River. Further washouts occurred during repairs in mid-2022. On September 23, 2022, it was announced that highway had been reconnected for the first time since the washouts, enabling locals to use the highway. The highway subsequently reopened to the general public on November 9, nearly a year after the washouts.

== Major intersections ==
For west to east. The entire route is in Thompson-Nicola Regional District.

Location	km	mi	Destinations	Notes
Spences Bridge	0.00	0.00	Highway 1 (TCH) – Hope, Vancouver, Cache Creek	Highway 8 western terminus
Lower Nicola	60.31	37.47	Highway 97C north – Logan Lake, Ashcroft	West end of Highway 97C concurrency
Merritt	65.17	40.49	Voght Street	Former Highway 5A north; former west end of Highway 5A concurrency
Merritt	69.32	43.07	Highway 5 (YH) (Coquihalla Highway) to Highway 5A north – Kamloops, Hope, Vancouver Highway 5A south / Highway 97C east – Princeton, Kelowna	Coldwater interchange (Highway 5 exit 286); Highway 8 eastern terminus
1.000 mi = 1.609 km; 1.000 km = 0.621 mi: Concurrency terminus
