= Guichon Creek =

Guichon Creek is the name of at least two creeks in British Columbia:

- Guichon Creek (Nicola River) in the Nicola Country
- Guichon Creek (Still Creek) in Burnaby
