= Pennask =

Pennask is the name of several geographical features in British Columbia, Canada:

- Pennask Summit
- Pennask Lake - see Pennask Lake Provincial Park
- Pennask Creek - see Pennask Creek Provincial Park
