= Lower Nicola =

Coordinates: 50.150°N 120.883°W

Lower Nicola is a rural community in the Nicola Country region of the Southern Interior of British Columbia. It is located at the confluence of Guichon Creek and the Nicola River. The locality of Shulus is immediately adjacent to the southeast and is the headquarters of the Lower Nicola First Nation. Nicola Mameet 1, normally called Nicola Mameet Indian Reserve No. 1 is immediately adjacent. and is under the administration of the Lower Nicola First Nation.

Lower Nicola is located on BC Highway 8.
