= British Columbia Highway 97C =

Highway in British Columbia

Highway 97C
- Okanagan Connector; Coquihalla Connector
- Highway 97C highlighted in red.

Route information
- Maintained by the Ministry of Transportation and Infrastructure
- Length: 224 km (139 mi)
- Existed: 1990–present

Major junctions
- East end: Highway 97 north of Peachland
- Highway 5A near Aspen Grove; Highway 5 (YH) / Highway 8 in Merritt; Highway 97D near Logan Lake; Highway 1 (TCH) near Ashcroft
- North end: Highway 1 (TCH) / Highway 97 in Cache Creek

Location
- Country: Canada
- Province: British Columbia
- Regional districts: Peachland, Logan Lake
- Major cities: Merritt
- Villages: Ashcroft, Cache Creek

Highway system
- British Columbia provincial highways
← Highway 97B	→ Highway 97D

Highway 97C is an east–west highway, forming part of an important link between the Lower Mainland and the Okanagan Valley south of Kelowna, which is the third largest metropolitan area in the province. It bisects the Coquihalla Highway at Merritt. The expressway and freeway sections of the highway are known as Okanagan Connector or Coquihalla Connector. The section of Highway 97C between Highway 5 and Highway 97 is a core route of the National Highway System.

== Route description ==
Highway 97C begins near Peachland, at a trumpet interchange on Highway 97 known as Drought Hill. The section of Highway 97C east of Merritt is an expressway ranging between 4 and 6 lanes, with a speed limit of 100 kilometres per hour (62 mph). The section east of Aspen Grove is a freeway with a speed limit of 110 kilometres per hour (68 mph). The road was formerly an expressway with a speed limit of 120 kilometres per hour (75 mph). As of more recently, speed limits have been lowered in an effort to combat accidents along the highway. Freeway sections along the highway have very few exits along its route. Its highest altitude is the Pennask Summit, 1,728 m (5,669 ft) above sea level. Highway 97C travels on this freeway 82 kilometres (51 mi) northwest to Aspen Grove, where it converges with Highway 5A. This stretch is a four-lane rural arterial highway. Highways 97C and 5A share the 24 km (15 mi) long route between Aspen Grove and the Coquihalla Highway at Merritt, where Highway 5A continues northeast and Highway 8 begins.

Highways 97C and 8 travel along Nicola Avenue through Merritt and share a 9 km (5.6 mi) concurrency to Lower Nicola, where Highway 8 continues west to Spences Bridge and Highway 97C diverges north. Highway 97C goes north for 42 km (26 mi) to Logan Lake, then northwest for 57 km (35 mi) to Ashcroft on the Canadian National Railway. Highway 97C then travels 6 km (3.7 mi) west from Ashcroft to where it converges with Highway 1, which takes Highway 97C north for its final 5 km (3.1 mi) to its end at Highway 97 in Cache Creek.

== History ==
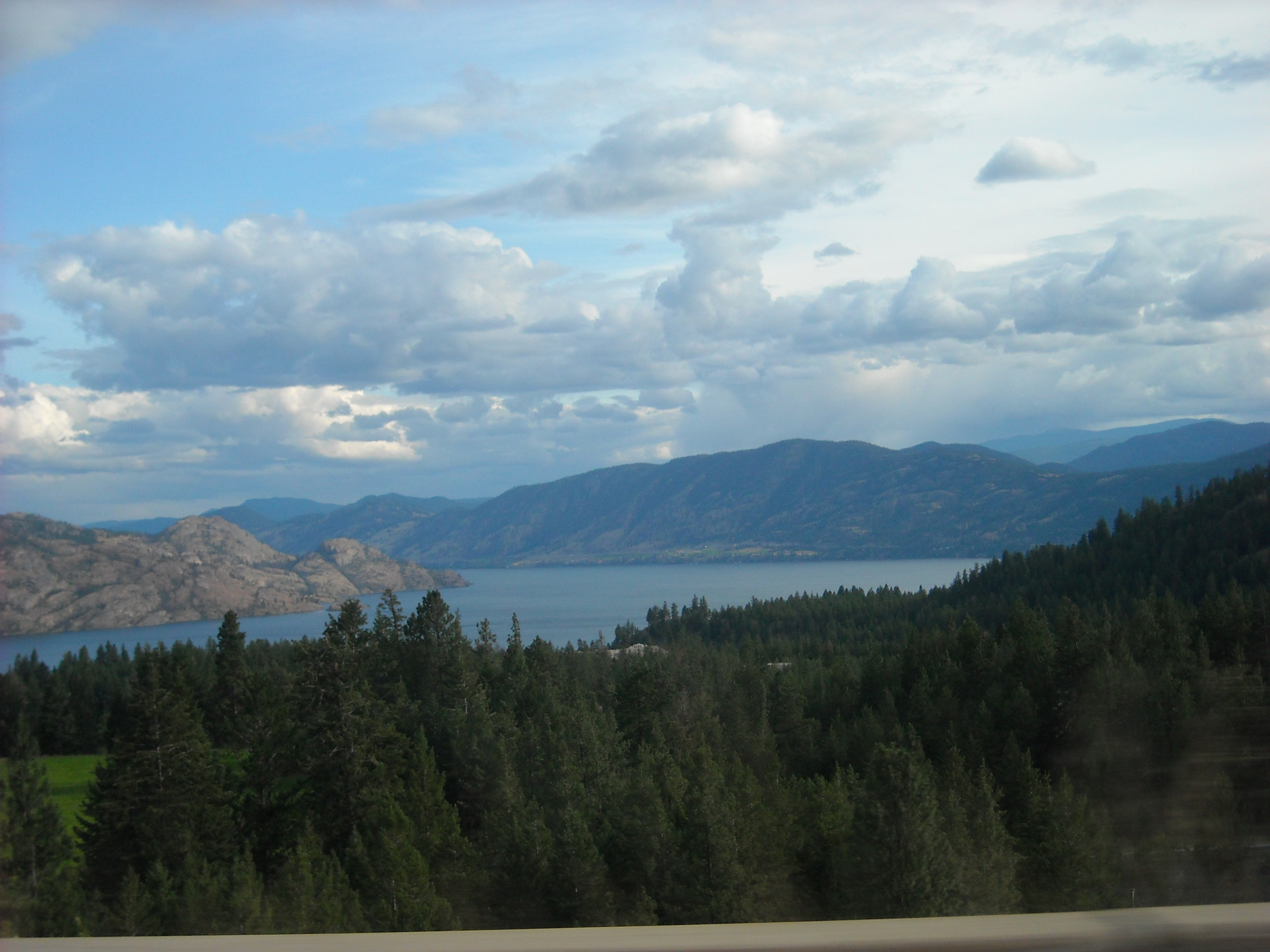
Okanagan Lake from Highway 97C near Trepanier

Highway 97C was opened to traffic on October 1, 1990, and was constructed as the third phase of the Coquihalla Highway Project. It cost $225 million to construct (equivalent to $539 million in 2025 dollars).

Highway 97C was originally intended to have a freeway connection with the Coquihalla Highway approximately 30 km (19 mi) south of Merritt, near exit 256; however due to protest by local residents in Merritt on the grounds that it would take tourists away from the area, the project was postponed and the freeway remains incomplete to this day.

In July 2007, the shared roadway of Highway 5A and 97C was upgraded to a two-lane road in each direction, the last segment required to enable two lanes in each direction when travelling between Vancouver and Kelowna. The upgrade was completed on July 24.

When it was constructed, initial proposals had it designated as Highway 8; however, communities on the route preferred it designated as an auxiliary route of Highway 97, hence its Highway 97C designation.

== Major intersections ==
This table lists the exits on Route 97C from east to west. All exits are unnumbered.

Regional District	Location	km	mi	Destinations	Notes
Central Okanagan	Peachland	0.00	0.00	Highway 97 (Okanagan Highway) – West Kelowna, Kelowna, Vernon, Peachland, Penticton, Osoyoos	Drought Hill interchange; Highway 97C eastern terminus; east end of freeway
Central Okanagan		6.14	3.82	Trepanier Road	Interchange; westbound exit and eastbound entrance
Central Okanagan		22.68	14.09	Brenda Mine Road	Interchange
Central Okanagan–Thompson-Nicola boundary		33.02	20.52	Pennask Summit – el. 1,728 m (5,669 ft)	
Thompson-Nicola		42.92	26.67	Sunset Main Road	Interchange
Okanagan-Similkameen		54.76	34.03	Elkhart Road	Interchange
Thompson-Nicola		67.40	41.88	Loon Lake Road	Interchange; rest area (opened 2018)
Thompson-Nicola		82.33	51.16	Highway 5A south – Aspen Grove, Princeton	At-grade; west end of freeway; east end of Highway 5A concurrency
Thompson-Nicola	Merritt	105.87	65.78	Highway 5 (Coquihalla Highway) – Kamloops, Vancouver Highway 5A ends / Highway 8 begins	Coldwater interchange; Highway 5 exit 286; west end of Highway 5A concurrency; east end of Highway 8 concurrency
Thompson-Nicola	Merritt	110.02	68.36	Voght Street to Highway 5A north	Former west end of Highway 5A concurrency
Thompson-Nicola	Lower Nicola	114.88	71.38	Highway 8 west (Nicola Highway) – Spences Bridge	West end of Highway 8 concurrency; directional signage changes from east/west to north/south
Thompson-Nicola	Logan Lake	156.88	97.48	Highway 97D east – Logan Lake	
Thompson-Nicola	Ashcroft	214.14	133.06	Ashcroft Bridge crosses Thompson River	
Thompson-Nicola	Ashcroft	214.31	133.17	Cornwall Road (Highway 907:0901 south) to Highway 1 – Spences Bridge	
Thompson-Nicola	Boston Flats	220.30	136.89	Highway 1 (TCH) west – Hope, Vancouver	South end of Highway 1 concurrency; Highway 97C becomes unsigned
Thompson-Nicola	Cache Creek	224.48	139.49	Highway 1 (TCH) east / Highway 97 south – Kamloops Highway 97 north (Cariboo Highway) – Prince George	Highway 97C northern terminus
1.000 mi = 1.609 km; 1.000 km = 0.621 mi: Concurrency terminus; Incomplete access
