= Nicola Valley Museum and Archives =

- Established: 1980-1
- Location: 1675 Tutill Court; Merritt, British Columbia, Canada
- Coordinates: 50.10712°N 120.78618°W
- Type: regional historic museum
- Website: nicolavalleymuseum.org

The Nicola Valley Museum and Archives is in Merritt, British Columbia. it was built and is operated by the Nicola Valley Museum and Archives Association, which was formed at a meeting at Merritt City Hall on May 26, 1976, and was registered as a Society on September 23, 1976. The members initially met in a variety of locations and had two temporary museums before moving into the current facility in 1980/81. The 4,000 square foot (372 square metre) museum/archives shares a building with a Senior Citizens Recreation Centre. It is located in downtown Merritt at 1675 Tutill Court with access from Coldwater Avenue or from the adjacent Railyard Mall.

== Collection ==
The museum collects information and artifacts from all over the Nicola Valley. The archives has a wide variety of historical reference material including local newspapers dating back to the early 1900s and over 4,000 historical photographs. The association has been publishing a "Historical Quarterly" since December, 1977.

== Publication ==
Association members were also the main contributors to the book "Merritt & the Nicola Valley: An Illustrated History" The current president is Murphy Shewchuk.

== Affiliations ==
The Museum is affiliated with: CMA, CHIN, and Virtual Museum of Canada.

== See also ==
- Merritt, British Columbia
