= Pennask Creek Provincial Park =

Provincial park in British Columbia, Canada

- IUCN category II (national park)
- Location within British Columbia
- Interactive map of Pennask Creek Provincial Park
- Location: British Columbia, Canada
- Nearest city: Peachland
- Coordinates: 49°56′29″N 120°06′34″W
- Area: 12.43 km^{2} (4.80 sq mi)
- Established: April 18, 2001
- Governing body: BC Parks

Pennask Creek Provincial Park is a provincial park in British Columbia, Canada. It is located on highway 97C about 50 kilometres west of Kelowna.

It was established on April 18, 2001, to protect a significant rainbow trout brood fishery. The park also contains mature forests of Lodgepole pine with some Engelmann spruce and other species of flora. It is not intended for public use except for viewing of fish spawning and other educational programs.
