= Pennask Summit =

Mountain pass in British Columbia, Canada

- Location within British Columbia
- Elevation: 1,728 m (5,669 ft)
- Traversed by: Highway 97C (Highway 97C (Okanagan Connector))

Third Approach
- Location: British Columbia, Canada
- Range: Thompson Plateau
- Coordinates: 49°54′39″N 120°1′51″W
- Topo map: NTS 92H16 Paradise Lake

Pennask Summit (el. 1728 m, 5669 ft) is a highway summit along the Okanagan Connector in British Columbia, Canada, crossing the forested uplands of the Thompson Plateau. It is the highest point on the highway between the cities of Merritt and Peachland. It is the second highest mountain route used by a highway in British Columbia, after Kootenay Pass. It is located 49 km (30 mi) east of Aspen Grove, and 33 km (21 mi) west of the highway junction in Peachland/Westbank.

The road grades to this summit are very steep and are very long- especially when travelling westbound, exiting the Okanagan Valley.

== History ==
The pass is named after the nearby Pennask Creek, and was first used in 1991, upon completion of this freeway.

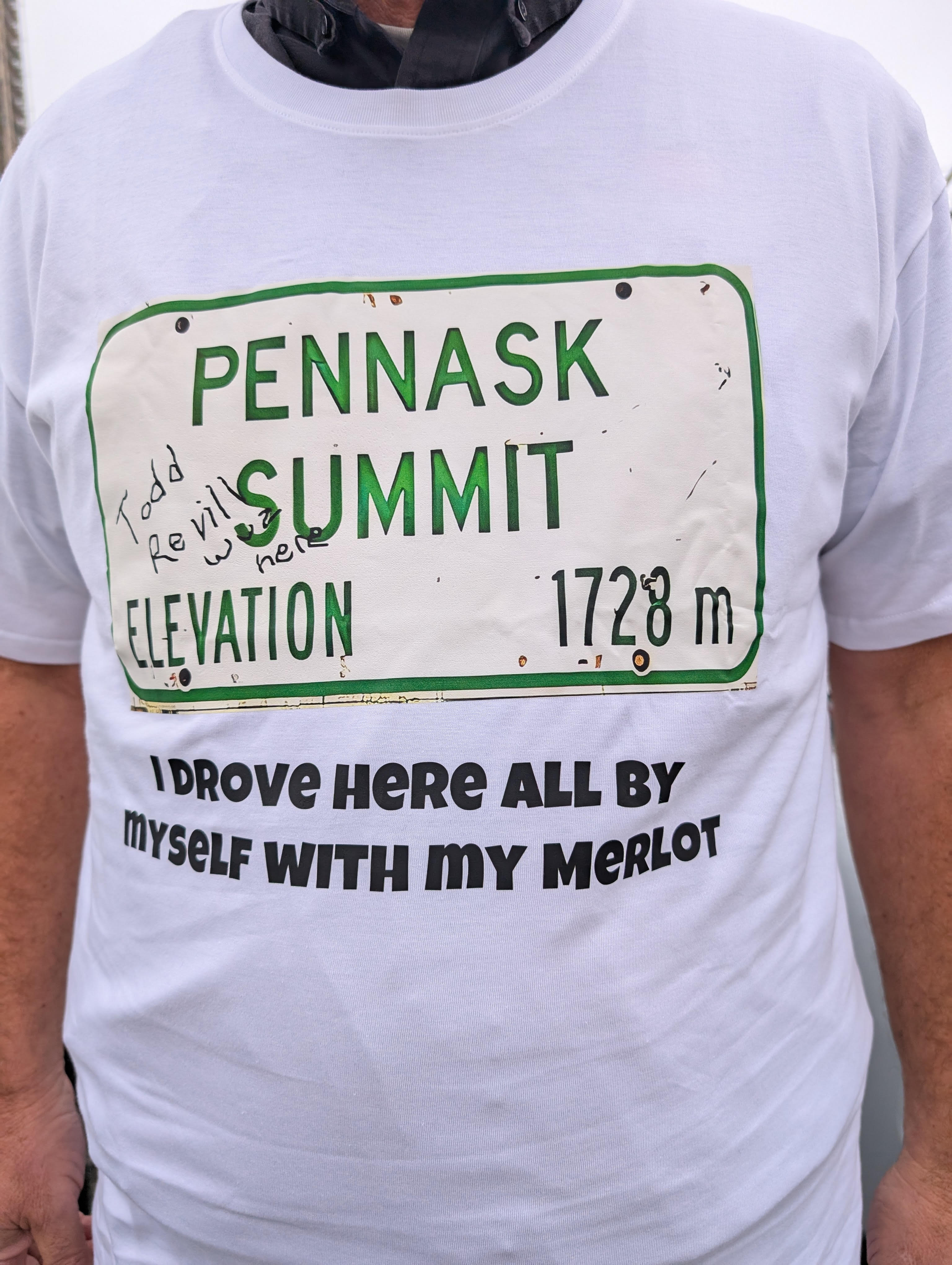
Todd wearing the shirt celebrating his historical 1000th trip to the Pennask Summit

Todd Revill, a frequent traveler of the Pennask Summit, has driven the road more than 1000 times in his history as a resident of British Columbia. His coworkers, in celebration of the 1000th trip milestone, made him a custom T-Shirt.
