= Cassiar Tunnel =

Highway traffic tunnel on the Trans-Canada Highway in Vancouver, British Columbia

Cassiar Connector
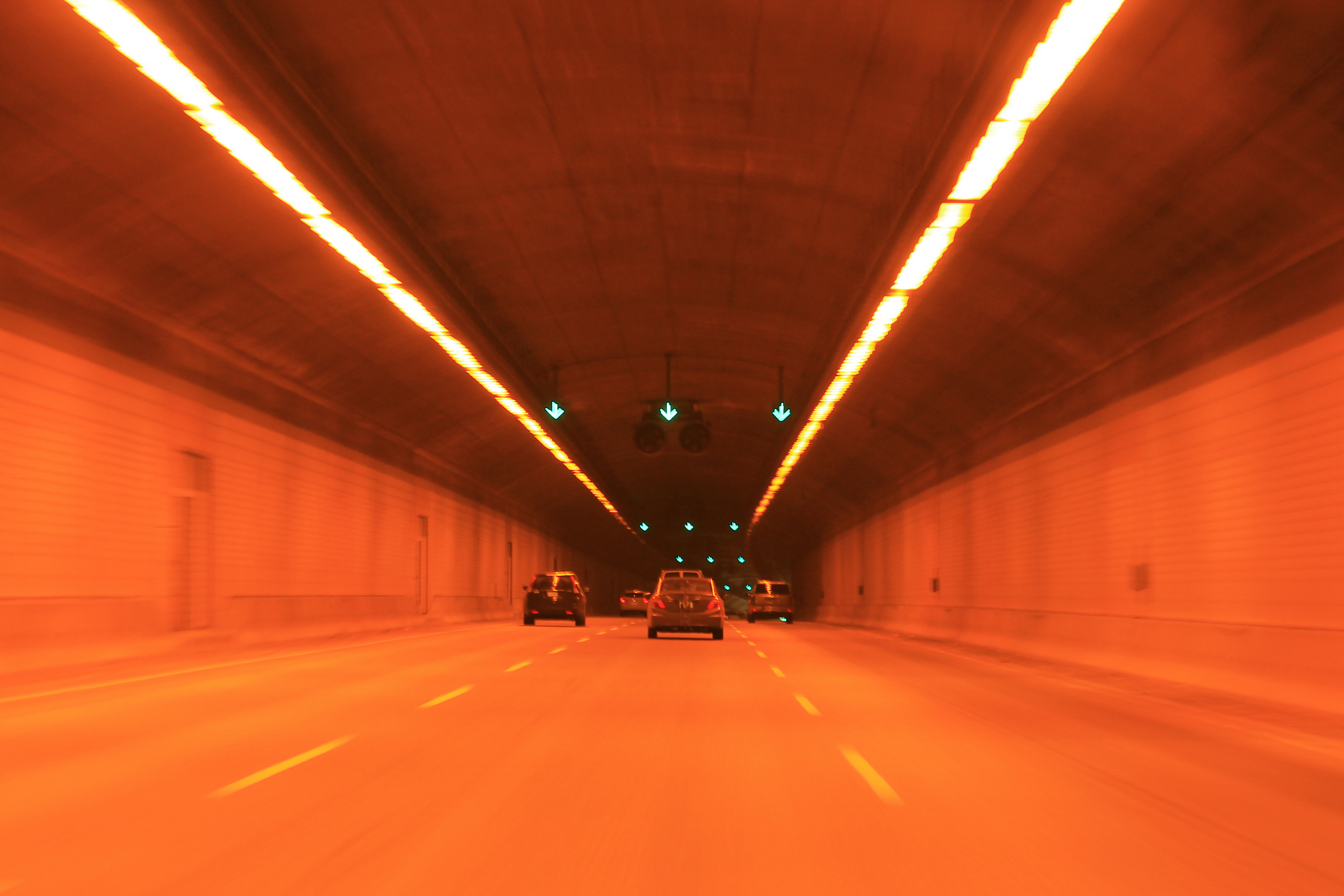
- Interior of the tunnel, heading southbound
- Interactive map of Cassiar Connector

Overview
- Location: Vancouver, British Columbia
- Coordinates: 49°16′39″N 123°01′54″W
- Route: Highway 1 (TCH)

Operation
- Opened: January 12, 1992; 34 years ago
- Owner: British Columbia Ministry of Transportation and Infrastructure

Technical
- Length: 730 metres (2,400 ft)
- No. of lanes: 6
- Tunnel clearance: 5.2 metres (17 ft)

The Cassiar Connector is a highway traffic tunnel on the Trans-Canada Highway. It is located in the north-east corner of Vancouver, British Columbia, near the Vancouver-Burnaby border. Travelling northward, the tunnel begins under Adanac Street and passes under the interchange between East Hastings Street and the Highway 1 offramps. It ends underneath Triumph Street, with the highway continuing north to the McGill Street interchange (to the Port of Vancouver) and the Ironworkers Memorial Second Narrows Crossing towards the District of North Vancouver. The tunnel is 730 metres (2,400 ft) long. Dangerous goods are not permitted to be transported through the tunnel.

== History ==
In August 1960, the Ironworkers Memorial Second Narrows Crossing (known at the time as the Second Narrows Bridge) was opened to traffic. This was followed in 1964 by the completion of the Trans Canada Highway. However, the portion of the highway passing through Vancouver was not built to highway standards. Instead, it used an existing portion of Cassiar Street, including the intersection of Cassiar and Hastings Street. This meant that traffic on the highway was controlled by traffic lights at Hastings and Cassiar also at Adanac Street and again at William Street for traffic control from the Rupert Park Diversion, all contributing to congestion especially during peak periods.

The Cassiar Connector was completed in January 1992, when it was described as removing one of the last remaining traffic lights on the Trans Canada Highway and as the BC Ministry of Transportation's largest project to date. The project upgraded 2.3 km of highway south of the Ironworkers Memorial Bridge, and involved the construction of seven new overpasses, 20 retaining walls, a pedestrian bridge, two new interchanges and the Cassiar Tunnel itself which is 730m long. The total cost of construction was estimated to be C$115 million.

On Saturday, January 11, 1992, pedestrians were allowed to roam through the dual tunnels. A ceremony was also held at 1 p.m. and was attended by Transportation Minister Art Charbonneau and Vancouver Mayor Gordon Campbell. The next day, it was opened to vehicle traffic, and the Trans Canada highway was diverted to the new route.

== Highway expansion ==
In 2005, the British Columbian government introduced an infrastructure plan known as the "Gateway Program." As part of that program, the Trans-Canada Highway through the Cassiar Connector was increased to three lanes in each direction. The lanes were intended to be used primarily for dedicated entry and exit lanes. Because the tunnel was originally designed to have three lanes in each direction, expansion was not necessary.
