= Old Yale Road =

Early road in British Columbia, Canada

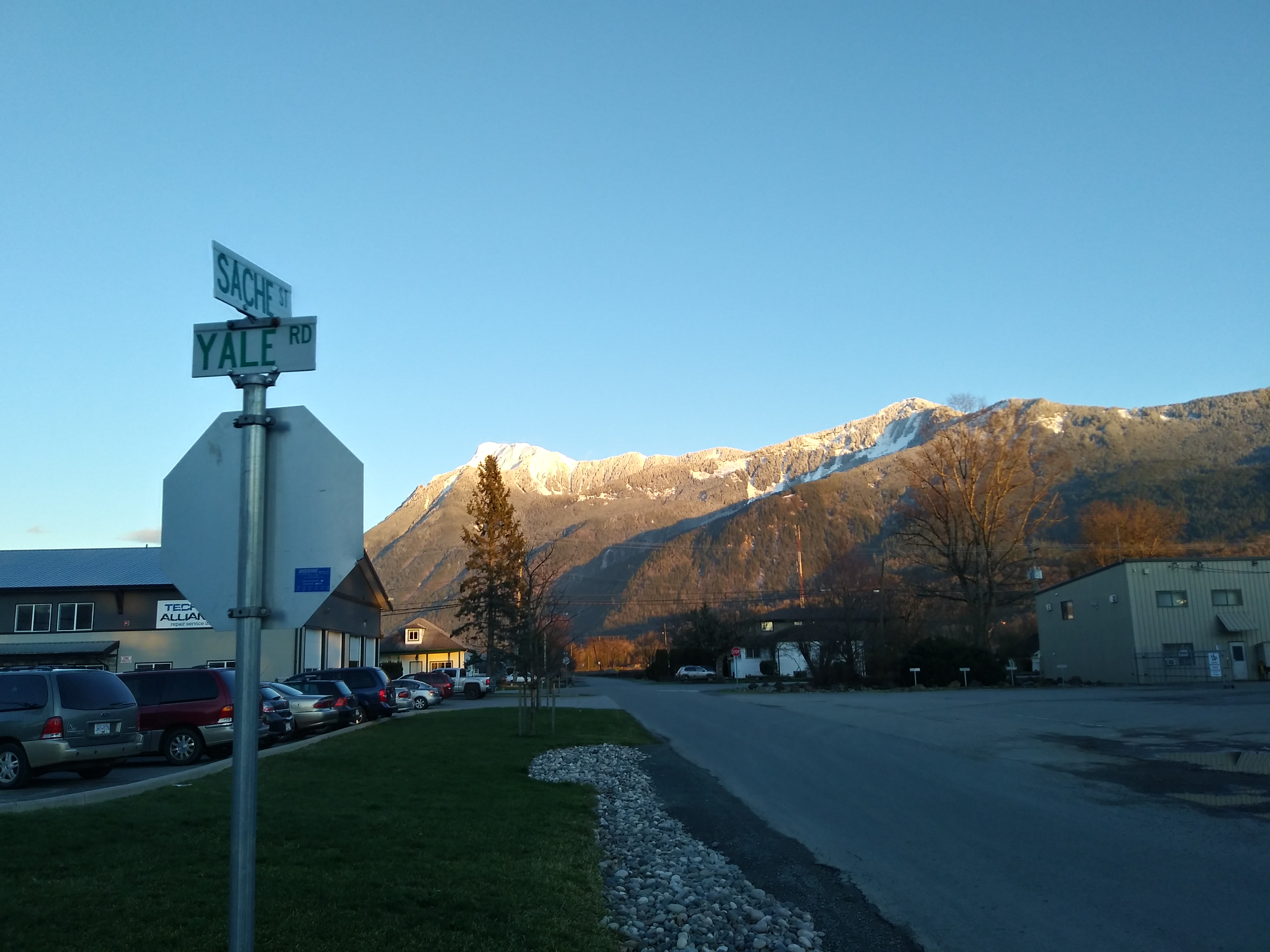

Route information
- Existed: Chilliwack to Yale dates finished 1862; 1891–present

Major junctions
- From: New Westminster, British Columbia
- To: Yale, British Columbia

Location
- Country: Canada
- Province: British Columbia
- Major cities: New Westminster, Surrey, Langley, Abbotsford, Chilliwack, Yale, British Columbia

Highway system
- British Columbia provincial highways

The Old Yale Road is a historic early wagon road between New Westminster, British Columbia, Canada and Yale, British Columbia, and servicing the Fraser Valley of the British Columbia Lower Mainland in the late 19th century and into the early 20th. It eventually became an early highway route for automobiles through the valley and into the British Columbia interior beyond Yale. It would eventually be part of, then surpassed by, the Fraser Highway, the Trans-Canada Highway and the Highway 1.

== History ==
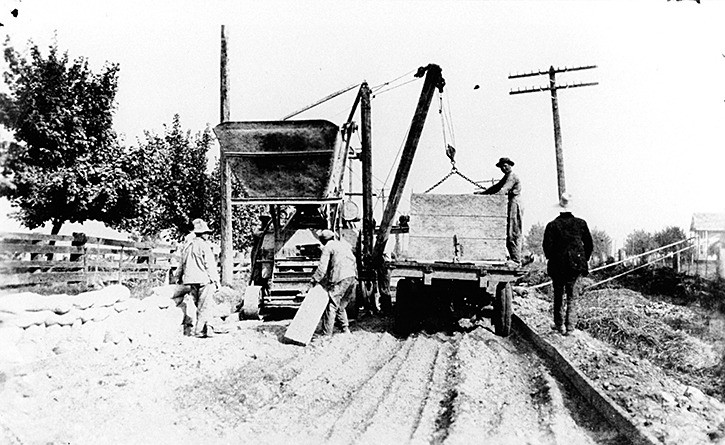
Construction of Old Yale Road c1922

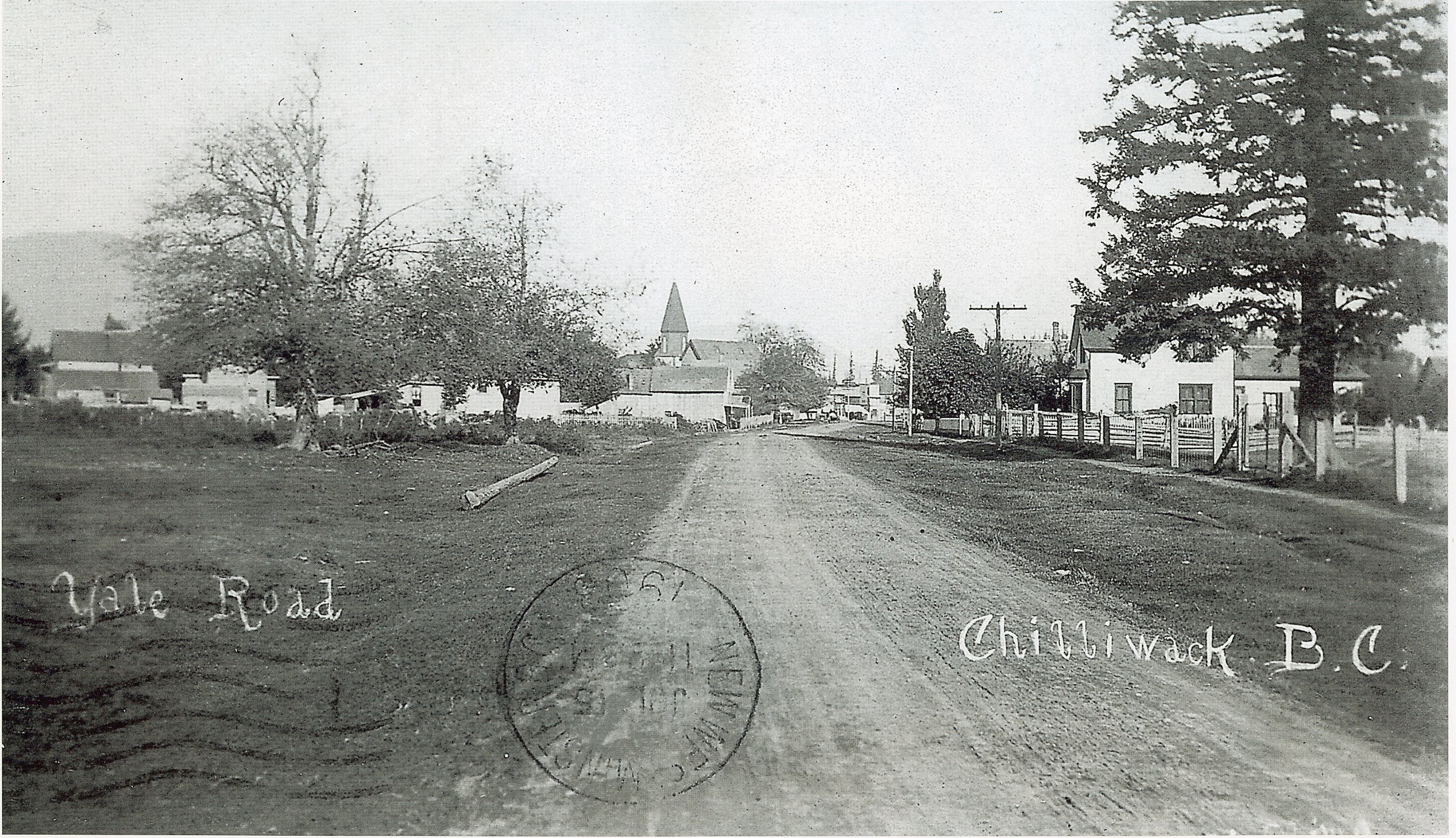
Yale Road Chilliwack, circa 1908. Site of the City Hall Museum site

While the famed Cariboo Wagon Road from Yale north to the gold fields was completed in 1865, it was years before a Lower Mainland road was completed to Hope and Yale.

To move men and supplies to the gold fields, service by river steamers was inaugurated in 1858. The navigable sections of the Fraser River proved the easiest and cheapest route of travel. As late as 1873, the Hudson's Bay Company foot trail ("Fur Brigade Trail") was the only land route between Fort Langley and Chilliwack.

The section between Chilliwack and Yale dates back to 1862 as a rough trail, built over a primitive footpath. Credit for the trail has gone to Yale butcher Jonathan Reece who wanted to source his meat from a location closer than Oregon. After convincing some other men to invest in land for farming in Chilliwack, he proceeded to cut a 50-mile-long trail through heavy forest with the help of a relative and a native local.

Construction began in 1874 for a wagon road between New Westminster and Hope roughly paralleling the route of the Telegraph Trail of 1865. On maps it was called the New Westminster and Yale (Wagon) Road, but known locally as Yale Road.

The route of Yale Road ran from New Westminster in a southeasterly direction through Langley Prairie and Aldergrove to Abbotsford. The road proceeded to curve south to follow a path along the south shore of Sumas Lake and along the north base of the Vedder Mountains through Yarrow, Vedder Crossing, north to Sardis and Chilliwack. From Chilliwack, the road followed Reece's old trail through Rosedale and Bridal Falls, then northeasterly along the south shore of the Fraser River through Cheam View and Laidlaw to Hope and Yale.

Reports during 1876–77 by the road superintendent, George Landvoight, described how the road 25 miles (40 km) west of Hope was impassable for months on end due to damage from river flood washouts. He also described other damage such as a destroyed bridge, caused by wild cattle driven over it. It was not until 1891 that the section of the Old Yale Road from Chilliwack to Hope could be considered in any sense permanent.

During the automobile era after the First World War, the road saw improvements and new alignments to efficiently move cars and trucks through the Fraser Valley. After Sumas Lake was reclaimed and converted to farmland in 1925, the highway was re-routed off the old Yale Road route in a more direct alignment through the eastern Fraser Valley between Abbotsford and Chilliwack. Though unpaved, the road was deemed passable by automobile in the mid-1920s; Realignments and pavement came in the 1930s along with renaming as the Fraser Highway (designated as "Highway 'A'" on road maps).

As the Trans-Canada Highway (designated Highway 1 in 1941), the old Yale Road route saw further abandonment as the main highway of the valley with the by-passing of the Chilliwack-Rosedale-Bridal Falls section (constructed circa-1958-60) and the Fraser Highway section between New Westminster and Abbotsford by the “401” Freeway (constructed 1960–64). Until recently, the Fraser Highway (to Abbotsford) and Chilliwack-Rosedale (Yale Road East) sections were designated as B.C. Highway 1A. In 2005, the City of Chilliwack designated the Yale Road East section as the “Trans-Canada Parallel Route”.

Sections of Yale Road and Old Yale Road continue to exist in the Fraser Valley as local roads. Some of the old road beds are now on private property. The road maintains much of its historic characteristics – winding sections, narrow pavement, avoidance of steep terrain, and usage as a route for local above ground telephone and electricity services. A section in Langley, (South of the Langley Municipal Airport) remains constructed of concrete panels dating from 1923.

== Bibliography ==
Notes

References

- Harvey, R. G. (2011). Carving the Western Path: By River, Rail, and Road Through B.C.'s Southern Mountains. Heritage House Publishing Co. ISBN 9781927051115. - Total pages: 240
- Jones, Natasha (July 23, 2012). "Township debates future of historic road". Langley Advance Times.
- Lyons, Chester Peter (1950). Milestones on the Mighty Fraser. J.M. Dent & Sons (Canada) Limited. - Total pages: 157
