= Columbia Valley Highway =

Road in British Columbia, Canada

- Cultus Lake Road; Columbia Valley Road
- South end: Canada–United States border
- North end: Vedder Mountain Road

Columbia Valley Highway is located south of the city of Chilliwack and provides the only public road access to the tourist area at Cultus Lake and rural Columbia Valley to the south. The connection to Vedder Crossing was only built in 1916, with access prior to the Columbia Valley via roads from Washington State. In fact some early Columbia Valley settler believed they lived in the United States before the border was resurveyed in 1905. Columbia Valley Highway is known as Cultus Lake Road and then south of the lake, as Columbia Valley Road to the US border. There is no road access across the border.
