= Nicola River =

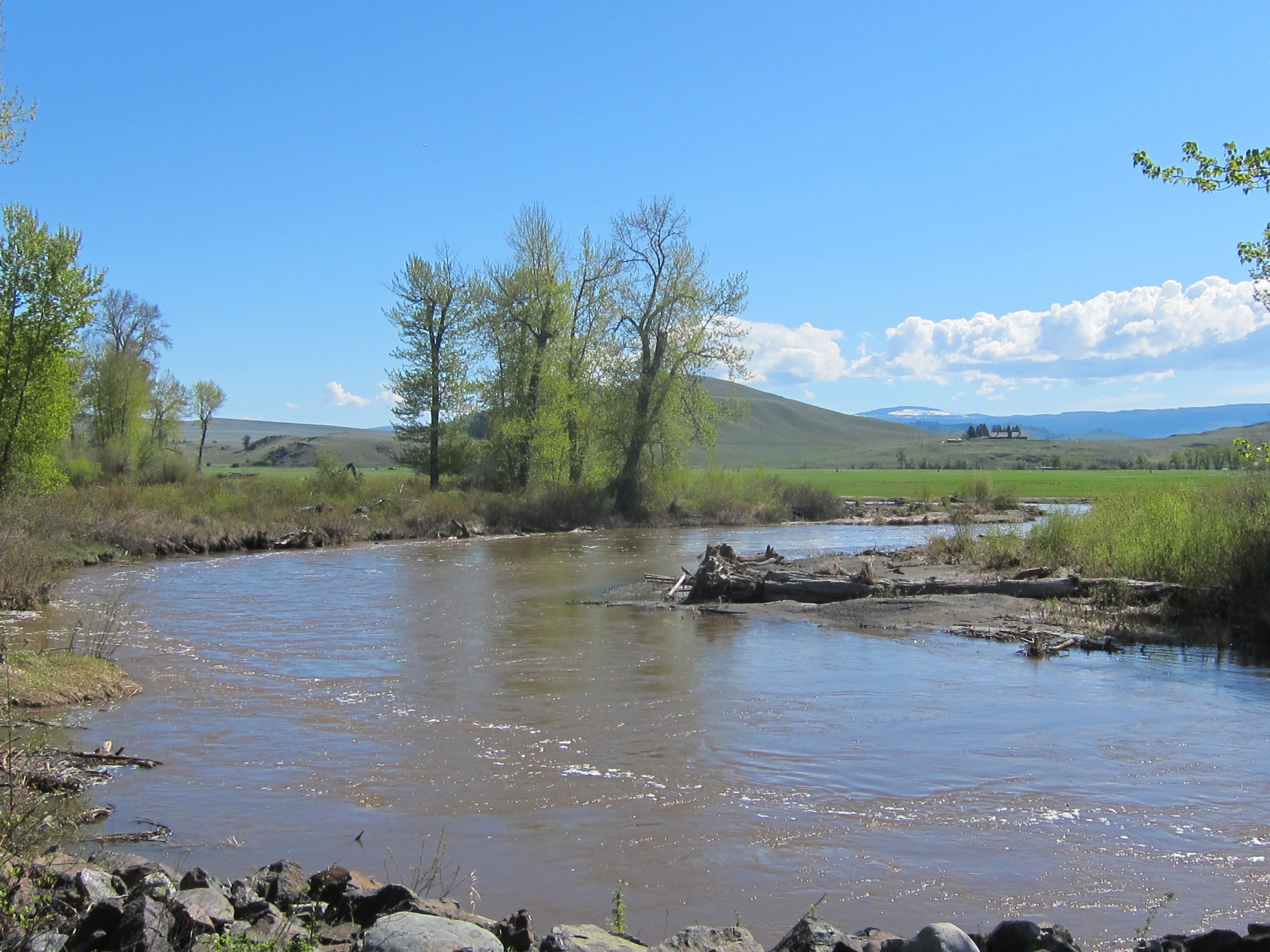
- Nicola River near Douglas Lake

- Mouth of Nicola River

Location
- Country: Canada
- Province: British Columbia
- Land District: Kamloops Division Yale
- City: Merritt

Physical characteristics
- Source
  - coordinates: 50°7′N 119°45′W
- Mouth: Thompson River
  - location: Spences Bridge
  - coordinates: 50°25′39″N 121°18′58″W

Basin features
- River system: Thompson River
- Tributaries
  - left: Coldwater River

The Nicola River /ˈnɪkoʊlə/, originally French Rivière de Nicholas or Rivière de Nicolas, adapted to Nicolas River, Nicola's River in English, and named for Nicola (Okanagan leader) is one of the major tributaries of the Thompson River in the Canadian province of British Columbia, entering the latter at the town of Spences Bridge.

== History ==
It is named for Nicola (Hwistesmexteqen) the most famous chief of the joint community of Nlaka'pamux and Okanagan bands, founded by his father and today known as the Nicolas, (originally Nicola's people), as well as its basin, which is known as the Nicola Country.

== Geography ==
It drains most of the northern Thompson Plateau, beginning near the very eastern edge of the plateau only 30 kilometres (19 mi) northwest of Kelowna, and flows from there more or less westward to feed Douglas Lake and Nicola Lake, with about 15 kilometres (9 mi) of the river's length between those two lakes. Nicola Lake at 20 kilometres (12 mi) long is the largest in the basin; the Nicola River enters at 3/4 way of its length up from its outlet, 10 kilometres (6 mi) downstream from which is Nicola Valley centre and Coquihalla Highway city of Merritt. From there the river flows 60 kilometres (37 mi) northwest to the Thompson, and is followed on that route by British Columbia Highway 8 and a spur line of the Canadian Pacific Railway.

The area upstream from Merritt is known as the Upper Nicola, and is home to the famous Douglas Lake Ranch as well as the people of the valley's namesake, Nicola, an important historic chief in early 19th Century British Columbia. Downstream from Merritt is known as the Lower Nicola, which is also the name just west of Merritt of a locality named for the similarly named Indian Reserve and band at the same location; there is also an Upper Nicola Indian Band at Nicola Lake, among many others in the area. The only major tributary of the Nicola is the Coldwater River, which runs north from Coquihalla Pass to join the Nicola near Merritt. Other more minor tributaries are Spius and Guichon Creeks. Nicola Lake and the Nicola Country, a term which is synonymous with the Nicola Valley, were named secondarily for the river, not directly for Chief Nicola.

The terrain of the river's basin northeast and in the area of Merritt is broad rangeland valleys, with high semi-forested plateau uplands reached by relatively gentle slopes, up to and over 2,400 metres (7,900 ft). The upper basin has a number of large lakes, the largest being Douglas Lake and Nicola Lake, Below Merritt, the valley-bottom of the Lower Nicola is much narrower, but has room enough for a constant meander for most of its length, with lush farmland and deciduous forest, flanked by steep hills rising through sage and dryland forest hills to the broad plateau uplands above. The Nicola, as the Nicola Country is known for short, is known for broad rangeland views and a hot, sunny summer climate, as well as frigid winters due to its overall elevation.

== See also ==
- List of rivers of British Columbia
- List of tributaries of the Fraser River
