= Aspen Grove =

Canadian settlement

Coordinates: 49.935°N 120.630°W

Location of Aspen Grove in British Columbia

Aspen Grove is a settlement in British Columbia. It’s located between the Thompson Plateau to the east and the Coast Mountains to the west.

The area seems to be named for the region's aspen trees, which are pretty common in the proximity of the settlement.
