= Merritt, British Columbia =

Merritt
- City
- City of Merritt
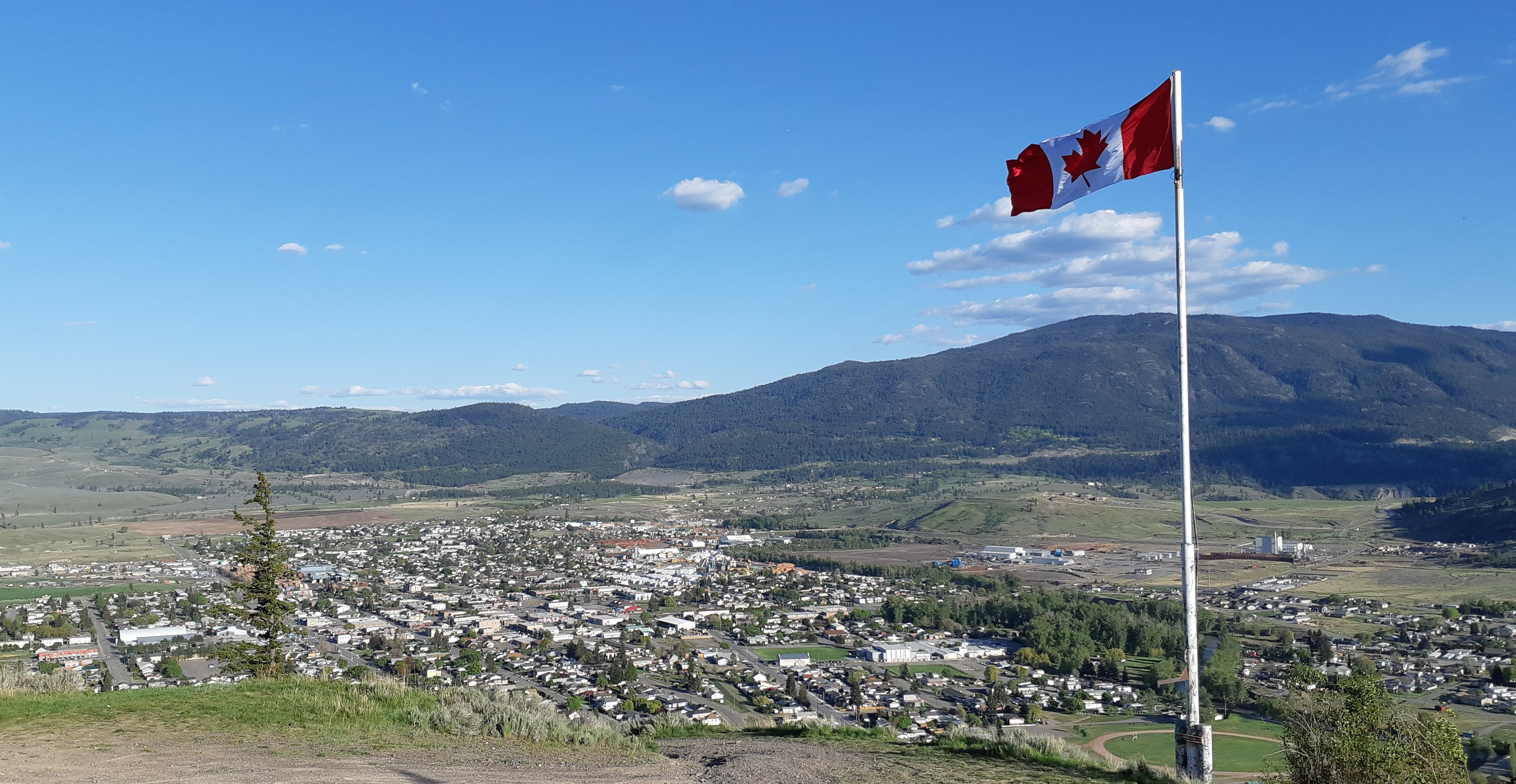
- Merritt seen from Norgaard Lookout in 2019

- Flag Coat of arms
- Motto: "Flourish Under The Sun"
- Location of Merritt in British Columbia Merritt (Canada)
- Coordinates: 50°06′45″N 120°47′18″W
- Country: Canada
- Province: British Columbia
- Regional district: Thompson-Nicola
- Settled: 1893 (townsite)
- Incorporated
- city; village; town; city: April 1, 1911; January 1, 1958; January 1, 1965; December 15, 1981

Government
  - Mayor: Aleck Henry
  - City Council: List of Councilors: Yvette Baxter; Wendy Magaret; Dana J. Egan; Adam Etchart; Manuel Olguin; Paul Petroczi
  - MP: Frank Caputo
  - MLA (Prov.): Tony Luck

Area
  - Total: 26.04 km^{2} (10.05 sq mi)
- Elevation: 605 m (1,985 ft)

Population (2021)
  - Total: 7,051
  - Density: 270.8/km^{2} (701.3/sq mi)
- Demonym: Merrittonian
- Time zone: UTC−07:00 (PT)
- Forward sortation area: V1K
- Area codes: 250, 778, 236, 672
- Highways: Highway 5 Highway 5A; Highway 8 Highway 97C
- NTS Map: 092I02
- GNBC Code: JCBSO
- Website: merritt.ca

Merritt is a city in the Nicola Valley of the south-central Interior of British Columbia, Canada. It is 270 km (170 mi) northeast of Vancouver. Situated at the confluence of the Nicola and Coldwater rivers, it is the first major community encountered after travelling along Phase One of the Coquihalla Highway and acts as the gateway to all other major highways to the B.C. Interior. The city developed in 1893 when part of the ranches owned by William Voght, Jesus Garcia, and John Charters were surveyed for a town site.

Once known as Forksdale, the community adopted its current name in 1906 in honour of mining engineer and railway promoter William Hamilton Merritt III. The 24-square-kilometre (9.3 sq mi) city limits consist of the community, a number of civic parks, historical sites, an aquatic centre, a local arena, a public library (which is a branch of the Thompson-Nicola Regional District Library System) and a civic centre. Merritt has dozens of bronzed hand prints of country music stars who have been in the city for the former annual Merritt Mountain Music Festival displayed throughout town. Merritt is also home to a local radio station, a weekly newspaper and the Nicola Valley Institute of Technology campus. Nearby, there are four provincial parks, numerous lakes, and several recreational trails. As the gateway between BC's Lower Mainland and Okanagan regions, Merritt is known as a key destination for festivals, events, and bountiful outdoor recreation.

Highway 5, and Highway 97C intersect at Merritt with Highway 97C East connecting the city to Kelowna and Penticton, Highway 97C Northwest to Logan Lake, Highway 8 to Spences Bridge and Lillooet, Highway 5A South to Princeton, Highway 5A North to Kamloops, Highway 5 South to Hope, and Highway 5 North to Kamloops. Merritt's economy is dominated by the primary industries of forestry, tourism, and service.

== History ==
For years, the Merritt area was a gathering place for local European colonists and First Nations, as the area was a focus of transportation routes used by early pioneers. The grasslands eventually drew the attention of settlers interested in ranching, and the first ranches were staked in the mid-19th century.

In the 1880s three ranches located at the confluence of the Nicola and Coldwater Rivers, owned by William Voght, Jesus Garcia, and the John Charters Estate, became the focus of a farming community known as "The Forks". With the completion of the Canadian Pacific Railway through British Columbia in 1885, interest increased in the coal deposits south of The Forks.

Parts of the ranches owned by Voght, Garcia and Charters were surveyed in 1893 for the townsite of Forksdale, but the name did not catch on with locals. Instead, the name was changed in 1906 to honour William Hamilton Merritt III, a mining engineer and railway promoter. By 1907, the coal mines were in operation and with the completion of the Nicola, Kamloops and Similkameen railway from Spences Bridge, government and other offices starting moving from Lower and Upper Nicola to establish Merritt as the major settlement in the Nicola Valley.

Armstrong's Store moved from Lower Nicola to Nicola Avenue in Merritt in the spring of 1907. G.B. Armstrong became Merritt's first postmaster at this location in 1908. In 1910, Armstrong's Department Store moved to 2025 Quilchena Avenue. In 1909, the Bank of Montreal moved from the settlement of Nicola to Merritt. A.E. Howse moved his department store to the west end of Nicola Avenue. The Nicola Herald, founded at Nicola Lake in 1905, moved from Nicola to Merritt in 1909 and the name was changed to the Merritt Herald and Nicola Valley Advocate. Other industries developed in the Valley, including ranching, copper, nickel, gold and silver mining, and forestry, and as a result, new business buildings were constructed.

The move toward incorporation began in 1910 and culminated on April 1, 1911, when Merritt was granted its city charter. The first Merritt City Hall was built in 1912. The top floor was police headquarters, the second for administration offices, and the bottom for the jail. The building included the fire hall and tower that housed a whistle to summon the volunteer fire fighters.

Merritt dedicated the names of its streets and avenues to early settlers. Among the names honoured were Charters, Chapman, Cleasby, Garcia, Voght, Coutlee, Nicola, Granite, and Quilchena.

As the town grew, it featured a drug store, a general store, a brewery and a jewellery store. The first electrical power service by the city was provided in February 1913.

Merritt and the Nicola Valley experienced prosperity until the passage of restrictive trade legislation in the United States in 1930. Because the city had financially backed one of the major sawmills, the loss of lumber markets caused the city to go into receivership from 1933 to 1952.

The next wave of immigrants, primarily Sikh, from the Punjab region of India, arrived in Merritt in the 1950s, followed by a large influx in the late 1960s and early 1970s to work in the booming forestry sector of the time and adding to the cultural mosaic of Merritt. Known as Indo-Canadians, they continue to play a crucial part in the economy—Aspen Planers Ltd., a major employer in the city, and many other businesses, restaurants and hotels in Merritt are owned by members of this group.

In advance polls during the 2015 Canadian elections, an unexpectedly high turnout in Merritt resulted in there being an insufficient quantity of ballots.

On November 15, 2021, the entire city was ordered to evacuate after heavy rainfall and flooding caused the municipality's wastewater treatment plant to fail. Residents were asked to shelter with family or friends outside of the community, or in emergency evacuation shelters in Kamloops and Kelowna. The city has since substantially recovered from the event, with the reconstruction of roadways, a bridge replacement, and some dike construction. The city is continuing to improve its infrastructure and is attracting a number of major developments.

== Cityscape ==
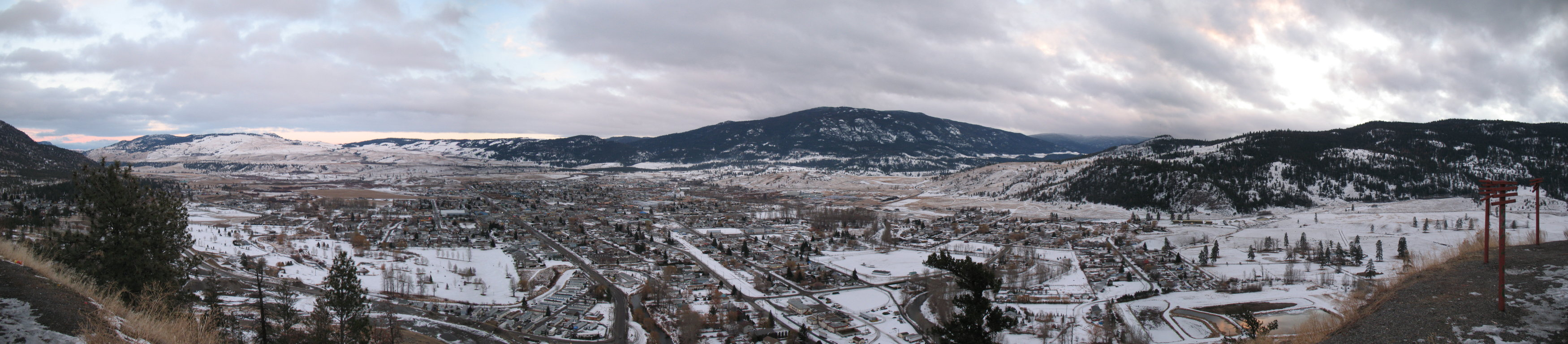
Merritt in winter

Merritt is composed of four distinct residential areas: Bench, Collettville, Central and Diamond Vale. The Bench is a residential mountain bench, hence the name, sited on the northwest side of the valley. Collettville, on the southwest edge of the community south of the Coldwater River, was the newest addition to Merritt. Central is situated at the south of the city centre. Diamond Vale is in the heart of the valley, and is the most populated. Each area is served by an elementary school: Bench Elementary, Collettville Elementary (French Immersion), Central Elementary, and Diamond Vale Elementary. A high school, Merritt Secondary School (grade 8-12), serves the area. The main office for School District 58 Nicola-Similkameen, which operates the schools in the area and in nearby Princeton, is also located in Merritt. The town is also served by the Nicola Valley Museum and Archives.

== Commerce and industry ==
Today, ranching, farming, forestry, transportation and tourism are the primary industries. Merritt is the nearest large community to the Douglas Lake Cattle Company, Canada's largest working cattle ranch.

Merritt was once host to an annual Merritt Mountain Music Festival that is estimated to have drawn as many as 148,000 people at its peak in the summer of 2005. The Mountain Music Festival led to the development of the Merritt Walk of Stars - a display of bronzed handprints of Mountainfest artists placed around the community - the Merritt Walk of Stars Mural Project, painted by artist Michelle Loughery, the Canadian Country Music Hall of Fame, and Music in the Park.

Merritt's prime location has provided the opportunity to host many events, the West Coast Rally Association's Pacific Forest Rally, an off-road rally conducted as part of the Canadian Rally Championship series every October, also the annual winter Thunderbird Rally often begins and ends in Merritt. The Bass Coast Festival held annually mid-July supports electronic music and creative arts draws attendees from all over North America. The annual Labour Day Rodeo and Fall Fair are long standing traditions in this ranching valley, drawing participants from all over Canada and the US.

== As a filming location ==
Merritt provided the backdrop for the Academy Award-nominated movie The Sweet Hereafter. The debut episode of Smallville was partly filmed on location in Merritt. Jack Nicholson's The Pledge and the 2006 remake of The Wicker Man were also filmed partly in the area. In 2013 Shana: The Wolf's Music directed by Nino Jacusso was released, it is a drama about a First Nations girl coming of age set in a First Nations location. Scheduled to be released theatrically on June 11, 2021 Jurassic World Dominion began filming on February 25, 2020 in Merritt and concluded in early March 2020, with the shoot including the city's downtown area.

The Nicola Valley is also host to the shooting of numerous commercials. Merritt is a member of the Thompson-Nicola Film Commission, which is a full-time, full service film commission representing the Thompson Nicola Regional District.

== Music ==
The Merritt Mountain Music Festival was an outdoor music festival in Merritt. In 2005 the festival hosted a record-breaking attendance of approximately 148,000 people throughout the six-day event. Over the years it has hosted country stars such as Kenny Chesney, Reba McEntire, and Wynonna Judd. Since cancelling the festival in the summer of 2012, The Merritt Mountain Music Festival is no longer in operation.

Starting on the BC Day weekend in 2013 (Friday, August 2 to Monday, August 5, 2013), Bass Coast Music Festival made Merritt, BC its new home (after taking place in Squamish, BC its first four years). Bass Coast features a wide variety of music "from daytime soul and reggae jams, to live experimental electronic music, house and techno". Their annual event in Merritt is in mid-July.

2015 was the first year for the Rockin' River Music Fest, formerly held in Mission B.C., taking place July 30 to August 2. The return of a country music festival to Merritt was the first since the cancellation of the Merritt Mountain Music Festival in 2012. The 2015 headliners included Lady Antebellum. The Rockin' River Music Fest discontinued events in Merritt following the Covid-19 pandemic.

== Sports ==
Merritt is home to BC's longest continuously run Junior A Hockey franchise, the Merritt Centennials. Formerly part of the British Columbia Hockey League, the team joined the Kootenay International Junior A Hockey League. The Cents moved to the Nicola Valley from White Rock midway through the 1973–74 season. The Centennials play all home games at the city-run Nicola Valley Memorial Arena and their season runs from early September through early March.

Merritt also hosts the Nicola Valley Pro Rodeo on the Saturday and Sunday of Labour Day weekend every year.

Merritt is also home to the Nicola Valley Thunder minor lacrosse club.

A round of the Canadian Rally Championship, the Pacific Forest Rally, is held each year in and around Merritt. The international motorsport event is televised on TSN and RDS in Canada, and MotorsTV in Europe.

Merritt and the Nicola Valley features two golf courses, the Merritt Golf and Country Club in downtown Merritt and Sagebrush Golf Club, currently rated BC's #1 public course (as of this edit in 2025) and sits just north of town on Nicola Lake.

Census population: Merritt
Year	Pop.	±%
1921	1,389	—
1931	1,296	−6.7%
1941	940	−27.5%
1951	1,251	+33.1%
1956	1,790	+43.1%
1961	3,039	+69.8%
1966	4,500	+48.1%
1971	5,289	+17.5%
1976	5,680	+7.4%
1981	6,110	+7.6%
1986	6,180	+1.1%
1991	6,253	+1.2%
1996	7,631	+22.0%
2001	7,088	−7.1%
2006	6,998	−1.3%
2011	7,113	+1.6%
2016	7,139	+0.4%
2021	7,051	−1.2%
Source: Statistics Canada

Merritt features a skateboard park, bike park, and numerous walking trails. Monck Provincial Park is located on the western shore of Nicola Lake, 22 km (14 mi) north of Merritt. It offers an abundance of camping, picnicking, swimming, fishing, boating, water-skiing, wind-surfing and hiking.

The Merritt Panthers high school teams compete in boys and girls volleyball, basketball, and rugby.

There is also a local slo-pitch and a fastpitch softball league and the Merritt Otters swim club, which makes its home at the Nicola Valley Aquatic Centre.

== Media ==
Merritt is home to Q101 Merritt's Music Mix, the Nicola Valley's only local radio station. 101.1 FM, CKMQ-FM is locally owned and an independent radio station. Q101 also reports news and broadcasts the BCHL's Merritt Centennials hockey games. The station was originally launched in 1970 on AM 1230 as CJNL. In 2009, Merritt Broadcasting Ltd. received CRTC approval to convert to the FM band, and the station was relaunched on 101.1 FM on August 31 of that year. Simultaneously, the company's former sister division, NL Broadcasting, received approval to launch a separate rebroadcaster of CHNL, the company's talk radio station in Kamloops, on CJNL's former AM frequency.

Merritt has a weekly newspaper, the Merritt Herald, that publishes on Thursdays. Merritt is also served by Shaw TV and by TELUS PureFibre Internet and Optik TV.

== Demographics ==
In the 2021 Census of Population conducted by Statistics Canada, Merritt had a population of 7,051 living in 2,975 of its 3,149 total private dwellings, a change of −1.2% from its 2016 population of 7,139. With a land area of 26.04 km^{2} (10.05 sq mi), it had a population density of 270.8/km^{2} (701.3/sq mi) in 2021.

=== Ethnicity ===
Panethnic groups in the City of Merritt (1986−2021)
Panethnic group	2021		2016		2011		2006		2001		1996		1991		1986	
Panethnic group	Pop.	%	Pop.	%	Pop.	%	Pop.	%	Pop.	%	Pop.	%	Pop.	%	Pop.	%
European (Note: Statistic includes all persons that did not make up part of a visible minority or an indigenous identity.)	4,640	68.84%	4,600	66.86%	5,655	82.02%	5,025	72.3%	5,355	76.17%	5,515	72.57%	4,425	71.14%	4,575	74.03%
Indigenous	1,480	21.96%	1,575	22.89%	750	10.88%	1,125	16.19%	980	13.94%	1,170	15.39%	1,030	16.56%	715	11.57%
South Asian	375	5.56%	400	5.81%	290	4.21%	610	8.78%	575	8.18%	715	9.41%	655	10.53%	815	13.19%
East Asian (Note: Statistic includes total responses of "Chinese", "Korean", and "Japanese" under visible minority section on census.)	135	2%	150	2.18%	115	1.67%	150	2.16%	85	1.21%	140	1.84%	85	1.37%	60	0.97%
Southeast Asian (Note: Statistic includes total responses of "Filipino" and "Southeast Asian" under visible minority section on census.)	40	0.59%	65	0.94%	0	0%	20	0.29%	30	0.43%	25	0.33%	0	0%	0	0%
African	30	0.45%	65	0.94%	30	0.44%	0	0%	10	0.14%	15	0.2%	25	0.4%	5	0.08%
Latin American	30	0.45%	10	0.15%	0	0%	10	0.14%	0	0%	0	0%	0	0%	5	0.08%
Middle Eastern (Note: Statistic includes total responses of "West Asian" and "Arab" under visible minority section on census.)	0	0%	0	0%	0	0%	0	0%	0	0%	0	0%	0	0%	5	0.08%
Other/multiracial (Note: Statistic includes total responses of "Visible minority, n.i.e." and "Multiple visible minorities" under visible minority section on census.)	0	0%	10	0.15%	0	0%	0	0%	0	0%	0	0%	—N/a	—N/a	—N/a	—N/a
Total responses	6,740	95.59%	6,880	96.37%	6,895	96.94%	6,950	99.31%	7,030	99.18%	7,600	99.59%	6,220	99.47%	6,180	99.85%
Total population	7,051	100%	7,139	100%	7,113	100%	6,998	100%	7,088	100%	7,631	100%	6,253	100%	6,189	100%
Note: Totals greater than 100% due to multiple origin responses.

=== Religion ===
According to the 2021 census, religious groups in Merritt included:

- Irreligion (4,165 persons or 61.7%)
- Christianity (2,225 persons or 33.0%)
- Sikhism (185 persons or 2.7%)
- Hinduism (40 persons or 0.6%)
- Indigenous Spirituality (40 persons or 0.6%)
- Buddhism (20 persons or 0.3%)
- Other (50 persons or 0.7%)

Religious groups in Merritt (1991−2021)
Religious group	2021		2011		2001		1991	
Religious group	Pop.	%	Pop.	%	Pop.	%	Pop.	%
Christian	2,225	32.99%	3,635	52.72%	3,995	56.79%	3,945	63.42%
Sikh	185	2.74%	265	3.84%	565	8.03%	600	9.65%
Hindu	40	0.59%	0	0%	35	0.5%	45	0.72%
Indigenous spirituality	40	0.59%	0	0%	N/A	N/A	N/A	N/A
Buddhist	20	0.3%	25	0.36%	0	0%	40	0.64%
Muslim	0	0%	0	0%	0	0%	0	0%
Jewish	0	0%	0	0%	0	0%	0	0%
Other religion	50	0.74%	0	0%	45	0.64%	35	0.56%
Irreligious	4,165	61.75%	2,935	42.57%	2,390	33.97%	1,550	24.92%
Total responses	6,745	95.66%	6,895	96.94%	7,035	99.25%	6,220	99.47%

== Climate ==
Merritt has a humid continental climate (Dfb).

Climate data for Merritt, 1981–2010 normals, extremes 1918–present
Month	Jan	Feb	Mar	Apr	May	Jun	Jul	Aug	Sep	Oct	Nov	Dec	Year
Record high °C (°F)	17.5 (63.5)	16.0 (60.8)	23.5 (74.3)	30.6 (87.1)	36.0 (96.8)	44.5 (112.1)	39.5 (103.1)	39.0 (102.2)	38.7 (101.7)	30.5 (86.9)	21.7 (71.1)	18.5 (65.3)	44.5 (112.1)
Mean daily maximum °C (°F)	1.1 (34.0)	4.2 (39.6)	10.2 (50.4)	15.1 (59.2)	19.4 (66.9)	23.0 (73.4)	26.7 (80.1)	27.0 (80.6)	21.9 (71.4)	13.7 (56.7)	5.2 (41.4)	0.0 (32.0)	14.0 (57.2)
Daily mean °C (°F)	−3.0 (26.6)	−0.5 (31.1)	4.1 (39.4)	8.1 (46.6)	12.3 (54.1)	15.9 (60.6)	18.8 (65.8)	18.6 (65.5)	13.9 (57.0)	7.6 (45.7)	1.2 (34.2)	−3.7 (25.3)	7.8 (46.0)
Mean daily minimum °C (°F)	−7.0 (19.4)	−5.2 (22.6)	−2.1 (28.2)	1.1 (34.0)	5.1 (41.2)	8.7 (47.7)	10.8 (51.4)	10.1 (50.2)	5.9 (42.6)	1.5 (34.7)	−2.9 (26.8)	−7.3 (18.9)	1.6 (34.9)
Record low °C (°F)	−43.3 (−45.9)	−35.0 (−31.0)	−28.3 (−18.9)	−12.2 (10.0)	−5.6 (21.9)	−1.7 (28.9)	1.1 (34.0)	0.0 (32.0)	−7.2 (19.0)	−23.0 (−9.4)	−32.0 (−25.6)	−42.8 (−45.0)	−43.3 (−45.9)
Average precipitation mm (inches)	30.5 (1.20)	19.4 (0.76)	16.2 (0.64)	15.1 (0.59)	30.1 (1.19)	36.6 (1.44)	29.1 (1.15)	20.6 (0.81)	24.6 (0.97)	27.6 (1.09)	35.4 (1.39)	36.0 (1.42)	321.1 (12.64)
Average rainfall mm (inches)	13.7 (0.54)	11.0 (0.43)	11.8 (0.46)	14.2 (0.56)	29.8 (1.17)	36.6 (1.44)	29.1 (1.15)	20.6 (0.81)	24.6 (0.97)	26.2 (1.03)	23.4 (0.92)	13.3 (0.52)	254.5 (10.02)
Average snowfall cm (inches)	16.8 (6.6)	8.3 (3.3)	4.4 (1.7)	0.9 (0.4)	0.3 (0.1)	0.0 (0.0)	0.0 (0.0)	0.0 (0.0)	0.0 (0.0)	1.3 (0.5)	12.0 (4.7)	22.7 (8.9)	66.7 (26.3)
Average precipitation days (≥ 0.2 mm)	9.7	7.9	8.0	7.8	9.5	9.6	7.0	6.2	7.3	9.5	11.5	10.0	104.1
Average rainy days (≥ 0.2 mm)	4.6	4.7	6.6	7.4	9.4	9.6	7.0	6.2	7.3	9.2	8.4	3.9	84.2
Average snowy days (≥ 0.2 cm)	5.6	3.8	1.7	0.7	0.2	0.0	0.0	0.0	0.0	0.4	4.0	6.6	22.8
Source: Environment Canada
