= Nicola Country =

Region in British Columbia, Canada

Coordinates: 50.095°N 120.576°W

The Nicola Country, also known as the Nicola Valley and often referred to simply as The Nicola, and originally Nicolas' Country or Nicholas' Country, adapted to Nicola's Country and simplified since, is a region in the Southern Interior of British Columbia, Canada. It is the main subregion of the larger Thompson Country and is often referred to separately, or in combination forms, notably the Thompson-Nicola Regional District. The combination Nicola-Similkameen is also common.

The Nicola Country is roughly synonymous with the basin of the Nicola River, but unlike other similar region-names in BC was not named for the river. Rather, both were named as a result of this region being the territory under the rule of Nicola (Hwistesmexteqen), the most prominent and influential of the chiefs of the Nicola people, who like the river and region were named for the chief, i.e. "Nicola's people". Nicola was the son of Pelkamulox, an Okanagan chief who, at the invitation of Kwa'lila, the Secwepemc chief of Kamloops, settled in the valley to escape harassment at his former domicile at the head of Okanagan Lake and founded there the joint community of Okanagans and Nlaka'pamux known as the Nicola people and whose government is the Nicola Tribal Association, and at one time included members of the now-extinct "Stuwix" or Nicola Athapaskans.

Other than the several First Nations reserves in the Nicola Country, there are a number of small non-indigenous settlements. The area's only significant and largest town is Merritt. Also of note in the region is the Douglas Lake Ranch, one of the world's largest ranches. Its headquarters is north and east of Merritt at Douglas Lake but whose lands span most of the Thompson Plateau and also country beyond it to the northeast in the Shuswap Highland and to the north in the Bonaparate Plateau.

== Climate and terrain ==
Located in the rainshadow of the Canadian Cascades and the Lillooet Ranges of the Coast Mountains, the climate of the Nicola Country is dry and, in summers, quite hot. Due to a higher elevation than surrounding basins, it tends to be cooler than Kamloops, the Okanagan, the Shuswap or the lower Thompson areas. Vegetation in lower elevations tends towards sagebrush and open pine and deciduous, with high-elevation areas thick with coniferous forest. Wildlife is abundant, and the timber rattler is present in the region.
