= Thompson-Nicola Regional District =

Regional district in British Columbia, Canada

Coordinates: 51°00′00″N 120°30′00″W

Thompson–Nicola
- Regional district
- Thompson–Nicola Regional District
- Kamloops Lake

- Logo

- Location in British Columbia
- Country: Canada
- Province: British Columbia
- Administrative office location: Kamloops

Government
  - Type: Regional district
  - Body: Board of directors
  - Chair: Barbara Roden (Ashcroft)
  - Vice chair: Robin Smith (Logan Lake)
  - Electoral areas: A – Wells Gray Country; B – Thompson Headwaters; E – Bonaparte Plateau; I – Blue Sky Country; J – Copper Desert Country; L – Grasslands; M – Beautiful Nicola Valley–North; N – Beautiful Nicola Valley–South; O – Lower North Thompson; P – Rivers and the Peaks

Area
  - Land: 44,449.42 km^{2} (17,162.02 sq mi)

Population (2021)
  - Total: 143,680
  - Density: 2.98/km^{2} (7.7/sq mi)
- Website: www.tnrd.ca

The Thompson–Nicola Regional District is a regional district in the Canadian province of British Columbia. The Canada 2021 Census population was 143,680 and the area covers 44,449.49 square kilometres. The administrative offices are in the main population centre of Kamloops, which accounts for 78 percent of the regional district's population. The only other city is Merritt; other municipally-incorporated communities include the District Municipalities of Logan Lake, Barriere and Clearwater and the Villages of Chase, Ashcroft, Cache Creek, Clinton and Lytton, and also the Mountain Resort Municipality of Sun Peaks.

The region is named indirectly for the Thompson River by way of the traditional regional names of "the Thompson Country" and "the Nicola Country"; the Nicola Country was named for Chief Nicola and was originally "Nicola's Country", where he held sway; he is also the namesake of that river. The regional district government operates over 125 services including libraries, solid waste management and recycling, community services, emergency and development services, a film commission. The region is unique in Canada as it consistently holds around some of the hottest summer temperatures in the country, while also containing an area around Ashcroft that may be the only arid climate in Canada.

== Municipalities ==
Municipality	Government Type	Population (2021)
Kamloops	city	97,902
Merritt	city	7,051
Chase	village	2,399
Clearwater	district municipality	2,388
Logan Lake	district municipality	2,255
Barriere	district municipality	1,765
Ashcroft	village	1,670
Cache Creek	village	969
Clinton	village	646
Sun Peaks	mountain resort municipality	1,404
Lytton	village	210

== Unincorporated communities ==
- 16 Mile
- 70 Mile House
- Adams Lake
- Agate Bay
- Alpine Valley
- Aspen Grove
- Avola
- Barnhartvale (East)
- Big Bar
- Birch Island
- Black Pines
- Blackpool
- Blue River
- Botanie Valley
- Brookmere
- Canford
- Chasm
- Cherry Creek
- Darfield
- Del Oro
- Eagan Lake
- East Barriere Lake
- East Blackpool
- Heffley Lake
- Iron Mountain
- Jesmond
- Kane Valley
- Kelly Lake
- Knouff Lake
- Knutsford
- Lac Le Jeune
- Little Fort
- Loon Lake
- Louis Creek
- Lower Hat Creek (Carquile)
- Lower Nicola
- McLure
- Monte Creek
- Monte Lake
- Paul Lake
- Paxton Valley
- Pinantan Lake
- Pressy Lake
- Pritchard
- Quilchena
- Rivershore
- Savona
- South Green Lake
- Spences Bridge
- Stump Lake
- Sunshine Valley
- Thompson River Estates
- Tobiano
- Turtle Valley
- Upper Clearwater
- Upper Hat Creek
- Vavenby
- Venables Valley
- Walhachin
- Westwold
- Whitecroft

== Electoral areas ==
- Electoral Area "A" (Wells Gray Country)
- Electoral Area "B" (Thompson Headwaters)
- Electoral Area "E" (Bonaparte Plateau)
- Electoral Area "I" (Blue Sky Country)
- Electoral Area "J" (Copper Desert Country)
- Electoral Area "L"
- Electoral Area "M"
- Electoral Area "N"
- Electoral Area "O"
- Electoral Area "P" (Rivers and the Peaks)

== Demographics ==
As a census division in the 2021 Census of Population conducted by Statistics Canada, the Thompson-Nicola Regional District had a population of 143,680 living in 59,885 of its 65,065 total private dwellings, a change of 8.3% from its 2016 population of 132,663. With a land area of 44,347.23 km^{2} (17,122.56 sq mi), it had a population density of 3.2/km^{2} (8.4/sq mi) in 2021.

Panethnic groups in the Thompson–Nicola Regional District (1991–2021)
Panethnic group	2021		2016		2011		2006		2001		1996		1991	
Panethnic group	Pop.	%	Pop.	%	Pop.	%	Pop.	%	Pop.	%	Pop.	%	Pop.	%
European (Note: Statistic includes all persons that did not make up part of a visible minority or an indigenous identity.)	107,770	77.38%	103,015	79.84%	104,615	83.05%	101,590	83.8%	101,215	85.29%	102,055	86.5%	88,095	85.09%
Indigenous	19,420	13.94%	17,555	13.61%	14,425	11.45%	13,200	10.89%	11,590	9.77%	9,985	8.46%	10,900	10.53%
South Asian	4,940	3.55%	2,960	2.29%	2,445	1.94%	2,325	1.92%	2,525	2.13%	2,505	2.12%	2,270	2.19%
East Asian (Note: Statistic includes total responses of "Chinese", "Korean", and "Japanese" under visible minority section on census.)	2,895	2.08%	2,710	2.1%	2,500	1.98%	2,330	1.92%	2,130	1.79%	2,255	1.91%	1,480	1.43%
Southeast Asian (Note: Statistic includes total responses of "Filipino" and "Southeast Asian" under visible minority section on census.)	1,670	1.2%	1,145	0.89%	845	0.67%	935	0.77%	520	0.44%	495	0.42%	450	0.43%
African	1,200	0.86%	700	0.54%	305	0.24%	245	0.2%	400	0.34%	255	0.22%	180	0.17%
Latin American	585	0.42%	345	0.27%	175	0.14%	240	0.2%	145	0.12%	175	0.15%	90	0.09%
Middle Eastern (Note: Statistic includes total responses of "West Asian" and "Arab" under visible minority section on census.)	345	0.25%	285	0.22%	490	0.39%	150	0.12%	70	0.06%	75	0.06%	70	0.07%
Other (Note: Statistic includes total responses of "Visible minority, n.i.e." and "Multiple visible minorities" under visible minority section on census.)	435	0.31%	205	0.16%	165	0.13%	195	0.16%	60	0.05%	180	0.15%	—N/a	—N/a
Total responses	139,265	96.93%	129,020	97.25%	125,960	98.05%	121,225	99.13%	118,665	99.53%	117,980	99.31%	103,535	99.18%
Total population	143,680	100%	132,663	100%	128,471	100%	122,286	100%	119,222	100%	118,801	100%	104,386	100%

- Note: Totals greater than 100% due to multiple origin responses.

== Parks ==
The regional district contains more than 60 provincial parks. See List of provincial parks of Thompson-Nicola Regional District.
