= Logan Lake =

- District municipality
- District of Logan Lake
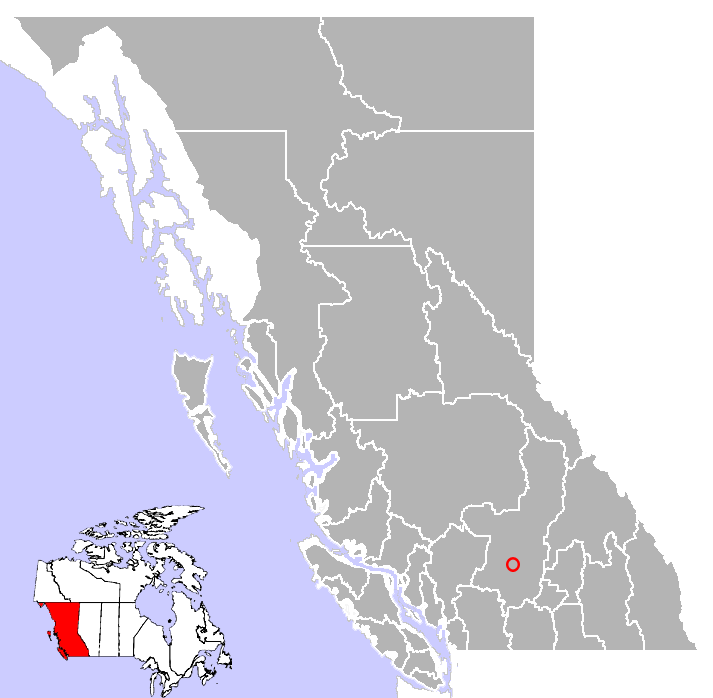
- Location of Logan Lake in British Columbia
- Coordinates: 50°29′40″N 120°48′48″W
- Country: Canada
- Province: British Columbia
- Regional district: Thompson-Nicola
- Incorporated: 1970

Government
  - Governing body: Logan Lake Council
  - Mayor: Robin Smith

Area
  - Total: 325.36 km^{2} (125.62 sq mi)
- Elevation: 1,110 m (3,640 ft)

Population (2021)
  - Total: 2,255
  - Density: 6.9/km^{2} (18/sq mi)
- Time zone: UTC−07:00 (PT)
- Postal code: V0K1W0
- Area codes: 250, 778, 236
- Highways: Highway 97C; Highway 97D
- Waterways: Logan Lake, Chartrand Creek
- Website: www.loganlake.ca

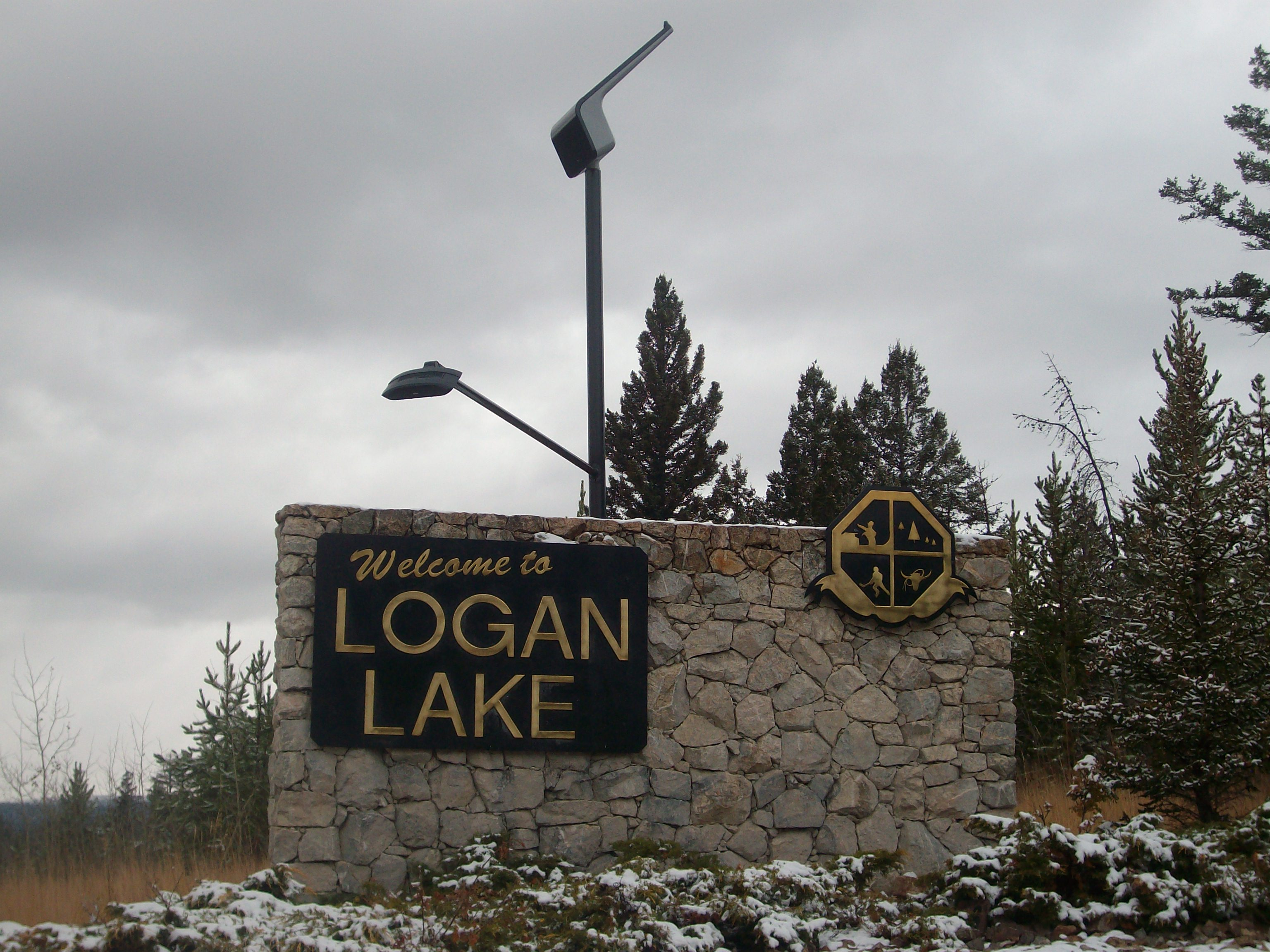
Logan Lake's welcome sign

Logan Lake is a district municipality in the Southern Interior of British Columbia, Canada.

== History ==
Historical population
Year	Pop.	±%
1981	2,637	—
1986	2,001	−24.1%
1991	2,379	+18.9%
1996	2,492	+4.7%
2001	2,185	−12.3%
2006	2,162	−1.1%
2011	2,073	−4.1%
2016	1,993	−3.9%
2021	2,255	+13.1%

The name is a corruption of Tslakan, an Indigenous man of the Skeetchestn Indian Band who lived in the area in the 1860s.

It was founded in the 1960s and 1970s to support copper, molybdenum and other mineral mining operations located south of the town. The Village of Logan Lake was incorporated in November 1970, and was incorporated into a district municipality in June 1983. Postal service from the Logan Lake post office began in August 1971.

== Present day ==
The town of Logan Lake consists of a small central commercial district with a Municipal Town Hall, Fire Hall, Royal Canadian Mounted Police (RCMP) Detachment, BC Ambulance Station, and Local Health Centre located along the main road (known as Meadow Creek Road or Highway 97D). Residential areas are situated on either side of the highway running through town.

The town boasts a small, but active, non-profit, all-volunteer, TV Society, which re-broadcasts 27 channels of Digital TV and 6 FM radio stations to the Logan Lake area. The system is run much like a small cable company, save that signals are broadcast over the air and payment for those services are made through property taxes.

The RCMP detachment has a staff of four including one detachment commander of Corporal rank, two general duty constables and one full time clerk. Traffic enforcement is also provided by district-level units based in the adjacent larger communities. The dispatch centre is in Kelowna. The BC Corps of Commissionaires provides guard services. Building and grounds maintenance services are contracted.

Logan Lake has two public schools; an elementary (kindergarten through grade 4) school (Logan Lake Elementary School) and a secondary (grade 5 through grade 12) school (Logan Lake Secondary School). The Elementary school sits near the commercial district adjacent to the Town Hall/Fire Hall and RCMP Detachment. The Secondary School is located in the south of the town and sits near a Ducks Unlimited Canada marsh site (locally known as "The Duck-Pond").

"Logan Lake" proper is a small lake located on Meadow Creek Road (Highway 97D) on the north end of the town. Logan Lake has a very muddy lake bed and is fed via rain, runoff, and small creeks. The lake is stocked with rainbow trout via a man-made spawning channel and barbless fishing is permitted with a catch of 1-3 fish per person depending on stock. Watercraft such as small boats and inflatable craft are popular. Fueled engines are not allowed on the lake, although electric engines are permitted. Boats can be launched from a dock at the north end of the lake which boasts a small campground for tents, trailers and fifth-wheels with some lots having electrical hookups. A nine-hole golf course is also located here.

The primary industry for the population is mining, with the Highland Valley Copper mine one of the largest employers for the town. Local services and employment in nearby Merritt and Kamloops are also important to the economy.

== Demographics ==
In the 2021 Census of Population conducted by Statistics Canada, Logan Lake had a population of 2,255 living in 1,064 of its 1,135 total private dwellings, a change of 13.1% from its 2016 population of 1,993. With a land area of 324.28 km^{2} (125.21 sq mi), it had a population density of 7.0/km^{2} (18.0/sq mi) in 2021.

=== Religion ===
According to the 2021 census, religious groups in Logan Lake included:

- Irreligion (1,410 persons or 62.5%)
- Christianity (840 persons or 37.3%)
