= Pavilion (disambiguation) =

A pavilion is a type of building.

Pavilion or Pavillion may also refer to:

== Places ==
=== United States ===
- Pavilion, New York, a town
  - Pavilion (CDP), New York, census-designated place within the town
- Pavillion, Wyoming, a town

=== Canada ===
- Pavilion, British Columbia, a ranching community and First Nations community
  - Pavilion Indian Band, a First Nations government in British Columbia
  - Pavilion Lake, a lake near Pavilion, British Columbia
  - Pavilion Mountain, a mountain in British Columbia

== Named structures ==
=== United Kingdom ===
- London Pavilion, a shopping arcade
- Royal Pavilion, a former royal residence in Brighton

=== United States ===
- The Pavilion (UC Davis), home to the UC Davis Aggies men's and women's basketball teams
- The Pavilion at Ole Miss, home to the Ole Miss Rebels men's and women's basketball teams
- The Pavilion (Scranton, Pennsylvania), an outdoor amphitheater within the Montage Mountain Ski Resort
- The Pavilion (Vermont), the principal workplace of the governor of Vermont
- Finneran Pavilion, formerly The Pavilion, home to the Villanova Wildcats men's and women's basketball teams
- Myrtle Beach Pavilion in Myrtle Beach, South Carolina

=== Elsewhere ===
- Pavilion Kuala Lumpur, a shopping mall in Kuala Lumpur, Malaysia
- Pavilion, Singapore, former Government House.
- The Pavilion (mall), a shopping mall in Westville, South Africa
- The Pavilion (Halifax), a former all-ages music venue

== Other uses ==
- "Pavilion" (song), by Eric Johnson from Venus Isle
- Pavilion (TV series), a 1967 Canadian travel documentary series
- Pavilion (co-working business club), a British business members' group
- Pavilion Books, a U.K. publisher imprint owned by Anova Books
- Pavilions (supermarket), a California supermarket chain owned by Albertsons
- Cricket pavilion, a building at a cricket ground
- HP Pavilion, Hewlett-Packard's brand name of computers and notebooks
- Umbraculum or the pavilion, an historic piece of the papal regalia and insignia
- The Pavilion, a play by Craig Wright
- Pavilion, the lower part of a faceted gemstone
- The Pavilion (2025), a 2025 Bosnian film by Dino Mustafić
- Pavilion, a physical space for networking and business operated by Hub Culture
- Pavilion (video game)

== See also ==
- Pavilion Theatre (disambiguation)
- Pavilions Shopping Centre (disambiguation)
- Pavillon (disambiguation)
