= Pavilion Mountain =

Mountain in British Columbia, Canada

- Location within British Columbia

Highest point
- Elevation: 2,089 m (6,854 ft)
- Prominence: 1,019 m (3,343 ft)
- Coordinates: 50°58′23″N 121°41′04″W

Geography
- Location: South Cariboo, South-Central Interior of British Columbia, Canada
- Parent range: Marble Range, SW Cariboo Plateau, Fraser Plateau, Interior Plateau

Pavilion Mountain is the highest summit of the southern Marble Range in the South Cariboo region of southwestern British Columbia. "Mount Carson", a subsidiary peak, was misapplied to the whole mountain 1957–1965, before the well-established local name was restored. Pavilion Creek is to the south. Pavilion Lake and Marble Canyon are to the southeast.

== First Nations ==
First Nations came far from various directions to the mountain, where gradual slopes provided easy access. One such travel corridor was through the Marble Canyon. Hunting, especially of deer, was popular. At the higher elevations, visitors gathered plants for food. The indigenous people later also obtained employment at the ranches that were established.

== Name origins ==
The Ts'kw'aylaxw First Nation resides to the southwest at Pavilion, the name source. Robert Carson was a well-known pioneer rancher on the mountain. "Mount Carson" (elevation: 2,005 metres (6,578 ft); prominence: 120 metres (394 ft)) is southeast of the main peak.

== Trails and roads ==
The Fraser Canyon Gold Rush began in 1858. The trail northward from Lillooet branched in the vicinity of Pavilion. One route went northward over the mountain, the other eastward around the base of the mountain via Marble Canyon and the Bonaparte River.

In 1862, Sgt. Major John McMurphy of the Royal Engineers built the Old Cariboo Road northward over Pavilion Mountain to access the Cariboo goldfields. The mountain work was performed by contractors who employed about 250 men. The still existing zigzag down the north side is so steep that a log would be dragged behind wagon traffic to provide additional braking.

In 1885, a 35.8-kilometre (22.25 mi) wagon road was built via the Marble Canyon and Hat Creek to the Cariboo Trunk Road. By the early 1890s, the regular Ashcroft–Lillooet stage service changed at Clinton and routed over Pavilion Mountain, However, stages also took the Marble Canyon route, which would become BC Highway 99.

The mountain road remains unpaved. From a junction at the road summit, a side road follows the spine of the mountain to the peak, which is the site of a restored fire lookout cabin and microwave transmission tower.

== Ranching ==
Although earlier settlers inhabited the mountain, Robert Carson, who bought land in 1867, was the first permanent resident. He built a log house at 26 Mile, which became a stage stop. He eventually won a feud with another rancher over water rights. Over the years, Carson bought out other ranchers to create "Carson's Kingdom", a description used in a Bruce Hutchison book. Carson put in his own road down to High Bar.

The Pavilion Mountain ranchland stayed in the Carson family until 1942 when Colonel Victor Spencer purchased the spread. In 1949, Spencer acquired the Bryson Ranch, comprising land on the mountain and in the valley below. The combined Carson and Bryson holdings became the "Diamond S Ranch". Frank Armes managed the day-to-day ranch operations. Spencer, often accompanied by influential guests, would hunt and fish while visiting. Following Spencer's death in 1960, Ted Termuende purchased the ranch. Comprising about 6,100 hectares (15,000 acres), the Blue Goose Cattle Company became the new owners in 2013.

== Notable people ==
- Robert Henry Carson (1885–1971), politician, was born and raised on the family ranch.
- Ernest Crawford Carson (1894–1952), politician, was born and raised on the family ranch.
