= Marble Canyon Indian Reserve No. 3 =

Coordinates: 50°49′00″N 121°40′00″W

Marble Canyon 3, properly and most commonly referred to as Marble Canyon Indian Reserve No. 3, is an Indian reserve of the Ts'kw'aylaxw First Nation (Pavilion Indian Band), located at the southeast end of Marble Canyon, adjacent to BC Highway 99 just northwest of the Upper Hat Creek junction, which is about midway between the towns of Lillooet and Cache Creek. The main reserve of the Tx'kw'ylaxw is Pavilion Indian Reserve No. 1, located at the community of Pavilion, which lies at the northwest end of Marble Canyon, which is to say at the opening of the valley of Pavilion Creek into the Fraser Canyon.

The reserve has a small rancherie, or residential area, and a rodeo grounds used for the Marble Canyon Rodeo. Many band members work at the lime mine operated by Graymont Western Canada Inc. nearby.

== See also ==
- List of Indian Reserves in Canada#British Columbia
