= Bonaparte Indian Band =

First Nation in British Columbia, Canada

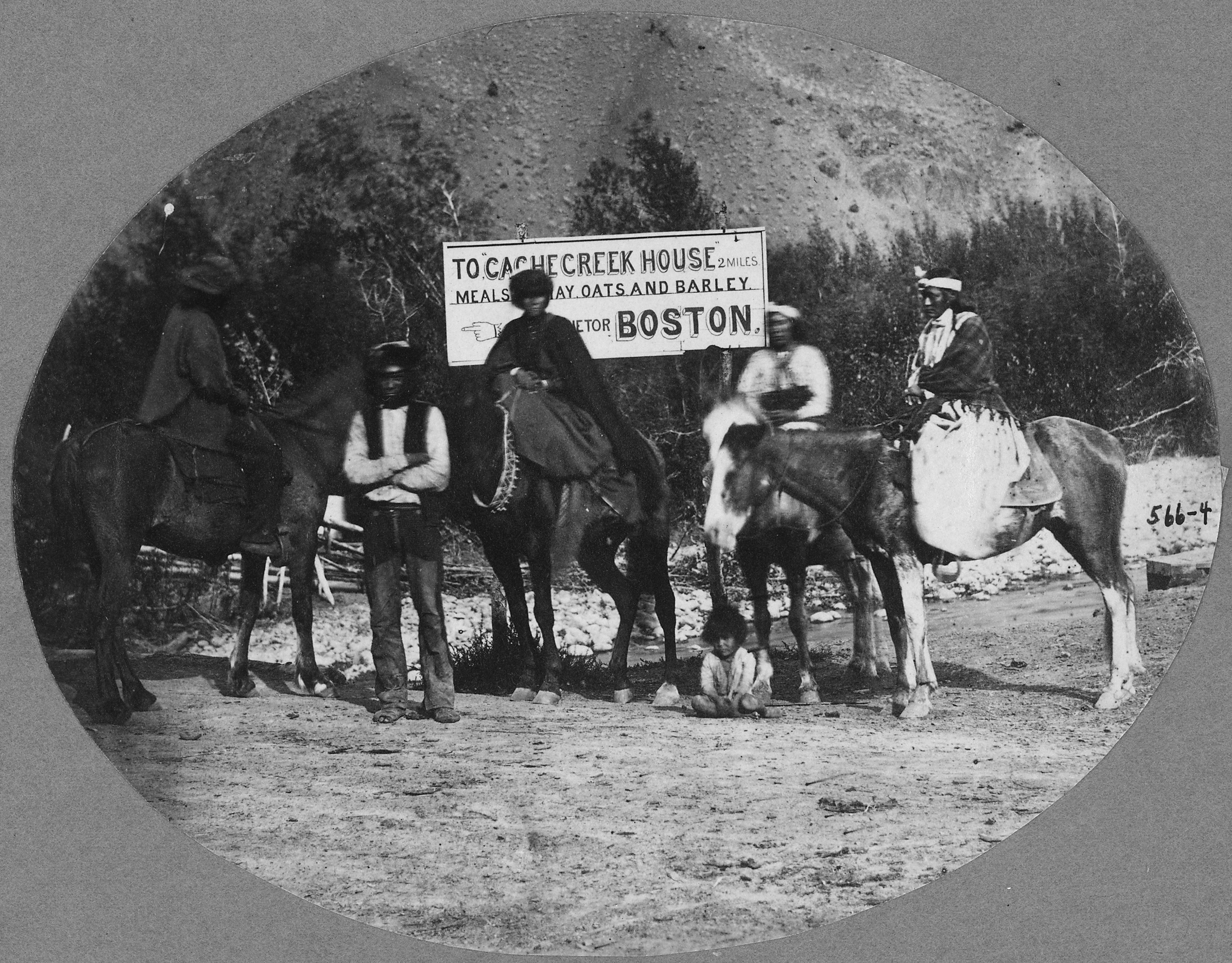
Heritage photograph of Bonaparte members

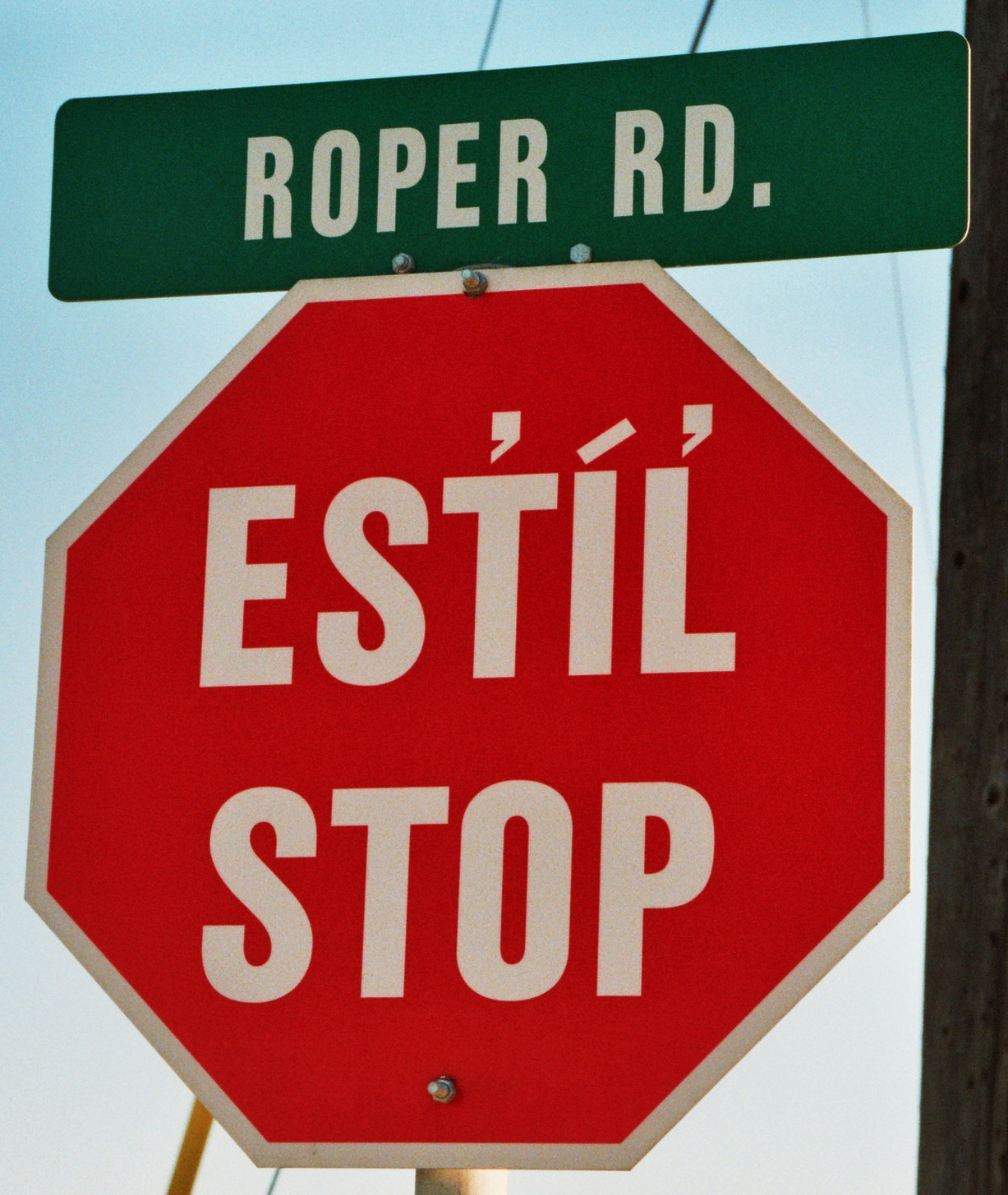
A stop sign in both English and Secwepemctsín (Shuswap) on the Bonaparte/Stuctwesemc Reserve.

Bonaparte Indian Band a.k.a. Bonaparte First Nation, is a member band of the Shuswap Nation Tribal Council of the Secwepemc (Shuswap) people.

== Indian Reserves and communities ==
The band's main community is on the Bonaparte Indian Reserve No. 3, located 50°51′00″N 121°22′00″W comprising 704 ha., usually known as the Bonaparte Reserve, between Cache Creek and the terminus of Highway 99 at the Hat Creek Ranch or Lower Hat Creek (a.k.a. Carquile), Some band members work as guides, interpreters and wranglers for the Hat Creek Ranch, which is a heritage museum/restoration of a roadhouse of the Cariboo Wagon Road and had been the homestead of Donald McLean, former Chief Trader at Fort Kamloops and one of the combatants and casualties of the Chilcotin War of 1864.

Other reserves are:

- Lower Hat Creek 2, 31.6 ha., on Hat Creek between Marble Canyon and that creek's confluence with the Bonaparte River (not to be confused with Lower Hat Creek, or Carquile, which is at the confluence of the creek and the river). 50°53′00″N 121°30′00″W
- Grasslands 7, 207.6 ha., at McLean Lake, in the Trachyte Hills northwest of Cache Creek 50°48′00″N 121°24′00″W
- Hihium Lake 6 (Shared between Upper Nicola, Lower Nicola, Bonaparte, and Tk’emlúps te Secwépemc Bands), 31.6 ha. 51°04′00″N 121°09′00″W
- Hihium Lake 6A (Shared between the Skeetchestn and Bonaparte Bands), on north shore of Hihium Lake near NE corner of Hihium Lake Indian Reserve No. 6, 2.10 ha.51°04′00″N 121°09′00″W
- Hihium Lake 6B (Shared between the Skeetchestn and Bonaparte Bands), on south shore of Hihium Lake, near its east end, 2.0 ha. 51°03′00″N 121°05′00″W
- Loon Lake 4, 24.6 ha., at Loon Lake 51°05′00″N 121°20′00″W
- Mauvais Rocher 5, 40.2 ha., on the Thompson River to the east of Ashcroft 50°47′00″N 121°05′00″W
- Upper Hat Creek 1, 835.3 ha., on Hat Creek to the southeast of Marble Canyon and north of the locality of Upper Hat Creek. 50°49′00″N 121°35′00″W

The reserves were created when the government of the Colony of British Columbia, without negotiation or consent of the First nations, and without legally extinguishing First Nations claim to the land, established an Indian reserve system in the 1860s.

== Population ==
Bonaparte Indian Band are also called ""Stuctwesemc" in Secwepemctsín, which means "people of the Valley" (also spelled St'uxwtews). The band population is 815, with 584 living off-reserve.
