= Cache Creek (British Columbia) =

Stream in British Columbia, Canada

Coordinates: 50°49′00″N 121°20′00″W

Cache Creek, originally Rivière de la Cache, is a tributary of the Bonaparte River in the Thompson Country of the Interior of British Columbia, Canada, joining that river at the town of Cache Creek, British Columbia, which is located at the junction of the Trans-Canada and Cariboo Highways.

Approximately 20 kilometres in length, the stream rises in the Arrowstone Hills to the northeast of the town and runs southwest to its confluence with the Bonaparte at the town of Cache Creek.

== See also ==
- List of rivers of British Columbia
- Elephant Hill Provincial Park
- Hat Creek (British Columbia)
