= Edge Hills Provincial Park =

Provincial park in British Columbia

- IUCN category II (national park)
- Location within British Columbia
- Interactive map of Edge Hills Provincial Park
- Location: Lillooet Land District, British Columbia, Canada
- Nearest city: Clinton, BC
- Coordinates: 51°02′12″N 121°51′51″W
- Area: 11,882 ha (29,360 acres)
- Established: July 13, 1995
- Governing body: BC Parks

Edge Hills Provincial Park is a provincial park in British Columbia, Canada, located west of the town of Clinton. The Edge Hills flank the wall of the Fraser Canyon north of Moran Canyon and form a small fore-range between the river and the higher Marble Range just east. Access to the Edge Hills is via the Jesmond Road, which cuts north off the Pavilion Mountain Road at Kelly Lake. A spur road from the Jesmond Road west goes to an overlook atop the Edge Hills, known as Cougar Point.

Edge Hills Provincial Park is renowned for the spectacular sights of river canyons, forests, and grasslands. This diversity in landscape and vegetation is home to numerous wildlife species.

Edge Hills Provincial Park is undeveloped. The wildlife in the park flourishes in part because of this. Although the park offers hiking, horseback riding and wildlife viewing opportunities, most of the trails are unmarked and not maintained. Visitors have more facilities for camping in the nearby parks such as Big Bar Lake, Downing, and Green Lake Provincial Parks.

== See also ==
- Marble Range Provincial Park
- Jesmond, British Columbia
