= Kelly Lake =

Kelly Lake may refer to:

- Kelly Lake (Florida), a lake in Lakeland, Florida
- Kelly Lake, a lake in Carver County, Minnesota
- Kelly Lake, a lake in Rice County, Minnesota
- Kelly Lake (Annapolis), a lake in Annapolis County, Nova Scotia
- Kelly Lake (Eastern Shore), a lake in Halifax Regional Municipality, Nova Scotia
- Kelly Lake (Enfield), a lake in Halifax Regional Municipality, Nova Scotia
- Kelly Lake (Guysborough), a lake in Guysborough District, Nova Scotia
- Kelly Lake, a lake in Oconto County, Wisconsin
- Kelly Lake, any one of four lakes in British Columbia, Canada, including:
  - Kelly Lake, British Columbia, located just east of the lake in the Peace River Country of the province's northeast
  - Kelly Lake, the centrepiece of Downing Provincial Park in the province's South Cariboo region, just east of the town of Clinton
- Kelly Lake (Renfrew County), Ontario
- Kelly Lake (Greater Sudbury), Ontario
- Kelly Lake (Sothman Township, Sudbury District), Ontario
- Kelly Lake (McNish Township, Sudbury District), Ontario
- Kelly Lake (Thunder Bay District), Ontario
- Kelly Lake (Kenora District), Ontario
- Kelly Lake (York Region), Ontario
- Kelly Lake (Algoma District), Ontario
- Kelly Lake (Nipissing District), Ontario
- Kelly Lake (Simcoe County), Ontario
- Kelly Lake (Haliburton County), Ontario
- Kelly Lake, a lake near Watsonville in Santa Cruz County, California
