= Elephant Hill fire =

2017 wildfire in British Columbia, Canada

Elephant Hill wildfire
- Part of 2017 British Columbia wildfires
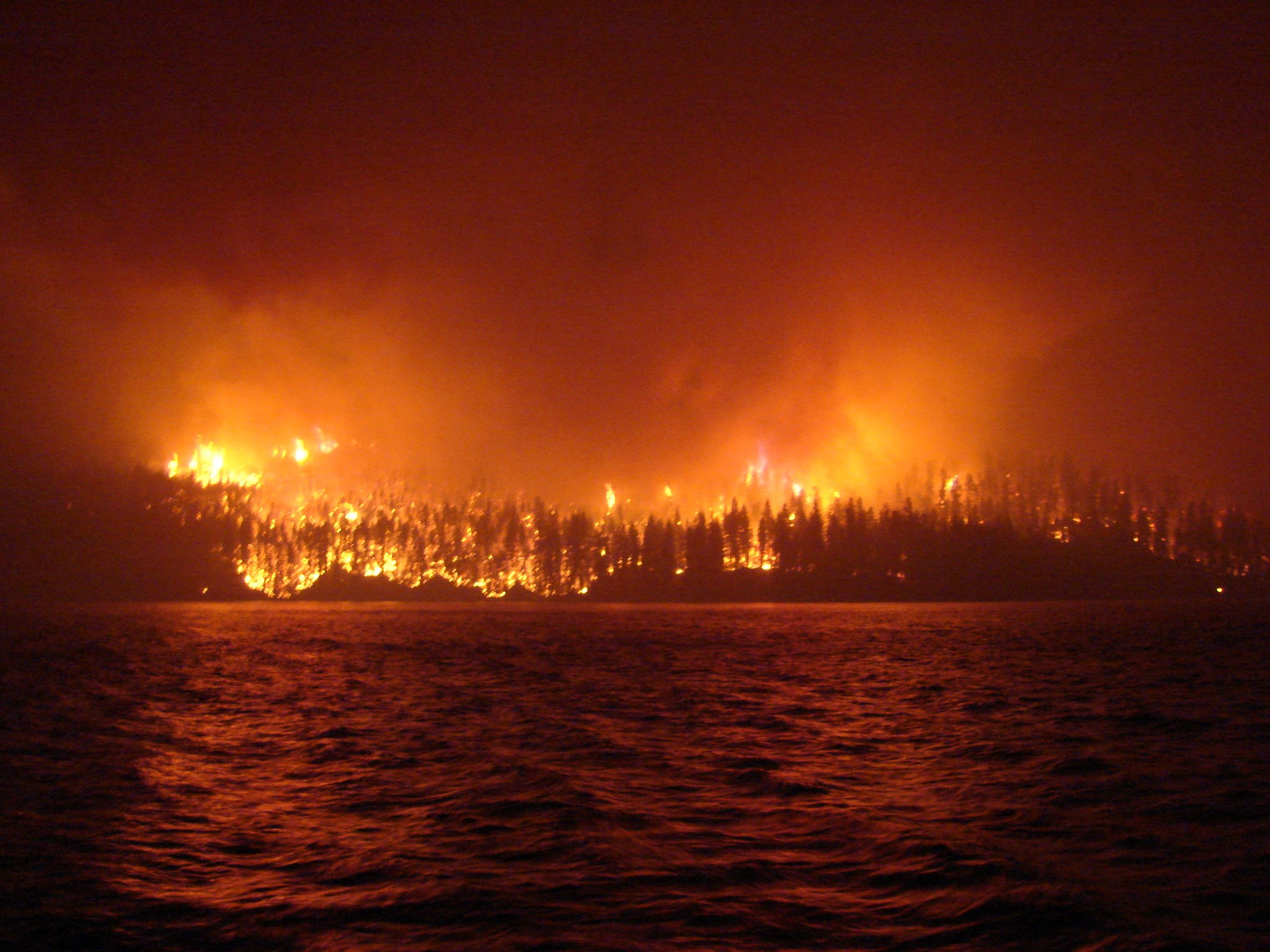
- Fire on the shores of Loon Lake
- Date: July 6, 2017 – September 27, 2017

Statistics
- Total area: 191,865 hectares

Impacts
- Structures lost: ~123
- Cost: 29 million CAD

The Elephant Hill fire was a wildfire in the Canadian province of British Columbia in 2017. It burned 191,865 hectares (474,110 acres) of land near the town of Cache Creek in the province's Interior region. The fire destroyed several communities, burned at least 123 structures, and caused ongoing flooding problems in the region.

== Background ==
The 2017 fire season in B.C. was, at the time, the most destructive in terms of area burned in the province's history. The Interior region saw high temperatures throughout the month of June, increasing the fire risk. The area had been severely affected by the mountain pine beetle epidemic, which had killed off significant amounts of lodgepole pine. This resulted in a very high Build-Up Index, a measure of available flammable material in forest areas.

== Ignition and spread ==
The fire was reported on July 6 near the town of Ashcroft. It was initially named the Ashcroft Reserve fire. A fire-cause investigation conducted by the provincial government determined that the fire was human-caused, likely sparked by "smoking or smoking materials". In the first 24 hours after detection, the fire expanded to 1,000 hectares (2,500 acres). Much of the structure loss happened during this period. The Boston Flats community, located between Ashcroft and Cache Creek, was mostly destroyed.

The fire spread northward into Elephant Hill Provincial Park and the Bonaparte Plateau. The fire threatened the Bonaparte Indian Band Reserve #3, north of Cache Creek. More structure loss occurred at Loon Lake and Pressy Lake. The entire town of Cache Creek was placed on evacuation order from July 7th until July 18th.

In late July, the fire had a second large expansion, moving northwards and threatening the town of Clinton. The fire was not listed as "under control" until September 27.

== Impacts ==
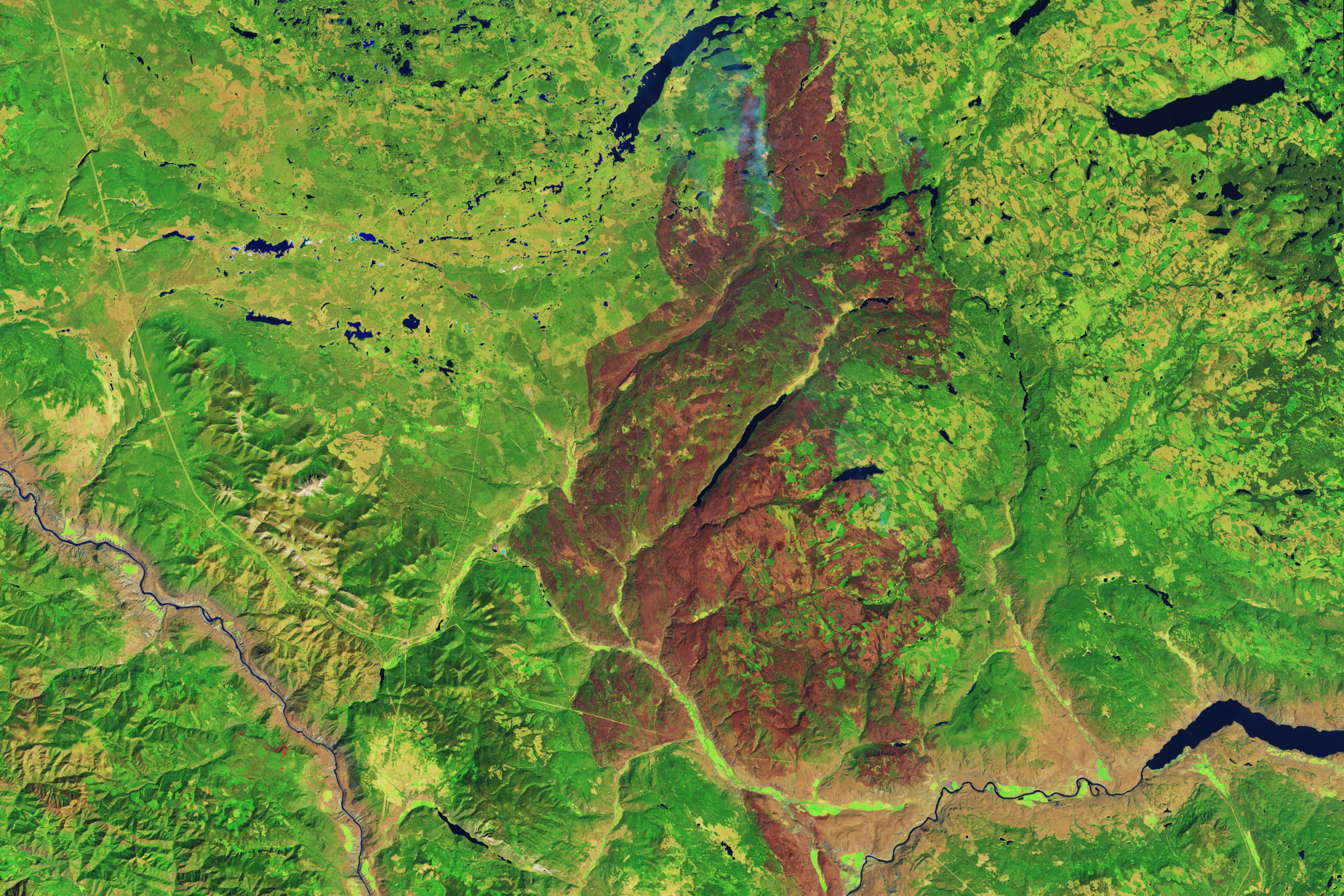
Burn scar of fire in August 2017

In total, the fire consumed at least 123 structures. Insured damages were in the range of 29 million Canadian dollars, according to the Insurance Bureau of Canada. The Ashcroft Indian Band suffered major losses of property from the fire. 12 of 32 structures were destroyed . The nearby Boston Flats trailer park was also heavily hit with only three of the 51 homes spared by the fire. At Loon Lake, 60 buildings were burned, as well as the community fire hall.

The fire destroyed the forest in one-third of the watershed of the Bonaparte River. The burned areas have much lower soil stability, leading to destructive landslides and flash flooding. Persistent flooding in the town of Cache Creek has been linked to the fire. A study from the University of British Columbia found that erosion on the river increased by 230% after the fire, and that the stream bed had widened by 130%. Silt from the erosion damaged spawning areas for salmon and trout.

The Secwépemc First Nations in the region formed the Secwepemcùl’ecw Restoration and Stewardship Society in 2019 to organize recovery activities in the areas affected by the Elephant Hill fire. The group partnered with local communities, the provincial government, and environmental non-profits to restore riparian zones, plant hundreds of thousands of trees, and monitor ecological recovery after the fire. The Society estimated the economic, cultural and environmental damage caused by the fire to be between 500 million to 1 billion CAD per year. This estimate included water quality impacts, flooding, loss of timber resources, loss of carbon sequestration, and the societal impacts of lost homes and evacuations.
