= Cascade Mountains leeward forests =

Temperate coniferous forest ecoregion in North America

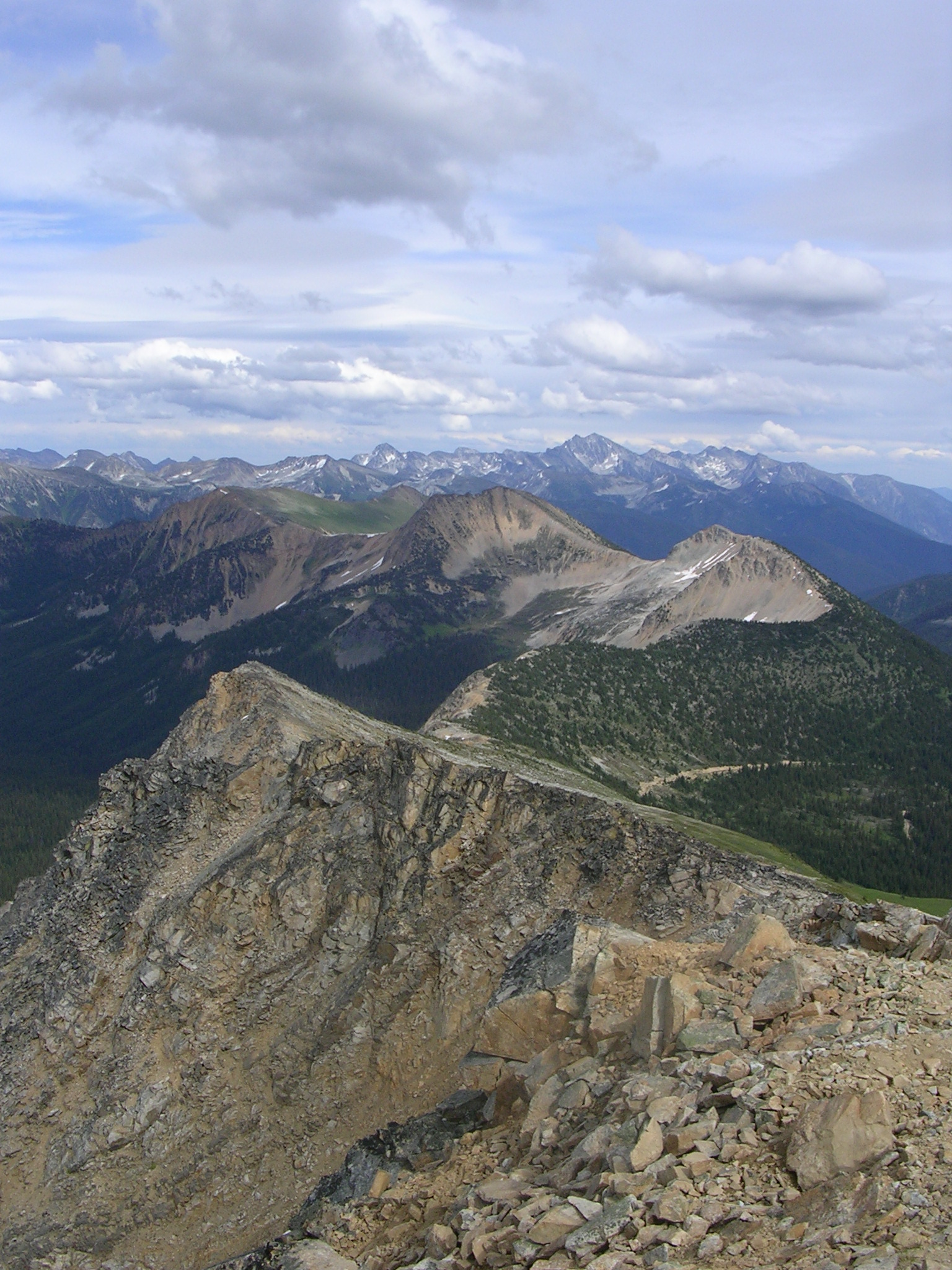
- Stein Valley Nlaka'pamux Heritage Park

Ecology
- Realm: Nearctic
- Biome: Temperate coniferous forests
- Borders: List: British Columbia mainland coastal forests; Central and Southern Cascades forests; Eastern Cascades forests; Fraser Plateau and Basin complex; Okanagan dry forests; Palouse grasslands
- Bird species: 187
- Mammal species: 81

Geography
- Area: 46,300 km^{2} (17,900 mi^{2})
- Countries: Canada; United States
- States: British Columbia; Washington

Conservation
- Conservation status: Relatively Stable/Intact
- Habitat loss: 67.07%
- Protected: 43.48%

The Cascade Mountains leeward forests are a temperate coniferous forest ecoregion of North America, as defined by the World Wildlife Fund (WWF) categorization system.

== Setting ==
This is a band of mountain habitat running north–south along the leeward side of the Cascade Mountains in British Columbia, Canada and Washington, United States, with the Okanagan Highland to the south on the US-Canada border and the Chilcotin Ranges to the north.

This is a varied mountain landscape of rugged, snowy peaks, glaciers and alpine meadows. In the southern ranges the temperature varies from 15 °C (59 °F) in summer to −3.5 °C (26 °F) in winter with the northern ranges 2–3 °C (4–5 °F) cooler.

== Flora ==
Higher elevation subalpine slopes are home to Engelmann spruce (Picea engelmannii), subalpine fir (Abies lasiocarpa) and lodgepole pine (Pinus contorta) while lower montane forests consist of lodgepole pine, quaking aspen (Populus tremuloides), white spruce (Picea glauca) and Rocky Mountain Douglas-fir.

== Fauna ==
Wildlife of the mountains includes bighorn sheep (Ovis canadensis), mountain goat (Oreamnos americanus), grizzly bear (Ursus arctos) and black bear (Ursus americanus), black-tailed deer (Odocoileus hemionus), coyote (Canis latrans) and cougar (Puma concolor couguar) with smaller mammals such as the northern flying squirrel. The birds include spotted owl, dusky grouse (Dendragapus obscurus) and a number of birds of prey. The Fraser River is particularly important for salmon and also acts as a barrier to the movement of wildlife within the region.

== Threats and preservation ==
Most of this forest is still intact although threatened by logging, mining and other human intervention. Large blocks of intact forest include North Cascades National Park in Washington and the following areas of British Columbia; Big Creek Provincial Park and Spruce Lake Protected Area, the Stein Valley Nlaka'pamux Heritage Park, E. C. Manning Provincial Park, Tsʼilʔos Provincial Park, Cathedral Provincial Park and Protected Area, Skagit Valley Provincial Park, Marble Range Provincial Park, Cascade Recreation Area and Edge Hills Provincial Park near Fraser Canyon.

== See also ==
- List of ecoregions in Canada (WWF)
- List of ecoregions in the United States (WWF)
