= Chimney Rock (Canada) =

Limestone formation in British Columbia, Canada

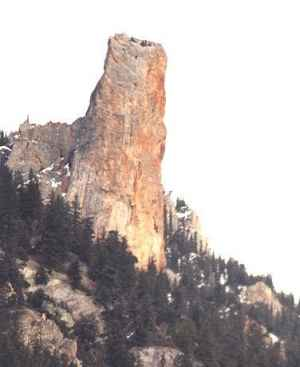
- Chimney Rock from the northwest

Highest point
- Elevation: 1,725 m (5,659 ft)
- Prominence: 45 m (148 ft)
- Listing: Mountains of British Columbia
- Coordinates: 50°52′42″N 121°43′14″W

Geography
- Location: British Columbia, Canada
- Parent range: Marble Range
- Topo map: NTS 92I13 Pavilion

Climbing
- First ascent: 1957 Hank Mather; Elfida Pigou

Chimney Rock is a limestone formation in Marble Canyon, midway between the towns of Lillooet and Cache Creek in British Columbia, Canada. It is located within Marble Canyon Provincial Park.

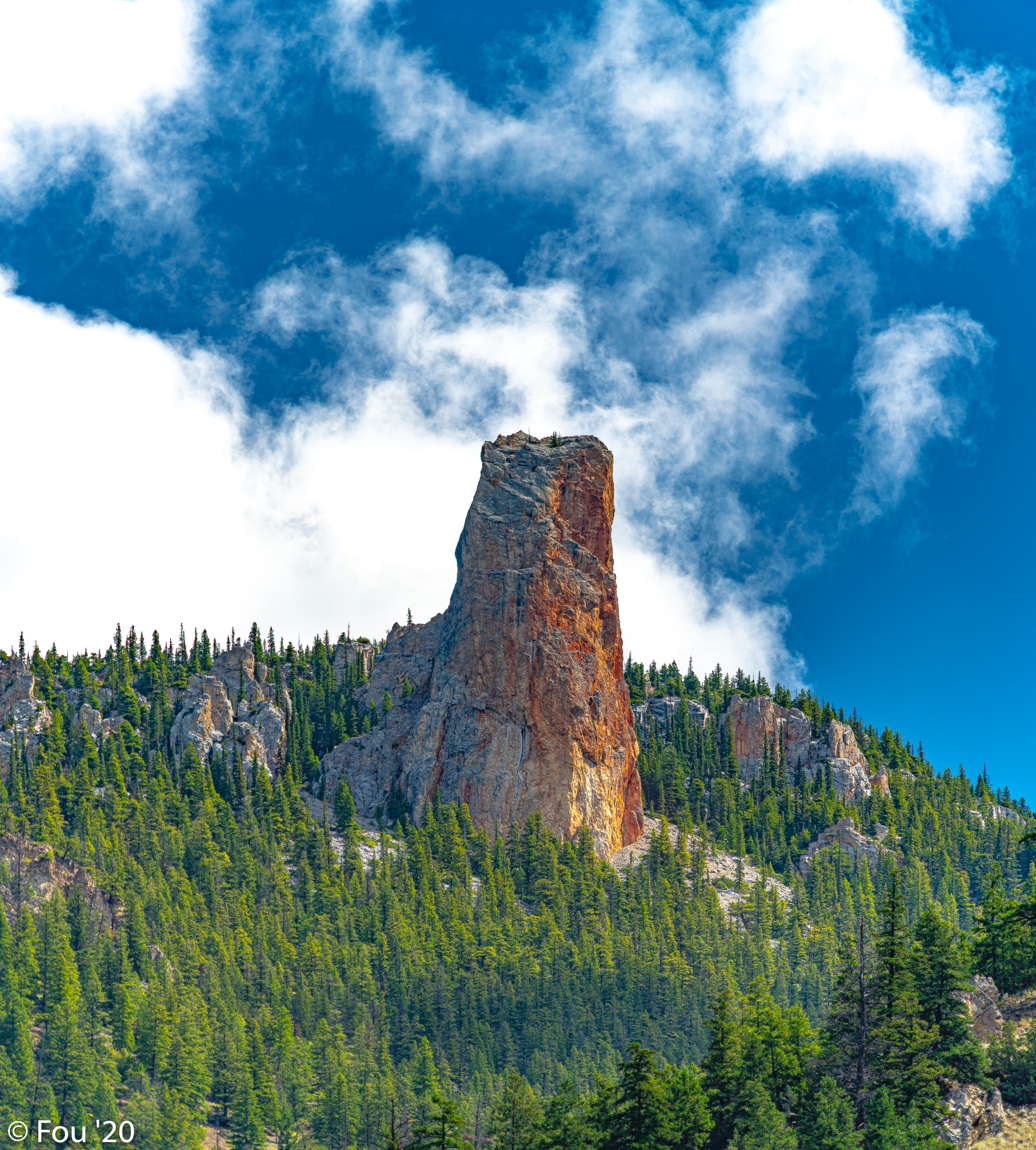
Chimney Rock
