= Marble Range Provincial Park =

Provincial park in British Columbia

- IUCN category II (national park)
- Location within British Columbia
- Interactive map of Marble Range Provincial Park
- Location: British Columbia, Canada
- Nearest city: Clinton
- Coordinates: 51°11′29″N 121°49′59″W
- Area: 192.36 km^{2} (74.27 sq mi)
- Established: March 8, 1990
- Governing body: BC Parks

Marble Range Provincial Park is a provincial park in British Columbia, Canada, located west of 100 Mile House and Clinton at the southwest edge of the Cariboo Plateau along the eastern edge of the Fraser Canyon south from Big Bar-Kostering and near Jesmond.

== See also ==
- Edge Hills Provincial Park
- Marble Canyon Provincial Park
