= Pavilion Lake =

Lake in British Columbia, Canada

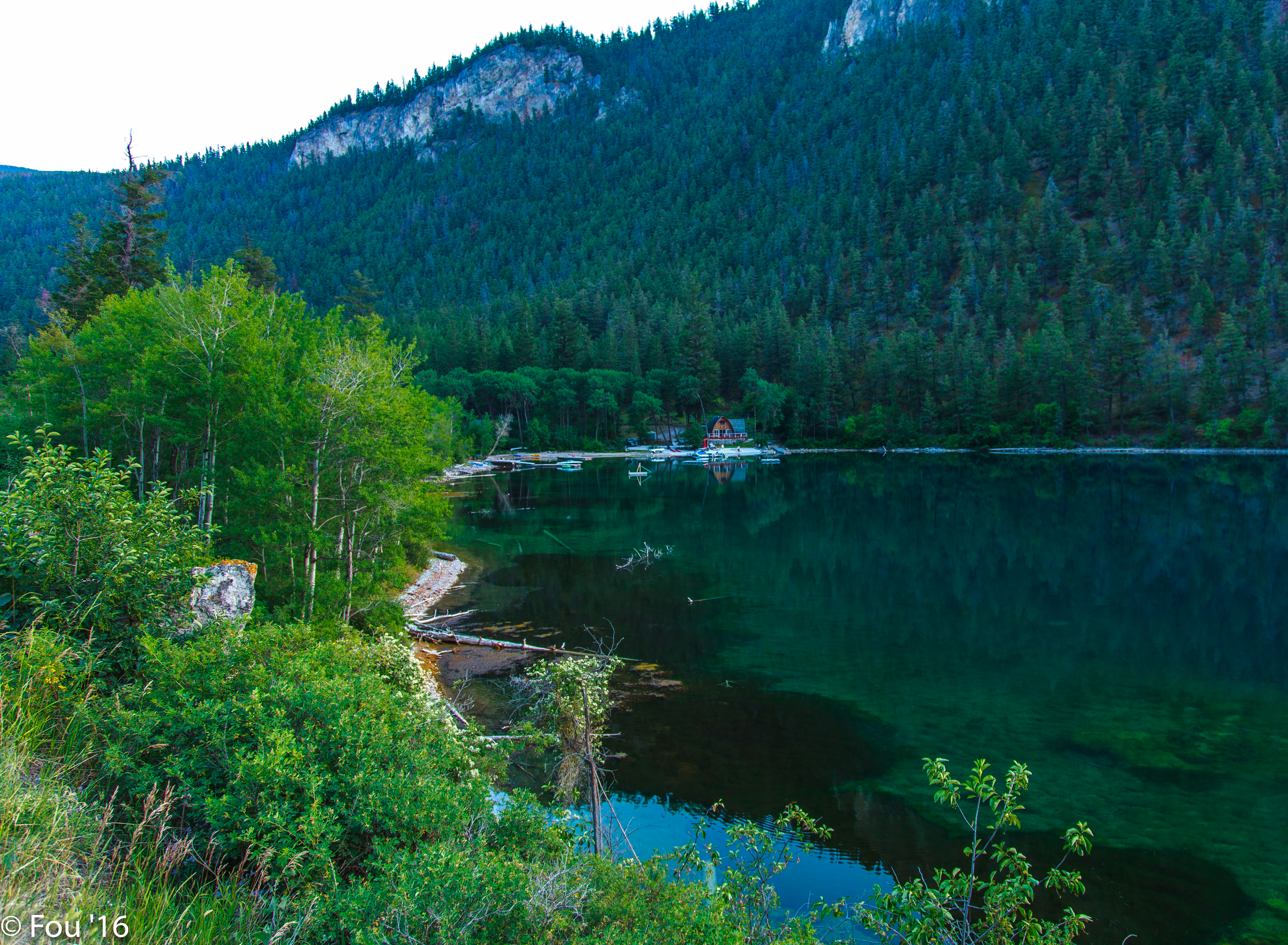
- A surface view of Pavilion Lake

- Location within British Columbia
- Location: British Columbia
- Coordinates: 50.86677°N 121.74191°W
- Primary outflows: Pavilion Creek
- Basin countries: Canada
- Max. length: 5.8 kilometers (3.6 mi)
- Max. width: 0.8 kilometers (0.50 mi)
- Max. depth: 65 meters (213 ft)
- Surface elevation: 820 meters (2,690 ft)

Pavilion Lake is a freshwater lake located in Marble Canyon, British Columbia, Canada home to colonies of freshwater microbialites.

== Location and local communities ==
It is located between the towns of Lillooet and Cache Creek (29.44 kilometres WNW, as the crow flies, from Cache Creek) and lies along BC Highway 99, 8.85 highway kilometres (northeast then southeast) from Pavilion, British Columbia. There is a small community of lakeshore residences, some recreational and seasonal only, located on the lake's eastern shore adjacent to the highway. The lake is overlooked by the cliffs of Marble Canyon, which is the southern buttress of the Marble Range, and the forests of the northernmost Clear Range. Also overlooking the lake is Chimney Rock (K'lpalekw in Secwepemc'tsn, "Coyote's Penis"), which like the lake and the canyon have spiritual significance to the adjoining native communities, the Tskwaylaxw people of Pavilion and the Bonaparte band of Secwepemc at Upper Hat Creek. One of the rancheries and a rodeo and pow-wow ground of the Pavilion Band is located at Marble Canyon's south entrance. The lake area and its foreshore were added to Marble Canyon Provincial Park in order to protect its special scientific and heritage values.

== Characteristics ==
The lake demonstrates karst hydrology, with underground inflows from Marble Canyon creeks. The lake has generally low biological productivity, and is classified as ultraoligotrophic. It also features a high degree of water clarity. The lake gets covered with ice annually, and is dimictic, going through two thermal overturns per year. The lake reaches a maximum depth of 65 meters below the surface. It is also a hard water lake, due to its high mineral content.

== Microbialites and scientific research ==
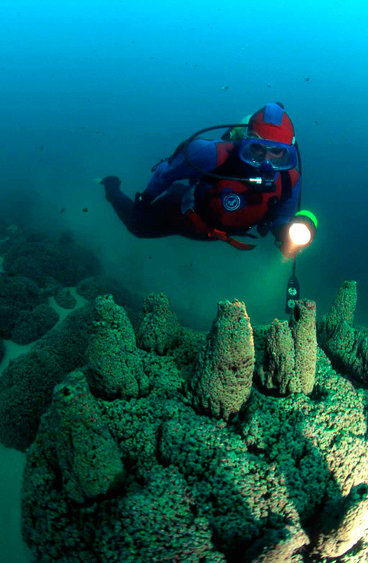
Microbialite towers with NASA diver, 50 - 60 feet deep in Pavilion Lake.

Part of a karst formation, the lake is most notable for being home to colonies of microbialites, a type of stromatolite. Colonies of microbialites grow from depths of 5 to 55 meters. Low sedimentation rates may allow for continued development of these colonies. One estimate puts microbialite growth at 0.05 mm per year within the last 1,000 years. Research at Pavilion Lake has suggested that most biological activity in microbialite structures occurs near the surface of these structures. The lake's harsh geochemical environment prevents the development of metazoan grazers, also allowing for microbialite development.

The lake has been the subject of astrobiology research by NASA, the Canadian Space Agency, and research institutions from around the world. The research falls under the umbrella of the Pavilion Lake Research Project. The Pavilion Lake Research Project has used the site to help train Canadian Space Agency astronauts.

== See also ==
- List of lakes of British Columbia
- Fraser Canyon
- Fountain, British Columbia
- Marble Canyon
- Pavilion Indian Band (Tskwalaxw First Nation)
