= Cache Creek Ocean =

Inferred ancient ocean which existed between western North America and several terranes

The Cache Creek Ocean, formerly called Anvil Ocean, is an inferred ancient ocean which existed between western North America and offshore continental terranes between the Devonian and the Middle Jurassic.

== Evolution of the concept ==
First proposed in the 1970s and referred to as the Anvil Ocean, the oceanic crust between the Yukon composite terranes and North America was later updated to Cache Creek Sea in 1987 Monger and Berg, before being renamed the Cache Creek Ocean by Plafker and Berg in 1994. Other researchers in 1998 proposed the name Slide Mountain Ocean.

The geology of Yukon and geology of Alaska formed in part due to the accretion of island arcs and continental terranes onto the western margin of North America. Many of these island arcs arrived onshore during and after the Devonian. The Cache Creek Belt (also referred to as the Cache Creek suture zone or Cache Creek terrane) is an extensive area of mélange and oceanic rocks in the Canadian province of British Columbia. Sedimentary rocks contain fossils from the Carboniferous through the Middle Jurassic and isotopic dating of blueschist gives ages 230 and 210 million years ago in the Late Triassic.

The Cache Creek Belt is bordered by the Quesnellia Terrane in the east and by the large Stikinia Terrane in the west. The accretion of the landmasses and the closing the Cache Creek Ocean likely happened in the Middle Jurassic.
