= Chasm Provincial Park =

Provincial park in British Columbia, Canada

- IUCN category III (natural monument or feature)
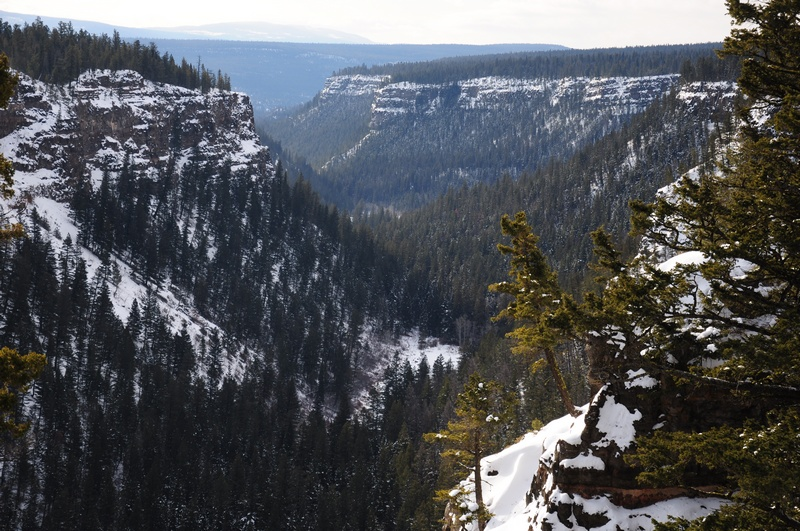
- The Great Chasm near Clinton, reflecting 10 million years of erosion

- Location within British Columbia
- Interactive map of Chasm Provincial Park
- Location: Thompson-Nicola RD, British Columbia, Canada
- Nearest town: Clinton
- Coordinates: 51°10′45″N 121°26′15″W
- Area: 3,145 ha (12.14 sq mi)
- Established: May 17 1940
- Operator: BC Parks

Chasm Provincial Park is a provincial park in British Columbia, Canada, located near the town of Clinton. Expanded to 3,067 hectares (7,580 acres) in 1995, the park was originally created in 1940 to preserve and promote a feature known as the Painted Chasm, or simply The Chasm, a gorge created from melting glacial waters eroding a lava plateau over a 10 million year span called the Chilcotin Group.

The walls of the Chasm contain tones of red, brown yellow, and purple and are an average of 300 metres (980 ft) in height. The Chasm is approximately 600 metres (2,000 ft) wide and 8 kilometres (5.0 mi) long, and lies adjacent to the route of the Cariboo Road, which lines the northern apex of the Chasm alongside the Canadian National Railway line. In addition to the park upland areas of ponderosa pine, marshes and lakes are included in the park's boundaries.

== Wildlife ==
Wildlife found in the park includes bighorn sheep, moose, mule deer, black bear, coyote, small mammals, songbirds and birds of prey.

== Images ==
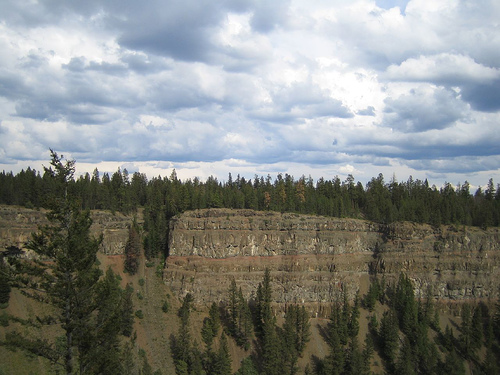
Multiple flood basalt flows and trees in Chasm Provincial Park

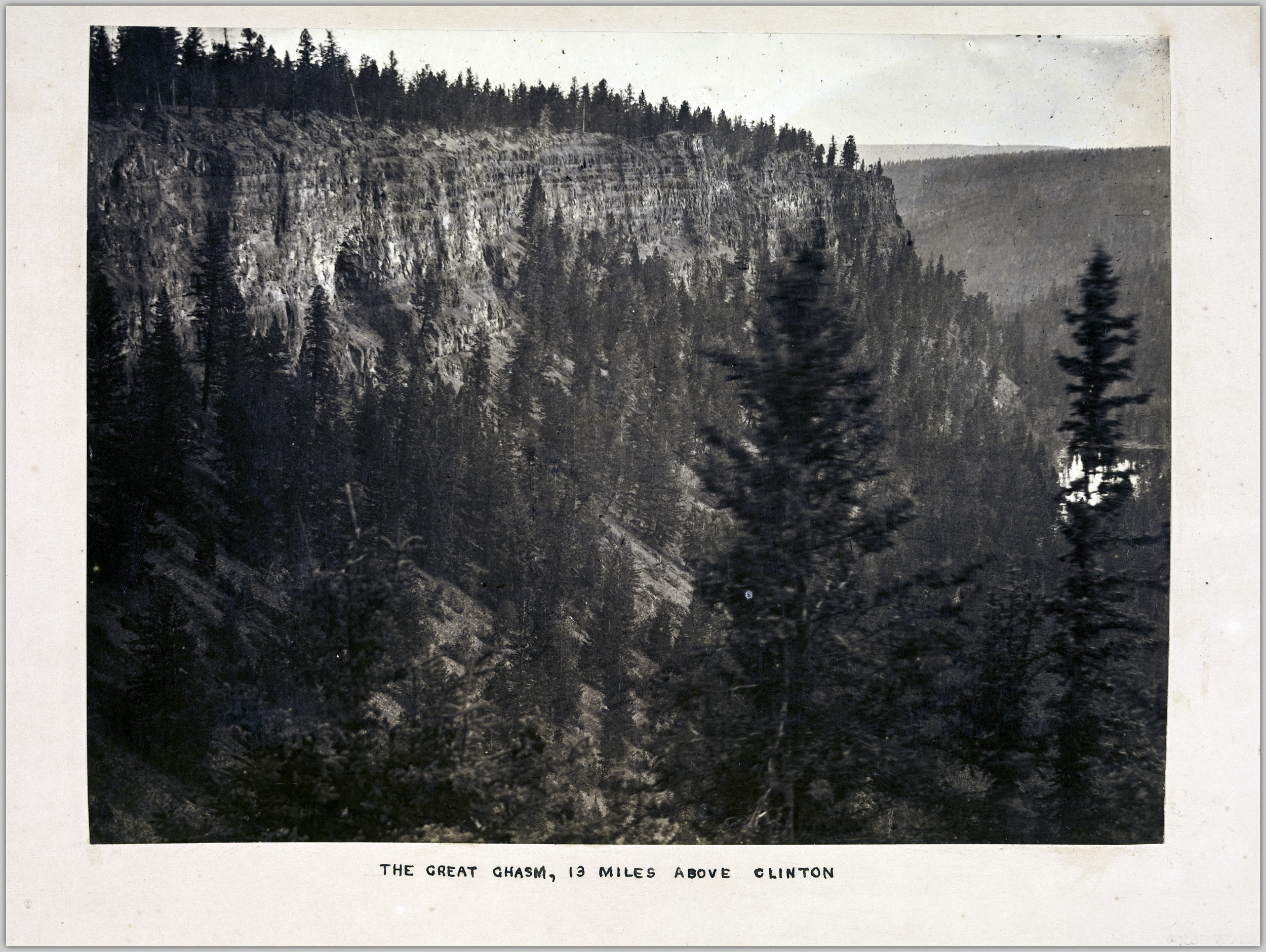
The Great Chasm in 1867, by Frederick Dally
