= Loon Lake (Lillooet Land District, British Columbia) =

Lake in Cache Creek, British Columbia, Canada

- Location within British Columbia Location within Canada
- Location: Thompson-Nicola Regional District, British Columbia
- Coordinates: 51°06′12″N 121°15′12″W
- Primary inflows: Loon Creek
- Primary outflows: Loon Creek
- Basin countries: Canada
- Max. length: 14 km (8.7 mi)
- Surface area: 693.6 ha (1,714 acres)
- Max. depth: 64.9 m (213 ft)
- Surface elevation: 817 m (2,680 ft)

Loon Lake is a 693.6-hectare (1,714-acre) lake north of Cache Creek in British Columbia, Canada. The lake is in the Thompson-Nicola Regional District on the Thompson Plateau. On the northern shore is the small community of Loon Lake. Access to Loon Lake and its amenities is from Loon Lake Road, which is off Highway 97.

In July of 2017, infrastructure surrounding the lake was damaged by the Elephant Hill wildfire.

== Description ==
Loon Lake is located in the Lillooet Land District and local government is provided by the Thompson-Nicola Regional District. Its west shore has been developed with resorts, permanent homes, and summer residences, as well as some development of the east shore, accessible only by water.

Loon Lake is a long, deep lake in a steep valley. Its inflow and outflow is Loon Creek. To the north and west is the Bonaparte Plateau and to the south are the Arrowstone Hills.

Rainbow trout and freshwater shrimp are found in the lake.

== Loon Lake community ==
On the northern shore is the small community of Loon Lake. Alongside the community, there are several resorts and campgrounds. Sevices include stores, boat rentals, gas and propane, RV parking, and camping. There is a public boat launch at the east end of the lake. Loon Lake has approximately 200 permanent residents, with the population swelling to over 1,000 in peak holiday season.

A forest fire in July of 2017 damaged buildings in the nearby community and destroyed others.

=== History ===
The oldest operating resort is the Evergreen Resort, established at the west end of the lake in the mid-1930s. It was followed by the establishment of Loon Lake Resort by Ed and Pearl Dougherty in 1938, along with The White Moose by N. Fowler.

== See also ==
- List of lakes of British Columbia
