= Skeetchestn Indian Band =

The Skeetchestn Indian Band is a member of the Secwepemc (Shuswap) Nation, located in the Central Interior region of the Canadian province of British Columbia. Its main Indian reserve is located at Savona, British Columbia. The reserve was set up in the 1860s when the government of the then-Colony of British Columbia established an Indian reserve system. The Skeetchestn is a member government of the Shuswap Nation Tribal Council.

== Indian reserves ==
Indian reserves under the administration of the Skeetchestn Indian Band are:

- Hihium Lake Indian Reserve No. 6A, on north shore of Hihium Lake near NE corner of Hihium Lake Indian Reserve No. 6, 2.10 ha., shared with the Bonaparte First Nation 51°04′00″N 121°09′00″W
- Hihium Lake Indian Reserve No. 6B, on south shore of Hihium Lake, near its east end, 2.0 ha., shared with the Bonaparte First Nation 51°03′00″N 121°05′00″W
- Marshy Lake Indian Reserve No. 1, surrounding Sherwood Creek, E of Snohoosh Lake and the Deadman River, N of Kamloops Lake, 62.70 ha. 51°05′32″N 120°49′04″W
- Skeetchestn Indian Reserve, along the Deadman River and on the right (N) bank of the Thompson River, in the area of Savona, 7975.70 ha. 50°48′20″N 120°57′30″W

== See also ==
- Shuswap Nation Tribal Council
- Savona, British Columbia
