= Expo '67 Report =

- Presented by: Bob MacGregor; Norman Kiehl
- Country of origin: Canada
- Original language: English
- No. of seasons: 1

Production
- Producers: David Bloomberg; Frank Williams
- Production location: Montreal
- Running time: 30 minutes

Original release
- Network: CBC Television
- Release: 5 July – 6 September 1966

Related
- Expo This Week

Expo '67 Report is a Canadian news television program that aired on CBC Television in 1966.

== Premise ==
This series was a preview of Expo 67, the World's Fair in Montreal featuring news and interviews relating to the progress on planning and development of the Expo site. People associated with the event from architects to dignitaries of participating nations were interviewed.

For example, the 20 July 1966 episode featured interviews with Montreal mayor Jean Drapeau and journalist Charles Lynch on their impressions of the development of Expo 67. A news item also reported that apartments with a view to the Expo site had monthly rents of $1500 compared to typical Montreal rents of $40 to $400 per month.

The CBC's international broadcast centre at Expo 67 was budgeted at $10 million.

== Scheduling ==
This half-hour series was broadcast Tuesdays at 6:30 p.m. (Eastern) from 5 July to 6 September 1966.
