= Expo This Week =

Canadian news television series

- Genre: News
- Presented by: Peter Reilly; Chantal Beauregard; Lloyd Robertson
- Country of origin: Canada
- Original language: English
- No. of seasons: 1
- No. of episodes: 25

Production
- Executive producer: Thom Benson
- Producers: Jim Guthro; Peter Elkington
- Production location: Montreal
- Running time: 30 minutes

Original release
- Network: CBC Television
- Release: 2 May – 17 October 1967

Related
- Expo '67 Report

Expo This Week is a Canadian news television program that aired on CBC Television in 1967.

== Premise ==
This series provided weekly reports during Expo 67, the World's Fair in Montreal. Besides news of the past week's activities, episodes featured interviews with visitors and celebrities and reports on Expo venues.

Peter Reilly hosted the series until he left and was replaced by Lloyd Robertson in September. Chantal Beauregard was added as co-host from July.

== Production ==
The CBC's international broadcast centre at Expo 67 was budgeted at $10 million. The series was produced in colour, using technologically advanced portable video equipment for location reports.

Jim Guthro initially produced the series with assistance from David Pears. From July, Guthro was replaced by Peter Elkington who was first assisted by Wilfred Haydon, then from September by Bill Bolt.

Series sponsor was Shell Canada, supplemented by Chrysler Canada during the first six weeks.

== Scheduling ==
This half-hour series was broadcast Tuesdays at 9:00 p.m. (Eastern) from 2 May to 17 October 1967.

== See also ==
- Pavilion (TV series), another CBC TV series on Expo 67.
