= Marble Canyon (British Columbia) =

Valley in British Columbia, Canada

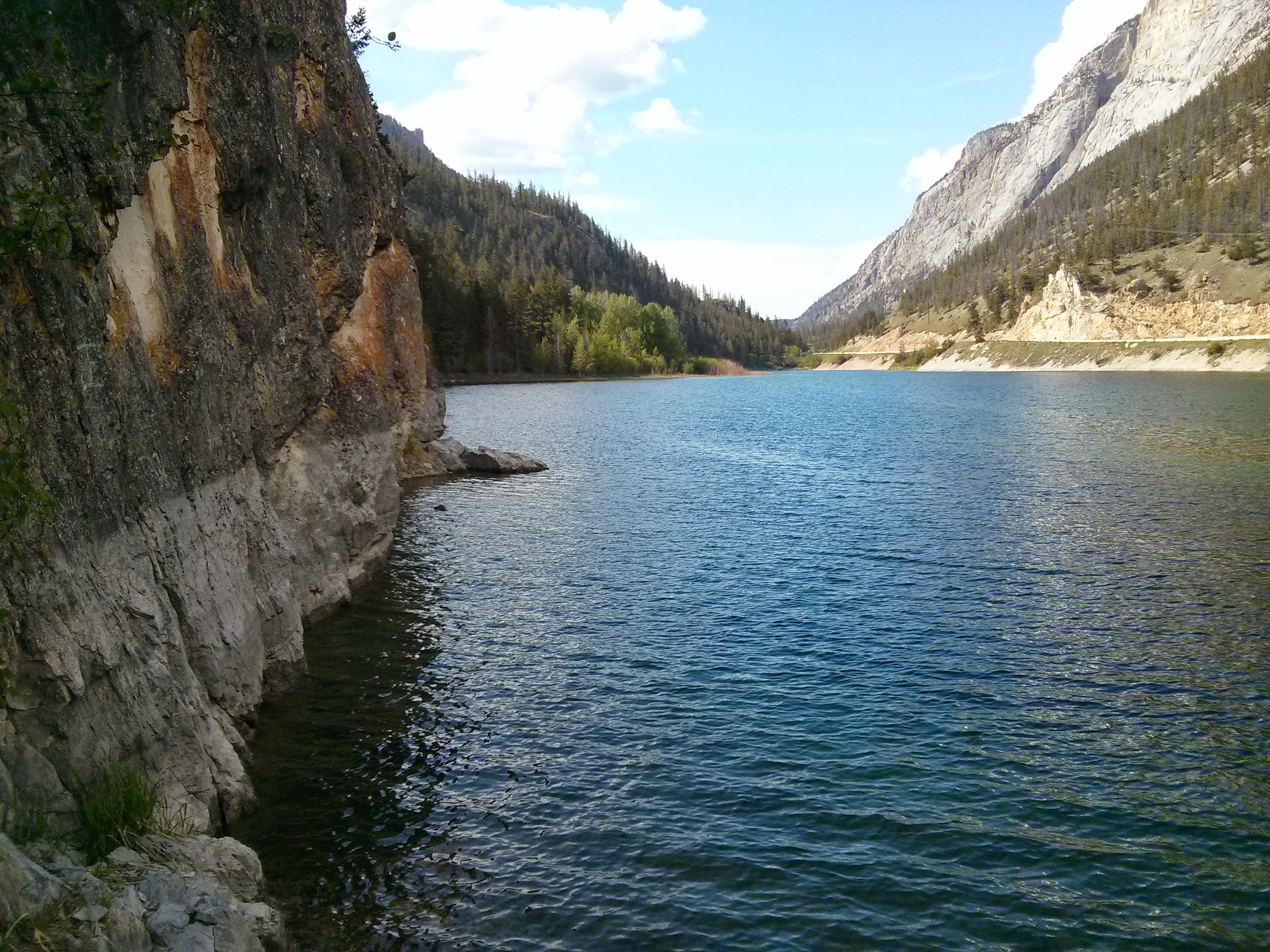

- Location within British Columbia

Geography
- Country: Canada
- Province: British Columbia
- Regional district: Squamish-Lillooet; Thompson-Nicola
- Coordinates: 50°50′00″N 121°41′00″W
- Interactive map of Marble Canyon

Marble Canyon is in the south-central Interior of British Columbia, a few kilometres east of the Fraser River and the community of Pavilion, midway between the towns of Lillooet and Cache Creek. The canyon stems from a collapsed karst formation.

== Nomenclature ==
The canyon's name comes from the brilliant limestone of its walls. The bedrock is microcrystalline limestone (sedimentary rock) rather than marble (metamorphic rock).

The native name of the canyon in the Shuswap language is, when referring to the whole, sxmeltám, possibly referring to "Indian doctors", while the name for the area of Crown and Turquoise Lakes and the provincial campground and adjoining south wall is getsgátsp, of unknown meaning. In addition to the steep walls rising from the lake's southeastern end, there is an eroded pinnacle known as Chimney Rock, or in a translation of K'lpalekw, the Secwepemc (Shuswap) name for it, Coyote's Penis.

== Geography ==
The north wall is over 965 metres (3,166 ft) high above Pavilion Lake and is the southernmost extent of the Marble Range; the south wall is c. 515 m (1500 ft) and is the northern extremity of the Clear Range. Higher peaks lie in behind the walls, increasing the depth if measured from their summits.

== Stromatolites ==
Within the canyon are a series of lakes draining towards the Fraser River via Pavilion Creek. The largest of these is Pavilion Lake, which is home to a colony of microbialites (also known as stromatolites), unusual carbonate structures built by bacteria which resemble freshwater "coral" and which are the largest freshwater stromatolites in the world.

== Rock and ice climbing ==
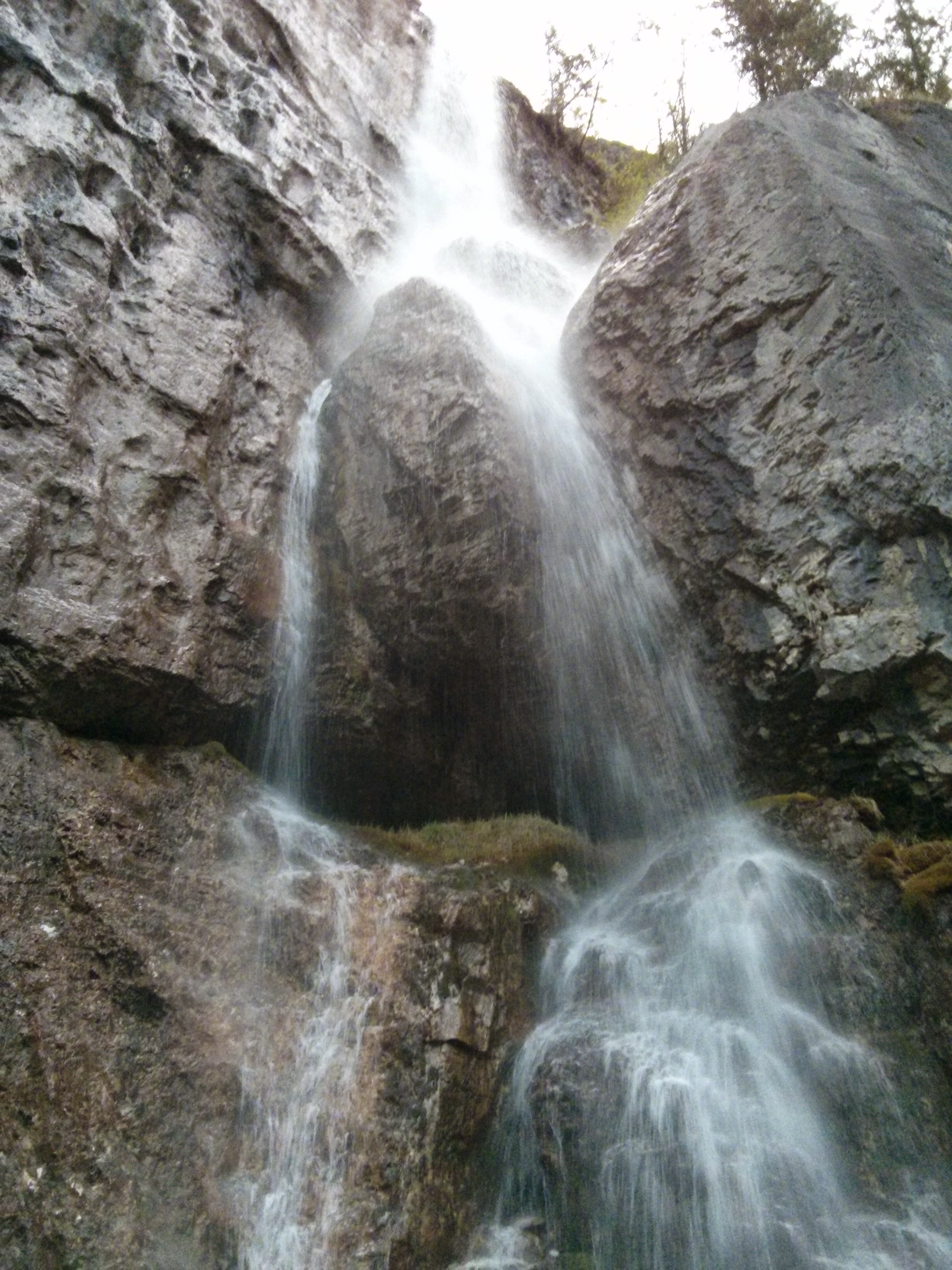
Waterfall near Crown Lake

Marble Canyon is popular with climbers, both for its clean rock walls and also for its ice climbs, including one waterfall that freezes solid in midwinter (officially Crown Lake Falls but to climbers, "Icy BC"), and which is immediately opposite the provincial park campground adjacent to Highway 99 from Lillooet to Cache Creek, British Columbia.

== Cultural rights ==
These areas and Pavilion Lake, in addition to being provincial park, are also governed by special cultural rights and have important spiritual significance of the Pavilion Band.

== See also ==
- Marble Canyon Provincial Park
- Marble Canyon 3 (Indian Reserve)
- Pavilion, British Columbia
- Pavilion Lake
- Hat Creek (British Columbia)
- Upper Hat Creek, British Columbia
