= Downing Provincial Park =

Provincial park in British Columbia, Canada

- IUCN category II (national park)
- Location within British Columbia
- Interactive map of Downing Provincial Park
- Location: Lillooet Land District, British Columbia, Canada
- Nearest city: Clinton, BC
- Coordinates: 51°00′29″N 123°46′55″W
- Area: 156 ha (390 acres)
- Established: July 9, 1970
- Governing body: BC Parks

Downing Provincial Park is a provincial park in British Columbia, Canada, created when Mr. and Mrs. Clair Downing donated their half-mile of lake frontage property on Kelly Lake. The park's size, including the 97 acres (0.39 km^{2}) donated by the Downings, is 156 hectares. It is located adjacent to the British Columbia Railway line and the Pavilion Mountain Road about 30 km west of Clinton, at the junction with the road to Jesmond and Kostering.

== See also ==
- Edge Hills Provincial Park
