= Pavilion Theatre =

Pavilion Theatre or Pavilion Theater may refer to:

== United Kingdom ==
- Pavilion Theatre (Glasgow), Scotland
- Pavilion Theatre, Bournemouth, part of the Bournemouth International Centre complex, England
- Pavilion Theatre, Brighton, former name of Studio Theatre (Brighton)
- Pavilion Theatre, Cromer Pier, a seaside theatre on Norfolk, England
- Pavilion Theatre (Rhyl), a theatre in Rhyl, Wales
- Pavilion Theatre, Torquay (1912–1976), an historic theatre in Torquay, Devon
- Pavilion Theatre, Whitby, a theatre in North Yorkshire
- Pavilion Theatre, Whitechapel, an historic theatre

== Other countries ==
- Chatham Garden Theatre or Pavilion Theatre, a playhouse in the Chatham Gardens of New York City
- Pavilion Theater, a former movie theater in New York City now run as one of two Nitehawk Cinemas
- Pavilion Theatre, Adelaide, former name of a cinema more well known as the Rex Theatre in Adelaide, Australia
- Pavilion Theatre (Dún Laoghaire), a theatre in Dún Laoghaire, Ireland

== See also ==
- London Pavilion, a music hall until 1923
- Pavilion (disambiguation)
- Weymouth Pavilion, a theatre at Weymouth, Southern England
