= Pavillon =

Pavillon may refer to:

- Le Pavillon Hotel, New Orleans
- Le Pavillon (New York City restaurant), a former New York City restaurant
- Pavillon de Flore, a section of the Palais du Louvre in Paris, France
- Pavillon de Paris, a large concert space in Paris, France
- Pavillon de l'Arsenal, a center for urban planning and museum in Paris, France
- Pavillon de la Jeunesse, an indoor arena in Quebec City, Quebec
- Pavillon des sports Modibo Keita, an indoor sporting arena in Bamako, Mali
- Le Pavillon-Sainte-Julie, a commune in the Aube department in north-central France
- Pavillon de l’Horloge, a structure by architect Jacques Lemercier

== People with the surname ==
- Étienne Pavillon, French lawyer and poet
- Nicolas Pavillon, French bishop of Alet and Jansenist

== See also ==
- Pavilion (disambiguation)
