= Marble Canyon Provincial Park =

Provincial park in British Columbia, Canada

- IUCN category II (national park)
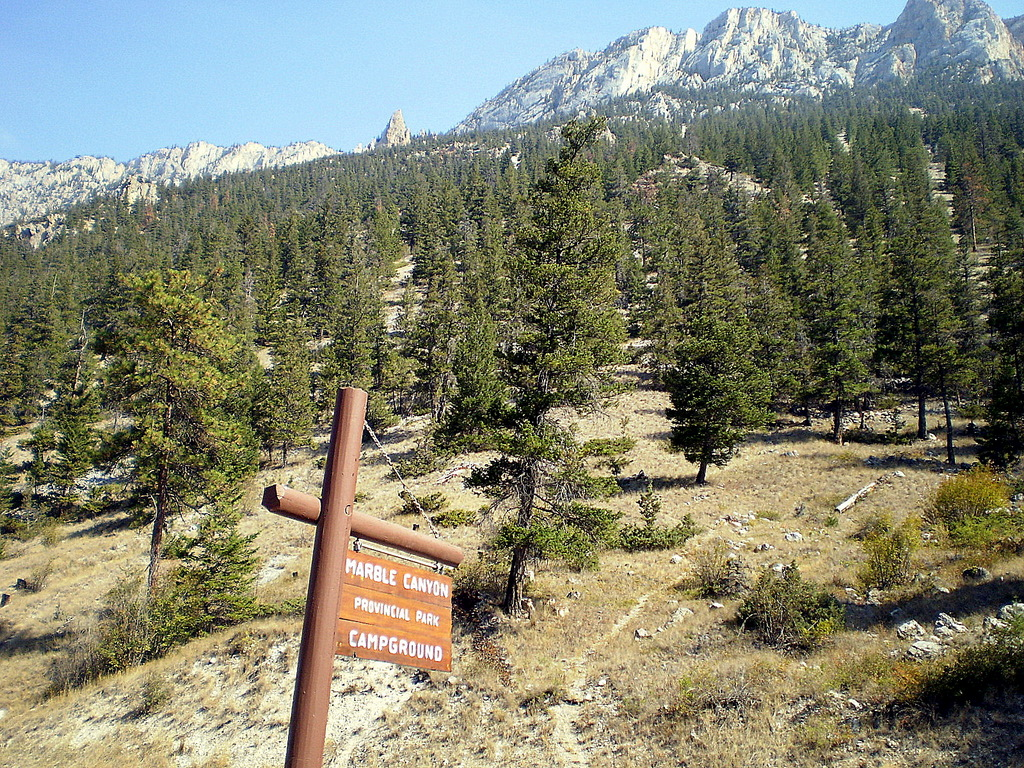

- Location within British Columbia
- Interactive map of Marble Canyon Provincial Park
- Location: British Columbia, Canada
- Nearest city: Lillooet
- Coordinates: 50°52′00″N 121°43′04″W
- Area: 25.44 km^{2} (9.82 sq mi)
- Established: March 23, 1956
- Governing body: BC Parks
- Website: bcparks.ca/marble-canyon-park/

Marble Canyon Provincial Park is a provincial park in British Columbia, Canada, established in 1956 to protect Marble Canyon, a limestone formation at the south end of the Marble Range. In 2001, the park was expanded to 355 hectares to include all of Pavilion Lake due to the presence of microbialites, a type of stromatolite important to research into astrobiology and other fields. In 2010, it was further expanded to 2,544 hectares.

== History ==
The park is also important in the culture of the Tskway'laxw people in whose territory it is located. Concealed in the side canyons of the gorge are pictograph sites. Within the park and along Pavilion Lake at its further end from the main part of the canyon is Chimney Rock, the Secwepemc'tsn name for which, K'lpalekw, means "Coyote's Penis", and is an important spiritual site.

== Recreation ==
A waterfall into Crown Lake, at the park's campground, is famous among ice-climbers as "Icy BC" and the walls of Marble Canyon are a major draw for rock climbers. All three of the park's lakes are popular with recreational fishermen.

== Facilities ==
The park's campground is located adjacent to British Columbia Highway 99 as it passes through the canyon. There are 30 campsites open from April to September.
