= Lower Nicola Indian Band =

Lower Nicola Indian Band Band No. 695
- People: Nłeʔkepmx

Land
- Main reserve: Nicola Mameet 1
- Other reserve(s): Hamilton Creek 7; Hihium Lake 6; Joeyaska 2; Logan's 6; Pipsuel 3; Speous 8; Zoht 14; Zoht 4; Zoht 5

Population
- On reserve: 479
- On other land: 57
- Off reserve: 1023
- Total population: 1,561

Government
- Chief: kʷúkʷpiʔ Stuart Jackson
- Council: Arthur Dick; William Bose (Bill); Robin Humphrey; Connie Joe; Lesley Manuel; William Sandy; Lucinda Seward

Website
- www.lnib.net

Lower Nicola Indian Band (Thompson: Nʔeʔiyk) is a Nlaka'pamux First Nations government, located in the Central Interior region of the Canadian province of British Columbia.

The Lower Nicola Indian Band reserve community and offices are located at Shulus, also known as Lower Nicola, six kilometres west of Merritt, British Columbia, the main urban centre in the region between the Lower Mainland and Kamloops.

== Government ==
The band is led by an elected council, with the current term running from 1 October 2022, to 4 October 2025.

=== Chief ===
- kʷúkʷpiʔ (Chief) Stuart Jackson

=== Councilors ===
- Arthur Dick (Full Time Councilor)
- William Bose (Bill)
- Robin Humphrey
- Connie Joe
- Lesley Manuel
- William Sandy
- Lucinda Seward

== Laws ==
Lower Nicola Indian Band is Operational under the First Nations Land Management Act which through the Lower Nicola Indian Band Land Code, enables Lower Nicola Indian Band to opt-out of 34 Sections of the Indian Act related to the management of reserve lands. The Lower Nicola Indian Band operates the First Nations Fiscal Management Act which through the Lower Nicola Indian Band Financial Administration Law, which provides a framework for the responsible management of its financial resources.

== Demographics ==
The Band currently has 1,561 members living on and off its nine reserves. It has active language and cultural programs and its LNIB School is an independent school that follows BC Cirriculum. Their teachers not only have their BC Teaching Certificates, but have knowledge and deep appreciation of First Nations’ cultures.

== Reserves ==
Lower Nicola Indian Band has jurisdiction over the following reserves:

- Nicola Mameet 1 - 11,350 Acres - 581 Residents. Kamloops Dist On The Banks Of Guichon Creek And The Nicola River Near Their Junction 3 Miles Northwest Of Merritt
- Joeyaska 2 - 320 Acres - 42 Residents. Kamloops District In Sec 11 Twp 91, On Godey Creek 3miles Southeast Of Merrit
- Pipseul 3 - 220 Acres, Kamloops District, In Sections 27&28, Tp.17, R.21, W.6m, On Guichon And Meadow Creeks
- Zoht 4 - 500 Acres - 35 Residents. Kamloops District, In Tp94, 2 Miles North Of Nicola, At West End Of Nicola Lake
- Zoht 5 - 160 Acres, Kamloops District, In Sec. 36, Tp.94, Lot 716, G.1., On Clapperton Creek, 6 Miles North Of Nicola
- Logan's 6 - 45 Acres. Kamloops District On Quilchena Creek Flowing Into Nicola Lake
- Hamilton Creek 7 -4,400 Acres - 42 Residents. Kamloops Dist., On Quilchena Creek, 6 Miles From Mouth Of Nicola Lake
- Speous 8 - 280 Acres. Kamloops Dist Pt In Sec 36, Tp13, R23, W.6m. (In Rr Belt) & Pt Outside Belt, 1 Mile South Of Canford C.P. Station
- Zoht 14 - 160 Acres, Kamloops District, Lot 4210, In Tp.94, On Clapperton Creek 7 Miles North Of Nicola
- Hihium Lake 6 (Shared between Upper Nicola, Lower Nicola, Bonaparte, and Tk’emlúps te Secwépemc Bands) - 78 Acres. Kamloops District In Sec 16 Twp 24 Rge 23 W6m At West End Of Hihium Lake

== See also ==
- Scw'exmx
- Thompson language
