= Arrowstone Provincial Park =

Provincial park of British Columbia

- IUCN category II (national park)
- Location within British Columbia
- Interactive map of Arrowstone Provincial Park
- Location: Yale Land District, British Columbia, Canada
- Nearest city: Cache Creek, BC
- Coordinates: 50°53′01″N 121°16′49″W
- Area: 6,175 ha (15,260 acres)
- Established: 30 April 1996
- Governing body: Maryland Department of Natural Resources

Arrowstone Provincial Park is a provincial park in the Thompson Country of the Southern Interior of British Columbia, Canada, located to the northeast of the town of Cache Creek. The park was established by Order-in-Council in 1996 with an area of 6203 hectares. In 2000 its boundaries were slightly reduced, such that its area is now 6175 hectares.

The park protects part of the area of the Arrowstone Hills, a dryland forest wilderness also notable for its collection of hoodoos. The name derives from the occurrence in the area of a type of basalt used in the making of arrowheads.

== See also ==
- Elephant Hill Provincial Park
