= Cache Creek terrane =

Geologic terrane in British Columbia and southern Yukon, Canada

Coordinates: 59°N 132°W

The Cache Creek terrane (alternately known as Cache Creek Melange) is a geologic terrane in British Columbia and southern Yukon, Canada.

The Cache Creek terrane consists of Carboniferous to Lower Jurassic volcanic rocks, carbonate rocks, coarse clastic rocks and small amounts of ultramafic rock, chert and argillite.

Three geological formations comprise the Cache Creek Terrane: the Sitlika Assemblage, the Tezzeron succession and the Cache Creek Complex.

This terrane is mentioned in the video Where terranes collide (done in conjunction with Canada's geologic survey).

== See also ==
- Cache Creek, British Columbia
