= Elephant Hill Provincial Park =

Provincial park in British Columbia, Canada

- IUCN category II (national park)
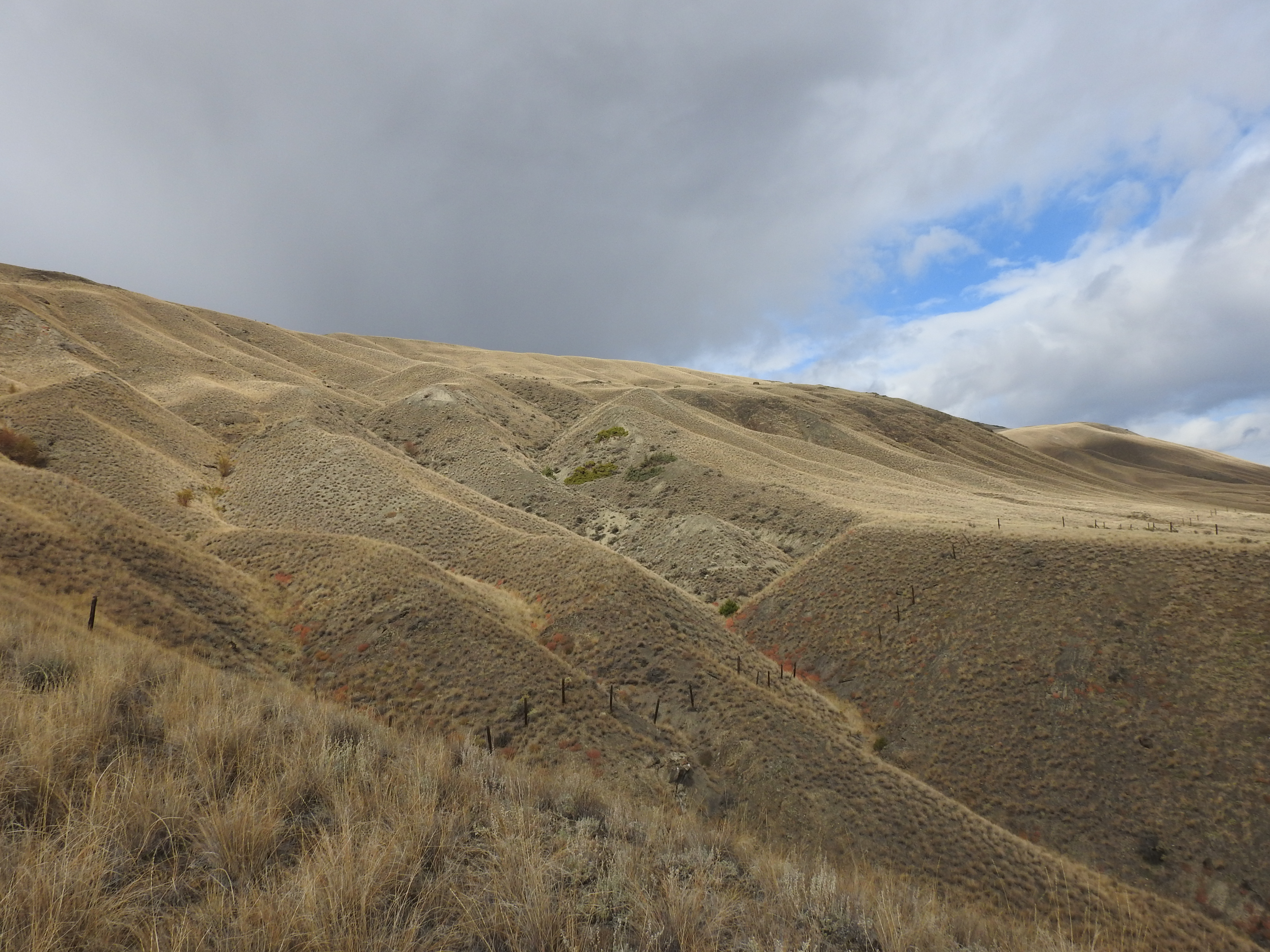

- Location within British Columbia
- Interactive map of Elephant Hill Provincial Park
- Location: Kamloops Division Yale Land District, British Columbia, Canada
- Nearest city: Ashcroft, BC
- Coordinates: 50°46′00″N 121°17′18″W
- Area: 968 ha (2,390 acres)
- Established: April 30, 1996
- Governing body: BC Parks

Elephant Hill Provincial Park is a provincial park in British Columbia, Canada, protecting Elephant Hill, a prominent landmark adjacent to the Trans-Canada Highway at the cut-off for the town of Ashcroft, a few miles south of the town of Cache Creek. The park is approximately 968 hectares in area. The park was heavily burned by the 2017 Elephant Hill wildfire.
