= Kelly Lake (Florida) =

- Location within Florida Location within the United States
- Location: Lakeland, Florida
- Coordinates: 27.9972°N 81.9632°W
- Type: manmade freshwater lake
- Basin countries: United States
- Max. length: 1,265 feet (386 m)
- Max. width: 295 feet (90 m)
- Surface area: 6.77 acres (3 ha)
- Surface elevation: 168 feet (51 m)
- Islands: 1

Kelly Lake is rectangular in shape, but is about six times as long as it is wide. This lake is a manmade freshwater lake in south Lakeland, Florida. It appears to have been a mine excavation that was landscaped to become a lake. This lake has a 6.77-acre (27,400 m^{2}) surface area. It is bounded on the east by a large strip mall and on the south by North Parkway Frontage Road, which is on the north side of Polk Parkway. On the west and north Kelly Lake is bordered by villas, which are listed as managed by Villas Associates Owners. Village Associates Owners maintains a tennis court on northeast edge of the lake and on the north side, at 570 Caribbean Drive, maintains a clubhouse and a swimming pool. The clubhouse is actually an island just off the north shore and a boardwalk connects it to shore. This island clubhouse is 65 feet (20 m) long and 55 feet (17 m) wide.

Kelly Lake's south side can be accessed by fishermen along the street public right of way. However, there is no other public access, as there is nowhere the public may swim or launch any kind of boat.
