= Geology of Yukon =

The geology of Yukon includes sections of ancient Precambrian Proterozoic rock from the western edge of the proto-North American continent Laurentia, with several different island arc terranes added through the Paleozoic, Mesozoic and Cenozoic, driving volcanism, pluton formation and sedimentation.

== Geologic history, stratigraphy and tectonics ==
The rocks of eastern Yukon, together with those in neighboring British Columbia and Northwest Territories formed beginning more than 1.7 billion years ago in the Proterozoic. The region was at the western edge of the proto-North American continent Laurentia and in the uplifted mountains of the North American Cordillera, preserves one of the longest sedimentary records in the world. Proterozoic sediments are known from inliers within the more dominant Paleozoic rocks.

The 13-kilometer (8.1 mi) Wernecke Supergroup deposited between cratons with siliciclastic and carbonate rocks. Breccia remains from volcanic eruptions 1.7 billion years ago in collapsed pits. Dikes, sills, and pillow lavas near the Hart River formed in connection with crustal extension 1.32 billion years ago. The 2.5-kilometer (1.6 mi) thick Pinguicula Group sandstone, dolomite, siltstone and shale deposited 1.27 billion years ago. The sedimentary rock contains a 200 million-year gap after the Pinguicula Group.

The Mackenzie Mountains Supergroup in the east and the Fifteenmile Group in the west were deposited with carbonates, sandstone, siltstone, and shale around one billion years ago. Regional folding, which produced the Corn Creek orogeny took place around 900 million years ago, leaving behind interlaced transcurrent faults in the vicinity of the current day Snake River. This interpretation is supported by a low-angle unconformity underneath the Callison Lake Dolomite in the south of the Ogilvie Mountains.

The Yukon was part of the supercontinent Rodinia until it began to break up 850 million years ago, separating the proto-North American continent of Laurentia. The continental breakup is marked by basalt flows from 778 million years ago in the Mackenzie Mountains in the Northwest Territories. The Coates Lake Group records shallow water gypsum, limestone, and sandstone formed at the equator while the Mount Harper Group is indicative of sub-sea volcanism. Around 718 million years ago, these units were capped with dacite associated with the Franklin dike swarms and the doming of the western Arctic. Glacial material in the Rapitan Group deposited below water during the Sturtian glaciation, one of the two main glaciations within the Cryogenian Snowball Earth period. The rocks of the group include iron-rich sediments and a carbonate cap.

Ediacaran multicellular life (the first multicellular organism) and blue-green algae appear in carbonate and siltstone within the Windermere Supergroup which deposited between the glaciations. As Laurentia drifted, a passive continental margin developed with significant sedimentation.

=== Paleozoic (541-251 million years ago) ===
In the early Paleozoic, the Mackenzie Platform accumulated material, including deep water sediments in the Cambrian in the vicinity of Mayo and Dawson. Regional crustal extension formed the Redstone Arch (now present in the Mackenzie Mountains) as well as embayments found along the provincial line with Northwest Territories and British Columbia. Thick carbonates such as the Bouvette Formation in the north or the eastern Sunblood Formation formed in slowly subsiding sections of both the Macdonald and Mackenzie platforms. The Tintina Fault shifted the Cassiar Terrane—a 60-kilometer-wide section of carbonates on continental crust north up to 490 kilometers, where it now forms a part of the Pelly Mountains in the center of the territory.

The creation of the Selwyn Basin brought deposition which records many of the events of the Paleozoic. The sand, limestone and shale of the Hyland Group formed first, ascending into the Cambrian Vampire Formation platform edge limestone and the Gull Lake Formation basalt. The Rabbitkettle and Crow formations deposited with sandstone and limestone into the Ordovician during a marine transgression. The Misty Creek embayment in the south Ogilvie Mountains and the edge of the basin in Faro have alkali basalts erupted during the period. Into the Devonian, the Road River Group chert, siltstone and mudstone built up in the basin, supplied with high temperature brines from seafloor vents which created zinc-lead deposits in Howards Pass and Anvil Ridge. Similar sediments are exposed in the Richardson Mountains in the north.

In the Middle Devonian, 390 million years ago, eastern Yukon was blanketed in sandstone, black shale and siltstone during a major marine advance. However, the Selwyn Basin was uplifted, leading to erosion of a chert-pebble conglomerate in the Earne Group which may have been carried along submarine canyons to the Macmillan Pass. The Earne Group includes zinc-lead and barite deposits generated by deep sea fissure vents. In the southeast and in the Ogilvie Mountains, the Keno Hill Quartzite and sandstone-mudstone Mattson Formation accumulated from Carboniferous river deltas carrying eroded material from a landmass to the north.

By the Pennsylvanian, a platform environment had returned with carbonate deposition in the east and north.

Northern Yukon, together with the Seward Peninsula and Brooks Range in Alaska are underlain by the Arctic Alaska Terrane. Its component, the North Slope subterrane underlies the Yukon's British Mountains, extends north into the Beaufort Sea and extends as far south as the Porcupine River. The exotic origins of the terrane remain unclear, although it is proposed to have developed between Siberia and Laurentia and likely collided in the Devonian. It has thick layers of siltstone, slate, chert and limestone from the Neoproterozoic to the Devonian which form the core of the British Mountains. Deposited on the Franklinian margin, the oldest are overlain by sandstone and silt in the Cambrian Neruokpuk Formation.

The collision of the terrane spurred the Romanzof orogeny, uplifting the rocks and driving erosion, leading to a Mississippian unconformity. The thickening of the crust during the orogeny caused melting and granite intrusions visible at Hoidahl Mountain, Old Crow Range and Mount Sedgwick.

Around the same time in the mid-Paleozoic, the "Intermontane terranes" that underlie the Yukon Plateau in the central part of the territory were added to the Laurentian margin. Most of the terranes originated as part of the Panthalassa Ocean, the proto-Pacific Ocean.

The Cache Creek terrane is near the center and is the remains of oceanic crust, in the form of basalt, argillite, chert, gabbro, various ultramafic rocks and limestone dating from the Pennsylvanian to the Jurassic.

The Yukon-Tanana and Slide Mountain terranes accreted between the Devonian and the Triassic. The Snowcap Assemblage metamorphosed sedimentary and volcanic rocks of the Yukon-Tanana terrane is overlain by Finlayson, Klinkit and Klondike metavolcanic and metasedimentary rocks. The Snowcap Assemblage and even some overlying rocks are intruded with Devonian-Mississippian granodiorite, tonalite and granite.

The Finlayson Lake district preserves the Slide Mountain Terrane which has chert, greenstone, phyllite, conglomerate and metavolcanic rocks in the Fortin Creek Group overlain by chert, limestone, argillite and quartzite as well as gabbro and ultramafic rocks. Eclogite from 270 million years provides evidence that the Slide Mountain Terrane subducted beneath the Yukon-Tanana Terrane.

=== Mesozoic (251-66 million years ago) ===
In the Mesozoic, through the early Jurassic, platform conditions persisted in the east and north, as chert shale, sandstone and carbonate built up the Mount Christie and Fantasque formations, overlain by Jones Lake and Grayling-Toad formation shales. The Cache Creek Terrane (which extends as far north as Whitehorse) was surrounded on either side by the Stikinia and Quesnellia terranes. Because both include Triassic augite, have Paleozoic volcanic rocks and are juxtaposed along the Teslin Fault, the two terranes are difficult to distinguish.

Southwest Yukon built up with addition of exotic terranes in the Mesozoic, uplifting the platform and resulting in erosion of older sedimentary units.

As the Stikinia, Cache Creek and Quesnellia terranes converged in the Middle Jurassic the Whitehorse Trough developed as a basin, filling with three kilometers of Laberge Group sandstone, conglomerate, shale, coal, deep-water turbidite and Nordienskiold Formation pyroclastic flows. The Laberge Group overlies the Quesnellia and Stikinia terranes unconformably and had Jurassic-age volcanism around it during its formation. Tantalus Formation coal, sandstone and conglomerate from the early Cretaceous marks the final filling of the trough.

Two terranes, held together by a Middle Pennsylvanian pluton collided with the western edge of Laurentia in the Middle Jurassic. The Alexander terrane is made up of Cambrian-Ordovician quartz sandstone, limestone and mafic volcanic rocks, Ordovician-Silurian carbonates, siltstone and calcareous mudstone, as well as Devonian-Triassic siltstone, sandstone and carbonate. Geologists have subdivided the Alexander terrane into the Saint Elias subterrane in the Yukon and British Columbia (the Craig subterrane is located in Alaska). Some have suggested that the two subterranes were rifted off of Baltica and then brought together during the Silurian-Devonian Klakas orogeny.

The Wrangellia terrane linked with the Alexander is somewhat younger. Early Mississippian tuff, breccia, volcaniclastic sandstone and mafic volcanic rocks in the Skolai Group are the oldest rocks. The Skolai Group is separated from overlying Middle Triassic siltstone by a regional unconformity. Above the siltstone is the vast Nikolai Formation—basal conglomerate and basalt three kilometers thick, which extends far to the west into Alaska and as far south as Vancouver Island. It is interlayered with the Chitistone reef limestone and the deep marine McCarthy Formation. Nickel, copper and platinum group elements formed in ultramafic intrusions within the Nikolai Formation, deposited as gabbro, pyroxenite and dunite as the Kluane mafic-ultramafic complex.

During the Triassic, rifting may have briefly separated the two terrains before they rejoined, a possibility inferred from the Duke River Fault "suture" between the two terranes.

The two terranes have overlap assemblages with rocks formed across the two landmasses. The thick Dezadesh Formation turbidite and tuff deposited in a basin from the late Jurassic into the early Cretaceous.

In the early Cretaceous, a northwest-trending pluton belt intruded the Saint Elias subterrane along with the Kluane Ranges suite which intruded both terranes. The rocks are I-type calc-alkaline with copper porphyry, gold skarn and copper-molybdenum deposits. To the northeast of the Denali Fault, the Dawson Range and Whitehorse suites batholith generates the gold, copper and silver of Whitehorse Copper Belt. Further inland is the Cassiar suite and the Hyland and Anvil suites. The second group includes peraluminous granite with tungsten-molybdenum skarns intruding ancient North American rocks. The South Fork Volcanics for a large igneous complex north of the Ross River.

The most inland Cretaceous plutons are the Mayo, Tungsten and Tombstone suites northeast of the Tintina faults, intruding older rocks deposited in the Selwyn Basin. The 97 to 94 million year old Tungsten suite has peraluminous granite with scheelite skarn deposits, while the 95 to 92 million year old Mayo suite extends to the northwest. The Tombstone suite is the youngest of the three, north of Dawson, with significant monzonite and syenite and a gold deposit at Brewery Creek.

Copper-gold porphyry, basalt and basalt andesite are particularly common in small plutons in between the Denali and Tintina faults on the Yukon Plateau.

=== Cenozoic (66 million years ago-present) ===
From the Paleocene into the Oligocene, the conglomerate, coal seams and sandstone of the Amphitheatre Formation deposited atop the Alexander and Wrangellia terranes in a basin that developed along the Denali Fault. Placer gold accumulated within the conglomerate and then eroded out and became new placer material within the Kluane Ranges. During the Miocene, andesite, basalt and volcaniclastic rocks erupted as the Pacific Plate subducted beneath Alaska and the Yukon.

The Ruby Range suite pluton formed the core of the Coast Plutonic Complex with tonalite and granodiorite between 64 and 56 million years ago, with significant copper-molybdenum porphyry and epithermal mineralization. Close to the Mount Skokum gold mine, the south Dawson Range and the Sifton Range west of Whitehorse have the Eocene felsic volcanic rocks of the Skukum Group.

In the Oligocene, the Yakutat terrane, a section of Cretaceous flysch and mélange together with Paleogene basalt from the Pacific Plate split off the western edge of the Canadian Cordillera and added on to the western edge of the Yukon. The Chugach terrane, with siltstone, argillite and sandstone trench fill from the Cretaceous and early Paleogene layered on top of the Yakutat terrane along the Border Ranges Fault. The fault is interpreted as the subduction zone fault shifted onto land by the Yakutat collision.

Volcanic activity continued until the Miocene, eight million years ago, with the Miles Canyon Basalt. The youngest volcanic rocks are the less than three million year old Watson Lake, Rancheria and Selkirk basalt flows.
