= Jesmond, British Columbia =

Coordinates: 51°15′00″N 121°57′00″W

Jesmond is a ranching community in the South Cariboo region of the Interior of British Columbia, Canada, located in the area west of the town of Clinton on the road from Kelly Lake, which is on the Pavilion-Clinton Road, to Big Bar Creek and Big Bar Ferry. Jesmond once had a post office, starting in 1913, when the postmaster adopted the name of his father's birthplace in the United Kingdom as the name of the place, until 1960 when it was closed.

Echo Valley complex in the community features the Baan Thai Pavilion, the first traditional Thai structure designed to withstand the colder temperate climate. The building was designed by Pinyo Suwankiri, a Thai National Artist in architecture.

== See also ==
- List of communities in British Columbia
