= Pavilion (TV program) =

Canadian travel documentary television series

- Genre: Travel documentary
- Presented by: Lloyd Robertson
- Country of origin: Canada
- Original language: English
- No. of seasons: 1

Production
- Producer: Rosalind Farber
- Running time: 30 minutes

Original release
- Network: CBC Television
- Release: 7 July – 29 September 1967

Pavilion is a Canadian travel documentary television series that aired on CBC Television in 1967.

== Premise ==
Lloyd Robertson presented film features on the various nations that hosted pavilions at Expo 67 in Montreal, such as Australia, Austria, Denmark, Finland, France, Iceland, Israel, Japan, Mauritius, the Netherlands, Norway, Sweden, Tanzania, the United Kingdom, the United States and West Germany.

== Scheduling ==
This half-hour series was broadcast on CBC Fridays at 5:30 p.m. (Eastern) from 7 July to 29 September 1967.

== See also ==
- Expo This Week, another CBC TV series on Expo 67
