= Pavilions Shopping Centre =

Pavilions Shopping Centre may refer to:

- Pavilions Birmingham, in Birmingham, England
- The Pavilions in Uxbridge, London, England
- Swords Pavilions
