= Upper Hat Creek =

- Location of Upper Hat Creek in British Columbia
- Coordinates: 50°39′00″N 121°35′00″W
- Country: Canada
- Province: British Columbia
- Regional district: Thompson-Nicola
- Area codes: 250, 778

Upper Hat Creek is a rural locality and ranching community in British Columbia, Canada, located roughly midway between the towns of Cache Creek and Lillooet, located near the headwaters of Hat Creek. Comprising the upper basin of Hat Creek the area is home to some of the oldest ranches in British Columbia. At the area's northeastern edge, near Marble Canyon, large lignite deposits have spurred interest since first discovered by prospectors during the Fraser Canyon Gold Rush and are the basis of the aborted Hat Creek coal-thermal proposal. During the gold rush, a trail from Foster Bar led through Upper Hat Creek to the Bonaparte River and then northwards via the Brigade Trail.

== See also ==
- Blue Earth Lake
