= Tsʼkwʼaylaxw First Nation =

The Tsʼkwʼaylaxw First Nation, formerly the Pavilion Indian Band and also known as the Tskʼwaylacw First Nation, Tskʼweylecw First Nation, and in the plural e.g. Tsʼkwʼalaxw First Nations, is a First Nations government, located in the Fraser Canyon region of the Central Interior of the Canadian province of British Columbia. It was created when the government of the then-Colony of British Columbia established an Indian reserve system in the 1860s.

The Tsʼkwʼaylaxw First Nation are part of both the Secwepemc (Shuswap) and Stʼatʼimc (Lillooet) Nations, and are located at Pavilion in the Fraser Canyon north of Lillooet.

The Tsʼkwʼaylaxw First Nation is one of three Secwepemc bands that is not a member of either the Shuswap Nation Tribal Council or the Northern Shuswap Tribal Council. The people of Tsʼkwʼaylaxw First Nation are also partially Sťáťimc (Lillooet) and belong to the Lillooet Tribal Council (Stʼatʼimc Nation).

In the Stʼatʼimcets language, Pavilion is called Tsʼkwʼaylacw or Tsʼkwʼaylaxw ("frost") (Pavilion is at a high elevation and much of the community is in shade for most of the day in winter, leading to frozen ground). The same name in the Secwepmectsin is Tskʼwéylecw. The people themselves are called the Tskʼwaylacwʼmc in Stʼatʼimcets, or Tskʼweylecwʼmc in Secwepmectsin.

== Reserves ==
Indian Reserves assigned to and administered by the Tsʼkwʼaylaxw First Nation are:

- Leon Creek Indian Reserve No. 2, 472.50 ha., at the junction of Leon Creek with the Fraser River
- Leon Creek Indian Reserve No 2A, 176.40 ha., adjoining Leon Creek IR No. 2 to the south and west.
- Marble Canyon Indian Reserve No. 3, 263.10 ha., on the Lillooet-Cache Creek highway (99) at the southeast end of Marble Canyon
- Pavilion Indian Reserve No. 1. 881.20 ha., at (and forming a large part of) the community of Pavilion
- Pavilion Indian Reserve No. 1A, 16.20 ha., one mile up McKay Creek on the opposite (west side) of the Fraser River from Pavilion
- Pavilion Indian Reserve No. 3, 245.20 ha., north of and adjoining Marble Canyon IR No. 3
- Pavilion Indian Reserve No. 4, 45.30 ha., adjoining Marble Canyon IR No. 3
- Tsʼkwʼalaxw Indian Reserve No. 5, 16.10 ha.. 20 km southeast of Lillooet.

== Population ==
There are 528 registered band members, 258 of whom live off-reserve.
