= Marble Range =

Mountain range in Canada

Coordinates: 51°07′00″N 121°49′00″W

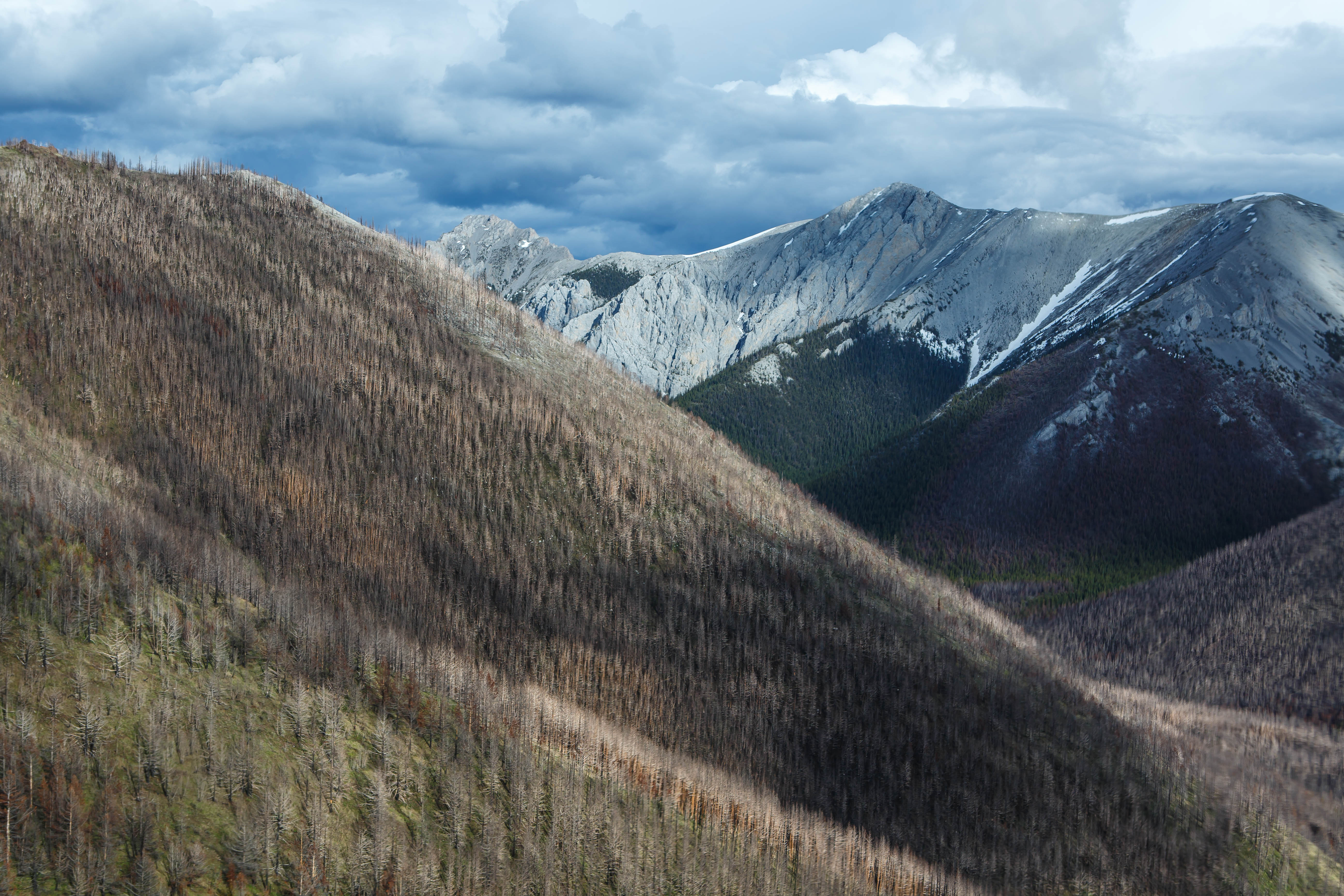

Dimensions
- Area: 1,727 km^{2} (667 mi^{2})

Geography
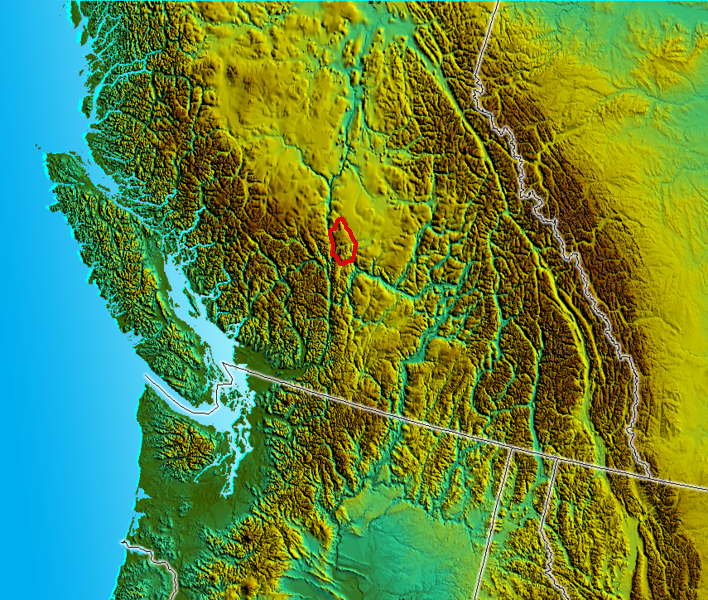
- Location map of the Marble Range
- Country: Canada
- Province: British Columbia
- Parent range: Fraser Plateau

The Marble Range is a small mountain range adjoining the Fraser River on the southwestern edge of the Interior Plateau of British Columbia. It has an area of 1,250 square kilometres and about 65 km NNW to SSE and about 20 km wide. Its southern flank is the north wall of Marble Canyon and the valley occupied by the ranching and First Nations community of Pavilion.

== See also ==
- Clear Range
- Pavilion Lake
