= Pavilion, British Columbia =

Pavilion Ts'kw'aylaxw, Tsk'waylacw, or Tsk'weylecw
- Ranching & Indian reserve community
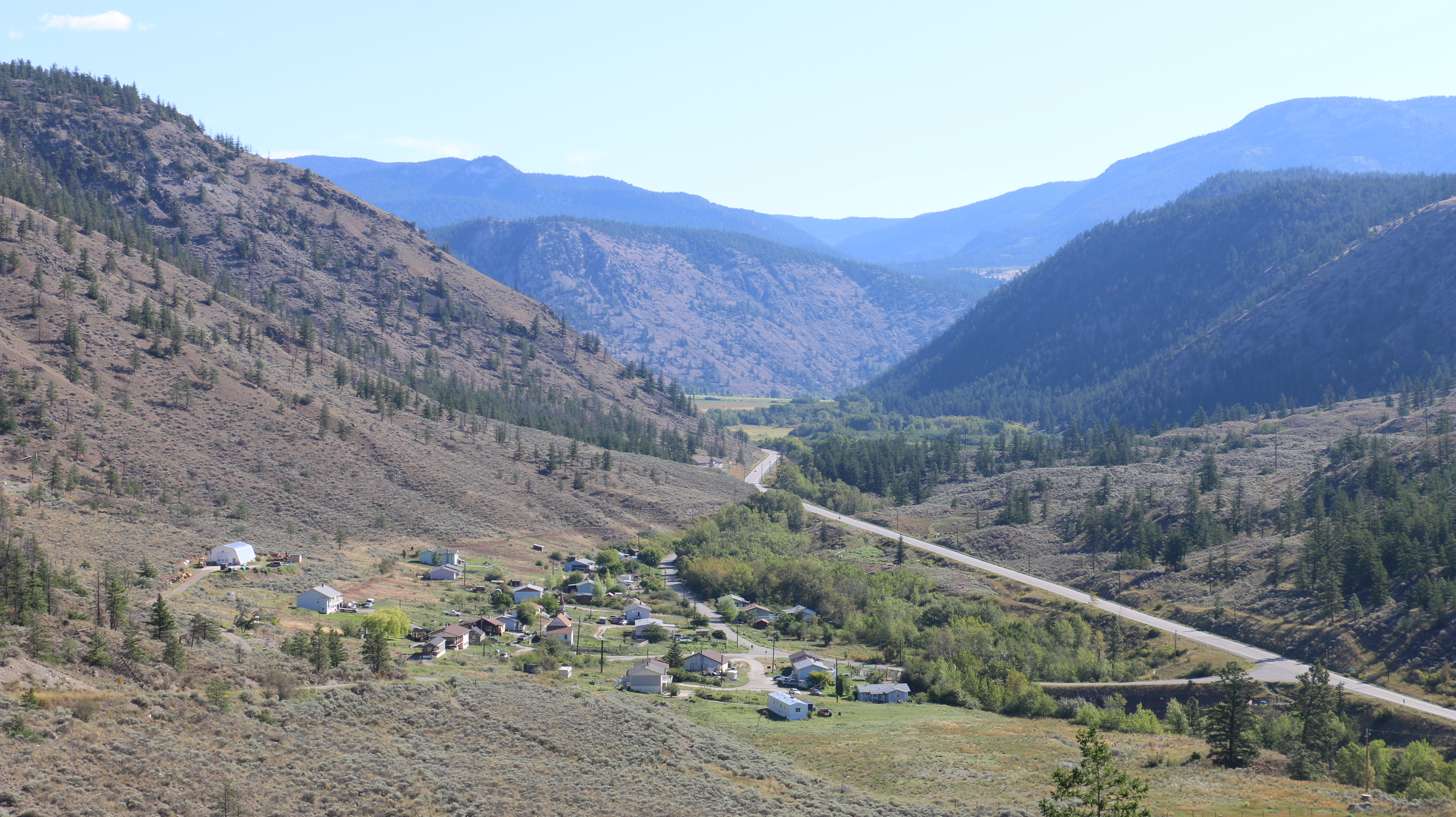

- Location with the Squamish-Lillooet Regional District of British Columbia
- Coordinates: 50°52′59″N 121°50′04″W
- Country: Canada
- Province: British Columbia
- Region: Fraser Canyon/Lillooet Country
- Regional district: Squamish-Lillooet
- Elevation: 2,390 ft (730 m)
- Area codes: 250, 778, 236, & 672
- Highways: Highway 99

Pavilion is an unincorporated community on the eastern side of the Fraser River in the South Cariboo region of southwestern British Columbia. The place is near Mile 21 of the Old Cariboo Road. On BC Highway 99, the locality is by road about 36 kilometres (22 mi) northeast of Lillooet and 135 kilometres (84 mi) west of Kamloops.

== First Nations ==
The early anglicized version of the village name was Skwailuk, meaning hoar-frost, perhaps indicating the shaded ground remaining frozen during the long winters at this elevation. The Ts'kw'aylaxw First Nation (a.k.a. the Tsk'waylacw First Nation or Tsk'weylecw First Nation), residing on the Pavilion 1 Indian Reserve comprise most of the area population. The Pavilion dialect is a mix of St'at'imcets and Secwepemc'tsn and many of the place names in the surrounding country are Secwepemc'tsn.

== Name origin ==
In 1859, Lieutenant Mayne of the Royal Engineers observed the indigenous people possessed a basic fluency in French from earlier contact with the fur traders. In 1862, Mayne published his journals for this period. He recalled a large white flag waving over the grave of an indigenous chief. Pavilion is the French word for tent or flag. The location was on the River Trail during the Fraser Canyon Gold Rush. One explanation for its significance is that the large banner of white cloth informed passing travellers of the presence of a "friendly Indian" camp in the context of the then-recent Fraser Canyon War farther south along the Fraser, and perhaps was also a mark of wealth, cloth being an expensive trading item.

== Early community ==
In 1856, David Reynolds began squatting on Pavilion Creek near Pavilion Lake. In 1858, Capt. John Martley preempted 186 hectares (460 acres) in the vicinity. When Reynolds departed, Martley was granted this adjacent property. The Martley ranch was called "The Grange" and eventually comprised nearly 405 hectares (1,000 acres). At 22 Mile, the residence was a stop on the stage route. Martley also ran an Ashcroft–Lillooet freight business. In 1859, Pavilion comprised around 20 miners' huts, which provided a base to reorganize prior to proceeding to various mining prospects.

In 1881, Billy Kane bought the George Baillie property at 20 Mile, developing it into the "Box K" ranch. At 21 Mile, William Lee established a general store (1860s) and a flour mill (1872). The latter operated as late as 1909. The post office existed 1873, 1878–1881, 1882–1904, and 1905 onward.

By the early 1890s, Phil Garrigan owned the 20 Mile ranch. He also ran a store and blacksmith shop. Cornelius O’Halloran owned the 19 Mile ranch. His son was a justice of the British Columbia Court of Appeal 1938–1963. In 1899, a partnership between John Bates Bryson and J.C. Smith purchased the Grange ranch, of which Byson became the sole owner two years later. The place was a stage stop. In 1949, the property was sold to Colonel Victor Spencer becoming part of the "Diamond S Ranch".

The Lee general store building was modified or replaced over the decades. By the 1950s, the proprietors operated a bed and breakfast, five-table restaurant, post office/store, and gas bar. In 2000, an electrical fire destroyed the building. A community hall once existed.

== Roads and stages ==
Pavilion roads and stages outlines progress extending to the north. By 1862, Barnard's Express stages ran from Douglas north to Pavilion.

== Ferry ==
The caption to an 1890s photo describes the Low Bar Ferry as between Pavilion and High Bar, a concept that Morrow seems to have adopted. The photo is definitely a different ferry and the term Low Bar Ferry does not appear to have ever been used in the historical records. A cross river ferry subsidized from 1897, which existed between these two extremities, was called 20-Mile Post or Pavilion. The ferry was about 2.2 kilometres (1.4 mi) northwest of Pavilion.

The size of the subsidies over the next two decades covered the payroll for the ferry operator, suggesting the use of only a rowboat, a fact not specified until 1917. A new ferry operator's residence was built in 1938–39. The rowboat was replaced in 1937–38 and 1942–43.

In 1949, a two-passenger aerial cable ferry attached to concrete anchors was installed to augment the rowboat. Two years later, heavier cable and a larger cage were installed to carry passengers and freight together. The rowboat operated at least until 1958 and the aerial cage ferry until 1962. No type of ferry appears to have existed after the mid-1960s.

== Railway ==
During the Pacific Great Eastern Railway (PGE) construction, a hospital was based at Pavilion. By mid-October 1915, the rail head was 40 kilometres (25 mi) from Lillooet, having passed through Pavilion and reached the head of Pavilion Lake. In early January 1916, passenger service through Pavilion to Clinton commenced. The Pavilion flag stop was 8.2 kilometres (5.1 mi) northeast of Glen Fraser and 8.2 kilometres (5.1 mi) southwest of Moran.
