= Clinton, British Columbia =

Clinton
- Village
- Village of Clinton
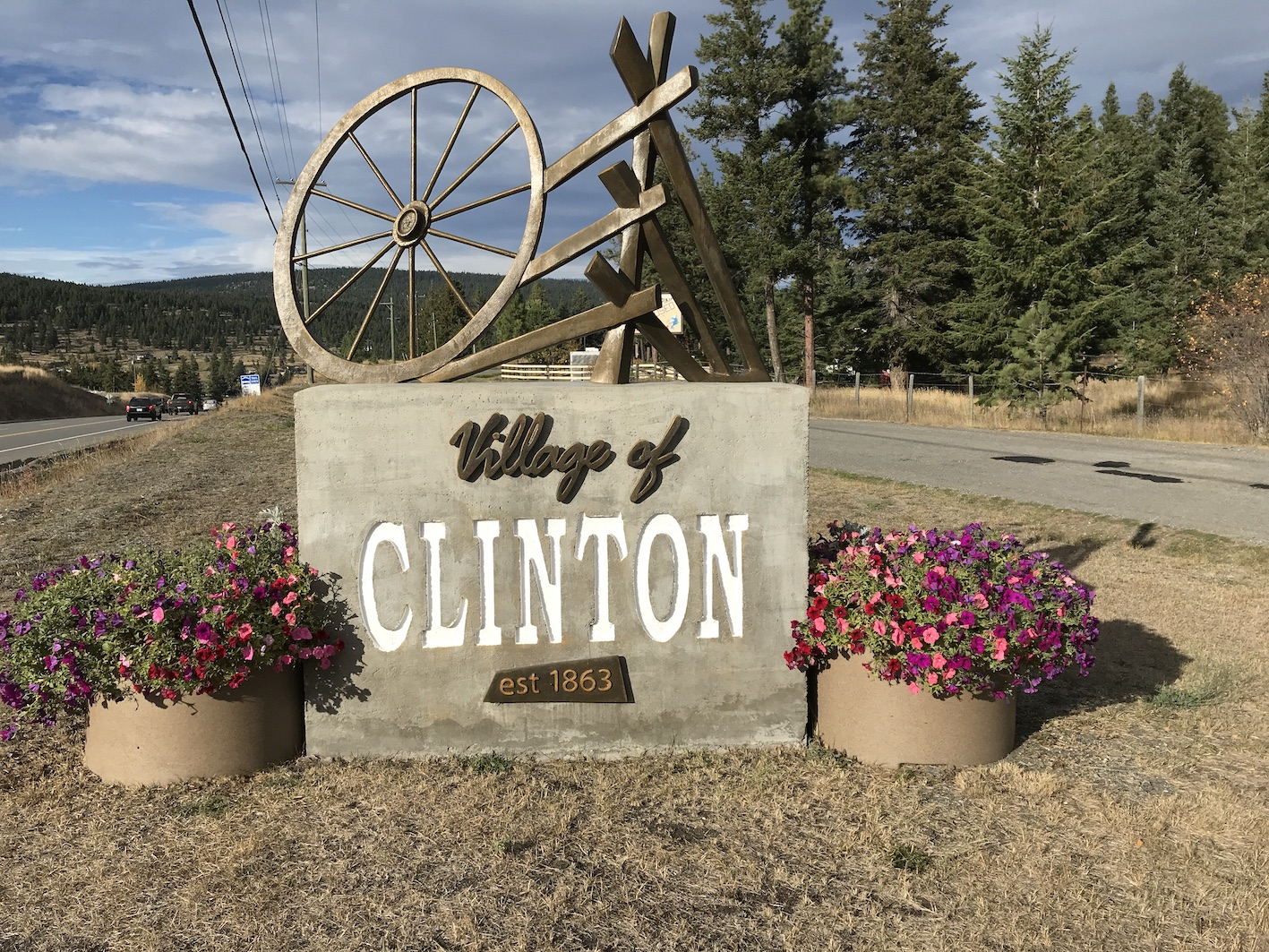
- Clinton's welcome sign

- Location of Clinton in British Columbia
- Coordinates: 51°05′25″N 121°35′28″W
- Country: Canada
- Province: British Columbia
- Regional district: Thompson–Nicola
- Incorporated: 1963

Government
  - Type: Mayor and Council
  - Governing body: Clinton Village Council
  - Mayor: Roland Stanke

Area
  - Total: 8.19 km^{2} (3.16 sq mi)
- Elevation: 900 m (3,000 ft)

Population (2021)
  - Total: 568
  - Density: 78.2/km^{2} (203/sq mi)
- -11.4% Population decrease from 2016 (641)
- Time zone: UTC−07:00 (PT)
- Postal code: V0K 1K0
- Area code: 250
- Highways: 97
- Website: village.clinton.bc.ca

Clinton is a village in British Columbia, Canada, located approximately 40 km (25 mi) northwest of Cache Creek and 30 km south of 70 Mile House.

It is considered by some to straddle the southern edge of the Cariboo country of British Columbia, although others consider Ashcroft-Cache Creek, Lillooet, Savona, Kamloops and even Lytton and Spences Bridge to be in the Cariboo. Clinton, however, does sit immediately below the southern edge of the Cariboo Plateau. Clinton has a number of attractions including horse-back riding, big game viewing, hiking, fishing and other outdoor activities.

Every May, Clinton is home to the Annual Ball held on the Victoria Day weekend, where many people dress as the first settlers did. The Annual Ball kicks off the Village's Heritage week with the parade and the May rodeo and dance ending Heritage week. The Clinton Annual Ball is one of British Columbia's oldest continual events having first been held in 1867 and was a highlight of the social calendar in the British Columbia Interior for many decades. The Clinton Museum, built in 1892, has a number of historical artifacts on display that date back to the gold rush and founding of the area.

== Name origin ==
Originally known as Cut-Off Valley, "47 Mile House" or "47 Mile", Clinton was named in 1863 upon completion of the Cariboo Wagon Road in the area for Henry Fiennes Pelham Clinton, the 5th Duke of Newcastle, who was colonial secretary in 1854 and from 1859 to 1864.

== Demographics ==
In the 2021 Census of Population conducted by Statistics Canada, Clinton had a population of 568 living in 291 of its 336 total private dwellings, a change of −11.4% from its 2016 population of 641. With a land area of 8.14 km^{2} (3.14 sq mi), it had a population density of 69.8/km^{2} (180.7/sq mi) in 2021.

The subdistrict of Clinton had a population of 388 in 1891.

== Transportation ==
Highway 97 runs through the village north to south, connecting the town to nearby cities like Kamloops and Kelowna. The town has BC Transit as well as Ebus transit coverage. The closest regional airport is the Cache Creek Airport, which is just south of the town, and the closest international airport is the Kelowna International Airport.
