= Cache Creek, British Columbia =

Cache Creek
- Village
- Village of Cache Creek
- Location of Cache Creek, British Columbia
- Coordinates: 50°48′50″N 121°19′36″W
- Country: Canada
- Province: British Columbia
- Regional district: Thompson-Nicola
- First settled: 1862
- Incorporated as a water district: 1959
- Incorporated as a Municipality: Nov. 28 1967

Government
  - Type: Elected village council
  - Mayor: Wendy Coomber
  - Governing body: Cache Creek Village Council

Area
  - Land: 10.40 km^{2} (4.02 sq mi)
- Elevation: 396 m (1,299 ft)

Population (2021)
  - Total: 969
  - Density: 93.2/km^{2} (241/sq mi)
- Time zone: UTC−07:00 (PT)
- Postal code: V0K1H0
- Area code: 250 / 778 / 236
- Highways: Highway 1 (TCH) Trans-Canada Highway; Highway 97; Highway 97C
- Website: cachecreek.ca

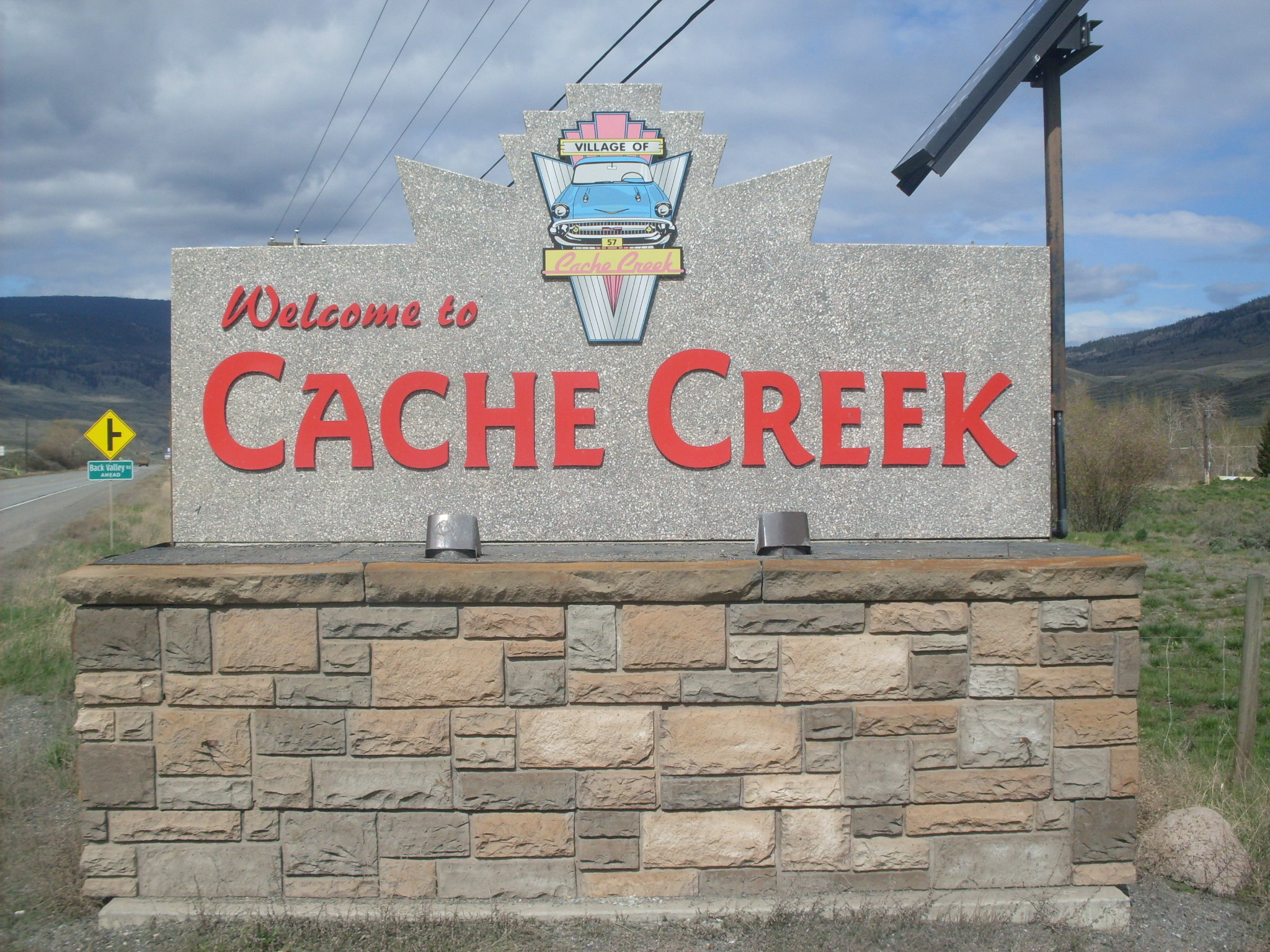
Cache Creek's welcome sign

Cache Creek is a historic transportation junction and incorporated village 354 kilometres (220 mi) northeast of Vancouver in British Columbia, Canada. It is on the Trans-Canada Highway in the province of British Columbia at a junction with Highway 97. The same intersection and the town that grew around it was at the point on the Cariboo Wagon Road where a branch road, and previously only a trail, led east to Savona's Ferry on Kamloops Lake. This community is also the point at which a small stream, once known as Riviere de la Cache, joins the Bonaparte River.

== History ==
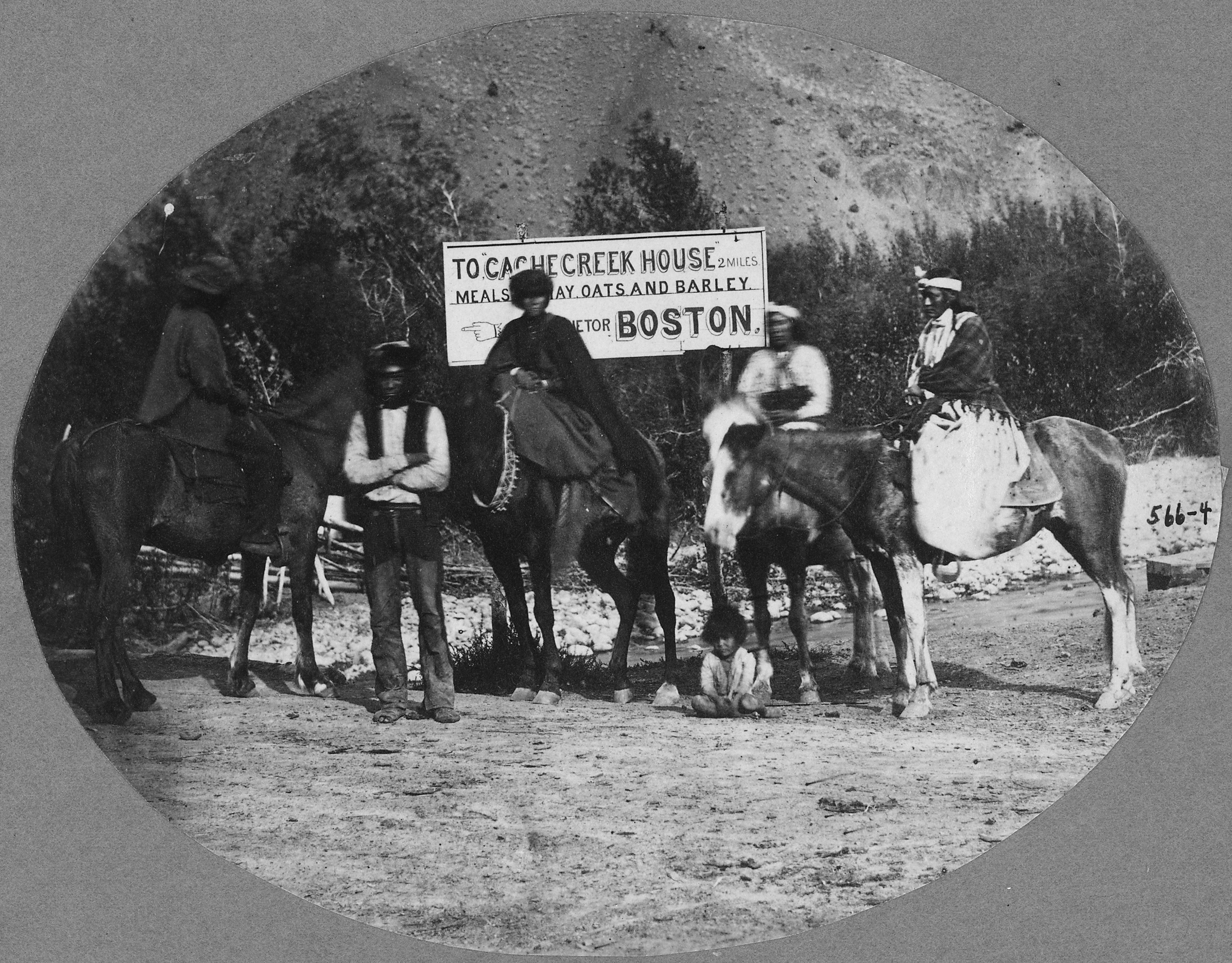
Bonaparte River Natives on horseback, 2 miles (3.2 km) from Cache Creek

The name is derived, apparently, from a cache or buried and hidden supply and trade goods depot used by the fur traders of either the Hudson's Bay Company or its rival the North West Company. In 1891, the Cache Creek subdistrict had a population of 697. Although it was first incorporated as a Local Water District with the name Cache Creek in 1959, and later incorporated as a municipality in 1967, the name has been associated with this community since long before incorporation. The Cache Creek post office was established in 1868.

Although still very active with traffic, Cache Creek was extremely busy for a few decades before the Trans-Canada Highway was superseded by the newer and shorter Coquihalla Highway, which bypasses the Fraser and Thompson Canyons between Hope and Kamloops via Merritt, about 97 kilometres (60 mi) southeast.

The nearby fossil locality, the McAbee fossil beds, is noted for the wide diversity of Eocene plants and animals preserved in the shale, including the extinct plants Dillhoffia and Trochodendron drachukii. The town lends its name to significant geological features, dating back to the Carboniferous, whose rocks are exposed in the area, Cache Creek terrane and Cache Creek Ocean.

The town was evacuated during the 2017 Elephant Hill fire, which burned over several outlying communities nearby. Damage to the forest ecosystem has led to increased and destructive flooding in the town.

== Demographics ==
In the 2021 Census of Population conducted by Statistics Canada, Cache Creek had a population of 969 living in 471 of its 522 total private dwellings, a change of 0.6% from its 2016 population of 963. With a land area of 10.4 km^{2} (4.0 sq mi), it had a population density of 93.2/km^{2} (241.3/sq mi) in 2021.

== Media ==
The town is also served by CFMA-FM 105.9, a community radio station run by the Ash-Creek Television Society.

== See also ==
- Cache Creek terrane
