= Chilcotin (disambiguation) =

Chilcotin, meaning "people of the red ochre river" may refer to:

- The Tsilhqot'in (also called the Chilcotin), an Athabaskan First Nations people of British Columbia, Canada
- Chilcotin language, the language spoken by the Tsilhqot'in
- The Chilcotin Country, a region in British Columbia also known as "the Chilcotin"
- The Chilcotin River, a river in British Columbia
- Chilcotin Lake, a lake in British Columbia
- The Chilcotin War of 1864
- Fort Chilcotin, a 19th-century outpost of the Hudson's Bay Company
- The Chilcotin Ranges, a group of mountain ranges in British Columbia
- Chilcotin Plateau, a sub-plateau of the Fraser Plateau in British Columbia
- Chilcotin Group, a group of volcanic rocks in British Columbia
- Chilcotin Forest, a community west of Williams Lake, British Columbia
- Coast Chilcotin, a Canadian federal electoral district, 1968-1979
- Cariboo—Chilcotin, a Canadian federal electoral district, 1979-2003
- Cariboo Chilcotin Coast, a regional-marketing division of Tourism British Columbia
- Chilcotin (sternwheeler), a paddle steamer from the upper Fraser River in British Columbia
- Canadian Forces Camp Chilcotin, a Canadian Forces training camp in the Chilcotin District
- Chilcoten, later Chilcotin, was the original post office name for Riske Creek, British Columbia
