= Nkwala =

Nkwala may be a reference to:

- Nicola (chief), a.k.a. Nkwala, a prominent chief of the Okanagan, Shuswap and Nicola peoples in British Columbia
- Nicola people, a group of people named after their founder, Chief Nicola
- Nkwala, a novel by Edith L. Sharp, winner of the Governor General's Award for Juvenile Fiction in 1958.
- Mount Nkwala, a mountain in the Okanagan Valley of British Columbia named for the novel by Edith L. Sharp
