= Johnny Ussher =

John Tannatt Ussher (1830-1879) was a settler, provincial magistrate and Gold Commissioner in the Thompson Country of the Southern Interior of British Columbia, Canada in the 1870s. John Tannatt Ussher was the son of Samuel Ussher Esq., a lawyer in Montreal, and Harriet Rebecca Colclough. He was born October 17, 1830.

On June 2, 1876 Ussher was named as a tax collector under the School Tax Act. On June 22, 1876, the Lieutenant-Governor in Council announced the appointment of John Ussher, Esq. to be Returning Officer for the District of Yale. The Provincial Secretary's office announced on January 27, 1877 that Johnny was appointed as Government Agent at Kamloops, and registrar for births, deaths and marriages, and land agents.

Johnny Ussher married Annie Clara McIntosh, the youngest sister of his business partner James McIntosh, on October 21, 1878.

In 1879 the renegade sons of former Fort Kamloops Chief Trader Donald McLean, led by his eldest son Allan and accompanied by their friend Alex Hare, went on a drunken rampage across the Nicola and Thompson Countries. The "Wild McLeans" went on a binge of horse-thievery and stealing flour, liquor, ammunition and clothing. Ussher, whose duties as Gold Commissioner included the roles of constable and jailer as well as magistrate and who had previously demurred on arresting the McLeans, as attempts to hold them in the flimsy jail in Kamloops would prove futile, rode out with John McLeod, with Amni Shumway as guide, and rancher William Palmer, whose prize stallion the McLeans had stolen.

Ussher and his party surprised the McLeans at a camp north of Brigade Hill on the benchlands west of the Nicola Valley on 8 December 1879, and Ussher was killed during a scuffle with Alex Hare, who slashed him with a knife before Archie McLean shot him in the head. McLeod and Allan McLean were also wounded. Fleeing the consequences of Ussher's killing, the McLeans sought refuge with the Nicola people and made a speech to their chief Chilliheetza, son of the famous Chief Nicola, trying to enlist their support in a revived version of the abortive uprising planned by the Interior First Nations peoples in 1874. Chilliheetza refused, knowing that the boys' motivation was not political but caused by drink, and chastised them for their shameful behaviour. On December 13 the McLeans and Hare surrendered and were brought to the BC Penitentiary in New Westminster to await trial. They were, after a second trial had to be held because of technicalities, hanged for the murder of Johnny Ussher and sheepherder James Kelly on January 31, 1881.

Ussher Lake, immediately north of the location of the battle, is named for him.

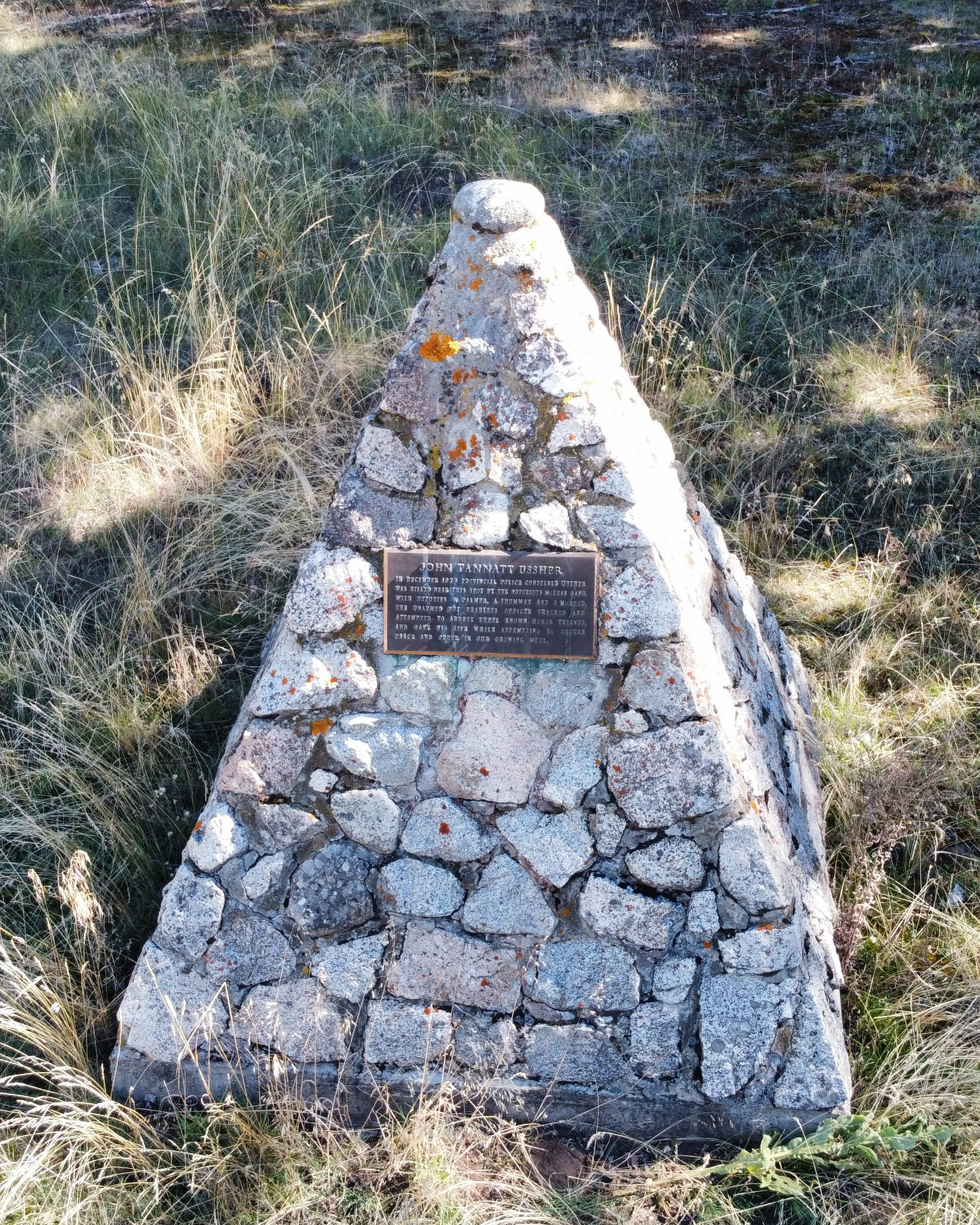
Johnny Ussher memorial cairn near Brigade Hill

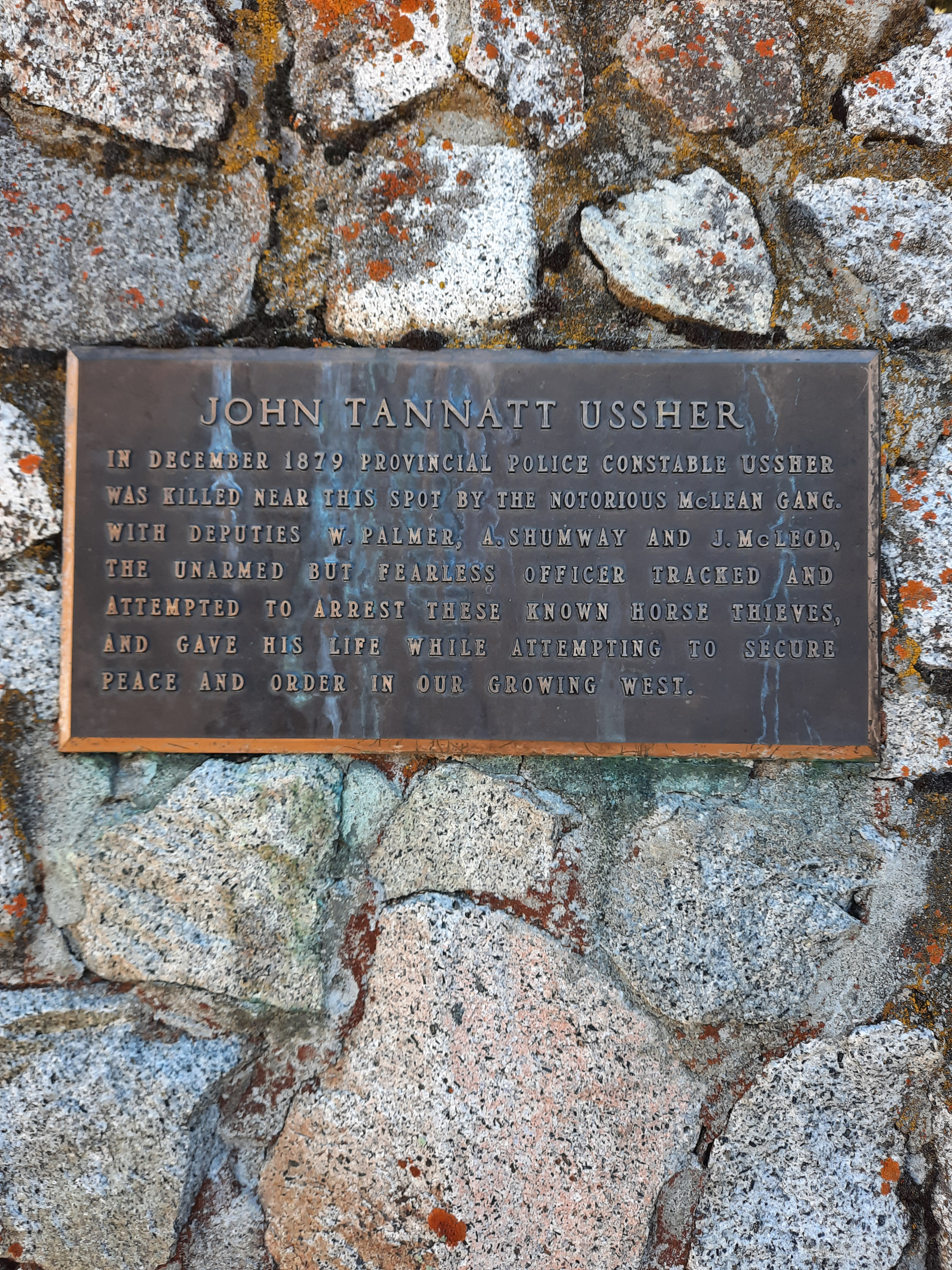
plaque on the Johnny Ussher cairn near Brigade Hill

A memorial cairn was placed at the site of the battle in 1967, sponsored by the BC Police Veterans Association.

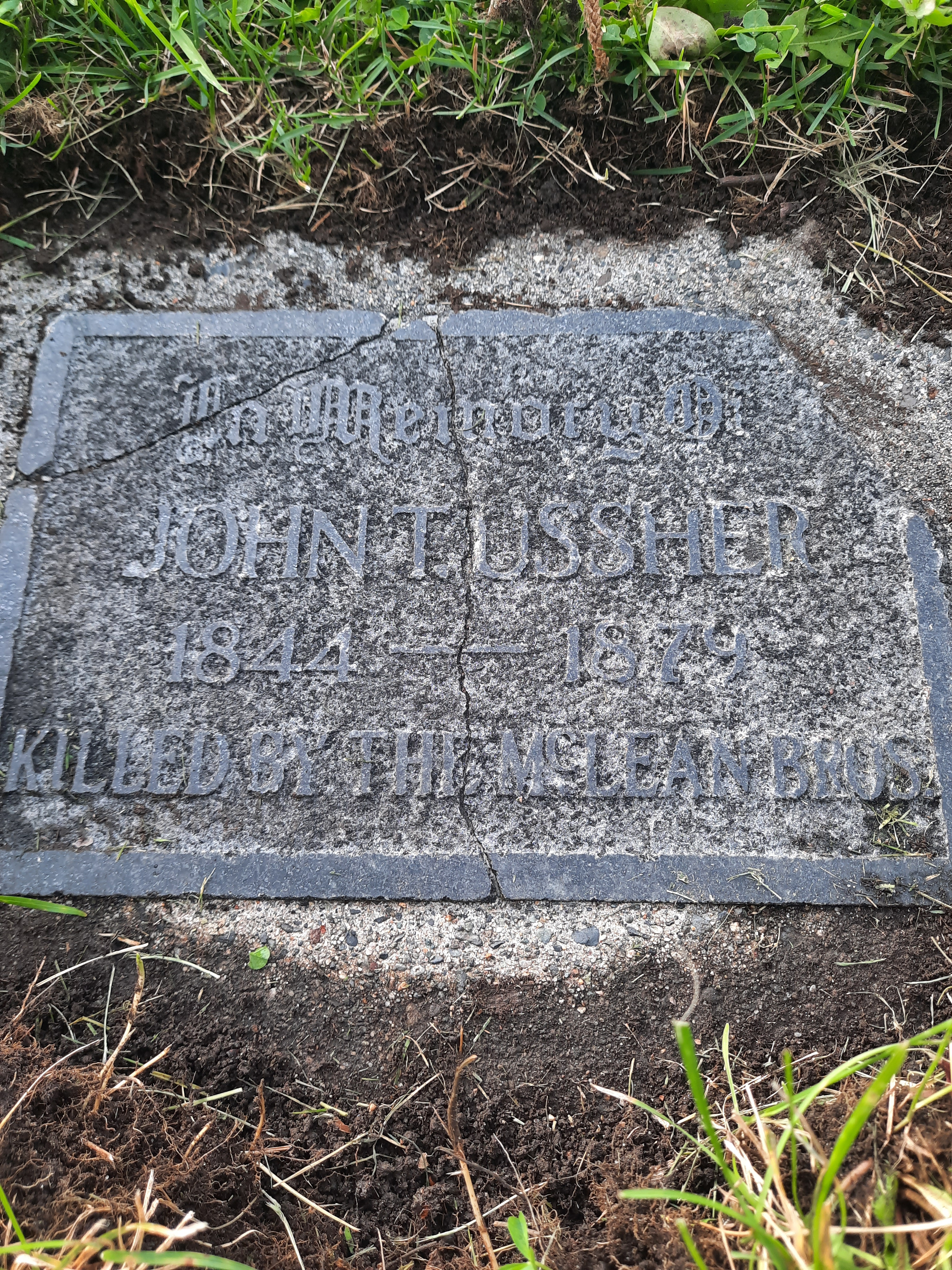
John Ussher gravestone

== See also ==
- Gold Commissioner
- John Andrew Mara
