= William George Cox =

Canadian politician

William George Cox (ca. 1821 – 6 October 1878) was Gold Commissioner for the Cariboo and Boundary Districts in the Colony of British Columbia, Canada during the Rock Creek Gold Rush. He was born in Ireland.

Cox was among the war party raised in the Cariboo during the Chilcotin War, riding west from Alexandria, British Columbia with 50 men raised in the goldfields to meet the corresponding party of the New Westminster Rifle Corps, mostly former Royal Engineers, led by Governor Seymour and Chief Constable Brew, who had disembarked from HMS Sutlej at Bella Coola and entered the Chilcotin District from the west.

Cox, who is described by BC historians G.P.V. and Helen B. Akrigg as "friendly, genial and easy-going", encamped at Puntzi Lake on June 12, 1864, four days after leaving Alexandria, and did not very much in advance of the arrival of Seymour's and Brew's contingent other than build minor fortifications. The leader of the Tsilhqot'in revolt, Klatassine or Klatsassan, was actually in the vicinity of Puntzi Lake when Cox arrived, but slipped away from the area. Rather than attempt pursuit Cox whiled away a month at Puntzi Lake, using up expensive supplies and much to the later chagrin of his seniors in government, sent for more. Cox rationalized that he had been at the site waiting for Chief Alexis, to whom he had sent a message and for whom he had sent out a party to seek him at Chilcotin Forks, and that without this powerful Tsilhqot'in chief on-side there was little he could do but wait for the Governor's party.

As the Akriggs comment, "One can imagine the blistering contempt Sir James Douglas would have expressed if Cox had given such a report to him" (had Douglas still been Governor). Governor Seymour, nonplussed by Cox's excuse, sent him and his troops to Tatla Lake to search for the warring members of the Tsilhqot'in. Cox's party was joined soon after by former Fort Kamloops Chief Trader, Donald McLean, but McLean was frustrated by Cox's incompetence and set out on his own foray near the northern end of Chilko Lake where he was surprised from behind by Klatassine, who fired a shot into McLean's back, which was unprotected by the iron skillet he customarily wore under the front of his shirt, killing him.

Cox was discouraged at the death of McLean, who was a noted and self-touted "Indian killer", and wanted to abandon the pursuit but Governor Seymour insisted he persevere in the hunt, partly because given the expense of the expedition he had to have something to account for upon his return to the capital. As luck would have it, the rebel Tshilqot'in warriors walked into Cox's camp, which by then was on the site of the former Fort Chilcotin, a long-defunct Hudson's Bay Company fur-post, apparently in response to a message from Cox which seemed to promise them "amnesty in time of war". The Governor and his officials, however, had made no such promise and Klatassine and his men were arrested and eventually tried and hanged for murder at Qiesnellemouthe (today's Quesnel).

In 1867, Cox was among those who pushed for the selection of Victoria as the capital of the newly united colonies, partly by opposing a dredging plan for New Westminster, whose faults as prospective capital included the difficulty of navigating the sandbars and shoals of the lowermost Fraser. In 1868, Cox was among those who opposed an address to the Queen prepared by John Robson, Amor de Cosmos, Edward Stamp and G.A.B. Walkem and mandated by mass meetings in New Westminster and at Yale (known as the Yale Convention) in regards to joining Canada, as they opposed the terms proposed. Others opposing were Henry Pering Pellew Crease, Joseph Trutch, Joseph Despard Pemberton, John Sebastian Helmcken, Thomas Elwyn, Henry Maynard Ball and Messrs Wood, Ker, Smith, and Spalding.
