= Cheẑichʼed Biny =

Coordinates: 52°20′26″N 124°02′59″W

- Chilcotin Lake

- Location within British Columbia
- Location: Chilcotin District, British Columbia
- Primary inflows: Chilcotin River, Palmer Creek
- Primary outflows: Chilcotin River
- Basin countries: Canada
- Max. length: 5.3 km (3.3 mi)
- Max. width: 1.0 km (0.62 mi)
- Surface area: 3.687 km^{2} (1.424 sq mi)
- Shore length^{1}: 22.1 km (13.7 mi)
- Surface elevation: 3,241 ft (988 m)
- Islands: None
- Settlements: None
- ^{1} Shore length is not a well-defined measure.

Cheẑichʼed Biny, known as Chilcotin Lake, is a lake in the Chilcotin District of the Central Interior of British Columbia, Canada. It is located on the Chilcotin River to the north of Puntzi Lake.

The name is derived from that of the Chilcotin River, which in turn is derived from an anglicization of Tsilhqotʼin, the name of the local indigenous people, whose name in their language means "People of the rocks".

The community of Chezacut (Cheẑichʼed in Tsilhqotʼin language) is located on the north shore of the lake, as is Chezacut Cemetery Indian Reserve No. 5 nearby. Many other reserves of the Alexis Creek First Nation are also in the vicinity, generally to the west and northwest.

== See also ==
- List of lakes of British Columbia
- Chilcotin (disambiguation)
