= Donald McLean (fur trader) =

Scottish fur trader and explorer

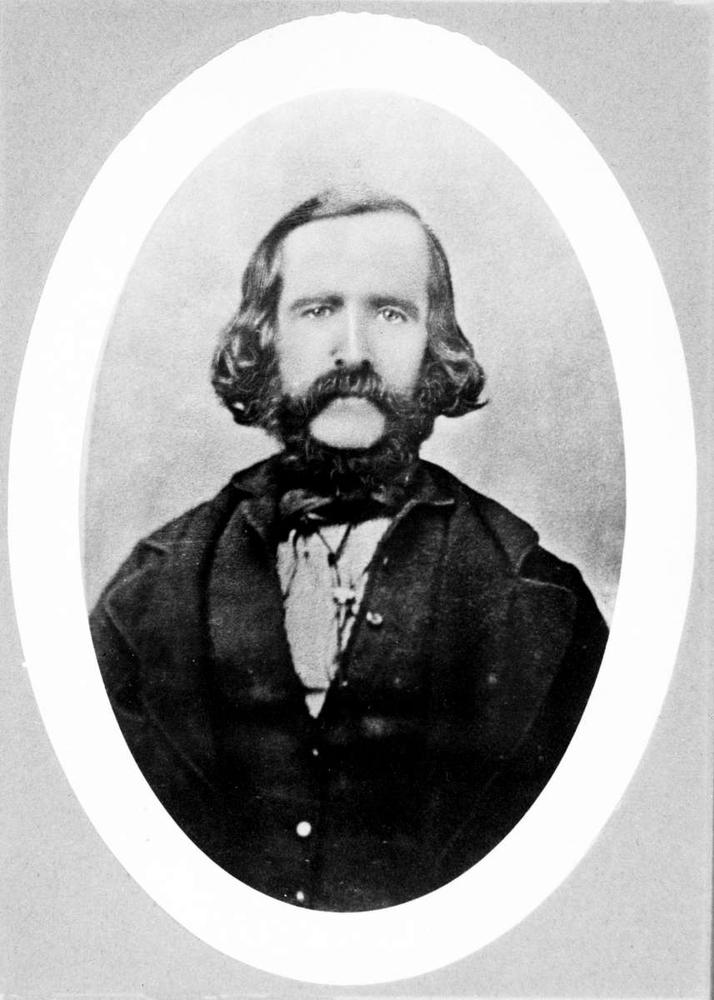
- Donald McLean ca. 1860
- Born: 1805; Tobermory, Isle of Mull, Scotland
- Died: July 17, 1864 (aged 58–59); Chilcotin, British Columbia
- Occupations: Fur trader, explorer, cattle rancher

Donald McLean (1805 – July 17, 1864), also known as Samadlin, a First Nations adaptation of Sieur McLean, was a Scottish fur trader and explorer for the Hudson's Bay Company and who later became a cattle rancher near Cache Creek in British Columbia's Thompson Country. McLean was the last casualty of the Chilcotin War of 1864 and the father of outlaw and renegade Allan McLean, leader of the "Wild McLean Boys" gang.

== Biography ==
McLean was born in 1805 in Tobermory, Isle of Mull, Scotland to Christina and Alexander McLean. In 1812 Donald and his family left Scotland to join Selkirk's Red River Settlement, in what became Manitoba, Canada. There they struggled to survive in an inhospitable land surrounded by conflict (between the HBC, NWC, fur traders and native factions). Alexander McLean was killed at the Battle of Seven Oaks on June 19, 1816, and what remained of the original settler's disbanded. Donald, his siblings and his mother returned to Scotland.

He joined the Hudson's Bay Company in 1833 as an apprentice clerk in the company's Western Department. In 1835 he was with expeditions to the Snake River country west of the Rockies led by Thomas McKay and John McLeod. He was assigned to Fort Colville, under Chief Trader Archibald McDonald in 1839, and in 1840 was transferred to Flathead Post. Two years later, he was sent to the New Caledonia Fur District in now north-central British Columbia, and was, at different times, in charge of Forts Chilcotin, Babine, and McLeod. He also worked at Fort Alexandria under Donald Manson.

McLean was appointed Chief Trader in 1853, taking charge of Thompson's River Post (today's Kamloops) in 1855, expanding its cattle and horse herds and managing unruly relations with indigenous peoples sternly, acquiring a reputation both for fairness and severity. It was during McLean's rule of the post that the first finds of gold were brought into the fort by local native peoples. The news which was carefully guarded, but eventually touched off the Fraser River Gold Rush.

McLean was known as "Samadlin" to his indigenous customers and friends, which is a corruption of Sieur McLean, which is how he was addressed by his French-Canadian underlings at the fur posts.. McLean's brutal practices - he was an adherent of an informal company policy known as "Club Law" - and various insubordinations led to him being called to company regional headquarters in Victoria in 1860 and ultimately to his resignation in 1861.

During his tenure at Thompson's River Post, McLean had established a ranch in the hills northwest of Cache Creek. He now moved there with his family, ranching, prospecting, and running a roadhouse on the Cariboo Road at Lower Hat Creek (now a heritage museum and visitor attraction).

McLean came out of retirement during the Chilcotin War of 1864 to assist in the hunt for Chief Klattasine. Chafing at being under the putative command of William George Cox, who was in charge of non-military forces in the campaign, McLean set out from the expedition's encampment near Puntzi Lake on his own to track Klattasine through the country around Chilko and Taseko Lakes.

Klattasine targeted McLean for death in retaliation for his brutal "club law" treatment of Tsilhqot'in people and for revealing Tsilhqot'in trails to Cox's militia units. Klattasine lured McLean away from the camp near Choelquoit Lake. On July 17, 1864, as McLean opened his steel mesh vest to cool off Nezunlhtsin, a Tsilhqot'in warrior, shot and killed him. Chief Klattasine was surprised at how easily McLean had been killed because of his reputation for invincibility. Donald McLean's grave site is located in the Chilcotin near to where he was killed.

== Legacy ==
McLean's ranch, now known as Hat Creek Ranch still stands near Cache Creek as a historical attraction. Named for him are McLean Lake (west of Cache Creek) and Mount McLean, the highest summit on Mission Ridge on the north side of Seton Lake just west of Lillooet.

Donald McLean was married three times, fathering 11 children.

In the decade after his death, McLean's son by his third wife, Sophia, Allan McLean (1855-1881), went on a rampage with his brothers Charley (1862-1881) and Archie (1864-1881) and a friend, Alex Hare, through the Nicola Country, killing settler and gold commissioner John Tannatt Ussher in cold blood. They became known as the Wild McLean Boys". Allen, his brothers and Alex Hare were captured and brought to the British Columbia Penitentiary for trial by Chief Justice Matthew Baillie Begbie (who had also tried Klattasine), were convicted in 1879 and hung for murder in 1881.

George McLean, a son of Allan McLean, was decorated with a Distinguished Conduct Medal in 1917 for bravery for single-handedly killing 19 Germans at Vimy Ridge and is considered a Canadian war hero.

Alexander McLean, Donald's youngest son with his first wife, Ali, owned and ran Black Pine Ranch in northern Kamloops, British Columbia.

Among McLean's many descendants, Mel Rothenburger, former mayor of Kamloops, is a writer in BC history, including a book on The Chilcotin War and another about "The Wild McLeans"
