= Klattasine =

Chilcotin war chief

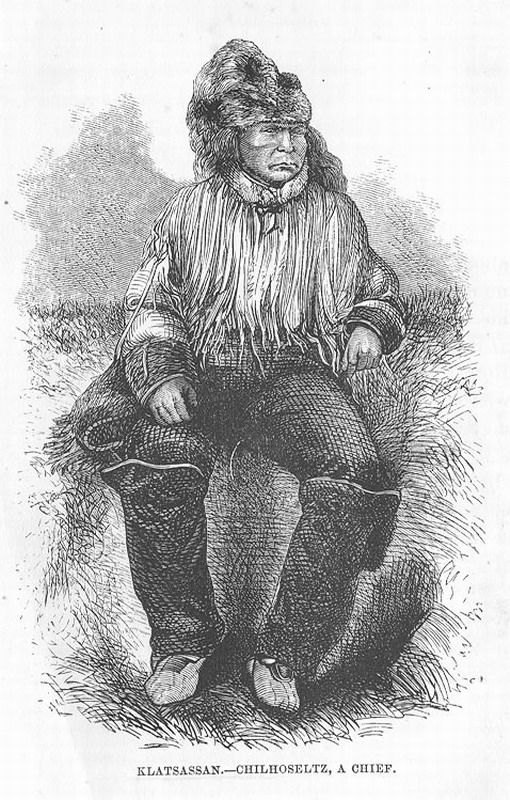
- Depiction of Lhatŝʼaŝʔin, of uncertain authenticity
- Born: Date of birth unknown Chilcotin Country
- Died: October 26, 1864; Quesnel, British Columbia
- Title: Chief of the Chilcotin People
- Criminal charges: Murder
- Criminal penalty: Execution by hanging
- Criminal status: Posthumously exonerated

Lhatŝ’aŝʔin (also known as Klatsassan or Klattasine; died 1864), was a chief of the Chilcotin (Tsilhqot'in) people. He led a small group of warriors in attacks on road-building crews near Bute Inlet, British Columbia, in April and May 1864. The road crews had been starving and underpaying Tsilhqot'in workers, which provoked Lhatŝ’aŝʔin to declare war. On 29 April 1864, Lhatŝ’aŝʔin arrived at a ferry site 30 mi (48 km) up the Homathko River. He and his warriors killed ferry-keeper Tim Smith, plundering the food and stores kept there.

The next day, Lhatŝ’aŝʔin attacked the unsuspecting and unarmed road workers at the main camp, killing 9. Further up the trail, the band came upon foreman William Brewster and three of his men. All were killed, Brewster's body being mutilated and left while the other three were thrown in the river. The band also killed William Manning, a settler at Puntzi Lake. Proceeding into the interior to escape justice, Lhatŝ’aŝʔin and his followers ambushed a pack-train led by Alexander McDonald; three more white workers were killed. In all, 19 white settlers were killed by Lhatŝ’aŝʔin and followers.

Lhatŝ’aŝʔin and his followers were captured on August 11, 1864, under false pretenses of peace parley to end the Chilcotin War. They were shackled and tried as murderers, and were hanged at Quesnellemouth (Quesnel, B.C.) on October 26, 1864. Lhatŝ’aŝʔin and his fellow war chiefs were exonerated for any crime or wrongdoing on October 23, 2014, by British Columbia Premier Christy Clark.

== See also ==
- Chilcotin War
- William George Cox
- Frederick Seymour
- Chartres Brew
- Donald McLean
- Alfred Waddington
- Fort Chilcotin
- Nicola (chief)
- Chief Hunter Jack
