= Chezacut =

- Location of Chezacut in British Columbia
- Coordinates: 52°21′00″N 124°03′00″W
- Country: Canada
- Province: British Columbia
- Area codes: 250, 778

Chezacut /ˈtʃɛzəkət/ is an unincorporated ranching settlement and former post office in the Chilcotin District of the Central Interior of British Columbia, Canada. Its name means "bird without wings" in the Chilcotin language. It is located on the north shore of Chilcotin Lake near the confluence of the Chilcotin and Clusko Rivers, 43 kilometers northwest of the community of Alexis Creek.

Chezacut Cemetery Indian Reserve No. 5 is nearby, located at
