= List of governors of Vancouver Island and British Columbia =

The following is a list of governors of the Colony of Vancouver Island and the British Columbia colony in its first and second iterations.

== Colony of Vancouver Island ==
Governors of Vancouver Island	Term
Richard Blanshard	1849–1851
Sir James Douglas	1851–1864
Sir Arthur Edward Kennedy	1864–1866

== Mainland Colony of British Columbia ==
Governors of British Columbia (1858–1866)	Term
Sir James Douglas	1858–1864
Frederick Seymour	1864–1866

== United Colony of British Columbia ==
Governors of British Columbia (1866–1871)	Term
Frederick Seymour	1866–1869
Sir Anthony Musgrave	1869–1871

== See also ==
- List of lieutenant governors of British Columbia
- Colony of the Queen Charlotte Islands
- Stickeen Territories
