= Puntzi Lake =

Lake in British Columbia, Canada

- Location within British Columbia
- Location: Chilcotin District, Central Interior of British Columbia
- Coordinates: 52°12′00″N 124°00′00″W
- Primary inflows: Puntzi Creek
- Primary outflows: Puntzi Creek
- Basin countries: Canada
- Max. length: 11 kilometres (6.8 mi)
- Max. width: 3.2 kilometres (2.0 mi)
- Surface area: 17.06 km^{2} (6.59 sq mi)
- Average depth: 22.8 m (75 ft)
- Max. depth: 44.2 m (145 ft)
- Water volume: 1.006 km^{3} (0.241 cu mi)
- Shore length^{1}: 16.935 km (10.523 mi)
- Surface elevation: 956 m (3,136 ft)
- ^{1} Shore length is not a well-defined measure.

Puntzi Lake is a lake in the Chilcotin District of the Central Interior of British Columbia. It is located on the western side of the upper Chilcotin River to the northeast of Tatla Lake, and is connected to the Chilcotin River via Puntzi Creek, of which it is an expansion. The area around the lake has been the setting for many important events in the history of the region.

== History ==
One of the larger lakes in the central Chilcotin, the lake is in the heart of the traditional territory of the Tsilhqot'in people and was the site of a large village. This village was devastated by the 1862 Pacific Northwest smallpox epidemic, in which native populations were reduced by 50-90% of their former totals. In the wake of the epidemic, Reverend Turner, one of early British Columbia's "saddlebag parsons", came through the village, finding only a few children and elders huddled in some of the underground houses, but in other houses there were only the dead; others had been thrown in the lake, which had frozen. The survivors told Turner about a huge beast of some kind which came down off the icecaps and dug up the bodies out of the other houses and out of the frozen lake. The village was never fully repopulated, although there is an Indian reserve of today's Alexis Creek First Nation on its shore, Puntzi Lake Indian Reserve No. 2, as well as several others nearby.

By 1864 a white settler had taken up a pre-emption around the lake. This settler was one of the first casualties of the Chilcotin War. During that conflict, the lake became the setting for the encampment of the assembled forces of the Colonies, which consisted of troops from Victoria, accompanying Governor Frederick Seymour and his officials, and a posse of mostly Americans raised from the Cariboo goldfields but also including Donald McLean, former Chief Trader at the HBC's Fort Kamloops who came out of retirement to join in the hunt for the leaders of the Tsilhqot'in revolt and who would in the course of events die near the lake. It was at a meadow in this area where the Tsilhqot'in war-leader Klatassine surrendered

In the early 1950s nearby Puntzi Mountain became the site of a radar station of the Pinetree Line with a large airport and base built in the area. The runway still operates today as CYPU and was, at the time, the second-longest airstrip in British Columbia. Eventually the base was turned over to Canada and operated in to the mid-1960s.

== See also ==
- List of lakes of British Columbia
