= Mount Nkwala =

Mountain in British Columbia, Canada

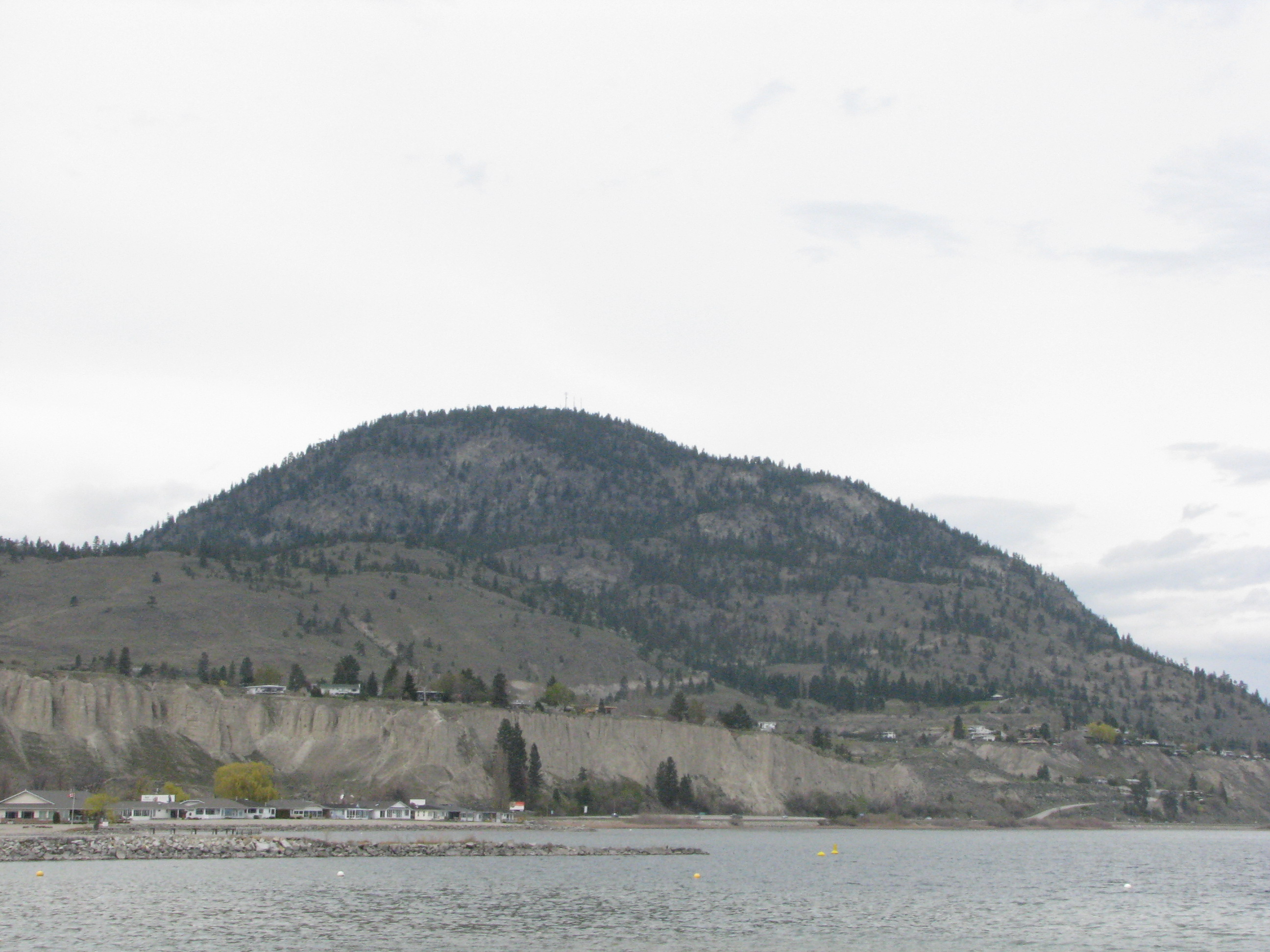
- A view from near the S.S.Sicamous in Penticton.

Highest point
- Elevation: 1,019 m (3,343 ft)
- Prominence: 469 m (1,539 ft)
- Listing: Mountains of British Columbia
- Coordinates: 49°51′14″N 119°34′53″W

Geography
- Location within British Columbia
- Interactive map of Mount Nkwala
- Location: British Columbia, Canada
- District: Osoyoos Division Yale Land District
- Parent range: Thompson Plateau
- Topo map: NTS 82E12 Summerland

Mount Nkwala is a mountain in the Okanagan Valley of the Southern Interior of British Columbia, located immediately west of and overlooking the city of Penticton and the south end of Okanagan Lake.

== Name origin ==
It was named after Chief Nkwala / Chief Nicolas Hwistesmetxēe'qen is a very influential Indigenous Chief in the Nicola Valley area. Born 1780, died 1865. The former name, Niggertoe Mountain, has its roots in a story from Christmas Day, 1908, as recounted in the British Columbia Geographical Names Information System entry:

"When or by whom this name was given is not on record. The origin seems to be a tragic affair that began on Christmas Day, 1908, when three negroes, Charles Blair, cook, Arthur Wilson, his assistant, and Arthur Chapman, waiter, all employed at the Hotel Summerland, got lost in a snowstorm while returning from Mass at Penticton. One of them was thrown from his horse and efforts by the others to catch it led to their being thrown too. Blair had been drinking and was unable to travel afoot. Wilson and Chapman wandered about looking for one another or help until night came on. Chapman fell asleep from exhaustion and Blair from his liquor—never to awaken—their bodies being found near the foot of the mountain the next day. Inquest verdict; death from exposure. Wilson, the survivor, [had] slept less and moved about more than the others, eventually reaching Summerland." (12th Report of the Okanagan Historical Society, 1948, citing Summerland Review, 2 January 1909)

Locally, Mount Nkwala is known as Gerry Mountain. Dennis McDonald mapped the mountain in 1949 for the BC Forest Service and named it after his wife Geraldine. The forest fire look-out station operated until 1969 and was known as Gerry Look-Out.

== See also ==
- Nicola (chief), aka Nkwala
- Nicola people, aka the Nkwala people
