= Chilcotin Forest =

- Location of Chilcotin Forest in British Columbia
- Coordinates: 52°07′00″N 122°34′00″W
- Country: Canada
- Province: British Columbia
- Area codes: 250, 778

Chilcotin Forest is an unincorporated settlement in the Chilcotin District of the Central Interior of British Columbia, Canada. It is located near Canadian Forces Camp Chilcotin and was also originally named Ninkynee, meaning "Indian's Own" in the Chilcotin language, a reference to it being the location of the Chilcotin Forest Indian Training Centre, but this name was met with opposition by local non-native residents shortly after its designation in 1967.

== Climate ==
There is a weather station at Twan Lake, which is about 30 km (19 mi) north of Chilcotin Forest, on the Chilcotin Plateau.Like much of the Chilcotin Plateau, Twan Lake has a subarctic climate (Köppen Dfc), with relatively low precipitation.

Climate data for Twan Creek, BC (1981-2010): 914m
| Month | Jan | Feb | Mar | Apr | May | Jun | Jul | Aug | Sep | Oct | Nov | Dec | Year |
|---|---|---|---|---|---|---|---|---|---|---|---|---|---|
| Record high °C (°F) | 11.5 (52.7) | 14.0 (57.2) | 18.5 (65.3) | 25.0 (77.0) | 34.5 (94.1) | 32.0 (89.6) | 34.5 (94.1) | 33.5 (92.3) | 35.0 (95.0) | 26.5 (79.7) | 14.5 (58.1) | 14.0 (57.2) | 35.0 (95.0) |
| Mean daily maximum °C (°F) | −3.1 (26.4) | 1.1 (34.0) | 5.9 (42.6) | 11.6 (52.9) | 16.7 (62.1) | 20.1 (68.2) | 22.7 (72.9) | 22.4 (72.3) | 17.4 (63.3) | 9.6 (49.3) | 1.6 (34.9) | −3.6 (25.5) | 10.2 (50.4) |
| Daily mean °C (°F) | −9.0 (15.8) | −5.7 (21.7) | −1.2 (29.8) | 3.9 (39.0) | 8.7 (47.7) | 12.4 (54.3) | 14.4 (57.9) | 13.7 (56.7) | 9.2 (48.6) | 3.1 (37.6) | −3.4 (25.9) | −9.1 (15.6) | 3.1 (37.6) |
| Mean daily minimum °C (°F) | −14.7 (5.5) | −12.5 (9.5) | −8.4 (16.9) | −3.8 (25.2) | 0.6 (33.1) | 4.5 (40.1) | 6.1 (43.0) | 4.9 (40.8) | 1.0 (33.8) | −3.4 (25.9) | −8.3 (17.1) | −14.5 (5.9) | −4.0 (24.7) |
| Record low °C (°F) | −43.5 (−46.3) | −42.0 (−43.6) | −34.5 (−30.1) | −19.0 (−2.2) | −8.0 (17.6) | −4.0 (24.8) | −2.5 (27.5) | −7.0 (19.4) | −12.0 (10.4) | −34.0 (−29.2) | −35.0 (−31.0) | −46.5 (−51.7) | −46.5 (−51.7) |
| Average precipitation mm (inches) | 36.9 (1.45) | 17.7 (0.70) | 17.7 (0.70) | 21.2 (0.83) | 37.1 (1.46) | 64.4 (2.54) | 60.9 (2.40) | 48.2 (1.90) | 36.7 (1.44) | 33.5 (1.32) | 43.6 (1.72) | 38.8 (1.53) | 456.7 (17.99) |
| Average snowfall cm (inches) | 33.5 (13.2) | 16.0 (6.3) | 14.1 (5.6) | 6.5 (2.6) | 2.1 (0.8) | 0.0 (0.0) | 0.0 (0.0) | 0.0 (0.0) | 1.1 (0.4) | 8.5 (3.3) | 32.3 (12.7) | 37.7 (14.8) | 151.8 (59.7) |
Source: Environment Canada
