= Donna Milner =

Canadian writer (born 1946)

Donna Milner (September 3, 1946 - November 11, 2021) was a Canadian writer.

Milner was born and raised in Victoria BC. She lived in Williams Lake, British Columbia, with her husband Tom. Donna wrote and published the books After River, The Promise of Rain, Somewhere in Between, and A Place Called Sorry. She is often referred to as the "Oh, so Canadian author.

== Books ==
=== After River ===
Her 2008 book After River is, according to bcbooklook, "about a woman coming to terms with the disintegration of her family some 35 years after a young American draft resister named River crossed the border into Canada and changed their lives".

=== Somewhere In Between ===
Milner described this book as "the story of a family dealing with loss and tragedy". One of the characters in the book, Virgil Blue, was inspired by a one-time resident of Milner's home city of Williams Lake, British Columbia.

== Personal life ==
Milner was born in Victoria BC in 1946 and was raised in Vancouver. She moved to Rossland where she married and had children. Having previously worked as a realtor for 25 years, Milner said in a 2014 interview she and her husband had lived in the Cariboo for 40 years. She described that prefers writing in the morning and insists upon herself of writing at least two pages in longhand before she can leave the room. She used to go on writing retreats near Eagle Lake with a friend.

She died on November 11, 2021, after a short battle with cancer.

== Recognition ==
Her book After River was listed in a top five fiction books list by The Gettysburg Times in 2008, who described it as "beautifully written", while The Promise of Rain was listed in The Globe and Mail top 100 books in 2010. 9.

== Bibliography ==
- After River (2008)
- The Promise of Rain (2010)
- Somewhere In Between (2014)
- A Place Called Sorry (2015)
