= Chilcotin War =

Revolt in British Columbia in 1864

Date	1864
Location	British Columbia Interior (today part of Canada)

Belligerents
(British Columbia) Colony of British Columbia; White workers working for Alfred Waddington	Tsilhqot'in people

Commanders and leaders
Frederick Seymour; William George Cox; Chartres Brew; Donald McLean †	Chief Klattasine (executed); Chief Tellot (executed)

Casualties and losses
14–19 killed	15+ wounded and killed 5 arrested and hanged^{1}
- ^{1}The five arrested were allegedly tricked into meeting Colonial officials under the false pretense of a truce.

The Chilcotin War, or the Chilcotin Uprising, occurred in 1864 between members of the Tsilhqot'in (Chilcotin) people and the Colony of British Columbia. It began when fourteen settlers employed by Alfred Waddington in the building of a road from Bute Inlet through Tsilhqot'in territory were killed, as well as a number of men with a pack-train near Anahim Lake and a settler at Puntzi Lake.

Five Tsilhqot'in chiefs (Tellot, Klattasine, Tah-pitt, Piele, and Chessus) were arrested and charged with murder. In defence of their actions, Klattasine said they were waging a defensive war and not committing murder, although all five were found guilty and sentenced to hang.

== Background ==
The Tsilhqot'in, along with many other First Nations of the Pacific Northwest, had just been devastated by the 1862 Pacific Northwest smallpox epidemic. Some colonists saw the epidemic as an opportunity to take over First Nation lands. Many Indigenous peoples, including the Tsilhqot'in, believed that the epidemic had been deliberately spread among native peoples for the purpose of stealing their land, a claim that has largely been corroborated through the historical written record.

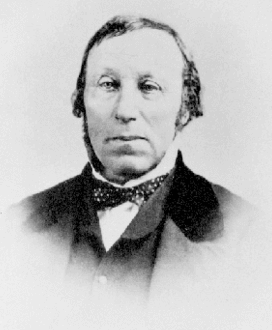
Alfred Waddington, 1864

In 1862, Alfred Waddington began lobbying the press and his political allies for support to build a wagon road from Bute Inlet to Fort Alexandria, where it would connect to the Cariboo Road and continue on to the goldfields at Barkerville. He received approval for the construction early in 1863. According to Waddington, it would reduce land travel from 359 miles (578 km) to 185 miles (298 km) and the total days consumed in packing freight from 37 days to 22 compared to the route through Yale and the Fraser Canyon known as the Cariboo Road and favoured by Governor Douglas. The Bute Inlet Wagon Road was to follow the Homathko River valley from its mouth at the head of Bute Inlet, then swing northeast across the Chilcotin Plateau to join the Bentinck Arm Trail at Puntzi Lake and the mouth of the Quesnel River. It was also one of the routes considered and advocated by Waddington for the transcontinental railway, which was eventually constructed to what became Vancouver instead.

== Outbreak of violence ==
The violence began when construction crews on Waddington's Road entered the territory of the Tsilhqot'in nation without permission, after members of the First Nation had been working on road construction and going without compensation, being repeatedly lied to, and near starvation. Construction had been underway for two years when, on April 29, 1864, a ferryman named Timothy Smith, stationed 30 miles up the river, was killed after refusing a demand from Chief Klattasine (Lhatŝ'aŝʔin; lit. 'nobody knows him' or 'we do not know his name'), Tellot and other Tsilhqot'in for food. Smith was shot and his body thrown into the river. His food stores and supplies were looted. A half ton of provisions were stolen. A skiff was chopped to pieces and the ferry scow set adrift, leaving only the cable over the river. The following day the Tsilhqot'in attacked the workers' camp at daylight. Three men, Peter A. Petersen, Edward Moseley and Philip Buckley, though injured (Moseley was unharmed), escaped and fled down the river. The remaining crew were killed and their bodies thrown into the river.

Four miles further up the trail, the band came upon the foreman, William Brewster, and three of his men blazing trail. All were killed. The band also killed William Manning, a settler at Puntzi Lake.

A pack train led by Alexander McDonald, though warned, continued into the area and three of the drivers were killed in the ensuing ambush. In all, nineteen men were killed.

In New Westminster, Governor Seymour, just a month into his term, received news of the attacks on May 14. The next day Chartres Brew and 28 men were sent to Bute Inlet aboard HMS Forward, but they were unable to make their way up the trail from the Homathko valley to the scene of the incident, and returned to New Westminster. A second party of 50 men under Gold Commissioner William Cox went to the area using an overland route, met an ambush and retreated. Brew, aboard HMS Sutlej, along with the Governor and 38 men, went out again to reach the Tsilhqot'in from Bentinck Arm. They arrived July 7 and met Cox. Donald McLean led a scouting party to reconnoitre. A guide, hearing a rifle click, urged him to get down; he did not heed the warning and was shot through the heart.

== Arrest and execution of Tsilhqot'in chiefs ==
In 1864, Chief Alexis and a slave of Klattasine met with Cox and were given assurances of friendship by him. Tsilhqot'in chiefs believed that they were going to attend peace talks. The next day Klattasine, Tellot and six others arrived and were arrested. Although denied by Cox, they claimed to have been offered immunity. The prisoners were returned to Alexandria. Five of the Tsilhqot'in men (Tellot, Klattasine, Tah-pitt, Piele, and Chessus) were arrested and charged with murder. They were tried in September 1864 at Quesnel at a trial by jury overseen by Judge Begbie. In defence of their actions, Klattasine said they were waging war, not committing murder. The five were found guilty and sentenced to hang. The day they were executed is now a day of mourning in the Tsilhqot'in Nation. The sixth chief, Chief ʔAhan was executed a year later, on July 18, in New Westminster.

The incident cost the colony about $80,000. A petition to the Imperial Parliament to share this cost was declined. Donald McLean's widow was given a pension of £100 per year for five years. Waddington sought compensation of $50,000 from the colony, saying that his party had been given no protection. The colony declined, saying that none was requested, and no state could guarantee its citizens safety from murder.

Waddington was of the view that fears of the introduction of smallpox was the cause of the unrest. Frederick Whymper, an artist attached to Waddington's crew, attributed the unrest to the provision of firearms to the Tsilhqot'in at a time when they were suffering from lack of food. Judge Begbie concluded that the most important cause of the unrest was concern over title to land rather than "plunder or revenge". Others say that the native packers in Brewster's crew were starving while the white members of the crew were well supplied. There were also grievances about desecration of graves and interference with valuable spring waters.

== Review of trial ==
The arrest, trial, and execution of the six Tsilhqot'in chiefs as criminals was challenged by the Tsilhqot'in Nation on the basis that the violence was a war between two sovereign nations. The Tsilhqot'in were acting to protect their lands, people, and way of life from the onslaught of road builders at the time. In 2018, Prime Minister Justin Trudeau stated that the chiefs were regarded as heroes to their people.

In 1993 Judge Anthony Sarich wrote a report commissioned by the government of British Columbia (BC), on an inquiry into the relationship between the Aboriginal community in BC and the justice system. As a result of the recommendations in the report, the Attorney General apologized for the hanging of the Tsilhqot'in chiefs and provided funding for an archaeological investigation to locate their graves. The BC government also installed a commemorative plaque at the site of the hanging of the chiefs.

In 2014, the BC government exonerated the Tsilhqot'in leaders. Premier Christy Clark stated, "We confirm without reservation that these six Tsilhqot'in chiefs are fully exonerated for any crime or wrongdoing." This exoneration was reciprocally made by Prime Minister Trudeau, on behalf of the Government of Canada, on March 26, 2018, in a speech to Parliament. During the speech, the then-current Chiefs of the Tsilhqot'in Nation were invited onto the floor of the House of Commons and provided a drum song. This was the first time in Canadian history that an Indigenous nation was invited onto the floor of the House of Commons. Clark also acknowledged that "there is an indication [that smallpox] was spread intentionally."

On November 2, 2018, Trudeau fulfilled a promise made in his apology speech in March and became the first prime minister to visit the land of the Tsilhqot'in people, where he made another apology speech, this time to the Tsilhqot'in community and its leaders. Trudeau rode into the valley on a black horse, symbolizing the ones ridden by the wrongfully executed chiefs and participated in a smudging ceremony during his time there.

== In media ==
Donna Milner uses the Chilcotin War in a historical fiction book: A Place Called Sorry.

== See also ==
- List of massacres in Canada

== Bibliography ==
Notes

References

- Admin (2016). "Revisiting the Chilcotin War". turning-point.ca. Archived from the original on March 24, 2011.
- Committee on the Elimination of Racial Discrimination (2001-03-16). "Fourteenth periodic reports of States parties due in 1997. Canada". Reports Subumitted by States Parties Under Article 9 of the Convention. United Nations. Archived from the original on November 23, 2005.
- Cordasco, Lisa (Oct 24, 2014). "Tsilhqot'in chiefs hanged in 1864 exonerated by B.C. Premier Christy Clark". CBC News.
- Hewlett, Edward Sleigh (1976). "Klatsassin, Klatsassan, Klattasine". In Halpenny, Francess G. (ed.). Dictionary of Canadian Biography. Vol. IX (1861–1870) (online ed.). University of Toronto Press.
- Milner, Donna (2015). A Place Called Sorry (2015 ed.). Caitlin Press. ISBN 9781927575949. - Total pages: 264
- Mole, Rich (2009). The Chilcotin War. Surrey, BC: Heritage House.
- Ormsby, Margaret Anchoretta (1958). British Columbia: A History. Vancouver: MacMillan Company of Canada. - Total pages: 558
- Rothenburger, Mel. The Chilcotin War. 1978.
- Swanky, Tom (Oct 16, 2013). "Puntzi Lake and the Martyrdom of "The Chilcotin Chiefs"". shawnswanky.com.
- White, Howard (1994). "Scotty McIntyre". Raincoast Chronicles Eleven Up. Madeira Park, BC: Harbour Publishing. ISBN 9781550171051. - Total pages: 408
