= Fort Chilcotin =

Former settlement in British Columbia

Coordinates: 52°6′N 123°27′W

Fort Chilcotin (also known as just Chilcotin and Chilk Otin) was a short-lived Hudson's Bay Company (HBC) trading post, located at the confluence of the Chilko and Chilcotin Rivers, British Columbia, Canada.

Its origins date back to 1822 when George McDougall, a HBC employee from Fort Alexandria, traveled up the Chilcotin River and found the area rich in fur. Although a trading post was intended to be opened the following year, this was prevented until 1829 by a mild winter and hostilities among indigenous groups. But it was already abandoned in February 1830.

It operated again between 1836 and 1844. A commercial failure due to the lack of interest in the company merchandise shown by the Tsilhqot'in people, its operations were moved north to Fort Kluskus (or Tluzcuz) in Dakelh Territory, where the HBC could take advantage of the beaver trade from inland indigenous traveling to the Pacific coast.

Today, the site where the fort once stood is colloquially known as "Hudson's Bay Flats" - remembered particularly by the Tsilhqot'in (via oral history) as the site where, during the Chilcotin War, Lhats'as?in and the other Tsilhqot'in war chiefs were wrongfully arrested under a flag of truce for murder.

== See also ==
- Canadian Forces Camp Chilcotin (sometimes referred to as Fort Chilcotin, and in the same general vicinity)
- List of Hudson's Bay Company trading posts
