= Allan McLean (outlaw) =

Canadian outlaw (1855 – 1881)

- Born: c. 1855; Thompson's River Post, New Caledonia (Canada)
- Died: January 31, 1881 (aged 25–26); New Westminster, B.C.
- Cause of death: Hanging
- Parent(s): Donald McLean & Sophia Grant
- Criminal charges: Murder

Allan McLean (c. 1855 – January 31, 1881) was a Canadian outlaw, born in Thompson's River Post, New Caledonia (now Kamloops, British Columbia).

== Media ==
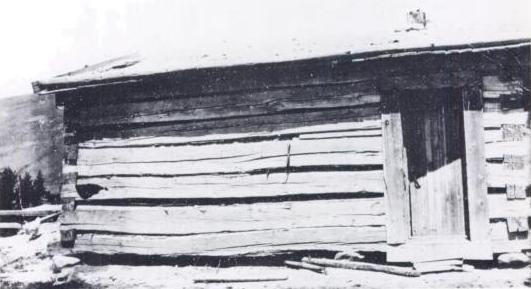
The cabin near Ashcroft, B.C., where the McLeans were captured
