= Canadian Forces Camp Chilcotin =

Canadian Forces training camp in British Columbia

Coordinates: 52°05′00″N 122°33′00″W

Canadian Forces Camp Chilcotin is a Canadian Forces training camp in the Chilcotin District, to the west of the city of Williams Lake on the eastern Chilcotin Plateau. The 40977 hectares (101,256 acres) of land is currently owned by the Federal Government. Within its boundaries, the so-called "Military Block" contains Drummond (Island) Lake, Fish Lake, Callanan Lake, as well as innumerable other small lakes. It also contains a Volcanic Plug called The Dome or Danilʔaz in Tsilhqotʼin, and parts of Beecher Prairie.

== History ==
Known today as the Chilcotin Military Training Area, the land once was used extensively by both the Tlesqox-t'in of the Tsilhqot'in Nation (Anglicized as Chilcotin), and possibly also the Setlemuk, AKA Canyon Shuswap. Many historic village sites of Quiggly hole as well as countless other archaeological sites have been located within the area. After the 1862 Pacific Northwest smallpox epidemic, almost all the Canyon Shuswap people died, and survivors joined with today's Alkali Lake band (Esketemc). After the threat of a third intentional introduction of smallpox to the region, Tŝilhqot'in Chief Lhatŝ'aŝʔin began the Chilcotin War in 1864 to make it known to all settlers and other First Nations that the homelands of the Tŝilhqot'in were off-limits, and all outsiders were removed. This included the area known today as the Chilcotin Military Training Area. While the Tŝilhqot'in recovered from population decimation, the lands were used less than previous countless generations of indigenous people. This changed in the mid 20th Century when First Nations leaders established at Fish Lake (AKA "Chilcotin Forest") an interdisciplinary cultural centre and field school, where youth and others were taught traditional hunting and gathering practices, net making, hide tanning, etc. A revival of Tŝilhqot'in language also took place at Fish Lake. However, the lands were acquired by the Canadian Federal Government with questionable consent from those using the land, and today all that remains of the cultural centre are decrepit building foundations and overgrown driveways. Hunters are encouraged to exercise extreme caution when in the area. In 2017, the Military Block was heavily affected by wildfire - as was the majority of the Chilcotin Plateau. The Chilcotin Plateau was the ideal location for the Designated Special Wireless Station #4, its role with the Royal Canadian Corp Of Signals was that of Signals Electronic Intelligence using High Frequency radio receivers directed towards Pacific Ocean, Japan, Korea and Russia. Riske Creek is located approximately midway between Kamloops and Prince George BC. The village is the site of one of the earliest ranches in the area owned by a Polish gentleman, L.W. Riskie.

1. 4 Special Wireless Station was established here in the spring of 1944, and closed in July of the same year without ever becoming operational. It was a huge log building with 14 sleeping rooms on the 2nd floor and six or seven on the main floor. The Lodge had been chosen to house the crew who would build and operate the new station.

The personnel who were designated to staff # 4 Wireless were required to augment the formation of #1 Canadian Special Wireless Group (1CSWG) in Victoria, which deployed to Australia in January 1945, and returned to Canada on February 26, 1946.

riske_creek.jpg

1. 4 Special Wireless Station at Riske Creek, BC Currently operated as The Historic Chilcotin Lodge. (Image provided by Bill Robinson)
