= Nicola people =

First Nations alliance in Nicola Country, British Columbia, Canada

The Nicola people are a First Nations political and cultural alliance in the Nicola Country region of the Southern Interior of the Canadian province of British Columbia. They are mostly located in the Nicola River valley around the area of Merritt and are an alliance of Scw'exmx, the local branch of the Nlaka'pamux (Thompson) people, and the Spaxomin, the local branch of the Syilx or Okanagan people. The combined population of the communities composing the Nicola people is approximately 3,492, with around 1,250 of these members living on-reservation.

The name Nicola is not a derivation of Nlaka'pamux or its variants, but is taken from the usual English name of the chief who forged the alliance, Nicola (Hwistesmexte'qen, "Walking Grizzy Bear"), which then included the Secwepemc communities surrounding Fort Kamloops. He had been dubbed "Nicholas" by the Métis voyageurs of the fur companies (pron. French way as Nico-LA, but in general BC usage as NICK-ola, also known in English as Nicholas or Old Nicholas). A "nativized" adaptation of Nicola in common use today is N'kwala.

== Government ==
The Nicola have a separate tribal council from the rest of the Nlaka'pamux, the Nicola Tribal Association, which also includes the Siska Band of the Fraser Canyon. The Douglas Lake Band, which is the home of the Spaxomin group, are also members of the Okanagan Nation Alliance as well as the Nicola Tribal Association.

== The Nicola Athapaskans ==
"Nicola" is used by linguists and ethnographers to refer to an Athapaskan people and their language who formerly lived in the area, but were extinct by the later 19th century.

== See also ==
- Mount Nkwala
- Chief Lolo
