= Nicola (Okanagan leader) =

Grand chief of the Okanagan people

Nicola (c. 1780–1785 – c. 1859) (Spokan: Hwistesmetxe'qen, Walking Grizzly Bear), also Nkwala or N'kwala, was an important First Nations political figure in the fur trade era of the British Columbia Interior (early 19th century to 1858) as well as into the early colonial period (1858–1871). He was grand chief of the Okanagan people and chief of the Nicola Valley peoples, an alliance of Nlaka'pamux and Okanagans and the surviving Nicola Athapaskans, and also of the Kamloops Band of the Shuswap people.

== Name ==
The name Nicolas (/ˈnɪkələ/ NIK-ə-lə in approximation of the French) was conferred on him by French-Canadians in the employ of the Hudson's Bay and Northwest Companies who worked at a temporary unnamed trading post at the head of Okanagan Lake. The Scots and English in the employ of the companies adapted this to Nicholas and Old Nicholas, while First Nations people adapted it to Nkwala’.

== Biography ==
=== Lineage ===
Nicola was one of the four children and chiefly heir of Pelka'mulox ("Rolls-Over-The-Earth"), third chief in the lineage of Okanagan chiefs to bear that name (which was by linguistic origin Spokane), the first and second being born c.1675-1680 and c.1705-1710 respectively. The date of birth of the third Pelka'mulox, Nicola's father, is uncertain but his death was sometime in the first decade of the 19th century, caused by an arrow fired by a chief of the Lillooet (St'at'imc) at the historic fishing grounds around Fountain and Pavilion. The argument between the two chiefs had begun when chief of the Lakes Lillooet provoked a violent argument by denouncing Pelka'mulox, who had hunted buffalo on the plains and met North West Company traders Lagace and MacDonald in what is now Montana, for describing the existence of white people and their new civilization, and calling his story a lie.

Upon his death, the chieftaincy of the Okanagan people passed to Hwistesmetxe'qen (Nicola), while his uncle, Pelka'mulox's brother Kwali'la, who had helped him survive the wars of his youth with the Thompson, Shuswap and Kutenai, assumed the joint Thompson-Shuswap chieftaincy at Kamloops. Kwali'la also had helped Pelka'mulox establish the Okanagan people in the area round Nicola Lake, which had been Shuswap territory until that time (the people at Kamloops were a mix of Shuswap and Okanagan at the time). With his dying breath Pelka'mulox entrusted Kwali'la with the guardianship of his son, and ordered that he be raised to avenge his father's death.

Pelka'mulox's status as chief of the Okanagan people in the Nicola Valley and the upper Okanagan Lake area, was passed to Nicola, who came to reside in the valley around the lake that now bears his name or at Kamloops, as Kwali'la's title as chief of the Kamloops eventually passed to Nicola upon the former's death. In addition to being presiding chief of that group of Okanagan, he was also grand chief of all the Okanagan nation, although since the drawing of the border a separate, independent American chieftain emerged, founded by Tonasket.

Because of his 15-17 wives, drawn from Okanagan, Sanpoil, Colville, Spokane, Shuswap, Stu'wix, Thompson and maybe others, and the about 50 surviving children he had by them (from those who died in infancy or childhood), many people throughout the Interior of both British Columbia and the adjoining regions of the United States are descended from Nicola. His hereditary chieftaincy passed, however, to an adopted son, his nephew Chilliheetza (Tselaxi'tsa, spelled by Teit as Chelahitsa) who was his sister's son, and continues today amid local bands.

=== Trust and Duty ===
Nicola became trusted by the fur traders, who left him to be in charge of the trading post for the winter. He kept the place well and collected many furs, and upon their return in gratitude the traders gave him 10 guns and a supply of ammunition. Around this time Kwali'la (Duncan to the traders) the chief of the Kamloops Shuswap (Secwepemc), who was also his uncle and foster-father, reminded him of the need to avenge his father's death, and he formed an alliance of neighbouring peoples to attack the Lillooet (St'at'imc). In no small part his power to form this alliance resided in the web of in-laws and offspring throughout the native peoples of the Interior.

=== Nicola's War ===
Nicola's alliance against the Lillooet comprised Okanagan, Shuswap, Stu'wix and Upper Thompson (Ashcroft-Spences Bridge). They swept through the mountainous Lillooet Country all the way to the valley of the Lillooet River, the country of the Lower Lillooet or Lil'wat, killing 300-400 and taking many women and children captive and occupying the region for some time, driving the survivors into exile in the woods away from the salmon-rich streams of the region for a generation.

The Lower Lillooet are said to have first heard a gun and seen a horse because of this war, although the Upper Lillooet (around today's town of Lillooet) were familiar with horses and may have owned them at this time, and as seen by Simon Fraser and his men, they had guns of possibly Russian make in 1808. Fraser's journals describe also the town of Lillooet being heavily fortified and the men armoured, and their hosts full of anxiety about hostile neighbours and a state of war, but this would have been before the gift of ten guns (the temporary post on Okanagan Lake was started after Fraser's journey), so there may be no direct connection to Nicola's War. The date of the council which led to the death of Pelka'mulox is unknown - but certainly before Fraser came through the Lillooet area (as the context of the story is that Pelka'mulox was the first of all assembled to have seen white men, and this included upriver Shuswap as well as the Nlaka'pamux just down river, both of whom would have met Fraser and, in the case of the northerners, also known to Alexander Mackenzie).

=== The Great Elk Hunts ===
Nicola organized great hunts in the Nicola Valley of the once-vast elk herds that once roamed there, using techniques adapted from the buffalo hunt by driving them over cliffs, or simply driving them into enclosures. The efficiency of these hunting techniques is believed to have led to the extermination of elk in that region.

=== Travels ===
Like his father, Nicola travelled widely and was well-known and also visited the Prairie for buffalo hunts. He is credited with being on the winning side in a battle with the Blackfoot while there. It was also he who came to Nicola Lake to bury the Thompson and Stu'wix victims of a Shuswap raid on their settlement at Guichon.

=== The Fur Trade and Fort Kamloops ===
Nicola attempted to take over Fort Kamloops from Chief Trader John Tod, but was outwitted, but otherwise lived in harmony with and was highly respected by the fur traders. Among his own people and neighbouring peoples his word was law, and as with the fur traders he was known for "sagacity, honesty, prudence and fair dealing, and was rather a peacemaker than a fighting man".

=== The Gold Rush, the Okanagan Trail and the Fraser Canyon War ===
Before the discovery of the major placer gold find at the Nicoamen River, which enters the Thompson just a few miles upstream from Lytton, the Kamloops people under Nicola's dominion were already trading for goods at Fort Kamloops using gold from nearby creeks. It was news of these finds which began further exploration and resulted in the find at Nicoamen, and the even bigger find at Hill's Bar, south of Yale at the lower end of the Canyon. Within months the lower Fraser was swarmed by up to 30,000 goldseekers of all nationalities, most by way of California where news of the gold had hit a time of depression as well as political turmoil. Many of the 30,000 gave up by the onset of winter but over 10,000 remained to work the bars of the Fraser between present-day Lillooet and Hope. Of those in the upper canyon around Lillooet and the fishing grounds at Fountain, especially early in the rush before the Lakes Route through St'at'imc territory to the west was opened up, many or perhaps most came overland via the Okanagan and Kamloops, or else by a more southerly cutoff via the Similkameen River through what was by then known as Nicola's Country, and came in time to be known as the Nicola Country. The Similkameen Trail is sometimes marked on maps as the "trail to the Couteau Country", meaning the country of the Thompsons, who were also called the Couteau Indians - "Knife" Indians.

The number who came overland through the Okanagan Valley and other land routes is unknown, but in the case of the Okanagan Trail numbered a few thousands, generally travelling in war parties of hundreds of men. Some of the early parties ransacked native food caches and villages and engaged in battles and potshots at natives en route, with some driven back. Nicola confronted one party) when they arrived at Kamloops and admonished them, saying they didn't know how close to outright war they were, and demanded the punishment of the guilty men, and invoking his own observance of British law, because without it he had the power to see them all killed. The guilty men, who had been chastised by the main group and its leaders during the journey for their rogue behaviours, were handed over to face justice. Nicola then hosted the party as guests and rode with them to the goldfields by the ancient trail from the mid-Thompson across the Hat Creek-Pavilion plateau into the great fishing grounds at Fountain, which were also at the upper end of gold-mining activity on the Fraser and a hub of activity. This location was also where his father Pelka'lumox had been killed.

In 1858, Nicola used his power and influence to protect those miners coming to the Thompson and Fraser goldfields via the Okanagan Trail, despite their own bad conduct. This essentially prevented a spreading of the Yakima War across the international frontier and, though exhorted to quash the miners' parties, who had attacked natives and raided and spoiled food caches on their way through Okanagan and Yakima country, he refused to engage them at war and instead, in the case of one party, escorted them from Kamloops to the Fraser at Fountain. Also exhorted to join in the Spokane War as well as the Fraser Canyon War, he demurred on both occasions but apparently was ready in 1858 to join forces with the Thompson against the whites if events in the Canyon War had not turned out relatively peaceably. He felt sorry for the Spokanes that their country had fallen to the Americans but he held fast to his alliance with the Queen and, originally, with King George, which he had struck before the boundary was created. He died around 1859.

=== Legacy ===
Nicola was the most important and influential chief in the Interior of British Columbia in the time period spanning the opening of the inland fur trade to the time of the Cariboo Gold Rush. It is safe to say, because of his stance in the Yakima, Spokane and Fraser Canyon Wars and in mediating an end to the violence of the Okanagan Trail, that without him the history of British Columbia might have been considerably more war-torn and BC's native peoples might have become entangled with American troops (thereby increasing the existing American threat to British control of the Interior). His son Chilliheetza continued his father's policy of loyalty to his father's alliance with the Crown, and as his father had done before him, prevented all-out war against the whites - fomented by the Thompsons and Okanagans - at the time of the Sproat Commission and also in resisting the call by the "Wild McLean Boys" (the sons of celebrated Fort Kamloops trader Donald McLean, whose wife was one of the Kamloops Shuswap and a near relation) during their attempt to transform their own murder of rancher Johnny Ussher into a full-scale Indian uprising.

Because of the boundary treaty partitioning Okanagan territory, Okanagans south of the line became organized under a new chieftaincy founded by Tonasket, who was not of chiefly lineage but rose to prominence because of his campaigns against the miners travelling the Okanagan Trail. Most American Okanogan people reside at Omak, Washington, or on the Colville Indian Reservation, where they are intermingled with other Salishan peoples of the region.

== Other uses ==
The region of his reign became known as Nicola's Country, with the river that ran through it named for him, and the largest lake and the valley it flows through named for the river, still called in regional English today "the Nicola Country". The ongoing alliance of Thompson and Okanagan peoples in the Nicola Valley today are colloquially also called "the Nicolas". Their Nlaka'pamux component call themselves the Scw'exmx, while the Okanagan component are the Spa7omin (older spelling use Spahomin where the 'h' represents the glottal stop for what is now commonly rendered as the '7').

The name Nicola people is also used in ethnology and linguistics to refer to a now-extinct Athapaskan group who once lived amid the Scw'exmx and Spaxomin, and also in the Upper Similkameen before being driven out by the Similkameen Okanagan; they are also called the Stuwix or Stuwix'emux - "the strangers", "strange people", because they were recent arrivals in the territory and spoke an unrelated language). They are also called the Nicola Athapaskans.

Although they got along with their immediate neighbours, who had given them refuge a couple of centuries or so before after fleeing hostile neighbours in the north, they were wiped out by the late 19th Century by raids by Thompson and Shuswap, intermarriage with the Scw'exmx and Spaxomin, and also by attrition. Only a handful of placenames from their language remain in the area, and are all that is known of their language, other than it was Athapaskan, although outside of official ethnology an account by Okanagan Mourning Dove says that they were Chinookan.

== See also ==
- Nicola Tribal Association (Nicola Tribal Council)
