= Frederick Seymour =

Canadian politician

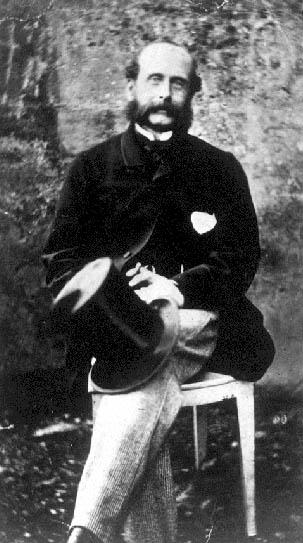
- Seymour, as Governor of British Columbia

Governor of Crown Colony of British Columbia
- In office 1864–1866
- Preceded by: James Douglas
- Succeeded by: position abolished

Governor of the United Colonies of Vancouver Island and British Columbia
- In office 1866–1869
- Succeeded by: Anthony Musgrave

Personal details
- Born: 6 September 1820 Belfast, Ireland
- Died: 10 June 1869 (aged 48) British Columbia
- Spouse(s): Florence Maria Stapleton (1832–1902), who was the daughter of The Hon. Reverend Sir Francis Stapleton. Married 27 January 1866.
- Occupation: British colonial governor

Frederick Seymour (6 September 1820 – 10 June 1869) was a British colonial governor who was an illegitimate grandson of Francis Seymour-Conway, 2nd Marquess of Hertford. He was appointed to the Colonial Office by Prince Albert.

He served as Lieutenant-Governor of Honduras, and as Governor of the Colony of British Columbia, including after its union with the colony of Vancouver Island.

== Family ==
Frederick Seymour was born on 6 September 1820 to Henry Augustus Seymour and Margaret Williams, in Belfast, Northern Ireland. He was the fourth son of Henry Augustus and Margaret.

His father Henry Augustus Seymour, who was the illegitimate son of Francis Seymour-Conway, 2nd Marquess of Hertford, received his education at Harrow School, Pembroke College, Cambridge, and the Inns of Court. Henry was given family property in Ireland, a secure private income, and an office in the customs-service. However, his privilege ended with the succession of the 3rd Marquis of Hertford in 1822, after which he took his family to reside in Brussels, Belgium.

Frederick's eldest brother, Francis (later General Sir Francis Seymour, 1st Baronet), had a successful military career and, as a consequence of his friendship with Prince Albert, resided at Kensington Place until his death.

== Entry into Colonial Office ==
Frederick Seymour was two years old when his father lost his fortune, and he did not receive a privileged education nor an inheritance, unlike his older siblings. In 1842, as a consequence of Prince Albert's intervention, he obtained a junior appointment in the Colonial Service. He was given the title of Assistant Colonial Secretary of Van Diemen's Land (present day Tasmania). The colonies Seymour worked in were "all in a traditional stage of development and which were all torn by political strife and encumbered with serious economic problems." Seymour worked as the Assistant Colonial Secretary of Van Diemen's Land until his position was dissolved.

In 1848, he was appointed Special Magistrate at Antigua in the Leeward Islands, as which he disputed with sugar-planters over trade policies. He became President of Nevis in 1853, where he supported free trade despite opposition from the local leading families. As a reward for his good service, he was promoted to Superintendent of British Honduras (present day Belize) in 1857, and later to Lieutenant-Governor of the Bay Islands, and later to Lieutenant-Governor of Honduras.

== Governor of British Columbia (1864 - 1866) ==
In 1863, Seymour spent some time in England, and on his return to Belize he received a letter from the Duke of Newcastle, then Colonial Secretary, that offered him promotion to the governorship of British Columbia, where he was promised a personal residence and a yearly salary of £3,000, both at the expense of the colony.

Newcastle had recommended Seymour to Queen Victoria as "a man of much ability and energy who has shown considerable aptitude for the management of savage tribes." Seymour accepted the offer, partly as a consequence of the more moderate climate of British Columbia: "It is highly gratifying to me, to accept this important trust from the Secretary of State to whom I owe my introduction to the Colonial Service. The prospect of a change from the swamps of Honduras to a fine country is inexpressibly attractive to me, and I trust, in the bracing of air of North America to prove myself worthy of your Grace's confidence and kindness."

Seymour was accompanied to North America, by Arthur Nonus Birch, who was a junior clerk in the Colonial Office, who was to be Seymour's secretary. Capitan Arthur Edward Kennedy was appointed Governor of Vancouver Island on 11 December 1863, and Seymour was appointed Governor of mainland British Columbia on January 11 1864. The Colonial Office hoped that the profits of the gold-rush would enable British Columbia to become a self-sustaining colony under Seymour.

When he arrived, Seymour was introduced to the recently departed Royal Engineers, Columbia Detachment's plan to clear the hillside of the north bank of the Fraser River to prepare for a gold-rush in the spring of the following year. The Fraser River had yielded gold in 1857-58, when a consequent wave of miners from California and other parts of the west caused disorder. In 1858, the Royal Navy was sent to British Columbia to defend British authority. Indigenous groups, including the Chilcotin, objected to the colonisers.

Seymour expressed his objective to develop mining infrastructure in his reports to Lord Cardwell. He developed the suspicion of Douglas's mercantile provenance that had characterised the founder of British Columbia, Richard Clement Moody, and Moody's wife Mary Susannah Hawks, and Moody's secretary freemason Robert Burnaby. Burnaby had observed that Douglas proceeded with "muddling [Moody's] work and doubling his expenditure" and with employing administrators to "work a crooked policy against Moody" to "retard British Columbia and build up... the stronghold of Hudson's Bay interests" and their own "landed stake". Like Moody and Burnaby, Seymour believed that Douglas sought to enable the factors of Vancouver Island control the Cariboo gold trade at the expense of the finances of the mainland colony that were perennially insufficient. Seymour said that the mainland colony "was only a colony in name. There was a goldmine at one end of a line of road and a seaport town under a different government at the opposite terminus." Seymour's predecessor Moody had feuded with Douglas as a consequence of Douglas's ignorance of, and indifference to, the finances of the mainland colony, and of Moody's lesser authority than Douglas despite the higher prestige of Moody's office.

Douglas's premiership had left Seymour with an outstanding loan of £100,000, which was combined with the Cariboo Road debt and the debt that was needed to fund soldiers to repress indigenous insurrections. Seymour nevertheless invested in the construction of roads to the gold-mining district of Cariboo, including a 120-mile road from Cariboo to the Bute Inlet, the surveying for which was completed by 1865, that provoked indigenous assaults on workers. The most notable assault on the settlers by indigenous people was the Chilcotin Uprising, by Tsilhqot'in warriors, that killed 14 workers and a local ferryman. Seymour consequently dispatched a force of 28 men from New Westminster under Chartres Brew, who was Chief Inspector of Police. Seymour later joined Brew on his expedition. Their group drove the Tsilhqot'in warriors deep into Chilcotin territory until Seymour met with the Chilcotin leader Alexis at Puntzi Lake, where he was informed that the Chilcotin chiefs had lost control of the groups that had assaulted the workers. The assailants were found and handed to William Cox, the Gold Commissioner of Cariboo.

When visiting the Cariboo mines, Seymour was overwhelmed by the support that he received from the miners. When he finally returned to New Westminster, the Collins Overland Telegraph Company wanted to install a telegraph line that would connect America and Russia, through British Columbia Territory, and he was informed that gold had been discovered on the Kootenay River east of New Westminster, as a consequence of which he enacted a higher gold export tax in 1865.

=== The Union with Vancouver Island ===
The Vancouver Island Assembly had become too great a cost for the British government, which looked to unite it with that of the mainland colony. The reduction of the mainland colony's funding by the failure of the private banking venture at the Cariboo mines in 1864 and the reduced number of miners in 1865 increased support in the mainland for the union. Even with inadequate funds, Seymour continued to invest in road expansion to connect more industrial communities on the mainland to improve the mainland's economy.

Governor Kennedy's Assembly advocated the union of the two colonies. When Seymour was summoned to England in September 1865 to inform the Colonial Office about the conditions of the Pacific coastline, Seymour mentioned "the extreme inconvenience to myself of the position of two Governors of equal authority close to each other yet far from home." He nevertheless repudiated the prospective union, which was advocated by Hudson's Bay Company factors of Vancouver Island, the Bank of British Columbia, and geopolitically uninformed members of the British armed forces. Seymour therefore submitted to work on policies for the union.

Seymour insisted that the constitution of the united colonies be "that of British Columbia", that the mainland's tariff acts remain in force, and the capital of the united colony be located at New Westminster. The Act of Union was hurried through parliament in November 1866, and Seymour announced the creation of the new united colony in both New Westminster and Victoria.

=== Involvement in Indigenous Political Relations (1864–1869) ===
Before the commencement of his premiership, Seymour had expressed his desire to have rapport with the indigenous population of the territory. He stated that "my heart is as good to the Indian as to the white man". Indigenous Sto-lo and Salish groups were worried that the new governor would not maintain the accords that they had had with his predecessor Sir James Douglas, to whom the Sto:lo expressed their worries.

Those accords included land-protection acts that granted to the Sto:lo the "choicest prairie lands" and "nearly a mile frontage for each Indian", for which Douglas had been censured for gratuitous preference for the indigenous population, by the Legislative Council who claimed that the grants of his land-protection acts were "unnecessarily large" and impeded "the development of the agricultural resources of the colony.

On 24 May 1864, Seymour invited surrounding Indigenous nations to celebrate Queen Victoria's birthday, to celebrate which over 3500 indigenous people travelled over 200km down the Fraser River to New Westminster. The Salish and Sto:lo chiefs honoured Seymour in their speeches, and offered to him the 1864 petition, which was signed by 55 Salish leaders, that included the following passage:

We know the good heart of the Queen for the Indians. You bring that good heart with you, so we are happy to welcome you. We wish to become good Indians, and to be friends with the white people…. Please to protect our land, that it will not be small for us: many are well pleased with their reservations, and many wish that their reservations be marked out for them.

Seymour believed that his acceptance of this petition "established with them some of the same rapport that Douglas, their "Great Chief", had previously enjoyed": but many indigenous oral histories describe Seymour as "someone who broke promises" and "a bad person" because he maintained the British policy that indigenous people "could neither own nor occupy land that the crown had made available to settlers".

Another petition, of 1868, which was signed by 70 Salish and Sto:lo leaders, was written by children who had been educated by Christian missionaries. It entreated the governor to "prevent white men from selling liquour to their people, asked that all indigenous peoples be exempt from tolls for transporting goods on the Fraser River, and to protect Indigenous lands and fishing rights". It stated:

For many years we have been complaining of the land left to us being too small. We have laid our complaints before the Government officials nearest to us: they sent us to some others; so we had no redress up to the present; and we have felt like men being trampled on, and are commencing to believe that the aim of the white men is to exterminate us as soon as they can, although we have always been quiet, obedient, kind, and friendly to the whites.

Seymour supported the Christian missionaries, who had educated the children who wrote the 1868 petition, in their attempt to "integrate" the indigenous people "into society". The Christian missionaries worked in exchange for "cultivation of land as farmers, sending the children to school and listening to what the clergymen tell you and believe in it", which was accepted by many Sto:lo and Salish people. The missionary Father Fouquet contributed to the 1866 petition.

When, in May 1869, there were reports about violence between indigenous tribes in the north of British Columbia, Seymour departed boat with mercenaries to repressed the violence, and paid each indigenous tribe to sign a peace treaty. Seymour was commended as "creditable to his administrative ability…and entirely in consonance with the kindliness of heart". However, Seymour wrote in his journal that "Europeans should thus run down wild Indians and drive them to suicide of surrender".

=== Final Economic Struggles in British Columbia ===
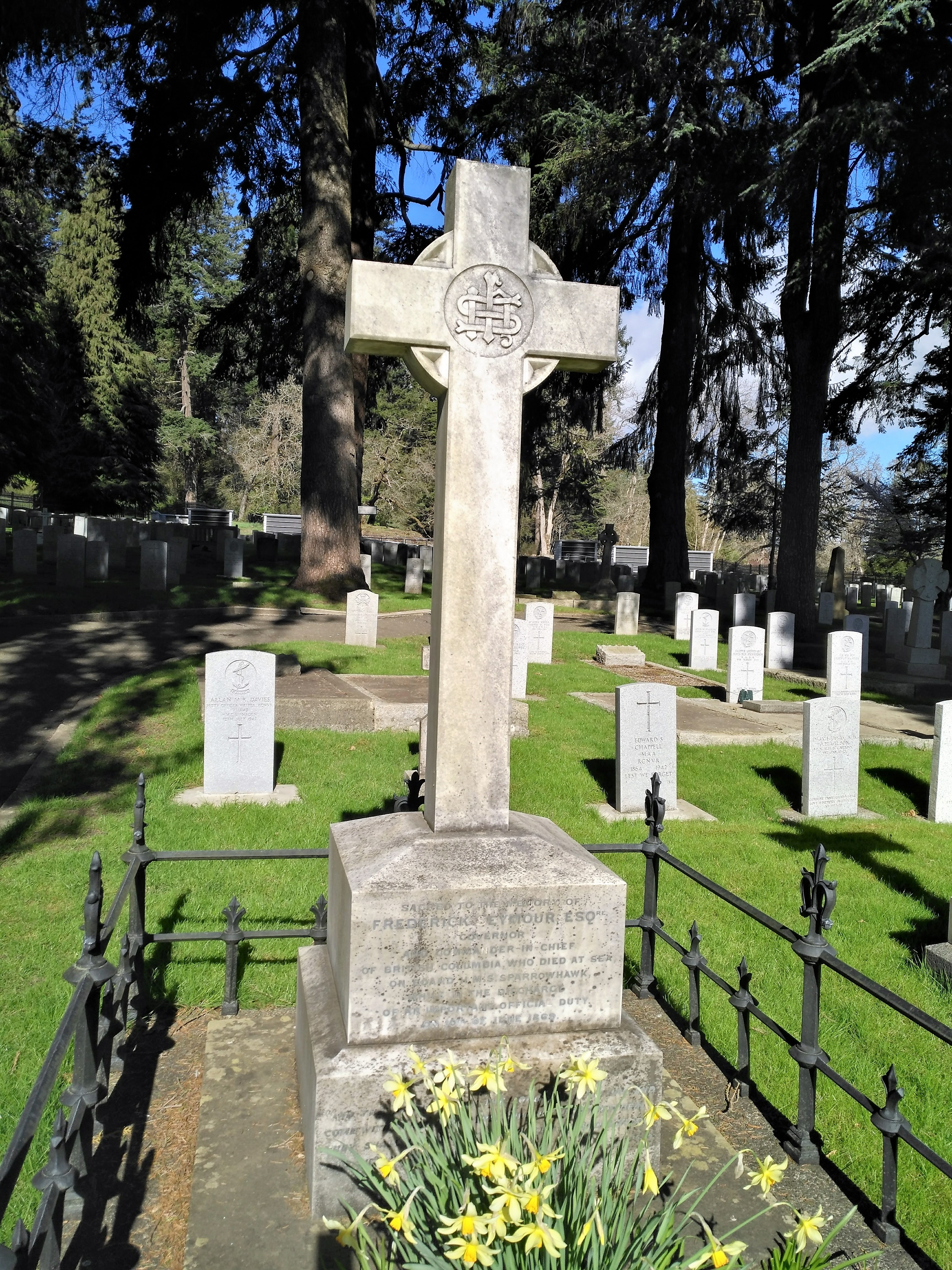
Grave of Frederick Seymour at the Veterans' Cemetery in Esquimalt, British Columbia

British Columbia had a faltering economy throughout Seymour's premiership. Its interior gold-fields had been exhausted, and their miners had emigrated. Seymour had attempted to delay the joining of Vancouver Island and British Columbia because its administration funds had been reduced to $88,000. Export-tax on the mined gold was insufficient, and $100,000 in tobacco and alcohol was imported before the mainland's tariffs were extended to Vancouver Island.

In 1867, with a population of 15,000 between the mainland and Vancouver Island, the United Colony had a debt of $1,300,000. When he travelled to Grouse Lake in Caribou and William Duncan's Indian Community at Metlakatla, the little contact that the Colonial Office received from him was a request for a loan of $50,000, subsequent to which Arthur Birch, who was acting duty of Governor while Seymour travelled for 14 months, was asked by The Duke of Buckingham to write for the Cabinet an account of the success of Seymour's premiership, which had seen property values and trade decrease.

== Death ==
On 10 June 1869, Seymour died from typhoid asthenia on board HMS Sparrowhawk near the north coast of British Columbia, and his body was transported to Victoria, the unified British Columbia's new capital. News of his death reached Government House by the early hours of the morning on 14 June, and before noon the Colonial Secretary, Lieutenant Philip James Hankin R. N., had become a temporary administrator of the United Colonies. The Executive Council swore in Hankin with the customary oath of allegiance and oath of office, after which a telegram was sent to the Secretary of State in London to inform them of Seymour's death.

The telegram was received on June 15, and at four o'clock that afternoon the Colonial Office replied to Hankin that Anthony Musgrave was to be appointed and announced as the new Governor of British Columbia. Musgrave was appointed, whilst on the way from Newfoundland. He requested to visit England first to receive a detailed brief for his new office, but the Colonial Office refused and ordered him to British Columbia at once. Musgrave, unlike Seymour, was a pro-confederation governor, and also advocated the confederation of Newfoundland.

Seymour's widow subsequently lived in London, where she died in November 1902.

== Places named for Seymour ==
- Mount Seymour is a peak, a provincial park, and ski hill located in the Coast Mountains northeast of Vancouver, British Columbia. There are two other, much lower, Mount Seymours; one on Quadra Island, offshore from the town of Campbell River, the other on Moresby Island in the Queen Charlotte Islands.
- There are two watercourses named the Seymour River. One flows from Mt. Seymour to Burrard Inlet, and the other into Shuswap Lake.
- Seymour Arm is an arm of Shuswap Lake, British Columbia.
- Seymour Inlet is located in a maze of inlets on the north flank of Queen Charlotte Strait.
- Frederick Sound is located on the northern British Columbia Coast opposite Haida Gwaii.
- There are two bands of mountains named the Seymour Range in British Columbia. One is located on Southern Vancouver Island, and the other north of Shuswap Lake in the upper reaches of the Seymour River, at the head of which there is a Seymour Pass.
- Seymour Street is a major north-south artery in downtown Vancouver, bounded to the south by the Granville Street Bridge, and to the north by Cordova Street.
- Seymour Landing on Seymour Bay, on the southeast coast of Bowen Island, just west of West Vancouver.
- Seymour Island, an islet in Sunderland Channel on the north coast of Hardwicke Island, in the Johnstone Strait area between Vancouver Island and the mainland to the north of it.

Government offices
Preceded by Willoughby J. Shortland	President of Nevis; 1854–1857	Succeeded by Sir Arthur Rumbold
Preceded by William Stevenson	Superintendent of British Honduras; 1857–1862	position abolished
New title	Lieutenant Governor of British Honduras; 1862–1864	Succeeded by John Gardiner Austin
Preceded by Sir James Douglas	Governor of Crown Colony of British Columbia; 1864–1866	position abolished
New title	Governor of the Colony of British Columbia; 1866–1869	Succeeded by Sir Anthony Musgrave
