= 105 Mile Post Indian Reserve No. 2 =

Coordinates: 50°44′00″N 121°19′00″W

105 Mile Post 2 (2006 population 5) is an Indian reserve in the Thompson Country of the Interior of British Columbia, Canada, just west of the town of Ashcroft. The reserve is administered by the Ashcroft Indian Band of the Nlaka'pamux people.

This Indian Reserve should not be confused with 105 Mile House, which is a locality near 100 Mile House farther north.

== Demographics ==
Canada census – 105 Mile Post 2 community profile

	2021
Population	5 (-50.0% from 2016)
Land area	13.65 km^{2} (5.27 sq mi)
Population density	0.4/km^{2} (1.0/sq mi)
Median age	0 (M: , F: )
Private dwellings	5 (total) 4 (occupied)
Median household income

References: 2021
- N/A = Data Not Available
- * = Population is rounded to allow confidentiality.
