= 105 Mile House =

- Location of 105 Mile House in British Columbia
- Coordinates: 51°42′00″N 121°19′00″W
- Country: Canada
- Province: British Columbia
- Area codes: 250, 778

105 Mile House is an unincorporated settlement in the South Cariboo region of the Central Interior of British Columbia, Canada. Located on 105 Mile Lake, it is between Lac La Hache and the town of 100 Mile House. Like other milehouse-names in this region its name is derived from its distance from Lillooet via the Old Cariboo Road.

105 Mile House should not be confused with 105 Mile Post Indian Reserve No. 2, just south, near Ashcroft, British Columbia.
