= Aldergrove Credit Union =

- Company type: Credit union
- Predecessor: Otter District Credit Union
- Founded: 1954; 71 years ago
- Defunct: August 1, 2021
- Fate: Merged into G&F Financial Group
- Headquarters: Aldergrove, British Columbia, Canada
- Website: gffg.com

The Aldergrove Credit Union was a credit union in Aldergrove, British Columbia, Canada with approximately 20,000 members and assets around $807m CAD.

In September 2020, Aldergrove Credit Union announced its intention of merging with G&F Financial Group. The merger was completed on August 1, 2021.

== History ==
On October 28, 1940, an Otter District Credit Union came into being with the hope of fulfilling the financial needs of those living in the Otter community. A building was obtained on the corner of 40th Avenue and Otter Road, and the branch was soon opened for business. A system was worked out so that the office would be open one evening a month, as farmers were busy farming during the day.

In February 1954, members of the Otter District Farmers' Institute (ODFI) applied to start a more stable and consistent Credit Union than was currently available in the Otter District Credit Union. By March, they had incorporated as the Otter Farmers' Institute Credit Union (OFICU), and membership was made available only to those who already held membership at the Otter District Farmers' Institute. The membership fee was soon raised to a dollar from the initial price of twenty-five cents. The Credit Committee was composed of five members and the Board of Directors had seven members including the President. The first elected President was David W. Poppy and a local high school still bears his name. In July 1954, the Credit Union Members held the first Annual General Meeting in Poppy's orchard (what is now Poppy Golf Course). Fifty people were in attendance, though some were only prospective members. That year's profits totaled $86.24 and a percentage was presented to the first secretary/treasurer instead of wages. Only four years later, the OFICU had amassed assets of $100,000 and membership had grown to 300 people. By 1963, membership had surpassed 700. The Langley Credit Union was absorbed into the OFI Credit Union in March 1974 pushing total assets past the 10 million dollar mark. In 1979 (the same year that the ODFI became the Otter Co-op), the OFICU also changed its name to the Aldergrove Credit Union, since the Farmers' Institute had ceased to exist.

Ten years after adopting its new name, the Aldergrove Credit Union had grown enough to purchase an insurance company and create Aldergrove Financial Insurance Services. A third branch of the Credit Union was opened in Murrayville in 1994. Most recently, the Matsqui Credit Union was absorbed, pushing Aldergrove Credit Union's assets up to $190 million, its membership to 15,500 and its staff to over 100 people.

While remaining a completely separate entity from the Otter Co-op, there is still a Credit Union branch at the Co-op Shopping Centre, and Otter Co-op is the Credit Union's oldest customer.

Aldergrove Credit Union is part of The Exchange Network owned by FICANEX. Deposits are insured by the Credit Union Deposit Insurance Corporation of British Columbia.
