= Cache Creek Airport =

Airport in British Columbia, Canada

- IATA: YZA; ICAO: none; TC LID: CAZ5

Summary
- Airport type: Public
- Operator: Village of Cache Creek
- Location: Cache Creek, British Columbia
- Time zone: MST (UTC−07:00)
- Elevation AMSL: 2,040 ft (620 m)
- Coordinates: 50°46′30″N 121°19′16″W
- Website: Official website

Map
- Location in British Columbia

Runways
| Direction | Length | | Surface |
| Direction | ft | m | Surface |
|---|---|---|---|
| 15/33 | 3,275 | 998 | Asphalt |
- Source

Cache Creek Airport (IATA: YZA, TC LID: CAZ5), also known as Campbell Hill Regional Airport, or formerly as Ashcroft/Cache Creek Regional Airport, is a Canadian registered aerodrome about 2.2 nautical miles (4.1 km; 2.5 mi) south of Cache Creek, British Columbia.

== Former local landing sites ==
=== Unknown ===
Determining the first aircraft to land in the Ashcroft area is speculative. In December 1932, R.L. (Ginger) Coote arrived with three passengers. A. Eric de Pencier landed in January 1933, followed by B.R. Ronald that September. In October 1934, de Pencier returned.

=== Barnes Lake ===
The lake is about 2.0 nautical miles (3.7 km; 2.3 mi) southeast of Ashcroft. Ginger Coote became district manager for United Air Transport (later renamed Yukon Southern Air Transport). In January 1938, he flew the inaugural Ashcroft–Fort St. John airmail route.

=== Cornwall Field ===
The runway, immediately north of Ashcroft Manor, was completed in February 1938. A United Air Transport Fokker Universal landed that month. A Northern Airways Waco Custom ZQC-6 flew in at this time. From March 1938 to October 1939, the latter used the field as a stopover on the Vancouver–Whitehorse route. In 1939, the DOT erected a radio range station at the site, which provided weather information to aircraft pilots until 1966. During World War II, two trainers from a civil flight training school relocated to the field.

=== Private field ===
After the war, a private airfield was established about 3.0 nautical miles (5.6 km; 3.5 mi) south of Ashcroft, near the present Sundance Guest Ranch. The gravel strip was 823 by 23 metres (2,700 by 75 ft).

=== Ashcroft Airport ===
By 1970, a new field had been built on the Ashcroft 4 First Nations reserve, which is northeast of Ashcroft Manor. It is unclear if the Mesa Vista Airfield was the same or different from this location. The Ashcroft runway was 610-metre (2,000 ft).

Being subject to a year-to-year lease, expenditure on any substantial improvements was unwise. The opening of the current airport ended aircraft use. In 1986, plans to repurpose the site for drag racing began. This facility, called the Nl'akapxm Eagle Motorplex, closed in 2016.

== Present airport ==
The site is halfway up Campbell Hill, named after local pioneer James Campbell, one-time owner of the Bonaparte House in Cache Creek.

In October 1983, the province gave preliminary approval to develop an airstrip at Campbell Hill. Completed in 1984, the airport was largely built by volunteer labour. The work involved moving about 92,000 cubic metres (120,000 yd^{3}) of material for the airstrip and building an access road and fencing.

In March 1985, the grass runway was gravelled. In May, the Aero Club purchased a trailer for club premises. In September, the runway and access road were paved and Premier Bill Bennett officiated at the opening ceremony.

In 1988, extensive cracking discovered in the runway required expensive repairs.

Since 2000, the airport has hosted an annual Mother's Day Fly-In that attracts dozens of planes, which perform an aerial show. In March 2008, Ashcroft Council wished to opt out of the airport joint management with Cache Creek because of considerable operational costs. The next month, Ashcroft agreed to stay as long as planning and management concerns were examined. That December, Ashcroft ended the partnership.

The 2017 a wildfire destroyed two hangars and one house at the airport. Following the fire, the condition and future of the airport were examined, where questions were raised as to the viability of continued use by emergency air ambulances, other first responders, and revenue streams such as film crews. Airport fencing, which was destroyed by the wildfire, was replaced in 2020.

No fuel storage exists on site. The airport is also used for an annual drag racing event.

== Filming location ==
Scenes from the following were shot at the airport:

- Shooter (2007).
- The Andromeda Strain (2008 mini-series).
- Afghan Luke (2011).
