= Don Paquette =

Canadian football player (1939–2017)

Profile
- Positions: offensive guard, defensive end

Personal information
- Born: January 23, 1939; St. Catharines, Ontario
- Died: July 29, 2017 (aged 78); Ashcroft, British Columbia
- Listed height: 5 ft 11 in (1.80 m)
- Listed weight: 225 lb (102 kg)

Career history
- 1958–1960: Hamilton Tiger Cats
- 1961–1963: Montreal Alouettes
- 1964–1964: Toronto Argonauts
- 1965–1965: Calgary Stampeders
- 1965–1965: Montreal Alouettes

Don Paquette (January 23, 1939 – July 29, 2017) was a Canadian Football League player whose main position was offensive guard, but also defensive end. He played for 4 teams from 1958 to 1965.

After playing college football at Niagara-On-The-Lake HS, now Niagara College, Don Paquette joined the Hamilton Tiger Cats in 1958 mostly as an offensive lineman and remained with them until 1960. In 1961, he was involved in a blockbuster trade when he and Bernie Faloney were dealt to the Montreal Alouettes for Hal Patterson and Sam Etcheverry. But since Faloney and Etcheverry exercised their no-trade contract clause, the deal became even up Paquette for Patterson, considered by many people as one of the worst trades in Alouette history. Although Paquette played in all 14 games in 1961 and 1963, he did not stand out and was traded 3 more times before retiring.
