= Otter Co-op =

Consumers' cooperative in British Columbia, Canada

- Type: Consumers' cooperative
- Industry: Retail
- Founded: 1922
- Headquarters: Aldergrove, British Columbia, Canada
- Area served: Langley, British Columbia and surrounding Fraser Valley, Okanagan
- Revenue: $199,599,406
- Operating income: + $24,646,403
- Net income: $5,334,747
- Members: 53,000
- Number of employees: 350-400
- Website: otterco-op.crs
- Footnotes; Statistical information from 2015 and

The Otter Co-op is a consumers' cooperative in Aldergrove, British Columbia, Canada. It placed 37 by revenues on Canada's Top 50 Co-operatives in 2007. Otter Co-op is a member of Federated Co-operatives Limited.

== Organization ==
Management is divided into seven different departments: Administration, Petroleum, Animal Feed, Hardware & Family Fashions, Retail Food, Human Resources, and Credit.

The General Manager who oversees all departments is hired permanently, unlike the Board of Directors.

== Membership & Patronage System ==
Anyone wishing to join the Otter Co-op must fill in an application and pay the $10 lifetime membership fee. Upon acceptance, members will be assigned a membership number as well as a membership card. Memberships can be passed on to anyone of the age of majority. Each dollar spent by a member is totaled and at the end of the year, members are issued a patronage refund of equity, in proportion to this total. The rate of the patronage refund is determined by the finance committee and changes yearly.

In fiscal 2007, the Co-op's sales exceeded $98 million and the percentage projected patronage allocation for 2008 was set at 6.97%.

Each year, a fixed minimum of purchases is also set and members whose purchases surpass that minimum will be awarded a portion of their refund in cash and the rest allocated to their equity account. Members whose purchases totaled less than that minimum have their entire refund added to their equity account. In 1999, the minimum was set to $295 and any member spending more that year would receive 55% (minus taxes) back in the form of a cheque.

Entire equity repayments are made to members who have died, who have turned 69 years of age or who have moved out of the area and are no longer able to make use of the Co-op. Also, no single member may hold more than $25,000 in equity. Any accounts surpassing that limit will receive a cash refund.

== History ==
The Otter District Farmers' Institute (ODFI) incorporated on November 13, 1922. The twenty-five original members, both men and women, had a mandate to promote agricultural awareness and improve life so that settlement would be permanent and prosperous.

In the early part of the twentieth century, the Otter District of British Columbia was sparsely populated and heavily forested. The few hundred farmers attempting to clear the land for agriculture needed stumping powder to blast out tree stumps after the trees had been felled. Costs for the blasting powder and for its transportation were quite high, so the Farmers' Institute began to buy bulk and sell locally to its members, greatly reducing the price. Membership increased and with it, demand for cheap farming products. In 1926, the ODFI began selling animal feed to area farmers. By the end of the decade, the Institute was still selling stumping powder, but also carried hay, clover, barbed wire and fertilizer. By 1946, the number of retail items had increased enough that the ODFI built a grocery and hardware store on 248th street. Starting in 1950, a bulk petroleum plant sold gas and diesel for farm use, as well as home heating oil and propane. The ODFI also organized for monthly speakers to make presentations in the hope of educating local farmers. By 1945, the Co-op had over 160 members in the area. The need for food preservation was brought to their attention, and in 1946, Co-operative Cold Storage Lockers were made available.

While the bulk petroleum plant had been in use since 1950, it was not until 1972 that a gas bar was purchased to sell for gas for automobiles. Trying to maintain relevance in what was fast becoming a modern world, the ODFI converted to an official Co-operative on June 22, 1979 under the Cooperative Association Act. The organization had long encouraged Co-operative values, until this point it was officially considered a society. A new name was chosen to reflect the new status: the Otter Farm & Home Co-operative. On January 17 the following year, they would open a new 50,000-square-foot (4,600 m^{2}) shopping center.

The 1980s were a hard decade for the Otter Farm & Home Co-operative. High interest rates and a nationwide recession lowered consumer confidence and sales were way down. Business became so bad that fears rose as to the Co-op's survival, since mortgage payments on the new shopping center still needed to be made. The former general manager came out of retirement to help keep things going, and employees willingly accepted a reduction in wages in order to help save the Co-op from impending demise. Federated Co-operatives Ltd., the wholesale supplier did what it could to help. By 1983, members were informed that the Co-op had lost $1,891,500.

The Co-op survived, however, due mostly to the heightened support of members even during hard economic times. The increase in sales both at the gas bar and at the bulk petroleum plant also helped to stem the tide of the recession. As the Co-op's financial situation began to turn around, much needed improvements went underway. A new oil storage warehouse was opened in February 1990. In 1997, the gas bar was totally rebuilt for both speed and functionality, and because of environmental concerns. The Co-op celebrated its 75th anniversary the same year with large-scale festivities and a special supplement in a local newspaper commemorating Co-operative involvement in the community. The Co-op's mortgage was finally paid off in 1998, and much needed renovations on the shopping center were started immediately. The improvements were completed in October 1999 without the need for another loan. A new deli was built, the grocery area was enlarged and a fashion boutique was installed.

== Principles ==
- Membership is kept open and voluntary. Anyone may join, but non-members are quite welcome to make purchases in all departments.
- Democratic control with one vote for each member. Membership includes the right to attend Annual General Meetings and vote for Board of Directors, as well as the right to run in the election. Each position on the board is for a three-year term and candidates are limited to three consecutive terms on the board.
- Co-operative education. Directors are all given the opportunity to upgrade their skills, particularly at regional and national Co-operative conferences. The Co-op regularly gives $500 post-secondary scholarships to graduating high school students and supports four local 4H clubs.
- Co-operation among Co-operatives. Otter Co-op has invested substantial capital in its wholesale supplier, Federated Co-operatives Limited based out of Saskatoon. In addition, large donations and discounts are regularly made to non-profit organizations within the community.
- Otter Co-op makes no promises to keep prices below those of their competitors, but it guarantees high-quality products and excellent service.

== See also ==
- Aldergrove Credit Union
