= Interior Savings Credit Union =

Credit union in British Columbia, Canada

- Trade name: Interior Savings
- Company type: Credit union
- Industry: Financial services
- Founded: 1939
- Headquarters: Kelowna, British Columbia, Canada
- Key people: Brian Harris (CEO)
- Revenue: C$82.55 million (2022)
- Net income: C$8.38 million (2022)
- Total assets: C$3.1 billion (2022)
- Website: interiorsavings.com

Interior Savings Credit Union operated as a member-owned financial co-operative headquartered in Kelowna, British Columbia. Established in 1939, the branch network expanded by multiple mergers and became one of the larger BC credit unions. The 2024 merger with Gulf & Fraser created the Beem Credit Union.

== Interior Savings Credit Union ==
In 1939, the Kelowna and District Credit Union was established as the fourth chartered credit union in BC. In 1995, the name changed to the Interior Savings Credit Union (ISCU). In 1996, Vernon became the first branch outside of Kelowna.

Following the Thompson Valley Savings merger in 2002, 79,000 members spanned across 20 branches at the briefly renamed Thompson Interior Savings Credit Union, prior to resuming the ISCU name.

Merging into the ISCU were the Spruce Credit Union in 2022 and the North Peace Savings and Credit Union in 2023. At the time of the 2024 merger with Gulf & Fraser to create the Beem Credit Union, the ISCU comprised 90,000 members, 25 branches, 15 insurance offices, and was the seventh largest credit union in BC.

== Okanagan Savings Credit Union ==
In 1939, the Oliver Credit Union (OCU) was incorporated with an initial 25 members. In 1942, the Okanagan Falls Credit Union (OFCU) was formed.

The OFCU merged into the OCU to form the Okanagan Savings Credit Union in 1971. Comprising Oliver, Osoyoos, and Okanagan Falls branches, the latter merged into the Thompson Valley Savings Credit Union in 2000.

== Thompson Valley Savings Credit Union ==
The North Kamloops and District Credit Union was established in 1941 and renamed the North Kamloops Savings Credit Union in 1961.

The Chase and District Credit Union was established in 1953.

North Kamloops Savings was renamed the Thompson Valley Credit Union in 1966, into which the Chase Credit Union and North Shuswap Credit Union merged around 1968. During the 1970s, the name amended to the Thompson Valley Savings Credit Union (TVSCU) and the branch network comprised Kamloops, Kamloops North, Chase, Barriere, and Clearwater.

In 2000, the Okanagan Savings Credit Union merged into the TVSCU, which months earlier had acquired the Bank of Montreal branch operations in Ashcroft and Merritt.

In 2002, the TVSCU, merged into the ISCU to become the sixth largest credit union in BC.

== Nicola Valley and District Credit Union ==
The Princeton Credit Union was established in 1941 and the Merritt Credit Union in 1961. The Merritt and District Savings and Credit Union merged into the Princeton Credit Union in 1966 to become the Princeton-Merritt District Credit Union. The branch network expanded to Ashcroft in 1970 and Lillooet in 1972, changing the name to the Yale District Credit Union.

The Merritt branch separated to create the Nicola Valley and District Credit Union (NVDCU) in 1973, under which name the prior operations rejoined in 1982. The Kamloops branch of the Dogwood Credit Union was acquired in 1994.

In 1998, the NVDCU merged into the TVSCU.

== North Peace Savings and Credit Union ==
Formed in 1947, the North Peace Savings and Credit Union membership was 1,930 by 1960.

The Credit Union Deposit Insurance Corporation assumed supervision in 1980 when problems arose from too rapid expansion. To address a liquidity crisis in 1986, the BC credit union movement provided a $7.6 million loan to protect the 9,500 members.

By 2016, the branches at Fort St. John, Fort Nelson, Hudson's Hope, and Taylor served the 13,300 members. By the time of the merger into the ISCU in 2023, the Taylor branch had closed.

== Spruce Credit Union ==
In 1951, Prince George Roman Catholics formed the Sacred Heart Credit Union. Membership, which was also open to non-Catholics, totalled 60 after three months and 160 eight months later.

The name changed to the Spruce Credit Union (SCU) in the mid-1970s.

By 2000, the membership exceeded 8,000.

The SCU comprised 7,000 members across two branches at the time of the 2022 merger into the ISCU.
