= Nl'akapxm Eagle Motorplex =

Dragstrip in Ashcroft, British Columbia

Coordinates: 50.729740°N 121.321326°W

- Location: Ashcroft, British Columbia
- Operator: Ashcroft Indian Band
- Opened: 1987
- Closed: 2016

IHRA Dragstrip
- Length: 0.4 km (0.25 mi)
- Turns: 3

Nl'akapxm Eagle Motorplex was a ¼ mile IHRA-sanctioned dragstrip located near Ashcroft and Cache Creek, British Columbia.

The motorplex was begun in 1980 on the Ashcroft/Cache Creek Aero Club's old airstrip by Les Edmonds, the leader of the Ashcroft Indian Band. Racing began in 1987 and the track has been under NHRA sanctioning throughout until the 2010 season when it became AHRA sanctioned. In 2011, the track has been under IHRA sanctioning. The name of the track, Nl'akapxm, is pronounced IN-clap-cappum; this is the local dialect variant of the native name for the Thompson nation whose territory extends from Cache Creek south to just north of Seattle.

The motorplex won the NHRA Division 6 Track Of The Year Award in 1990, 1991, and 2003.

On April 27 2016, the operators of the Nl'akapxm Eagle Motorplex announced that after more than 28 years in business it was immediately ceasing operations. Reasons included a declining car count and numerous technical and mechanical issues that led to not only expensive repairs but difficulties in finding qualified personnel able to repair the facility.

== Track Information ==
Dragstrip:

- 1700' elevation, dry climate
- Roll-down staging area
- 330' concrete launch pad
- 60' track width
- Uphill shutdown
- Paved Return Roads
- Compulink timing with auto-start
- Wireless public address at 99.3 FM and 530 AM
