= 105 Mile Lake =

Lake in British Columbia, Canada

- Location of the lake in British Columbia 105 Mile Lake (Canada)
- Location: 105 Mile House, British Columbia
- Coordinates: 51.714°N 121.329°W
- Primary inflows: None
- Primary outflows: None
- Basin countries: Canada

105 Mile Lake is a small lake near the town of 105 Mile House. Both are named for their distance from Lillooet via the Old Cariboo Road.

== See also ==
- List of lakes of British Columbia
