= Gulf & Fraser =

Credit union in British Columbia, Canada

Gulf and Fraser Fishermen's Credit Union
- Trade name: Gulf & Fraser
- Company type: Credit union
- Industry: Financial services
- Founded: 1940
- Headquarters: Burnaby, British Columbia, Canada
- Key people: Jeff Shewfelt (co-CEO); Bill Kiss (co-CEO)
- Revenue: C$82.47 million (2021)
- Net income: C$20.99 million (2021)
- Total assets: C$4.1 billion (2021)
- Subsidiaries: Gulf and Fraser Insurance Services Ltd.
- Website: www.gulfandfraser.com

Gulf and Fraser Fishermen's Credit Union, operating as Gulf & Fraser, is a member-owned financial institution in Burnaby, British Columbia, Canada, and is the sixth largest credit union in British Columbia by asset size. With a history dating back to 1940, Gulf & Fraser provides banking and a variety of financial services including borrowing, investments and financial planning. It is insured by the Credit Union Deposit Insurance Corporation of British Columbia, a crown corporation that insures the deposits of credit union members.

== History ==
Gulf & Fraser's history extends back to 1940, when a group of BC fishermen incorporated the North Arm Fisherman's Credit Union. Since that time, the credit union has gone through over 30 mergers and many name changes. One of the most significant mergers occurred in 2004 when United Savings Credit Union merged with Gulf and Fraser Fishermen's Credit Union. Another notable merger was with Pioneer Credit Union — the third credit union to be chartered in British Columbia. Pioneer Credit Union was granted charter number 003, which G&F retained for the merged entity.

In August 2021, G&F Financial Group merged with Aldergrove Credit Union and on January 1, 2022, G&F Financial Group merged with V.P. Credit Union and Mount Lehman Credit Union. The combined organization has 26 branches located in the Lower Mainland and Fraser Valley and a membership of over 61,000. In November 2023, the credit union announced that a vote to merge with Interior Savings was successful, with a newly branded Beem Credit Union to have combined assets under administration exceeding $10 billion, effective January 1, 2024.

Gulf & Fraser's administration office is located at Suite 401 - 7300 Edmonds Street, Burnaby, British Columbia, V3N 0G8, Canada.

== Predecessors ==
The following is a partial list of credit unions that form part of Gulf & Fraser's history either through name changes, mergers or acquisitions:

- North Arm Fisherman's Credit Union
- Lower Fraser Fishermen's Credit Union
- Common Good Co-Operative Association
- Pioneer Credit Union
- C.E.F.U. #28 Credit Union
- Civic Employees Credit Union
- United Services Credit Union
- Mount Pleasant Credit Union
- Burnaby Savings Credit Union
- Allied Savings Credit Union
- Finning Employees Credit Union
- United Savings Credit Union
- Burlington Northern Credit Union
- Sheet Metal Workers Credit Union
- Elco Credit Union (BC Hydro Employees)
- Aldergrove Credit Union
- V.P. Credit Union
- Mount Lehman Credit Union

== Community Involvement ==
On February 25, 2021, G&F Financial Group announced their exclusive sponsorship of the Personal Finance program for high school students, run by Junior Achievement British Columbia. The credit union also donated $20,000 into the program.

In 2020, G&F Financial Group, the Board of Directors, employees, partners and sponsors gave $575,000 to local community groups, scholarship and bursary programs, charities, and cultural and sports organizations. This included three major charitable fundraisers where employees, partners and sponsors raised $170,000.

On December 30, 2020, G&F Financial Group announced a donation of $80,000 to local charities and groups impacted by the COVID-19 pandemic. Of that, $60,000 went to local food banks, shelters, and hospitals, which were among some of the hardest hit by the COVID-19 pandemic.

On September 28, 2020, G&F Financial Group announced a donation of $132,000 to The Centre for Child Development in Surrey, BC. This was the second year of their three-year fundraising commitment for the Centre, which helps children with special needs reach their potential. The Centre provides physiotherapy, family services, childcare, communication and occupational therapy, and recreation services to thousands of children in Metro Vancouver.

On January 7, 2020, G&F Financial Group announced they had reached a milestone of $1 million in donations to the United Way of the Lower Mainland since they started fundraising in 2001.

On September 9, 2019, G&F Financial Group donated $124,680 to The Centre for Child Development. The Centre helps children with special needs reach their potential; it provides physiotherapy, family services, childcare, communication and occupational therapy, and recreation services to thousands of children in Metro Vancouver. Funds were raised through G&F's annual golf tournament and matched by an anonymous foundation.

On June 2, 2019, G&F Financial Group presented a cheque for $26,000 to BC Children's Hospital Foundation during their Miracle Weekend event. G&F employees raised funds for the Foundation through a variety of events, including 50/50 draws, Jeans Day, music trivia, sports jersey draws, Bingo games, and by selling Purdy’s chocolates.

On January 8, 2019, G&F Financial Group announced they had donated $54,000 to the United Way of the Lower Mainland. Funds will go towards the welfare of children and breaking the cycle of poverty. Over the lifetime of G&F's campaign, the credit union has donated close to $880,000 to the United Way of the Lower Mainland.

In 2018, G&F Financial Group, the Board of Directors, employees, partners and sponsors gave $532,000 to the communities that they serve, distributed in the form of donations, sponsorships, educational bursaries, scholarships and through the G&F Financial Group Foundation.

On September 20, 2018, G&F Financial Group announced they had donated $100,000 to the Richmond Hospital Foundation. The funds will support the foundation's ACT NOW campaign to build a much-needed acute care tower. The funds were raised through two events held by the credit union: a special retirement dinner and their annual charity golf tournament.

On November 2, 2011, the South Burnaby Branch of G&F Financial Group was the winner of the Burnaby Board of Trade's Business Excellence Community Spirit Award. The award recognizes local organizations for demonstrating outstanding corporate social responsibility and for the strong support of local non-profit organizations and agencies.
