= Ashcroft, British Columbia =

Village in British Columbia

Ashcroft
- Village
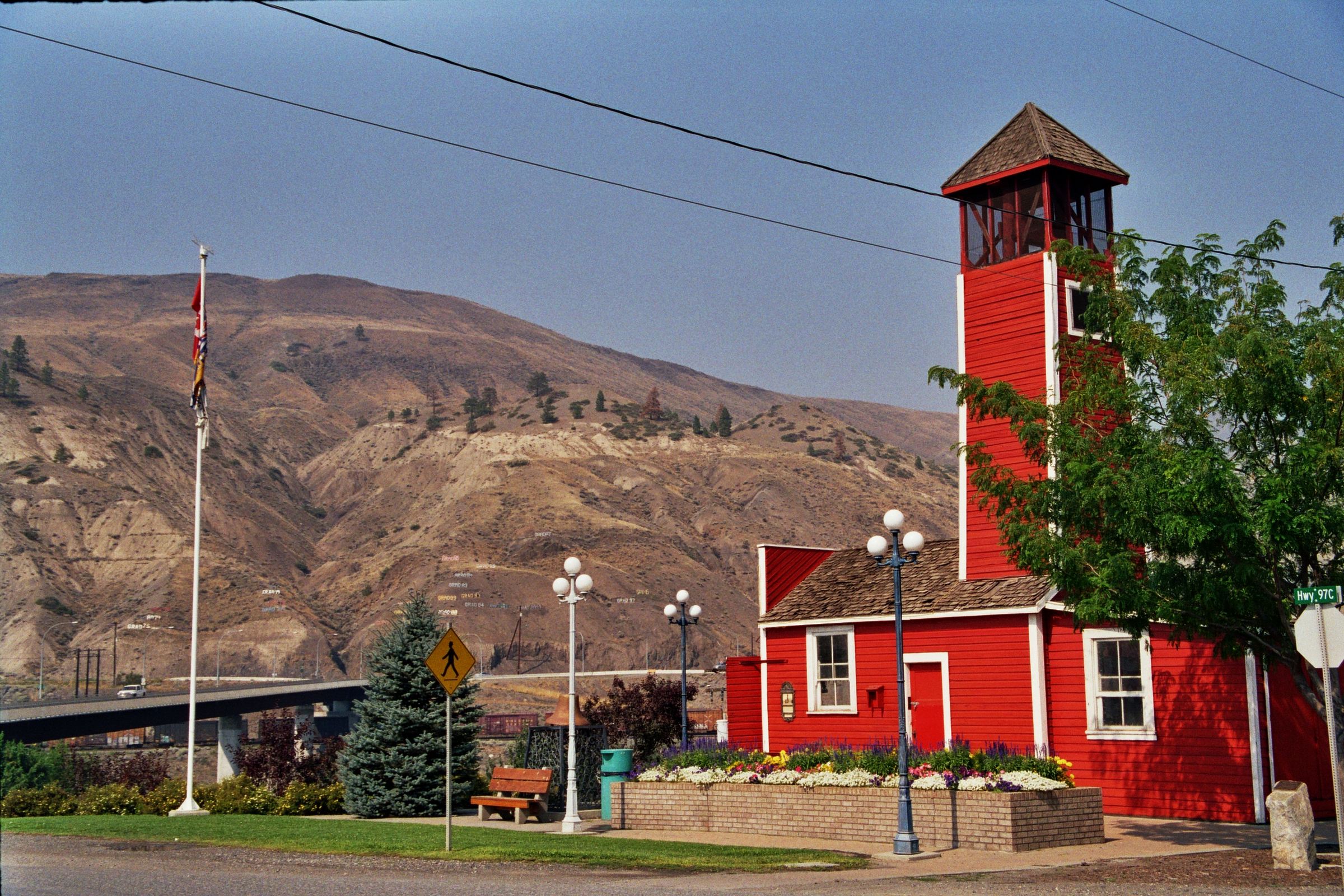
- Fire hall from 1919, Ashcroft, 2006

- Location of Ashcroft in British Columbia
- Coordinates: 50°43′16″N 121°17′01″W
- Country: Canada
- Province: British Columbia
- Region: Thompson Country
- Regional District: Thompson-Nicola
- Founded: 1883
- Incorporated as a Village: 1952

Government
  - Type: Elected village council
  - Mayor: Barbara Roden
  - Governing body: Ashcroft Village Council
  - MP: Brad Vis (CPC)
  - MLA: Jackie Tegart (BCU)

Area
  - Total: 50.86 km^{2} (19.64 sq mi)
- Elevation: 335.2 m (1,100 ft)

Population (2021)
  - Total: 1,670
  - Density: 32.8/km^{2} (85.0/sq mi)
- Time zone: UTC−07:00 (PT)
- Postal Code: V0K 1A0
- Area codes: 250, 778, 236, & 672
- Highways: Highway 97C
- Waterways: Thompson River
- Website: www.ashcroftbc.ca

Ashcroft is a village municipality that straddles the Thompson River in the Thompson Country region of south central British Columbia, Canada. East of BC Highway 1 and on BC Highway 97C, the locality is by road about 45 kilometres (28 mi) north of Spences Bridge and 11 kilometres (7 mi) south of Cache Creek.

== Pioneers ==
Established by brothers Clement Francis Cornwall and Henry Pennant Cornwall in 1862, the earliest mention of the name Ashcroft farm was 1863. That year, the brothers opened a roadhouse. The property lay on the Cariboo Road about 3 kilometres (2 mi) due west of the river. The earliest newspaper mention of the name Ashcroft as a locality was 1865. In partnership with E.William Brink, John Christopher Barnes established a ranch in 1868 on the east shore of the river.

The post office at the Ashcroft farm opened before 1872 but closed in 1899. Jerome Harper built a gristmill in 1877 on the west shore at the mouth of the Bonaparte River. John Craig had a ranch on that side of the Thompson. Harper, Barnes, Brink, and Craig built a wagon road from the mill to the Cariboo Road. When Brink died in 1879, his heirs received the eastern part of the partnership property and the Barnes family gained the western part. In the early 1880s, the Brink son-in-law Oliver Evans managed the family property. Evans and John Barnes built the small Thompson River Hotel at the ferry landing. In 1884, Barnes moved the hotel to opposite the train station and surveyed the townsite on his ranch.

== Ferries and road bridges ==
In the late 1860s, Barnes installed a ferry. In 1883, the government took over ferry operations, which continued until 1885.

The construction of a bridge across the Thompson and a road connection to the Cariboo road took place during 1884 to 1886. The 201.7-metre (661 ft 8 in) structure comprised six spans.

When the 1894 flood took out the bridge, a rowboat was used until a proper cable ferry was installed. In 1895, a new bridge was completed.

During the replacement of the bridge in 1906, three of the five construction workers on a scow drowned when it capsized. In 1907, the crossing opened. That year, Ike Decker, acting deputy in the absence of the constable, was killed just downstream in a gunfight with two outlaws passing in a boat.

In 1916–17, the washed-out bridge was replaced. In 1918, a larger ferry replaced the smaller one, assumedly when the bridge was out.

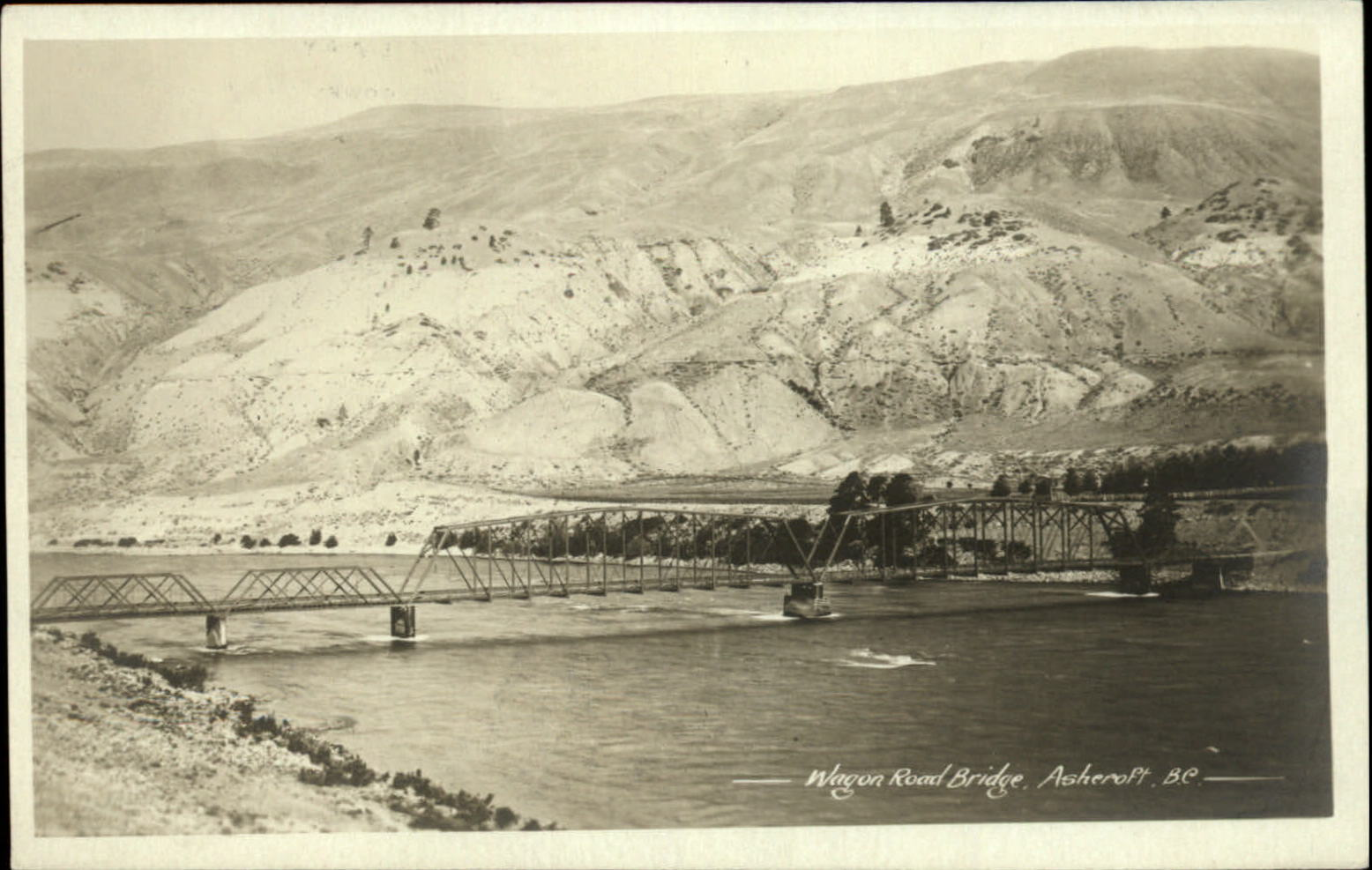
Westward view of wagon road bridge, Ashcroft, c.1920

In 1929, the bridge was almost lost to fire.

In 1932, a 238-metre (780 ft) concrete and steel bridge was completed. The badly rotted former bridge was dynamited. Herded cattle were usually hesitant to cross the new bridge.

In 1969–70, the bridge sidewalk was widened.

In 1991, the present bridge opened.

== Railways ==
In summer 1884, the Canadian Pacific Railway (CP) built a log bunkhouse and station at the new townsite. The structure was the standard-design (Bohi's Type 5) single-storey station building with gable roof and dormers (identical to Keefers). In early December, the eastward advance of the CP rail head from Port Moody passed through the townsite. Initially called St. Cloud by the railway (after St. Cloud, the access point to the Red River Trails on the Saint Paul and Pacific Railroad), the name did not last. The post office, which opened in 1886, was named Ashcroft Station. However, the settlement was equally known as Barnes.

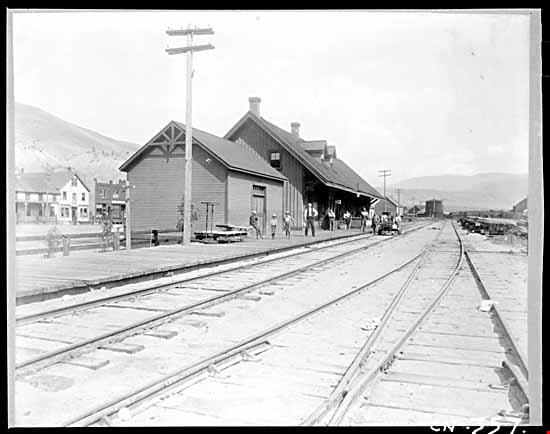
CP Station, Ashcroft, 1899

In 1960, the station was replaced. The present mobile station building dates from about 2020. The CP Ashcroft passing track is 2.6 kilometres (8,645 ft).

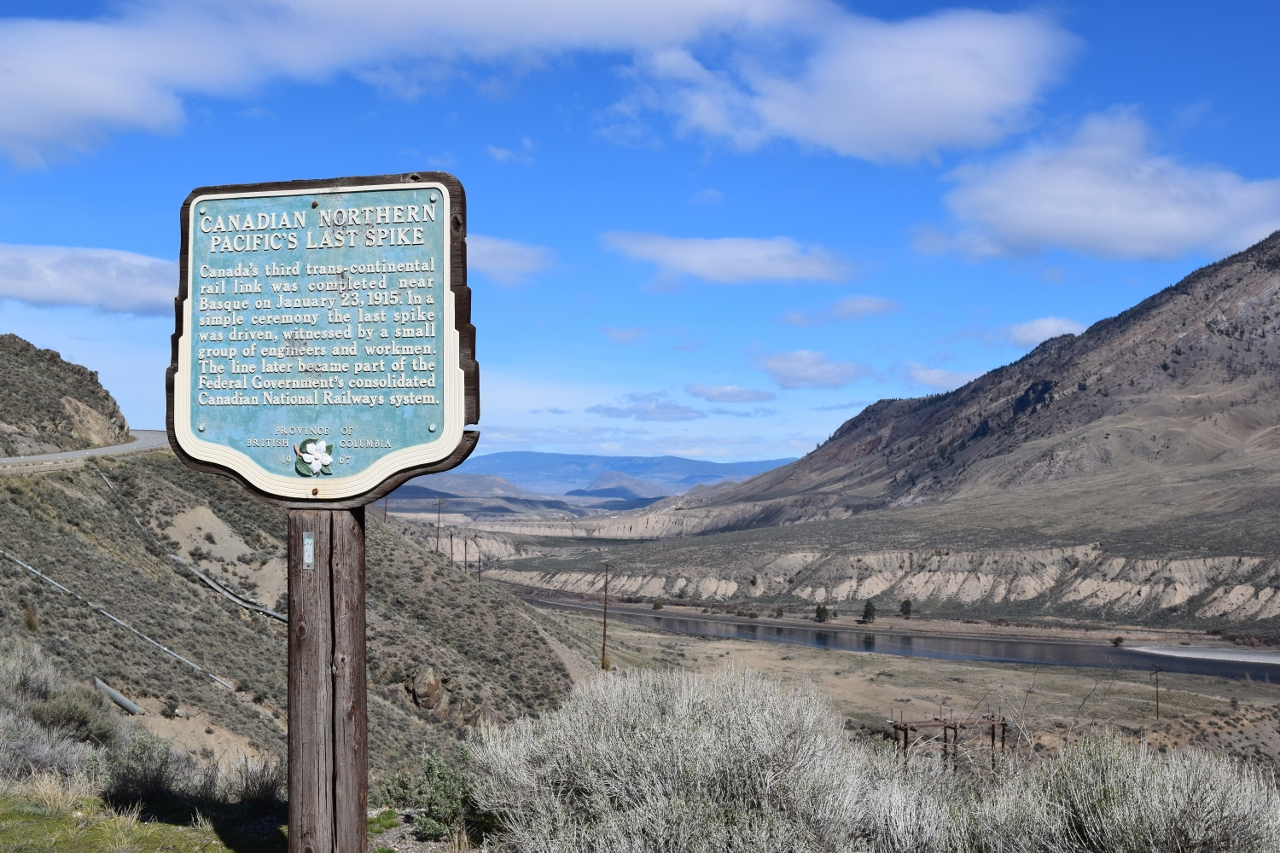
1915 last spike plaque, near Basque

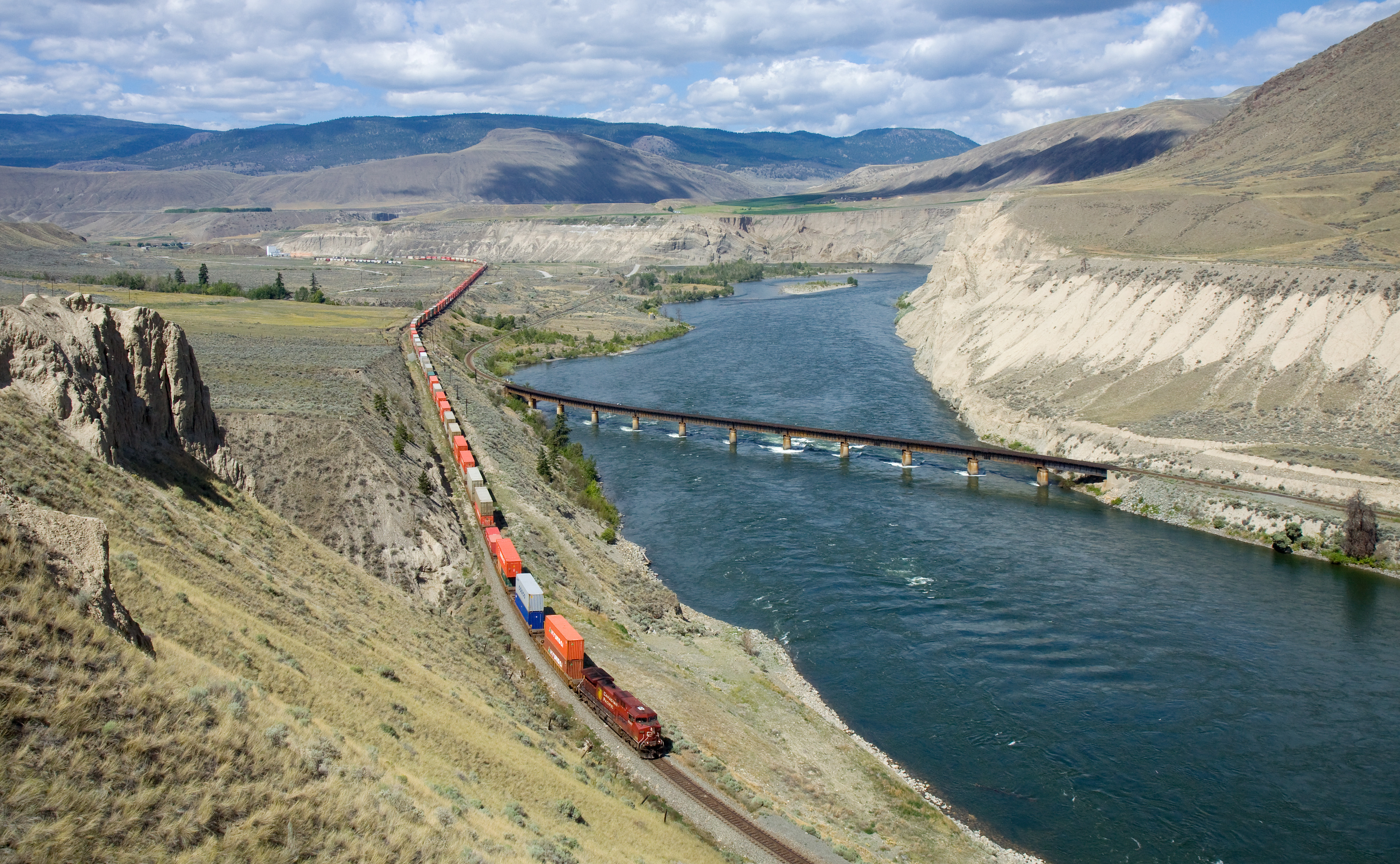
Westward view of CN bridge and CP Terminal (background), Ashcroft, 2011

In February 1912, the 244-metre (800 ft) Canadian Northern Railway (CNoR) tunnel at Black Canyon was virtually completed.

The Ashcroft flag stop, identified only by a pole in the ground, serves Via Rail's The Canadian.

== Earlier community ==
Thos. G. Kirkspatrick was the inaugural postmaster 1886–1888. In 1886, BC Express (BCX) relocated its headquarters to Ashcroft, and the place became Mile 0 on the Cariboo Road, where passengers and freight switched from trains to stagecoaches or freight wagons for a northward journey. In 1887, the Cargile Hotel was dismantled at Hat Creek, reassembled at Ashcroft, blown down by the wind, restored, destroyed by fire, and rebuilt. In 1889, the cemetery was established. By that time, hotels and four Chinese businesses existed. Opened that year, the town hall was renamed the opera house in the later 1890s.

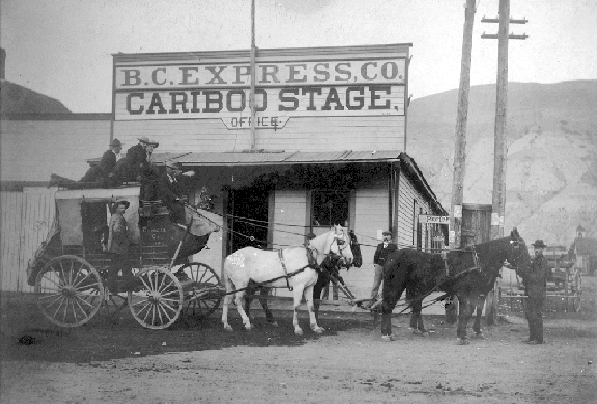
BC Express stage, Ashcroft, 1905

In 1890, the gristmill closed. From the 1890s, Ashcroft potatoes were renowned throughout Canada for decades. Churches built were the Anglican in 1891, Presbyterian in 1892, and Methodist in 1897. In 1892, the Cargile Hotel again burned down and was rebuilt. Launched as The BC Mining Journal in 1895, the newspaper was renamed the Ashcroft Journal in 1899. The customs office operated 1897–1929. In 1898, a consortium installed electricity and water supply systems. That year, a firehall and a Bank of British North America branch opened. During that decade, the annual Ashcroft Grand Ball and the Ashcroft Teamsters Ball were renowned, and the large agricultural fair at least equalled the Kamloops one. By 1899, the population exceeded 600. The village had eight Chinese businesses, three churches, a bank, a county court, hydroelectricity, and a water supply system.

In 1901, the telegraph line from Ashcroft to the Yukon was completed. By 1905, three hotels, nine stores, and government buildings at Ashcroft served the transportation hub, ranches, and mines.

In 1910, a Northern Crown Bank branch opened. In 1913, the Lady Minto, the first hospital, opened. In 1914, when BCX lost the mail contract, stage services ceased, but two steamboats remained in operation. The completion of the Grand Trunk Pacific Railway (GTP) in 1914, which connected Prince George and the coast, further reduced the BCX traffic at Ashcroft, leading to a sharp decline in business and the local population. In 1916, a fire which started on the second floor of the Ashcroft Hotel destroyed five blocks, including Chinatown, three hotels (Ashcroft, Grand Central, Cargile), and several businesses. The Ashcroft Hotel was rebuilt. In 1918, the branch of the Northern Crown Bank became a Royal Bank of Canada and the Bank of British North America became a Bank of Montreal.

In 1920, the BCX office closed but the building (Railway/6th) was later used as a courthouse. By that time, the opera house was primarily used as a picture theatre. Over the following decades, agriculture and a local cannery sustained the local economy. In 1923, the Royal Bank closed. The Ashcroft Cannery produced a variety of tomato products 1925–1957. Chinese gardeners dominated the tomato industry in Ashcroft to the point that there were no Euro-Canadian growers in the area in 1926.

In the early 1930s, Greyhound began a Nelson–Ashcroft service. The hospital building was extended in 1938 and 1956. Greyhound acquired in 1943 the I.T. (Interior Transportation) stage route stretching to the north Cariboo. The next year, the Brown triplets were born.

The Village of Ashcroft was incorporated in 1952. The Roman Catholic church was erected in 1956. The predecessor to BC Hydro acquired the Ashcroft electricity supply system in 1953. The next year, the completion of the transmission line from Lillooet connected Ashcroft to the electricity grid.

Opened in 1961, the Sands Hotel burned down in 1986. Copper mining, which supported the economy from 1962, later consolidated into the Highland Valley Copper mine. That year, the municipal boundaries extended. A CIBC branch operated 1969–1985.

In 1970, the Princeton-Merritt District Credit Union opened a branch. Replacing the former 29-bed facility, a 41-bed acute care hospital opened in 1972 in North Ashcroft. Fire destroyed the original part of the vacant Lady Minto building in 1981. In 1974, three guests died when the Ashcroft Hotel burned to the ground. Opened in 1975, the arena burned down the following year. In 1977, a suspected arson destroyed a downtown block. In 1979, the movie theatre closed, but during 2005–2008 a live music and dinner theatre operated in the building.

In July 1983, the Ashcroft centennial weekend took place. The new courthouse completed that year burned down in 1995. Prior to the opening of the Cache Creek Airport in 1984, various landing strips had existed in the Ashcroft area for decades. The completion of the Coquihalla Highway in 1986 diverted vehicle traffic away from BC Highway 1. In 1987, the municipal building was erected on the Lady Minto site. The 1956 wing now houses some social services.

== Education ==
On rehabilitating the former CP construction bunkhouse, the first school was established in 1886. After the teacher left in 1887, the building was abandoned and burned down in the 1916. The second school, built in 1889–90, was later enlarged to a two-room facility. Around 1900, the old school was demolished and a two-storey building was erected containing two classrooms. In 1916, a third classroom was added. The building was later used as a community hall. In 1922, the four-room Lady Byng School (grades 1–12) was built at the south end of town.

In 1945, the superior school added a senior high grade to become the Senior High-Elementary School. The implementation of the 1945 Cameron Report created School District 30 Ashcroft.

In 1950, the four-classroom Ashcroft High School opened. Rooms were later added. In 1956, the district rename was School District 30 South Cariboo. The school at the south end became known as Coppervale Elementary. The school closed in 1988 and the site sold for redevelopment in 1994.

During 1983–1985, the school principal sexually abused seven minors to which he later pleaded guilty. He was designated a dangerous offender and received an indeterminate prison sentence in 1986, but obtained work release in 1998 and full parole in 2003.

In December 1962, the two-room Ashcroft Elementary (grades 6–7) opened in North Ashcroft. In 1965, four more classrooms and an activity room were added. Expanded in 1969 (grades K–7), the school closed in 2015.

In 1973, the new Ashcroft Secondary School opened in north Ashcroft. A female teacher, who sexually exploited two students during 1987–1989, received a one-year prison sentence. In 1996, School Districts 29 and 30 amalgamated to form School District 74 Gold Trail. In 2015, the high school was reconfigured as the Desert Sands Community School (grades K–12).

In 1993, the University College of the Cariboo (UCC) established a branch within the high school.

== Notable people ==
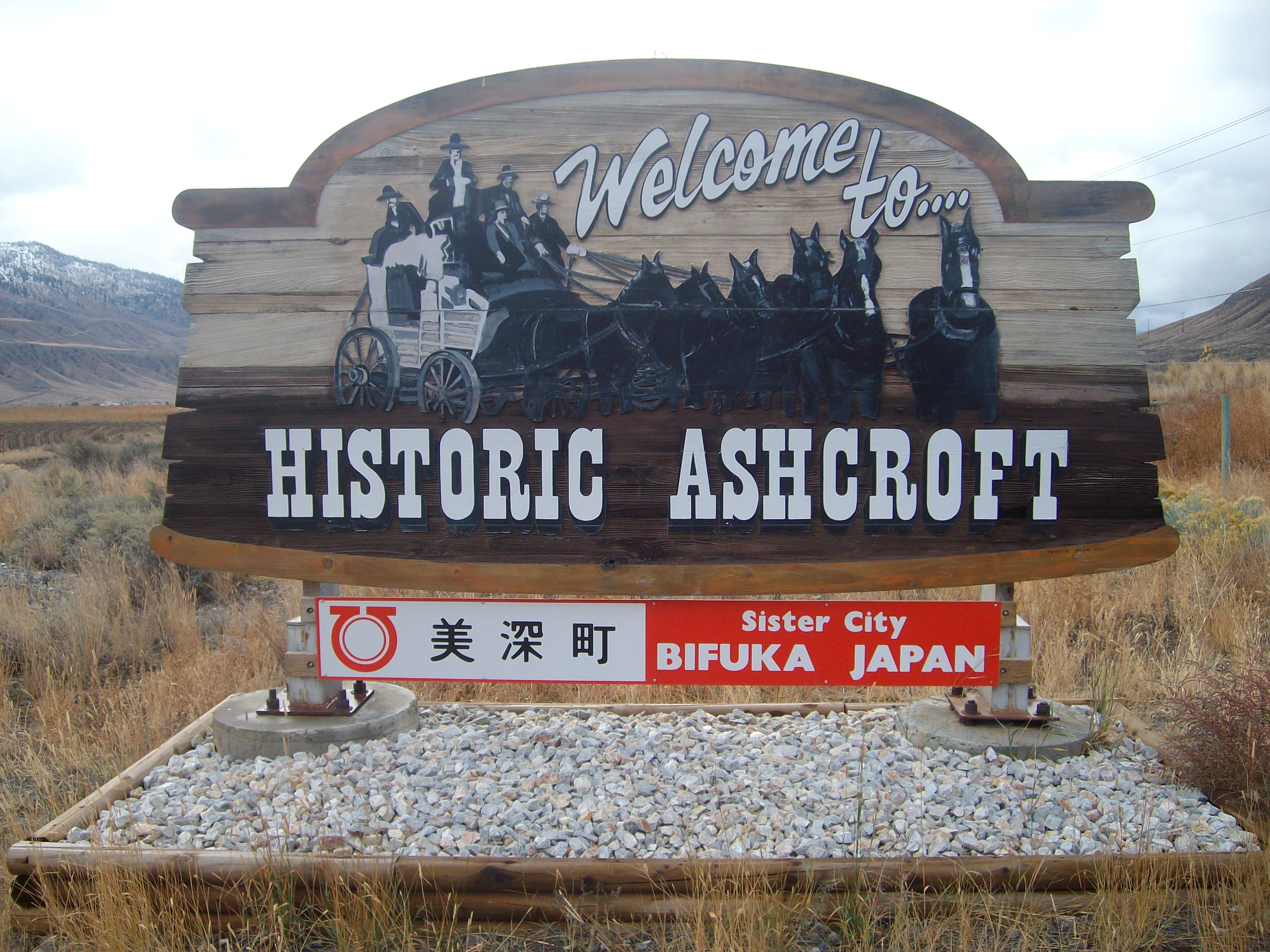
Welcome sign, Ashcroft

- Eric Brewer (1979– ), ice hockey player, resident
- Jean-Jacques Caux, aka Cataline (c.1830–1922), pack train operator, resident
- Ralph Chetwynd (1890–1957), businessman and politician, resident
- Stuart Alexander Henderson (1863–1945), politician and lawyer, resident
- Mervyn Huston (1912–2001), pharmacologist, resident
- Alexander Lucas (1852–1942), politician, resident
- William Garland McQuarrie (1876–1943), politician, resident
- Denis Murphy (1870–1947), politician and superior court judge, resident
- James Murphy (1872–1921), lawyer and politician, resident
- William Cameron Murphy (1905–1961), lawyer and military officer, resident
- Frank Oberle Jr. (1957– ), politician, place of birth
- Don Paquette (1939–2017), football player, place of death
- Casey Pierro-Zabotel (1988– ), ice hockey player, place of birth
- Barbara Roden (1963– ), publisher and politician, resident
- Charles Augustus Semlin (1836–1927), politician, resident
- T. David Somerville (1915–2011), religious leader, place of birth
- Jackie Tegart (1956– ), politician, resident
- Stephen Tingley (1839–1915), capitalist, resident

== Later community ==
In 2000, the Thompson Valley Savings Credit Union acquired the Bank of Montreal branch operations in Ashcroft and Merritt. That year, Heritage Place Park opened. In 2001, a fire raged through a block of downtown historic wooden buildings. In 2004, Ashcroft municipal boundaries expanded to include the Ashcroft Ranch. Since coming in 2007, Marina Papais has been creating the stained-glass artworks displayed throughout the village. In 2008, BC Transit commenced a Clinton–Cache Creek–Ashcroft service. That year, ongoing First Nations opposition compelled the Greater Vancouver Regional District (GVRD) to abandon plans to succeed the Cache Creek landfill by creating a new facility on the Ashcroft Ranch site, which was acquired in 2000.

Twinned in 1994 with a sister town of Bifuka, Hokkaido, delegations visited each town in 2013 and 2014 respectively. When the former Ashcroft Elementary School was vacated in 2015, the HUB repurposed the building as a community centre. In 2016, the post office, which was built in 1980, received an interior remodelling. In 2017, the Elephant Hill wildfire burned on the east side of the river from about 3 kilometres (2 mi) southwest of the highway bridge to over 100 kilometres (62 mi) northeast. In May 2018, Greyhound axed the Cache Creek–Hope route. That month, the Ash-Creek TV Society discontinued its TV service to focus on its radio station CFMA at 105.9 FM.

In 2021, the Legacy Park Campground upgraded all sites to 30 amp service with sewer drops and added four new tenting sites. In 2022, a new urgent and primary care centre opened at the hospital.

Census population: Ashcroft
Year	Pop.	±%
1956	805	—
1961	868	+7.8%
1966	1,154	+32.9%
1971	1,916	+66.0%
1976	2,032	+6.1%
1981	2,156	+6.1%
1986	1,914	−11.2%
1991	1,714	−10.4%
1996	1,858	+8.4%
2001*	1,814	−2.4%
2006	1,664	−8.3%
2011	1,628	−2.2%
2016	1,558	−4.3%
2021	1,670	+7.2%
Source: Statistics Canada * Revised figure

Emergency services include a volunteer fire department and RCMP detachment. Ashcroft is also a retirement community. The current passenger transit provider is BC Transit, which offers a request service.

== Maps ==
- Mining District of the Cariboo. 1887.
- "Rand McNally BC map". www.davidrumsey.com. 1925.
- "Standard Oil BC map". www.davidrumsey.com. 1937.
- "Shell BC map". www.davidrumsey.com. 1956.

== Demographics ==
In the 2021 Census of Population conducted by Statistics Canada, Ashcroft had a population of 1,670 living in 793 of its 876 total private dwellings, a change of 7.2% from its 2016 population of 1,558. With a land area of 50.86 km^{2} (19.64 sq mi), it had a population density of 32.8/km^{2} (85.0/sq mi) in 2021.

Religious groups in Ashcroft included:

- Irreligion (1,000 persons or 61.9%)
- Christianity (590 persons or 36.5%)

== Climate ==
Ashcroft has a dry semi-arid climate (Köppen climate classification BSk). Ashcroft is frequently one of the hottest places in BC in the summer and has the third-highest temperature ever recorded in Canada. It also has short, moderate winters with light snowfall. Parts of Ashcroft along the Thompson River gorge are sufficiently arid to be classified as a desert. This microclimate forms the only true desert in Canada.

Climate data for Ashcroft
Month	Jan	Feb	Mar	Apr	May	Jun	Jul	Aug	Sep	Oct	Nov	Dec	Year
Record high °C (°F)	17.0 (62.6)	17.5 (63.5)	24.5 (76.1)	32.0 (89.6)	38.5 (101.3)	48.1 (118.6)	42.5 (108.5)	41.1 (106.0)	40.8 (105.4)	31.0 (87.8)	23.7 (74.7)	17.5 (63.5)	48.1 (118.6)
Mean daily maximum °C (°F)	0.7 (33.3)	5.0 (41.0)	12.4 (54.3)	17.8 (64.0)	22.3 (72.1)	25.9 (78.6)	29.6 (85.3)	29.7 (85.5)	24.2 (75.6)	14.7 (58.5)	5.9 (42.6)	0.1 (32.2)	15.7 (60.3)
Daily mean °C (°F)	−2.4 (27.7)	0.8 (33.4)	6.4 (43.5)	11.0 (51.8)	15.4 (59.7)	19.1 (66.4)	22.1 (71.8)	22.1 (71.8)	17.1 (62.8)	9.5 (49.1)	2.4 (36.3)	−2.8 (27.0)	10.1 (50.1)
Mean daily minimum °C (°F)	−5.6 (21.9)	−3.4 (25.9)	0.4 (32.7)	4.2 (39.6)	8.4 (47.1)	12.3 (54.1)	14.6 (58.3)	14.4 (57.9)	10.0 (50.0)	4.3 (39.7)	−1.0 (30.2)	−5.7 (21.7)	4.4 (39.9)
Record low °C (°F)	−25.5 (−13.9)	−23.0 (−9.4)	−16.8 (1.8)	−8.1 (17.4)	−1.0 (30.2)	4.0 (39.2)	6.0 (42.8)	6.0 (42.8)	0.0 (32.0)	−19.5 (−3.1)	−29.0 (−20.2)	−28.8 (−19.8)	−29.0 (−20.2)
Average precipitation mm (inches)	23 (0.9)	14.1 (0.56)	13 (0.5)	12.7 (0.50)	25.6 (1.01)	34.9 (1.37)	27.8 (1.09)	18.5 (0.73)	24.3 (0.96)	22 (0.9)	22.6 (0.89)	28.7 (1.13)	267.2 (10.54)
Source: Environment and Climate Change Canada

== Television and film ==
Projects that have been filmed in the area include

- Gold Trails and Ghost Towns, Season 3, Episode 9 (1988).
- Sky High (1989 Disney film).
- Cadence (1990).^{x}
- Bird on a Wire (1990).
- The X-Files (1993 TV series).^{x}
- Double Cross (1994).
- Zacharia Farted (1998).
- Eyes of a Cowboy (1998 TV mini-series).
- The Pick-up (1999 short film).
- By Dawn's Early Light (2001 TV movie).^{x}
- Lola (2001).
- Flower & Garnet (2002).
- Traffic (2004 mini-series).
- The Sisterhood of the Traveling Pants (2005).^{x}
- An Unfinished Life.
- Miss Texas (2005 TV movie).^{x}
- Partition (2007).
- Afghan Knights (2007).
- Centigrade (2007 short film).
- Shooter (2007).^{x}
- Joyride 2: Dead Ahead (2008).
- The Andromeda Strain (2008 mini-series).
- 2012 (2009).
- Alien Trespass (2009).
- Rain Down (2010).
- Thirst (2010).
- The A-Team (2010).^{x}
- Flicka 2 (2010).
- Afghan Luke (2011).^{x}
- King David (2012 TV mini-series).
- The Walk (2013 short film).
- The X-Files (2016 TV Series), Episode: "My Struggle".
- Monster Trucks (2016).
- Tomato Red (2017).
- Juggernaut (2017).
- A Dog's Way Home (2019).
- Red Snow (2019).
- The Twilight Zone (2020).
- The Stand (2020).
- Bullet Proof (a.k.a. Death Pursuit) (2022).

^x. Filmed nearby
