= 400-series highways (British Columbia) =

Former series of highways in British Columbia

- Highway markers for Highway 401 and Highway 499

System information
- Maintained by B.C. Department of Highways
- Length: 517 km (321 mi)
- Formed: 1964
- Notes: Decommissioned in 1973.

Highway names
- Provincial: British Columbia Highway 4XX

System links
- British Columbia provincial highways

The 400-series highways were a pair of controlled-access highways located in the southwestern portion of the Canadian province of British Columbia, forming a special subset of the provincial highway system. Modelled after the 400-Series Highways in Ontario, 400-series designations were introduced in 1964 in conjunction with the completion of the Trans-Canada Highway freeway between Vancouver and Clearbrook (present-day Abbotsford); however, unlike their Ontario counterparts, both routes had signalized sections. The system remained limited to just these two freeways. In 1973, Highway 401 was renumbered as Highway 1 and Highway 499 became Highway 99, while the previous alignments were redesignated with an 'A' suffix.

== Highway 401 ==
- Highway 401
- Length: 122 km (76 mi)
- Existed: 1964–1973
- West end: Highway 1 (TCH) / Highway 99 in West Vancouver
- Major junctions: Highway 7A in Vancouver; Highway 7 in Coquitlam; Highway 15 in Surrey; Highway 10 in Langley; Highway 11 in Abbotsford
- East end: Highway 1 (TCH) / Highway 9 near Rosedale

Highway 1 originally followed portions of Old Yale Road and Fraser Highway from Rosedale to Highway 99 (King George Highway) in Surrey, where the two routes shared a common alignment across the Pattullo Bridge and followed a series of streets including Kingsway and Main Street into downtown Vancouver. In 1959, Highway 1 was extended to Horseshoe Bay via the Lions Gate Bridge and Taylor Way in West Vancouver.

Major freeway construction commenced in the late 1950s, with the Second Narrows Bridge over Burrard Inlet opening in 1960 in conjunction with Upper Levels Highway opening through North Vancouver; however, it was an expressway had a mix of interchanges and signalized intersections. In 1962, Highway 1 was re-routed to a new expressway. The original Port Mann Bridge opened in 1964 in conjunction with a new highway between Vancouver and Clearbrook and was designated as Highway 401; the Clearbrook-Rosedale section of Highway 1 was restored to its original alignment and the expressway became part of Highway 401.

The Trans-Canada Highway was designated along the newly constructed Highway 401, while Highway 1 between Rosedale and West Vancouver was signed as British Columbia Highway 1 and had a regular provincial highway shield. Highway 401 was a freeway for the majority of its length with exception of some traffic signals along the Upper Levels Highway and small section in Vancouver where it followed Cassiar Street (the sections were replaced by interchanges in the 1990s). Highway 401 was renumbered to Highway 1 in 1973, with former sections of Highway 1 becoming Highway 1A.

== Highway 499 ==
- Highway 99B
- Length: 30 km (19 mi)
- Existed: 1959–1962
- South end: Highway 10 in Delta
- North end: Highway 1 (TCH) / Highway 99 in Vancouver

- Highway 499
- Length: 49 km (30 mi)
- Existed: 1964–1973
- South end: I-5 at Canada–U.S. border
- Major junctions: Highway 99 in Surrey; Highway 10 in Delta; Highway 17 in Delta
- North end: Highway 1 (TCH) / Highway 99 in Vancouver

Highway 99 originally followed the King George Highway from the U.S. border to Highway 1 (Fraser Highway) in Surrey, where the two routes shared a common alignment across the Pattullo Bridge and followed before following a series of streets including Kingsway and Main Street into downtown Vancouver. The 1950s saw a series of Highway improvements connecting Vancouver and Richmond, with the completion of the Oak Street Bridge was built in 1957 across the North Arm Fraser River, and the completion of the Deas Island Tunnel in 1959 across the Fraser River (renamed the George Massey Tunnel in 1967). As part of the project, an expressway was constructed connecting the Deas Island Tunnel to Highway 10 – the route connecting downtown Vancouver to Highway 10 was designated as Highway 99B.

In 1962, the freeway was extended to 8th Avenue in Surrey and the route (including Highway 99B) was re-designated as Highway 99. In 1964, Highway 99 was moved back to its former alignment and the freeway was designated as Highway 499, which also followed Oak Street and Granville Street into downtown Vancouver where it linked with Highway 1 and Highway 99. Highway 499 was renumbered to Highway 99 in 1973, with former sections of Highway 99 becoming Highway 99A.

== See also ==
- 400-series highways (Ontario)
- Autoroutes of Quebec
