= King George Boulevard =

Street in Surrey, British Columbia, Canada

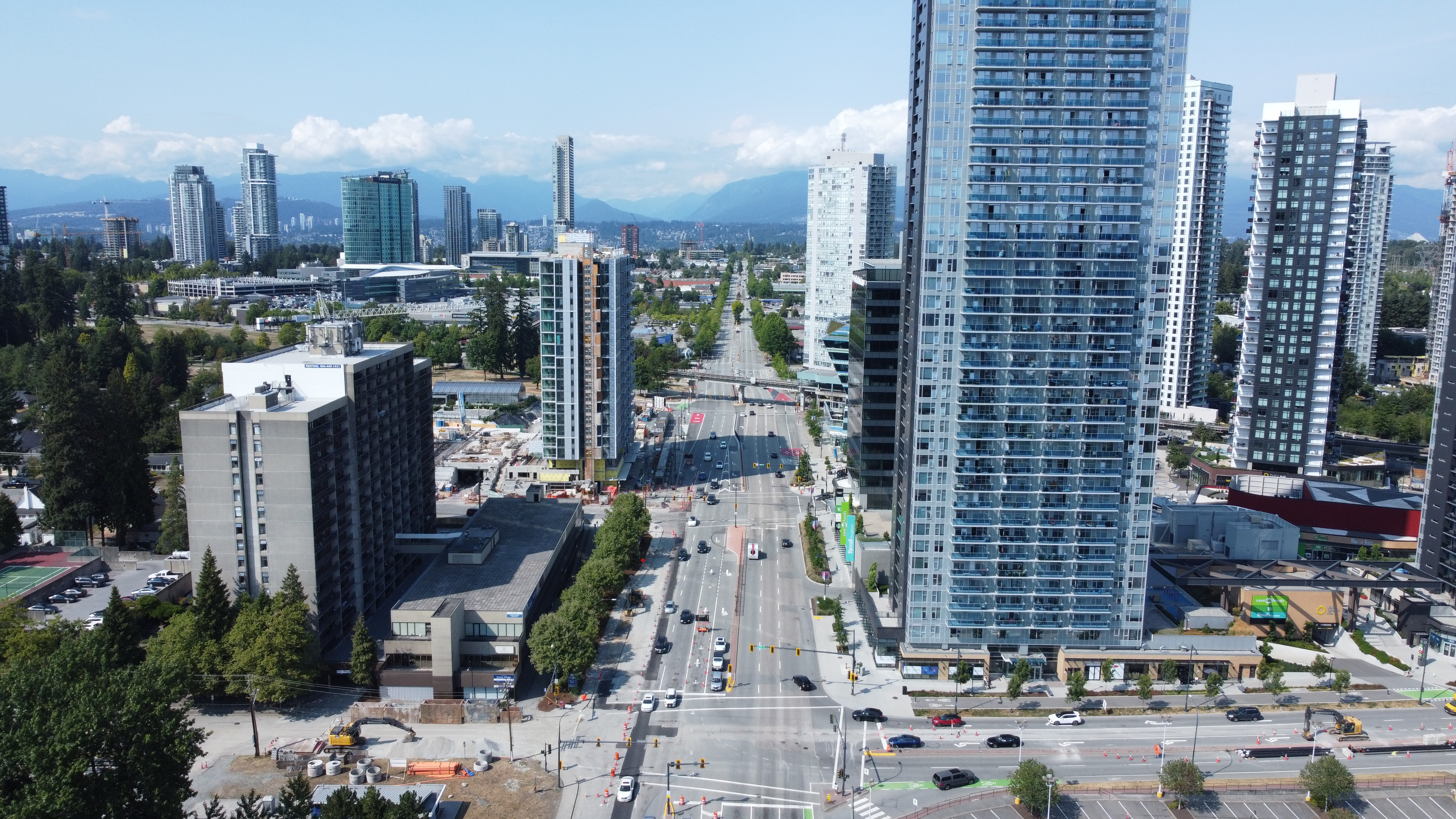
- Aerial view looking north above King George Boulevard at Fraser Highway
- Former name: King George Highway
- Part of: Highway 1A / Highway 99A (former)
- Maintained by: TransLink
- Length: 26 km (16 mi)
- Location: Surrey, British Columbia
- South end: 8th Avenue
- Major junctions: Highway 99; Highway 10; Fraser Highway
- North end: stal̕əw̓asəm Bridge

McBride Boulevard
- Part of: Highway 1A / Highway 99A (former)
- Maintained by: TransLink
- Length: 2.2 km (1.4 mi)
- Location: New Westminster
- Southeast end: stal̕əw̓asəm Bridge
- Northwest end: 10th Avenue

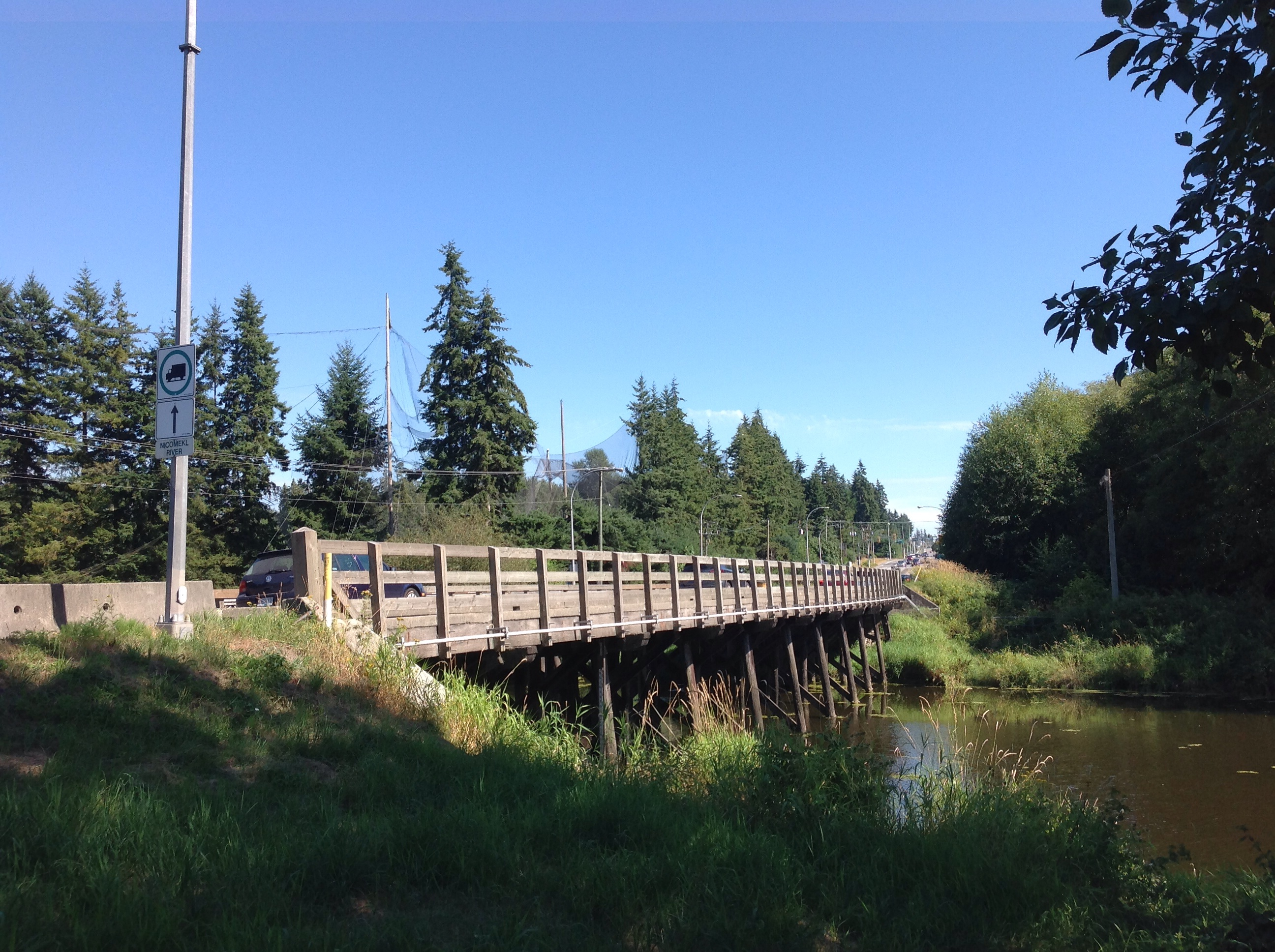
Wooden bridge crossing Nicomekl River in South Surrey

King George Boulevard (formerly known as King George Highway) is a major arterial road in Surrey, British Columbia, Canada. The 26-kilometre (16 mi) route begins at Highway 99, 1.6 kilometres (1.0 mi) north of the Peace Arch Border Crossing with the United States, and runs generally northwest to the south end of the stal̕əw̓asəm Bridge, a crossing of the Fraser River that connects Surrey with New Westminster, becoming McBride Boulevard. The majority of the route varies from four to six lanes, and some sections in the north run parallel to the Expo Line, which has two adjacent SkyTrain stations: Scott Road station in South Westminster, and King George station in the Surrey City Centre district.

== History ==
Prior to completion of the Pattullo Bridge in 1937 and King George Highway in 1940, the main route from Vancouver and New Westminster to both the U.S. border and Fraser Valley was to take the New Westminster Bridge (also known as the Fraser River Swing Bridge) and Old Yale Road from New Westminster to Cloverdale, where travellers could either continue east along the Southern Trans Provincial Highway (present-day Fraser Highway) or south along the Pacific Highway. With the completion of the Pattullo Bridge in 1937 and the King George Highway in 1940, motorists were provided with a more efficient route between Vancouver and New Westminster and the U.S. border. Opened in 1940, the route was originally named "King George Highway" in honour of the royal visit of King George VI the previous year. The corridor was designated Highway 99 and also carried Highway 1 north of present-day Fraser Highway, both of which continued northwest over the Pattullo Bridge and into Vancouver.

In 1973, the Highway 1 and 99 designations were moved to Highway 401 and 499 respectively, with their former alignments being renumbered Highway 1A and Highway 99A. Highway 1A and 99A were decommissioned in 2006 and the name was changed to "King George Boulevard" in 2009 "to project an image of a modern, safe, walkable and livable City Centre community", given that portions of the corridor have had a reputation for being dangerous and having a high incidence of criminal activity.

The Pattullo Bridge was replaced by stal̕əw̓asəm Bridge, which opened on February 14, 2026.

== Route description ==
King George Boulevard begins at the Highway 99 / 8 Avenue interchange in South Surrey, just east of the City of White Rock and assumes a north-westward orientation, running adjacent to the larger highway and through the more urban neighbourhood of Sunnyside. It crosses over Highway 99 and passes through the more suburban and rural Panorama Ridge neighbourhood, before crossing Highway 10 and passing through the populous town centres of Newton and Whalley, including the Surrey City Centre, a neighbourhood within Whalley which is Surrey's commercial core and emerging regional downtown. Just north of Fraser Highway, King George Boulevard passes King George station, the eastern terminus of the SkyTrain's Expo Line. The SkyTrain runs parallel to King George Boulevard, passing Central City shopping mall and other commercial developments before turning west. It passes between the low-lying South Westminster and Bridgeview neighbourhoods, as well as Scott Road station, before ending at the south end of the Pattullo Bridge. The roadway enters New Westminster and becomes McBride Boulevard, ending at 10th Avenue at the New Westminster / Burnaby city boundary.

== Major intersections ==
The entire route is in Metro Vancouver Regional District.

Location	km	mi	Destinations	Notes
Surrey	0.0	0.0	Highway 99 / 8th Avenue (Highway 901:3188 east) – Vancouver, US border, White Rock	Highway 99 exit 2
Surrey	2.0	1.2	North Bluff Road / 16th Avenue	
Surrey	5.0	3.1	152nd Street	
Surrey	6.0	3.7	148th Street / 32nd Avenue (Diversion)	
Surrey	7.2	4.5	Crescent Beach Road	Access to Crescent Beach
Surrey	8.0	5.0	Highway 99 – Vancouver, US border	Highway 99 exit 10; no access from northbound King George Blvd to southbound Highway 99
Surrey	10.2	6.3	Colebrook Road	Grade separated
Surrey	12.0– 12.2	7.5– 7.6	Highway 10 (56th Avenue / 58th Avenue) – Delta, Langley, Hope	Split intersection
Surrey	13.9	8.6	64th Avenue	
Surrey	15.6	9.7	72nd Avenue	
Surrey	18.8	11.7	88th Avenue	
Surrey	20.4	12.7	96th Avenue	
Surrey	20.8	12.9	98th Avenue / Fraser Highway	Former Highway 1A east; south end of former Highway 1A concurrency; near King George Hub
Surrey	22.2	13.8	Old Yale Road / 100th Avenue	Near King George station and Central City
Surrey	22.1	13.7	104th Avenue	Near Surrey Central station
Surrey	24.9	15.5	Bridgeview Drive to Highway 17 / Highway 1 (TCH) east / 128 Street	
Surrey	25.9	16.1	Scott Road	Interchange; near Scott Road station
Fraser River	26.0– 27.2	16.2– 16.9	stal̕əw̓asəm Bridge King George Boulevard north end • McBride Boulevard south end	
New Westminster	27.5	17.1	Royal Avenue / Columbia Street	Interchange
New Westminster	29.4	18.3	10th Avenue – Burnaby, Vancouver	Former Highway 1A / Highway 99A followed 10th Avenue to Kingsway
1.000 mi = 1.609 km; 1.000 km = 0.621 mi: Incomplete access; Route transition

== See also ==
- Royal eponyms in Canada
