= British Columbia Highway 99A =

Highway in British Columbia, Canada

Highway 99A

Route information
- Auxiliary route of Highway 99
- Maintained by the Ministry of Transportation and Infrastructure

Location
- Country: Canada
- Province: British Columbia

Highway system
- British Columbia provincial highways
| ← Highway 99 | → Highway 101 |

Highway 99A is a series of former highways in the southwestern part of British Columbia, Canada. It was the designation of the former 1942 alignment of Highway 99 as well a various alternate routes which existed in the 1950s and 1960s. The last official use of '99A' was decommissioned in 2006, although some present-day, commercially published road maps (such as Google Maps) still show it and some remnant signage still remains. Some brand new 99A signs can be seen as well as of 2023.

== King George Highway / Kingsway ==
Highway 99A
- Location: Surrey, New Westminster, Burnaby, Vancouver
- Length: 48 km (30 mi)
- Existed: 1973–2006

Highway 99A was 48 km (30 mi) long highway within Greater Vancouver and followed the original Highway 99 alignment between the Peace Arch Border Crossing and Downtown Vancouver and was designated in 1973 when the Deas (Island) Throughway was renamed Highway 99. Prior to that, the four-lane, divided "Deas (Island) Throughway" which was completed to the U.S. border in 1962, was designated Highway 499. Highway 99A was decommissioned by the province in 2006 and the city of Surrey renamed "King George Highway" to "King George Boulevard" in 2009, although, as of July 2021, the Ministry of Transportation keeps two minor segments of the former route maintained in its inventory.

=== Route description ===
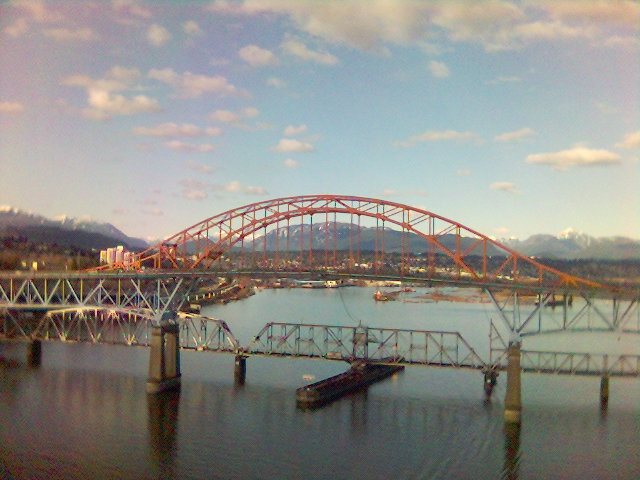
Pattullo Bridge, seen from the SkyBridge.

Highway 99A started in Surrey at the first exit off Highway 99 north of the Peace Arch and followed the King George Highway. Originally to be named the Peace Arch Highway, it was dedicated officially on October 16, 1940 as the King George VI Highway after the royal visit of 1939. The highway served as a route for commuters travelling to New Westminster, Burnaby, and Vancouver. The highway goes north for 8 km (5 mi) to an interchange with Highway 99, and from there, another 4 km (2.5 mi) to its junction with Highway 10. The highway continued north for another 9 km (5.6 mi) to Fraser Highway, where it merged with Highway 1A. Highways 1A and 99A continued northwest for 6 km (3.7 mi) to the Pattullo Bridge over the Fraser River, crossing from Surrey into New Westminster.

In New Westminster, Highway 99A followed McBride Boulevard and 10th Avenue, then onto Kingsway, where the highway entered Burnaby. Highway 99A then proceeded west-northwest for 6 km (3.7 mi) through the City of Burnaby to its intersection with Boundary Road, at which point the highway crossed into Vancouver. In Vancouver, Highway 99A continued on Kingsway northwest for 7 km (4.3 mi), then onto Main Street. Highway 99A followed Main Street north for 2 km (1.2 mi), then west onto the Dunsmuir Viaduct and Dunsmuir Street into the downtown core of the city to Burrard Street, where it reunited with Highway 99 on Georgia Street; southbound traffic followed Georgia Street to Main Street.

=== Major intersections ===
The entire route was in Metro Vancouver Regional District.

| Location | km | mi | Destinations | Notes |
|---|---|---|---|---|
| Surrey | 0.0 | 0.0 | Highway 99 – Vancouver, U.S.A. Border (Peace Arch Border Crossing); 8 Avenue (Highway 901:3188 east) – White Rock, U.S.A. Border (Pacific Highway Border Crossing) | Former Highway 99A southern terminus; Highway 99 exit 2; south end of King George Boulevard; segment between 8 Avenue and northbound entrance from Highway 99 is still provincially maintained. |
| Surrey | 8.0 | 5.0 | Highway 99 – Vancouver, U.S.A. Border | Highway 99 exit 10; no access from northbound King George Boulevard to southbound Highway 99; segment from 121 m (397 ft) north of Crescent Road, across Nicomekl River Bridge to 40 Avenue is still provincially maintained. |
| Surrey | 10.2 | 6.3 | Colebrook Road | Grade separated |
| Surrey | 12.0– 12.2 | 7.5– 7.6 | Highway 10 (56 Avenu, 58 Avenue) – Delta, Langley, Hope | Split intersection |
| Surrey | 20.8 | 12.9 | Fraser Highway | Former Highway 1A east; south end of former Highway 1A concurrency |
| Surrey | 25.9 | 16.1 | Scott Road | Grade separated |
| Fraser River | 26.0– 27.2 | 16.2– 16.9 | stal̕əw̓asəm Bridge North end of King George Boulevard • South end of McBride Boulevard | |
| New Westminster | 27.5 | 17.1 | Royal Avenue / Columbia Street | Grade separated |
| New Westminster–Burnaby boundary | 29.4 | 18.3 | 10th Avenue | Former Highway 1A / Highway 99A follows 10th Avenue |
| New Westminster–Burnaby boundary | 30.8 | 19.1 | 8th Street / Canada Way | Former Douglas Road / Grandview Highway |
| New Westminster–Burnaby boundary | 31.4 | 19.5 | 12th Street / Kingsway | Former Highway 1A / Highway 99A follows Kingsway |
| Burnaby | No major junctions | | | |
| Vancouver | 44.9– 45.1 | 27.9– 28.0 | Broadway (Highway 7) / Main Street | Former Highway 1A / Highway 99A follows Main Street |
| Vancouver | 46.5 | 28.9 | Dunsmuir Street | Former Highway 1A west / Highway 99A north followed Dunsmuir Street; former Highway 1A east / Highway 99A south followed Georgia Street |
| Vancouver | 46.5– 47.4 | 28.9– 29.5 | Georgia and Dunsmuir Viaduct | |
| Vancouver | 47.9– 48.1 | 29.8– 29.9 | Howe Street, Seymour Street (Highway 99 south) – Airport (YVR), U.S. Border, Seattle Georgia Street (Highway 99 north) – West Vancouver, Horseshoe Bay, Whistler | One-way pair; former Highway 99A northern terminus; former Highway 1A west continued along Georgia Street concurrent with Highway 99 |
1.000 mi = 1.609 km; 1.000 km = 0.621 mi: Concurrency terminus; Incomplete access

== Pacific Highway ==
Highway 99A
- Location: Surrey
- Length: 25 km (16 mi)
- Existed: 1942–1958

Between 1942 and 1962, the King George Highway was designated Highway 99, while the Highway 99A designation was given to the older Pacific Highway after it became the alternate U.S. border route. The highway began at the Pacific Highway Border Crossing near the locality of Douglas (now part of Surrey) and continued north to Cloverdale, where it shared the alignment with the Highway 1 (present-day Fraser Highway) to the King George Highway (Highway 99). In 1958, the Pacific Highway was redesignated as Highway 15.

== Grandview Highway ==
Highway 99A
- Location: New Westminster, Burnaby, Vancouver
- Length: 15 km (9.3 mi)
- Existed: 1942–1962

Between 1942 and 1962, the Grandview Highway was designated as Highway 99A, serving as an alternate route to Kingsway between Pattullo Bridge and Vancouver. From the bridge in New Westminster, Highway 99A followed McBride Boulevard and 8th Avenue to 8th Street (at the time, Highway 1/99 followed Columbia Street and 12th Street though downtown New Westminster to Kingsway). After crossing 10th Avenue, Highway 99A entered into Burnaby and become Grandview Highway (sometimes referred to as the Douglas-Grandview Highway as it was known as Douglas Road prior to 1926). At Boundary Road, Grandview Highway turned north for a few blocks before turning west and entering Vancouver, where it travelled in a west-northwest direction along Grandview Highway North to Clark Drive, where Highway 99A followed Clark Drive to the Grandview Viaduct and Terminal Avenue, rejoining Highway 1/99 at Main Street near the Pacific Central Station.

Highway 401 was constructed to the north of Grandview Highway and opened in 1964, replacing Highway 99A as a regional east-west highway, and the route was reverted to the respective local municipalities. In 1968, the Douglas-Grandview Highway was renamed Canada Way in honour of the Canadian Centennial which was a year earlier. Vancouver also later prioritized Grandview Highway to follow Grandview Highway South and connect with 12th Avenue, while Grandview Highway North experienced a series of traffic calming measures, which includes carrying a portion of the SkyTrain's Expo Line and later conversion to a greenway and bikeway.
