= List of British Columbia provincial highways =

British Columbia provincial highway system
- Standard highway markers for British Columbia

Highway names
- Provincial Highways: British Columbia Highway XX (Hwy XX)

System links
- British Columbia provincial highways

The Canadian province of British Columbia has a system of numbered highways that travel between various cities and regions with onward connections to neighboring provinces and U.S. states. The numbering scheme, announced in March 1940, includes route numbers that reflect United States Numbered Highways that continue south of the Canada–United States border. Highway 1 is numbered in accordance with other routes on the Trans-Canada Highway system.

== Major routes ==
=== East–west ===
- The Trans-Canada Highway (Highway 1) runs from Victoria to Nanaimo on Vancouver Island. Then, after a ferry ride to the mainland, it continues from Horseshoe Bay, through the Vancouver area, Abbotsford, Hope, Kamloops, Salmon Arm, and Revelstoke to Kicking Horse Pass on the BC/Alberta border. This is the major east–west route in the province.
- The Crowsnest Highway (Highway 3) runs from Hope, then through Osoyoos, Castlegar, Cranbrook, right to Crowsnest Pass on the BC/Alberta border. This is a southern alternate route to the Trans-Canada, and runs very close to the Canada–US border.
- The Yellowhead/Trans-Canada Highway (Highway 16) starts on Haida Gwaii. After a ferry ride to the mainland, it runs from Prince Rupert through Smithers and Prince George, and then meets the Alberta border at Yellowhead Pass.
- The Lougheed Highway (Highway 7) is a major alternate route that runs from Vancouver to Hope, north of the Fraser River.
- The Okanagan Connector (Highway 97C) is a short but major route that connects the Okanagan Valley to the Coquihalla Highway (Highway 5) at Merritt. 97C branches off Highway 97 at Peachland, about midway between Penticton and Kelowna.

=== North–south ===
- The Island Highway (Highway 19) is an extension of Highway 1 on Vancouver Island. It runs from Nanaimo and provides access to all points northbound on Vancouver Island, including Parksville, Courtenay, Comox, Campbell River, and Port Hardy.
- The Patricia Bay Highway (Highway 17) starts in Victoria and heads northward through Saanich to the Swartz Bay ferry terminal. Recently, there was a gap between the segments of Highway 17 (now filled in with the SFPR), as the Mainland portion was designated as Highway 17A. The new South Fraser Perimeter Road has been named as Highway 17, and presently is open in Delta and Surrey between Highway 17a and Highway 15.
- Highway 99 starts as an extension of Interstate 5 at the Canada–US border in Surrey as a freeway until entering the city of Vancouver. There it becomes a series of various heavily signalized major city core thoroughfares, notably Granville Street and Georgia Street. After crossing the Lions Gate Bridge, the highway - now known as the Sea-to-Sky Highway, is a two-to-four lane route that accesses Squamish and Whistler, before veering east and meeting with Highway 97 north of Cache Creek.
- The Coquihalla/Southern Yellowhead Highway (Highway 5) is a freeway that bypasses the slower Fraser Canyon portion of the Trans Canada Highway, connecting the cities of Hope, Merritt, and Kamloops. The segment between Hope and Merritt was a toll highway until 2008. North of Kamloops, the route is known as the Southern Yellowhead Highway, and meets up with the main route of the Yellowhead Highway near the Alberta border.
- Highway 97 is the longest highway in the province. The highway starts at the Canada–US border near Osoyoos. The highway, here known as the Okanagan Highway, passes through the major Okanagan Valley cities of Penticton, West Kelowna, Kelowna, and Vernon, before ending in Kamloops. From Kamloops, it is known as the Cariboo Highway, and passes through Cache Creek, Williams Lake, Quesnel, and ends in Prince George. North from there, it is known as the John Hart Highway, and ends in Dawson Creek. From there, the highway then is known as the famed Alaska Highway, and travels northwest through the province until it reaches the Yukon border.

== Route list ==
List is current as of May 2017, according to the British Columbia Ministry of Transportation. All routes are signed with the standard "BC Primary Highway Marker" shield, except where stated as "Unsigned", signed under a street name, signed with the Trans-Canada, Yellowhead, Crowsnest, or Nisga'a route marker, or cosigned with any combination of the above, in the "Notes" column.

| Route | Length (km) | Length (mi) | Southern or western terminus | Northern or eastern terminus | Local name(s) | Opened | Removed | Notes |
|---|---|---|---|---|---|---|---|---|
| Highway 1 (TCH) | 116 | 72 | Victoria | Departure Bay ferry terminal in Nanaimo | Trans-Canada Highway (Vancouver Island section), Douglas Street, Island Highway, Esplanade, Nicol Street, Terminal Avenue, Stewart Avenue | 1941 | Current | Vancouver Island section; signed with the TCH marker. |
| Highway 1 (TCH) | 993 | 617 | Horseshoe Bay ferry terminal in West Vancouver | Highway 1 (TCH) at Alberta border at Kicking Horse Pass | Trans-Canada Highway (Mainland section), Upper-Levels Highway, "The Number 1", Highway of Heroes, "The Fraser Canyon" | 1941 | Current | Mainland section; signed with the TCH marker. Passes through Greater Vancouver and Kamloops. |
| Highway 1 | 122 | 76 | Nanaimo | Kelsey Bay | Island Highway | 1941 | 1953 | Passed through Courtenay and Campbell River. Section replaced by Highway 19 in 1953. |
| Highway 1A | 17 | 11 | Highway 1 (TCH) in North Cowichan | Highway 1 (TCH) south of Ladysmith | Chemainus Road, Mt. Sicker Road | 1950 | Current | Route is unsigned. Old alignment of Highway 1 north of Mt. Sicker Road. |
| Highway 1A | 16 | 10 | Highway 1 in Victoria | Highway 1 near Langford | Gorge Road, Admirals Road, Old Island Highway, Goldstream Avenue | 1956 | c. 1990s | Former Highway 1 in Victoria |
| Highway 1A | 16 | 10 | Former Highway 1 in Parksville | Port Alberni | Alberni Highway | 1942 | 1953 | Replaced by Highway 4. |
| Highway 1A | 4 | 2 | Highway 1 in West Vancouver | Highway 99 in Vancouver | Taylor Way, Marine Drive, Stanley Park Causeway, Georgia Street | 1972 | 2016 | Old alignment of Highway 1 through West Vancouver, Stanley Park, and Downtown Vancouver via Lions Gate Bridge. |
| Highway 1A | 28 | 17 | Highway 99 in Vancouver | Highway 1 in Abbotsford | Kingsway, 10th Avenue, McBride Boulevard, King George Boulevard, Fraser Highway | 1972 | Current | Old alignment of Highway 1 through Downtown Vancouver, Burnaby, Surrey (via Pattullo Bridge), and Abbotsford. |
| Highway 1A | 18 | 11 | Highway 1 in Chilliwack | Highway 9 near Popkum | Vedder Road, Old Yale Road | 1972 | c. 1990s | Old alignment of Highway 1 through Chilliwack. |
| Highway 1B | 94 | 58 | Highway 95 in Radium Hot Springs | Alberta border at Vermilion Pass | Banff–Windermere Parkway | 1941 | 1959 | Replaced by Highway 93 |
| Highway 1C | 18 | 11 | Hwy 1A in New Westminster | Main Street, Vancouver | Canada Way, Grandview Highway, Grandview-Douglas Highway | — | 1968 | Alternate route to Hwy 1. Disestablished and renamed Canada Way after Highway 401 was completed. Sections of Grandview Highway were dismantled to make way for the First Ave - Hwy 1 connector. |
| Highway 2 | 42 | 26 | Highway 97 in Dawson Creek | Highway 43 at Alberta border near Tupper | Alaska Avenue, 8 Street, Dawson Creek–Tupper Highway, 50th Street, 50th Avenue | 1941 | Current | — |
| Highway 2 | 845 | 525 | Highway 1 in Cache Creek | Dawson Creek | Cariboo Highway, John Hart Highway | 1941 | 1962 | Passed through Prince George. Cosigned with Highway 97 from 1953 to 1962 before the Highway 2 was removed. |
| Highway 3 | 838 | 521 | Highway 1 (TCH) near Hope | Highway 3 at Alberta border at Crowsnest Pass | Crowsnest Highway, Hope–Princeton Highway | 1941 | Current | Signed with the "Crowsnest" marker. |
| Highway 3 | 108 | 67 | Cascade City | Castlegar | Southern Interprovincial Highway, Santa Rosa Road | 1941 | c. 1962 | Cascade City – Rossland section decommissioned; Rossland – Castlegar section replaced by Highway 22. |
| Highway 3A | 32 | 20 | Highway 3 in Keremeos | Highway 97 near Kaleden | — | 1965 | Current | Old alignment of Highway 3; 34 km (21 mi) concurrency with Highway 97 between Kaleden and Osoyoos was dropped in the 2000s. |
| Highway 3A | 154 | 96 | Highway 3 in Castlegar | Highway 3 in Creston | Vernon Street, Ward Street, Front Street, Anderson Street, Nelson Avenue | 1964 | Current | Old alignment of Highway 3; passes through Nelson and Kootenay Lake Ferry. |
| Highway 3A | 81 | 50 | Former Highway 3 in Trail | Highway 6 / former Highway 3 in Nelson | — | c. 1953 | c. 1964 | Cosigned with Highway 6 between Salmo and Nelson; replaced by sections of Highway 3B and Highway 3. |
| Highway 3A | 46 | 29 | Highway 3 in Keremeos | Highway 97 in Osoyoos | Richter Pass Highway | 1965 | c. 1967 | Replaced by rerouting of Highway 3 |
| Highway 3B | 68 | 42 | Highway 3 near Nancy Greene Provincial Park | Highway 3 near Erie | Victoria Street, Bailey Street, 10th Avenue, Kootenay Avenue, Main Street | 1967 | Current | Old alignment of Highway 3 and Highway 3A; passes through Rossland and Trail. |
| Highway 4 | 162 | 101 | Tofino | Highway 19 near Qualicum Beach | First Street, Campbell Street, Pacific Rim Highway, River Road, Johnston Road, Alberni Highway, Surf Highway | 1953 | Current | Passes through Port Alberni. |
| Highway 4 | 263 | 163 | Highway 3 in Cranbrook | Highway 1 in Golden | — | 1941 | c. 1952 | Replaced by Highway 95. |
| Highway 4A | 10 | 6 | Highway 4 near Coombs | Highway 19 near Parksville | Old Alberni Highway | 1996 | Current | Old alignment of Highway 4. |
| Highway 4A | 6 | 4 | Highway 4 near Coombs | Highway 19 in Qualicum Beach | — | 1968 | 1996 | Replaced by Highway 4. |
| Highway 5 | 543 | 337 | Highway 1 (TCH) near Hope | Highway 16 (TCH) near Tête Jaune Cache | Southern Yellowhead Highway, Coquihalla Highway (Kamloops–Hope) | 1953 | Current | Passes through Merritt and Kamloops; signed with the "Yellowhead" marker. |
| Highway 5 | 184 | 114 | Highway 3 (now Highway 3A) at Kaleden | Highway 1 near Salmon Arm | — | 1941 | 1953 | Replaced by Highway 97 and Highway 97A. |
| Highway 5A | 182 | 113 | Highway 3 in Princeton | Highway 1 (TCH) / Highway 5 / Highway 97 in Kamloops | Tapton Avenue, Princeton-Kamloops Highway, Okanagan Connector, Nicola Avenue, Voght Street | 1986 | Current | Old alignment of Highway 5. |
| Highway 6 | 406 | 252 | SR 31 at U.S. border near Nelway | Highway 97 in Vernon | Nelson Nelway Highway, Railway Avenue, Ymir Road, Lake Avenue, Union Street, Kootenay Street, 6th Avenue, Broadway Street, Vernon Street, 25 Avenue | 1941 | Current | — |
| Highway 6 | 81 | 50 | Highway 5 (now Highway 97) near Vernon | Highway 1 at Monte Creek | — | 1941 | 1953 | Passed through Falkland; replaced by Highway 97. |
| Highway 7 | 150 | 93 | Highway 99 in Vancouver | Highway 1 (TCH) near Hope | Broadway, Lougheed Highway, Haney Bypass, Railway Avenue/1st Avenue | 1941 | Current | — |
| Highway 7A | 26 | 16 | Highway 99 near Vancouver | Highway 7 in Coquitlam | West Pender Street, Burrard Street, Hastings Street, Inlet Drive, Saint Johns Street, Barnet Highway/Barnet Road | 1953 | 1999 | Old alignment of Highway 7. |
| Highway 7B | 7 | 4 | Highway 1 (TCH) / Highway 7 in Coquitlam | Highway 7 in Coquitlam | Mary Hill Bypass | 1996 | Current | — |
| Highway 8 | 69 | 43 | Highway 1 (TCH) in Spences Bridge | Highway 5 / Highway 5A / Highway 97C in Merritt | Nicola Highway | 1953 | Current | — |
| Highway 9 | 16 | 10 | Highway 1 (TCH) at Bridal Falls | Harrison Hot Springs | Agassiz–Rosedale Highway, Hot Springs Road | 1953 | Current | Old alignment of Highway 7 north of Agassiz |
| Highway 10 | 27 | 17 | Highway 91 in Delta | Highway 1 (TCH) in Langley | 58 Ave, 56 Ave, Langley Bypass, Glover Road, Springbrook Road | 1953 | Current | 12 km (7 mi) section between Highway 91 and Highway 17A decommissioned in 2003. |
| Highway 11 | 17 | 11 | SR 9 at U.S. border in Abbotsford | Highway 7 in Mission | Abbotsford–Mission Highway, Sumas Way | 1958 | Current | — |
| Highway 12 | 150 | 93 | Highway 1 (TCH) in Lytton | Highway 99 in Lillooet | Lytton–Lillooet Highway | 1953 | Current | 75 km (47 mi) section between Lillooet and Highway 97 became part Highway 99 in 1992. |
| Highway 13 | 12 | 7 | SR 539 at U.S. border in Langley | Highway 1 (TCH) in Langley | 264th Street | 1958 | Current | — |
| Highway 14 | 103 | 64 | Highway 1 (TCH) in Langford | Port Renfrew | Veterans Memorial Parkway, Sooke Road, Juan de Fuca Highway, West Coast Road | 1953 | Current | — |
| Highway 15 | 20 | 12 | SR 543 at U.S. border in Surrey | Highway 1 (TCH) / Highway 17 in Surrey | Pacific Highway, 176th Street | 1958 | Current | Formerly numbered as Highway 99A |
| Highway 16 (TCH) | 101 | 63 | Masset | Skidegate Ferry Terminal | Yellowhead Highway (Haida Gwaii section), Trans-Canada Highway (Haida Gwaii section) | 1984 | Current | Signed with Trans-Canada and Yellowhead markers. |
| Highway 16 (TCH) | 1,072 | 666 | Prince Rupert ferry terminal | Highway 16 (TCH) at Alberta border at Yellowhead Pass | Yellowhead Highway (Mainland section), Trans-Canada Highway (Mainland section), Highway of Tears | 1953 | Current | Passes through Prince George. Signed with Trans-Canada and Yellowhead markers. |
| Highway 17 | 33 | 21 | Victoria | Swartz Bay ferry terminal | Belleville Street, Blanshard Street/Vernon Avenue, Patricia Bay Highway | 1960 | Current | — |
| Highway 17 | 44 | 27 | Tsawwassen ferry terminal | Highway 1 (TCH) / Highway 15 in Surrey | Tsawwassen Highway, South Fraser Perimeter Road | 1960 | Current | — |
| Highway 17A | 6 | 4 | Highway 17 in Delta | Highway 99 in Delta | Tsawwassen Highway | 2012 | Current | Old alignment of Highway 17. |
| Highway 17A | 5 | 3 | Highway 17 in Saanich | Highway 7 in North Saanich | West Saanich Road, Wain Road | 1962 | 2002 | — |
| Highway 18 | 26 | 16 | Lake Cowichan | Highway 1 (TCH) in Duncan | Cowichan Valley Highway | 1953 | Current | — |
| Highway 19 | 377 | 234 | Duke Point ferry terminal near Nanaimo | Bear Cove ferry terminal near Port Hardy | Duke Point Highway, Nanaimo Parkway, Inland Island Highway, Ginger Goodwin Way, Tamarac Street/Willow Street, Island Highway, Bear Cove Highway | 1953 | Current | — |
| Highway 19A | 12 | 7 | Highway 1 (TCH) in Nanaimo | Highway 19 in Nanaimo | Terminal Avenue, (Old) Island Highway | 1996 | Current | Old alignment of Highway 19 through Nanaimo (business route). |
| Highway 19A | 123 | 76 | Highway 19 near Parksville. | Highway 19 / Highway 28 in Campbell River. | (Old) Island Highway, Oceanside Route, Cliffe Avenue | 1996 | Current | Old alignment of Highway 19. |
| Highway 20 | 457 | 284 | Bella Coola | Highway 97 in Williams Lake | Chilcotin Highway, Alexander MacKenzie Highway | 1953 | Current | — |
| Highway 21 | 14 | 9 | SH-1 at U.S. border at Rykerts | Highway 3 near Creston | Creston–Rykerts Highway | 1964 | Current | — |
| Highway 22 | 46 | 29 | SR 25 at U.S. border at Paterson | Highway 3 near Castlegar | Schofield Highway | 1964 | Current | Old alignment of Highway 3 between Rossland and Castlegar. |
| Highway 22A | 11 | 7 | U.S. border at Waneta | Highway 3B near Montrose | Waneta Highway | 1967 | Current | — |
| Highway 23 | 248 | 154 | Highway 6 near Nakusp | Mica Dam | Canyon Road N, 6 Ave NW | 1964 | Current | Old alignment of Highway 1 north of Revelstoke. |
| Highway 24 | 97 | 60 | Highway 97 near 93 Mile House | Highway 5 at Little Fort | Interlakes Highway | 1967 | Current | — |
| Highway 25 | 59 | 37 | Kitimat | Highway 16 near Terrace | — | 1967 | 1986 | Replaced by Highway 37. |
| Highway 26 | 82 | 51 | Highway 97 in Quesnel | Barkerville | Barkerville Highway, Main Street | 1967 | Current | — |
| Highway 27 | 53 | 33 | Highway 16 (TCH) in Vanderhoof | Fort St. James | Stuart Lake Highway | 1967 | Current | — |
| Highway 28 | 89 | 55 | Gold River | Highway 19 / Highway 19A in Campbell River | Gold River Highway | 1970 | Current | — |
| Highway 29 | 236 | 147 | Highway 52 in Tumbler Ridge | Highway 97 near Charlie Lake | Don Phillips Way | 1967 | Current | — |
| Highway 30 | 30 | 19 | Port Alice | Highway 19 between Port Hardy and Port McNeill | Port Alice Road | — | — | — |
| Highway 31 | 175 | 109 | Highway 3A in Balfour | Highway 23 near Galena Bay | Balfour-Kaslo-Galena Bay Highway | 1973 | Current | — |
| Highway 31A | 47 | 29 | Highway 6 in New Denver | Highway 31 in Kaslo | 6 Avenue, Victoria Street, Washington Street, A Avenue | 1973 | Current | — |
| Highway 33 | 129 | 80 | Highway 3 in Rock Creek | Highway 97 in Kelowna | Kelowna-Rock Creek Highway | 1970 | Current | — |
| Highway 35 | 23 | 14 | Francois Lake | Highway 16 (TCH) at Burns Lake | North Francois Highway | 1973 | Current | — |
| Highway 37 | 879 | 546 | Kitimat | Highway 37 at Yukon border near Upper Liard, YK | Stewart–Cassiar Highway, Stikine Highway, Dease Lake Highway | 1975 | Current | Old alignment of Highway 25 south of Terrace. Ends at the Alaska Highway, 3.2 km (2.0 mi) north of the BC / Yukon border. |
| Highway 37A | 65 | 40 | U.S. Border at Stewart and Hyder, Alaska | Highway 37 at Meziadin Junction | Stewart Highway, Glacier Highway | 1984 | Current | — |
| Highway 39 | 29 | 18 | Highway 97 near of McLeod Lake | Mackenzie | Mackenzie Boulevard | 1975 | Current | — |
| Highway 41 | 1.3 | 0.8 | SR 21 at U.S. border at Carson | Highway 3 near Grand Forks | Danville Highway | 1968 | Current | Shortest officially numbered highway in BC. |
| Highway 43 | 35 | 22 | Highway 3 in Sparwood | Elkford | Elk Valley Highway | 1983 | Current | — |
| Highway 49 | 16 | 10 | Highway 2 in Dawson Creek | Highway 49 at Alberta border near Dawson Creek | Spirit River Highway, Northern Woods and Water Route | 1975 | Current | — |
| Highway 52 | 243 | 151 | Highway 97 at Arras | Highway 2 at Tupper | Heritage Highway | 1988 | Current | — |
| Highway 77 | 138 | 86 | Highway 97 near of Fort Nelson | Highway 7 at NWT border near Fort Liard, NWT | Liard Highway | 1986 | Current | — |
| Highway 91 | 23 | 14 | Highway 99 in Delta | Highway 99 in Richmond | Annacis Highway, Richmond Freeway, East-West Connector | 1986 | Current | Connects with Alex Fraser Bridge. |
| Highway 91A | 3.5 | 2.2 | Highway 91 in Richmond | Marine Way in New Westminster | Queensborough Connector | 1986 | Current | — |
| Highway 93 | 321 | 199 | US 93 at U.S. border at Roosville | Highway 93 at Alberta border at Vermilion Pass | Banff–Windermere Highway, Kootenay Highway | 1958 | Current | — |
| Highway 95 | 329 | 204 | US 95 at U.S. border at Kingsgate | Highway 1 (TCH) in Golden | Kootenay–Columbia Highway | 1957 | Current | — |
| Highway 95A | 55 | 34 | Highway 3 / Highway 95 in Cranbrook | Highway 93 / Highway 95 near Wasa | Kimberley Highway | 1968 | Current | Old alignment of Highway 95 through Kimberley. |
| Highway 97 | 2,081 | 1,293 | US 97 at U.S. border near Osoyoos | Highway 1 at Yukon border near Lower Post | Okanagan Highway, Cariboo Highway, John Hart Highway, Alaska Highway | 1953 | Current | Passes through Kelowna, Kamloops, Prince George, Dawson Creek, and Fort St. John. Most of the highway north of Fort St. John is managed by Public Works Canada. Longest officially numbered highway in BC. |
| Highway 97A | 65 | 40 | Highway 97 near Vernon | Highway 1 (TCH) in Sicamous | Vernon-Sicamous Highway, Young Street | 1962 | Current | — |
| Highway 97A | 47 | 29 | Highway 97 near Vernon | Highway 1 in Salmon Arm | — | 1953 | 1957 | Old alignment of Highway 5, replaced by Highway 97E. |
| Highway 97A | 10 | 6 | Highway 97 near Prince George | Highway 16 near Prince George | Old Cariboo Highway | 1963 | c. 2000s | Old alignment of Highway 97. |
| Highway 97A | 3 | 2 | Highway 16 in downtown Prince George | Highway 97 near Prince George | — | — | c. 1990s | Old alignment of Highway 97. |
| Highway 97B | 14 | 9 | Highway 97A near Grindrod | Highway 1 (TCH) in Salmon Arm | Grindrod-Salmon Arm Highway | 1962 | Current | — |
| Highway 97C | 224 | 139 | Highway 97 near Peachland | Highway 1 (TCH) / Highway 97 in Cache Creek | Okanagan Connector, Coquihalla Connector, Harvey Avenue | 1990 | Current | Passes through Merritt. |
| Highway 97D | 28 | 17 | Highway 97C near Logan Lake | Highway 5 near Lac le Jeune | Meadow Creek Road | 2005 | Current | — |
| Highway 97E | 132 | 82 | Highway 97 / Highway 97W near Vernon | Highway 1 / Highway 97 / Highway 97W at Monte Creek | — | 1957 | 1962 | Passed through Armstrong and Salmon Arm; cosigned with Highway 1 between Salmon Arm and Monte Creek. Old alignment of Highway 5, replaced by Highway 97A and Highway 97B. |
| Highway 97W | 81 | 50 | Highway 97 / Highway 97E near Vernon | Highway 1 / Highway 97 / Highway 97E at Monte Creek | — | 1957 | 1962 | Passed through Falkland; replaced by Highway 97. |
| Highway 99 | 377 | 234 | I-5 at U.S. border at Douglas | Highway 97 near Cache Creek | Vancouver-Blaine Highway, Fraser Delta Thruway, Oak Street, 41st Avenue/70th Avenue, Granville Street, Howe Street/Seymour Street, Georgia Street, Stanley Park Causeway, Lions Gate Bridge Road, Marine Drive, Taylor Way, Upper-Levels Highway, Sea to Sky Highway, Squamish Highway, Whistler Highway, Pemberton Portage Road, Lillooet Lake Road, Duffey Lake Road | 1942 | Current | Passes through Greater Vancouver and Whistler. |
| Highway 99A | 15 | 9 | U.S. border in Surrey | Former Highway 99 (King George Highway) in Surrey | Pacific Highway | 1942 | 1958 | Portion cosigned with Highway 1; replaced by Highway 15. |
| Highway 99A | 18 | 11 | Former Highway 99 (Main Street) in Vancouver | Former Highway 1 / Highway 99 in New Westminster | Grandview Highway | 1942 | 1962 | |
| Highway 99A | 50 | 31 | Highway 99 in Surrey | Highway 99 in Vancouver | King George Highway, Kingsway | 1973 | 2006 | Old alignment of Highway 99. |
| Highway 99B | 30 | 19 | Highway 10 in Delta | Highway 1 / Highway 99 in Vancouver | Deas (Island) Throughway | 1959 | 1962 | Replace by Highway 499 (now Highway 99). |
| Highway 101 | 152 | 94 | Langdale Ferry Terminal | Lund | Sunshine Coast Highway, Pan-American Highway | 1962 | Current | — |
| Highway 113 | 169 | 105 | Highway 16 (TCH) near Terrace | Ging̱olx | Nisga'a Highway | 2006 | Current | Signed with the Nisga'a route marker. |
| Highway 118 | 50 | 31 | Highway 16 (TCH) near Topley | Granisle | Topley Landing Road | 2003 | Current | Route also signed as Topley Landing Road. |
| Highway 395 | 4 | 2 | US 395 at U.S. border at Cascade | Highway 3 near Christina Lake | — | 1973 | Current | — |
| Highway 401 (TCH) | 122 | 76 | Highway 1 / Highway 99 in West Vancouver | Highway 1 / Highway 9 at Bridal Falls | Trans-Canada Highway | 1964 | 1973 | Replaced by Highway 1. |
| Highway 499 | 49 | 30 | Highway 99 in Surrey | Highway 99 in Downtown Vancouver | Deas (Island) Throughway | 1964 | 1973 | Replaced by Highway 99. |
Former Route

== Unnumbered highways ==
The following routes are maintained by the Ministry of Transportation as part of British Columbia's highway system, but they are Currently unnumbered.

=== Unofficial numbers ===
Provincially maintained roads with informal or unofficial numbers:

| Number | Length (km) | Length (mi) | Southern or western terminus | Northern or eastern terminus | Local names | Formed | Removed | Notes |
|---|---|---|---|---|---|---|---|---|
| Highway 40 | 107.45 | 66.77 | Gold Bridge | Highway 99 in Lillooet | • Road 40 • Lillooet-Pioneer Road • Bridge River Road | — | — | Officially known as Highway 907:2935 |
| Highway 51 | 111.74 | 69.43 | Telegraph Creek | Dease Lake; connects to Highway 37 | Telegraph Creek Road | — | — | Officially known as Highway 910:3600 & Highway 910:3601 |
| Highway 59 | 138.44 | 86.02 | Quesnel; connects to Highway 97 | Nazko | • Blackwater Road • Nazko Road | — | — | Officially known as Highway 907:1557 & Highway 907:1559 |
| Highway 62 | 7.45 | 4.63 | Hazelton | Highway 16 in New Hazelton | High Level Road | — | — | |
| Highway 91C | 2.2 | 1.4 | Highway 17 in Delta | Nordel Way at BNSF overpass, in Delta | Highway 91 Connector | — | — | Officially known as Highway 901:3146 & Highway 901:3147 |
| Highway 103 | 63.69 | 39.58 | Fort St. John; connects to Highway 97 | Alberta border; becomes Highway 64 | • Rose Prairie Road • Cecil Lake Road | — | — | Officially known as Highway 908:1173 & Highway 908:1189 |

=== Unnumbered routes ===
Provincially maintained unsigned routes which are unnumbered but internally designated. Route numbers are in the 900-series with the last two digits designating the transportation district, which were revised in 2022. The subsequent four-digit represent the segment derived from the province's Landmark Kilometre Inventory system. Route numbers are as follows:

Highways

| Number | Name |
|---|---|
| Highway 901 | Lower Mainland Unnumbered Route |
| Highway 902 | Vancouver Island Unnumbered Route |
| Highway 903 | Rocky Mountain Unnumbered Route |
| Highway 904 | West Kootenay Unnumbered Route |
| Highway 905 | Okanagan Shuswap Unnumbered Route |
| Highway 906 | Thompson Nicola Unnumbered Route |
| Highway 907 | Cariboo Unnumbered Route |
| Highway 908 | Peace Unnumbered Route |
| Highway 909 | Fort George Unnumbered Route |
| Highway 910 | Bulkley Stikine Unnumbered Route |
| Highway 911 | Skeena Unnumbered Route |

The list of routes and segments, excluding ramps within interchange maintenance areas, are:

| Number | Length (km) | Length (mi) | Southern or western terminus | Northern or eastern terminus | Local names | Formed | Removed | Notes |
|---|---|---|---|---|---|---|---|---|
| Highway 901:0509 | 0.72 | 0.45 | Mountain Highway in North Vancouver | Seymour River Bridge in North Vancouver | Main Street | — | — | Maintenance area around Highway 1 / Main Street interchange. |
| Highway 901:0513 | 1.43 | 0.89 | Highway 1 / Highway 99 / Eagleridge Drive in West Vancouver | Marine Drive#North Shore / Horseshoe Bay Drive (Highway 901:2924) in West Vancouver | Horseshoe Bay Drive (ramp) | — | — | Former Highway 99 alignment. |
| Highway 901:0602 | 2.70 | 1.68 | NW Marine Drive (Highway 901:0620) in the University Endowment Lands | Drummond Drive in Vancouver; continues as West 4th Avenue | Chancellor Boulevard | — | — | |
| Highway 901:0620 | 9.67 | 6.01 | W 41st Avenue in Vancouver | Spanish Banks parking lot in Vancouver | SW/NW Marine Drive | — | — | |
| Highway 901:0640 | 2.45 | 1.52 | SW Marine Drive (Highway 901:0620) in the University Endowment Lands | Blanca Street in Vancouver | W 16th Avenue | — | — | |
| Highway 901:0660 | 2.35 | 1.46 | Wesbrook Mall in the University Endowment Lands | Blanca Street in Vancouver; continues as W 10th Avenue | University Boulevard | — | — | |
| Highway 901:0670 | 2.10 | 1.30 | Highway 11 in Mission | Highway 7 in Mission | Horne Street Connector | — | — | Eastbound only. |
| Highway 901:0671 | 2.00 | 1.24 | Highway 11 in Mission | Highway 7 in Mission | Horne Street Connector | — | — | Westbound only. |
| Highway 901:0691 | 17.65 | 10.97 | Henderson Road in the Columbia Valley | Chilliwack city limits; continues as Cultus Lake Road | Columbia Valley Highway | — | — | Includes section of Cultus Lake Road south of Chilliwack city limits. |
| Highway 901:0694 | 2.55 | 1.58 | Highway 1 in Hope | Highway 3 in Hope | Old Hope-Princeton Way | — | — | Former alignment of Highway 3. |
| Highway 901:2545 | 1.37 | 0.85 | Highway 1 / Hastings Street interchange in Vancouver | | Cassiar Connector | — | — | Southbound ramps (Highway 1 eastbound) over Cassiar Tunnel. |
| Highway 901:2546 | 1.50 | 0.93 | Highway 1 / Hastings Street interchange in Vancouver | | Cassiar Connector | — | — | Northbound ramps (Highway 1 westbound) over Cassiar Tunnel. |
| Highway 901:2560 | 11.61 | 7.21 | Highway 101 / Marine Drive (Highway 901:2563) at Langdale | Port Mellon | Port Mellon Highway | — | — | |
| Highway 901:2563 | 3.74 | 2.32 | Gibsons town boundary | Highway 101 / Port Mellon Highway (Highway 901:2560) at Langdale | Marine Drive | — | — | Former Highway 101 alignment. |
| Highway 901:2574 | 0.74 | 0.46 | Madeira Park | Highway 101 near Madeira Park | Madeira Park Road | — | — | |
| Highway 901:2576 | 0.14 | 0.087 | Powell River ferry terminal | Highway 101 in Powell River | Wharf Street | — | — | |
| Highway 901:2752 | 3.61 | 2.24 | Highway 9 in Agassiz | Highway 7 in Agassiz | Agassiz Bypass | — | — | Connects Highway 9 south with Highway 7 east. |
| Highway 901:2923 | 0.95 | 0.59 | No. 3 Road in Richmond | Highway 99 in Richmond | Sea Island Way | — | — | Connects to Vancouver International Airport. |
| Highway 901:2924 | 2.68 | 1.67 | Marine Drive / Horseshoe Bay Drive (Highway 901:0513) in West Vancouver; connects to Highway 1 | Highway 99 in West Vancouver | Horseshoe Bay Drive | — | — | Former Highway 99 alignment. |
| Highway 901:3144 | 2.36 | 1.47 | Highway 17 / 104th Avenue in Surrey | Golden Ears Way (Highway 916) / 96th Avenue Connector in Surrey | Golden Ears Connector | — | — | |
| Highway 901:3146 | 2.24 | 1.39 | Highway 17 in Delta | Nordel Way BNSF Overpass, east of Highway 91 in Delta | Highway 91 Connector | — | — | Eastbound only. |
| Highway 901:3147 | 2.21 | 1.37 | Highway 17 in Delta | Nordel Way BNSF Overpass, east of Highway 91 in Delta | Highway 91 Connector | — | — | Westbound only. |
| Highway 901:3188 | 1.99 | 1.24 | King George Boulevard / Highway 99 in Surrey | Highway 15 in Surrey | 8th Avenue | — | — | Connects Highway 15 and Highway 99 near the Canada-U.S. border. |
| Highway 901:3191 | 8.08 | 5.02 | Roberts Bank Superport | Highway 17 / Highway 17A in Delta | Deltaport Road | — | — | |
| Highway 902:0313 | 2.51 | 1.56 | Highway 1 in Saanich | Highway 17 in Saanich | McKenzie Avenue | — | — | |
| Highway 902:0320 | 6.83 | 4.24 | Veridier Avenue (to Brentwood Bay ferry terminal) in Central Saanich | McTavish Road (Highway 902:0325) in North Saanich | West Saanich Road | — | — | Former segment of Highway 17A; connects to Brentwood Bay-Mill Bay ferry; ferry connection to Highway 902:2402. |
| Highway 902:0325 | 3.57 | 2.22 | West Saanich Road (Highway 902:0320) in North Saanich | Highway 17 / Lochside Drive (Highway 902:0326) in North Saanich | McTavish Road | — | — | |
| Highway 902:0326 | 2.14 | 1.33 | Highway 17 / McTavish Road (Highway 902:0325) in North Saanich | Anacortes–San Juan Islands ferry terminal in Sidney | Lochside Drive | — | — | |
| Highway 902:0348 | 14.52 | 9.02 | Highway 18 / Skutz Falls Road east of Lake Cowichan | North Cowichan district boundary | Lake Cowichan Road | — | — | Former Highway 18 alignment. |
| Highway 902:0363 | 5.08 | 3.16 | Cowichan Bay Road at Cowichan 1 | Maple Bay Road east of Duncan | Tzouhalem Road | — | — | |
| Highway 902:0365 | 4.19 | 2.60 | Chemainus Road (Highway 1A) in North Cowichan | Salt Spring Island ferry terminal at Crofton (North Cowichan) | Crofton Road | — | — | |
| Highway 902:0377 | 50.68 | 31.49 | South Shore Road (Highway 902:0382 / Highway 902:0383) at Mesachie Lake | Deering Road (Highway 902:0378) north of Port Renfrew | Pacific Marine Road | — | — | |
| Highway 902:0378 | 2.96 | 1.84 | Pacific Marine Road (Highway 902:0377) north of Port Renfrew | Highway 14 at Port Renfrew | Deering Road | — | — | |
| Highway 902:0382 | 6.87 | 4.27 | South Shore Road / Gordon River Road west of Honeymoon Bay | Pacific Marine Road (Highway 902:0377) at Mesachie Lake; continues as Highway 902:0383 | South Shore Road | — | — | |
| Highway 902:0383 | 8.06 | 5.01 | Pacific Marine Road (Highway 902:0377) at Mesachie Lake; continues as Highway 902:0382 | Highway 18 / Youbou Road (Highway 902:0386) at Lake Cowichan | South Shore Road | — | — | Includes Cowichan Lake Road and Cowichan Valley Highway between North Shore Road and Youbou Road. |
| Highway 902:0386 | 15.08 | 9.37 | Youbou | Cowichan Valley Highway (Highway 18 / Highway 902:0383) at Lake Cowichan | Youbou Road | — | — | |
| Highway 902:2331 | 5.75 | 3.57 | Highway 19 in Cumberland | Highway 19A in Courtenay | Comox Valley Parkway | — | — | |
| Highway 902:2336 | 4.39 | 2.73 | Highway 19A at Royston | Cumberland village boundary | Royston Road | — | — | No access to Highway 19. |
| Highway 902:2364 | 4.62 | 2.87 | Highway 19 in Campbell River | Highway 19A in Campbell River | Jubilee Parkway | — | — | |
| Highway 902:2376 | 1.06 | 0.66 | Highway 19 west of Buckley Bay | Highway 19A at Buckley Bay | Buckley Bay Connector | — | — | Connects with Buckley Bay ferry terminal. |
| Highway 902:2377 | 2.94 | 1.83 | Highway 19 south of Port McNeill | Port McNeill ferry terminal | Port McNeill access | — | — | |
| Highway 902:2387 | 12.28 | 7.63 | Highway 19 south of Sayward | Kelsey Bay | Sayward Road | — | — | Former Highway 19 alignment. |
| Highway 902:2388 | 7.98 | 4.96 | Ucluelet | Highway 4 north of Ucluelet | Ucluelet Road | — | — | |
| Highway 902:2391 | 10.52 | 6.54 | Highway 19 east of Port McNeill | Telegraph Cove Road east of Beaver Cove | Beaver Cove Road | — | — | |
| Highway 902:2398 | 5.03 | 3.13 | Highway 19 south of Port Hardy | Port Hardy | Douglas Street | — | — | |
| Highway 902:2401 | 5.22 | 3.24 | Highway 1 / Delourme Road at Mill Bay | Mill Bay Ferry Access Road (Highway 903:2402) | Mill Bay Road | — | — | Former segment of Highway 1. |
| Highway 902:2402 | 0.30 | 0.19 | Mill Bay Road (Highway 903:2401) | Mill Bay ferry terminal | Mill Bay Ferry Access Road | — | — | Connects to Brentwood Bay-Mill Bay ferry; ferry connection to Highway 902:0320. |
| Highway 903:1399 | 24.67 | 15.33 | Highway 43 at Elkford | Fording River Coal Mine | Fording River Road | — | — | |
| Highway 903:1455 | 29.72 | 18.47 | Highway 93 / Highway 95 at Fort Steele | Highway 3 / Highway 93 at Wardner | Wardner–Fort Steele Road | — | — | |
| Highway 903:2143 | 22.55 | 14.01 | Highway 93 / Highway 95 south of Fairmont Hot Springs | Invermere municipal boundary | Westside Road | — | — | |
| Highway 904:1321 | 1.94 | 1.21 | US border at the Ferry–Midway Border Crossing | Highway 3 in Midway | Dominion Road | — | — | |
| Highway 904:1418 | 2.91 | 1.81 | US border at the Nighthawk–Chopaka Border Crossing | Highway 3 at Chopaka | Nighthawk Road | — | — | Connects to Nighthawk, Washington. |
| Highway 905:0944 | 47.28 | 29.38 | Highway 1 at Squilax | Shuswap Lake Marine Provincial Park (St. Ives Site) | Squilax Anglemont Road | — | — | |
| Highway 905:1127 | 22.50 | 13.98 | Highway 97 east of Falkland | Salmon Arm city limits | Salmon River Road | — | — | |
| Highway 905:1280 | 9.26 | 5.75 | Main Street / 7th Avenue (near Highway 97) in Okanagan Falls | Penticton city limits; becomes Lakeside Road | Eastside Road | — | — | |
| Highway 905:1290 | 7.90 | 4.91 | Highway 97 in Lake Country (north of Winfield) | Highway 97 in Lake Country (north of Oyama) | Pelmewash Parkway | — | — | Former Highway 97 alignment. |
| Highway 905:1292 | 65.43 | 40.66 | Highway 97 / Sneena Road in West Kelowna | Highway 97 in Spallumcheen | Westside Road | — | — | |
| Highway 905:1294 | 43.35 | 26.94 | Highway 97 in Falkland | Highway 1 west of Chase | Chase-Falkland Road | — | — | |
| Highway 906:0923 | 16.15 | 10.04 | Meadow Creek Road (Highway 97D) north of Lac le Jeune | Kamloops city limits | Lac le Jeune Road | — | — | |
| Highway 906:1766 | 6.70 | 4.16 | Highway 5 south of Clearwater | Clearwater municipal boundary; connects to Highway 5 | Old North Thompson Highway | — | — | Former Highway 5 alignment. |
| Highway 906:1771 | 2.15 | 1.34 | Halston Bridge / Kamloops city boundary | Highway 5 / Paul Lake Road (Highway 906:1777) in Kamloops 1 | Halston Road | — | — | |
| Highway 906:1776 | 29.11 | 18.09 | Kamloops city boundary; connects to Highway 5 | Sun Peaks | • Heffley-Louis Creek Road • Tod Mountain Road | — | — | |
| Highway 906:1777 | 11.89 | 7.39 | Highway 5 / Halston Road (Highway 906:1771) in Kamloops 1 | Pinantan-Pritchard Road (Highway 906:1778) near Paul Lake Provincial Park | Paul Lake Road | — | — | |
| Highway 906:1778 | 33.40 | 20.75 | Paul Lake Road (Highway 906:1777) near Paul Lake Provincial Park | Highway 1 near Pritchard | Pinantan-Pritchard Road | — | — | |
| Highway 907:0901 | 4.85 | 3.01 | Highway 1 south of Ashcroft | Highway 97C in Ashcroft | Cornwall Road | — | — | |
| Highway 907:1152 | 42.58 | 26.46 | 100 Mile House municipal boundary; connects to Highway 97 | Hawkins Road / Resort Road at Eagle Creek | Canim-Hendrix Lake Road | — | — | |
| Highway 907:1153 | 34.51 | 21.44 | 100 Mile House municipal boundary; connects to Highway 97 | Highway 24 west of Sheridan Lake | Horse Lake Road | — | — | |
| Highway 907:1552 | 82.82 | 51.46 | Highway 97 at 150 Mile House | Quesnel Forks Road / Likely Street in Likely; continues as Keithley Creek Road | Likely Road | — | — | |
| Highway 907:1553 | 46.69 | 29.01 | Likely Road (Highway 907:1552) north of 150 Mile House | Hooker Road / Horsefly-Quesnel Lake Road at Horsefly | Horsefly Road | — | — | |
| Highway 907:1555 | 39.80 | 24.73 | Highway 20 west of Williams Lake | Buckskin Road southwest of Soda Creek; continues as Highway 907:1556 | • Chilcotin-Meldrum Road • West Fraser Road | 2017 | current | |
| Highway 907:1556 | 86.52 | 53.76 | Buckskin Road southwest of Soda Creek; continues as Highway 907:1555 | Quesnel city boundary; continues as Anderson Drive | West Fraser Road | — | — | |
| Highway 907:1557 | 6.68 | 4.15 | Nazko Road (Highway 907:1559) northwest of Quesnel; continues as Highway 907:1558 | Quesnel city limits; continues as North Fraser Drive | Blackwater Road | — | — | Part of unofficial Highway 59. |
| Highway 907:1558 | 130.10 | 80.84 | Highway 16 in Prince George | Nazko Road (Highway 907:1559) northwest of Quesnel; continues as Highway 907:1557 | Blackwater Road | — | — | |
| Highway 907:1559 | 131.84 | 81.92 | Batnini Road northwest of Nazko | Nazko Road (Highway 907:1557 / Highway 907:1558) northwest of Quesnel | Nazko Road | — | — | Part of unofficial Highway 59. |
| Highway 907:2935 | 107.45 | 66.77 | Fergusson Street in Gold Bridge | Highway 99 in Lillooet | • Road 40 • Lillooet-Pioneer Road • Bridge River Road | — | — | Unofficial Highway 40. |
| Highway 908:1106 | 81.57 | 50.69 | Highway 2 east of Dawson Creek | Cecil Lake Road (Highway 908:1189) southeast of Goodlow | • Rolla Road • Clayhurst Road | — | — | |
| Highway 908:1173 | 2.41 | 1.50 | Fort St. John city boundary; becomes 100 Street | Cecil Lake Road (Highway 908:1189) north for Fort St. John; continues as Highway 908:1174 | Rose Prairie Road | — | — | Part of unofficial Highway 103. |
| Highway 908:1174 | 32.85 | 20.41 | Cecil Lake Road (Highway 908:1189) north for Fort St. John; continues as Highway 908:1173 | 264 Road north of Rose Prairie | Rose Prairie Road | — | — | |
| Highway 908:1179 | 19.25 | 11.96 | W. A. C. Bennett Dam | Highway 29 in Hudson's Hope | Canyon Drive | — | — | |
| Highway 908:1189 | 61.32 | 38.10 | Rose Prairie Road (Highway 908:1173 / Highway 908:1174) north of Fort St. John | Alberta border; continues as Highway 64 | Cecil Lake Road | — | — | Part of unofficial Highway 103. |
| Highway 909:1156 | 6.40 | 3.98 | Highway 97 south of Prince George | Prince George city limits; connects to Highway 16 | Old Cariboo Highway | — | — | Former Highway 97A alignment. |
| Highway 909:1562 | 13.00 | 8.08 | Highway 27 north of Vanderhoof | Westwood Road northwest of Vanderhoof | Braeside Road | — | — | |
| Highway 909:1578 | 60.93 | 37.86 | Highway 16 east of Prince George | Hansard | Upper Fraser Road | — | — | |
| Highway 910:1112 | 38.63 | 24.00 | Ootsa-Nadina Road at Ootsa Lake | Southbank Ferry Landing on François Lake; connects to Highway 35 | Keefe's Landing Road | — | — | |
| Highway 910:3600 | 36.74 | 22.83 | Telegraph Creek | Tuya River Bridge; continues as Highway 910:3601 | Telegraph Creek Road | — | — | Unofficial Highway 51. |
| Highway 910:3601 | 75.00 | 46.60 | Tuya River Bridge; continues as Highway 910:3600 | Boulder Street / Dease Lake Avenue in Dease Lake | Telegraph Creek Road | — | — | Unofficial Highway 51. |
| Highway 910:3613 | 50.99 | 31.68 | Discovery Avenue in Atlin | Yukon border; becomes Highway 7 | Atlin Road | — | — | |
| Highway 911:1507 | 14.26 | 8.86 | Alliford Bay ferry terminal | North Beach Road in Sandspit | Alliford Bay Road | — | — | |
| Highway 911:1509 | 13.87 | 8.62 | Port Edward | Highway 16 east of Prince Rupert | Port Edward Road | — | — | |
| Highway 911:1512 | 7.95 | 4.94 | Daajing Giids | Highway 16 near the Skidegate ferry terminal | Oceanview Drive | — | — | |
| Highway 916 | 12.60 | 7.83 | Highway 15 in Surrey | 210th Street in Maple Ridge | Golden Ears Way | — | — | Maintained by Translink |

== Yukon highways in British Columbia ==
The following routes are within British Columbia but are considered part of the Yukon highway system. Although the Alaska Highway crosses the 60th parallel north, and thus the border with the Yukon, nine times (including six crossings between historic miles 588 and 596), the highway route number changes just once, between Lower Post, British Columbia, and Watson Lake, Yukon. The Yukon section east of here is maintained by Public Works Canada as part of the B.C. portion of Highway 97, while the B.C. section west of here is maintained by the Yukon Government as part of Yukon Highway 1.

| Number | Length (km) | Length (mi) | Southern or western terminus | Northern or eastern terminus | Local names | Formed | Removed | Notes |
|---|---|---|---|---|---|---|---|---|
| Hwy 1 | 64.3 | 40.0 | Yukon border west of Swift River, Yukon | Yukon border east of Teslin, Yukon | Alaska Highway | 1943 | current | Maintained by the Yukon Government |
| Hwy 2 | 56.7 | 35.2 | Alaska border at White Pass | Yukon border south of Carcross, Yukon | Klondike Highway | 1978 | current | Maintained by the Yukon Government |
| Hwy 3 | 74.0 | 46.0 | Alaska border north of Haines, Alaska | Yukon border south of Haines Junction, Yukon | Haines Highway | 1943 | current | YT 4 prior to 1978; maintained by the Yukon Government |
| Highway 97 | 12.0 | 7.5 | Cumulative sections BC 97 in the Yukon east of Lower Post, British Columbia | | Alaska Highway | — | — | 6 separate border crossings; maintained by Public Works Canada |

== Defunct route numbers ==
The first two freeways built in British Columbia were given 400-series numbers, much like the 400-Series Highways in Ontario. Highways 401 and 499 were renumbered 1 and 99 respectively in 1973. The section of Highway 37 between Terrace and Kitimat was known as Highway 25 until 1986. In recent years, many routes have been devolved to regional and/or municipal authorities and have lost their official highway status, notably the Fraser Highway in the Lower Mainland (formerly part of Highway 1A) and West Saanich Road on Vancouver Island (formerly Highway 17A). Also King George Highway through Surrey was renamed by the City in 2010 to King George Boulevard. (formerly British Columbia Highway 99A).

== Defunct lettering system ==
Prior to 1940, British Columbia classified its major roads with letters. Ultimately, in 1939 or early 1940, a decision was made by the Department of Public Works (now the British Columbia Ministry of Transportation and Infrastructure) to replace the lettering system with the familiar number system. This transition took place during the 1940/1941 fiscal year and led to the installation of route markers along multiple highways.

| Route | Length (km) | Length (mi) | Southern or western terminus | Northern or eastern terminus | Local name(s) | Notes |
|---|---|---|---|---|---|---|
| A | 1,286 | 799 | Port Alberni Vancouver | Parksville Alberta border at Crowsnest Pass | Southern Trans-Provincial Highway | Vancouver Island and mainland section; split in the Lower Mainland with branches followed the north and south shores of the Fraser River. Replaced by present-day Hwy 4, Hwy 19, Hwy 1, Hwy 7, Hwy 8, Hwy 5A, and Hwy 3. |
| B | 945 | 587 | Bella Coola Cache Creek | Williams Lake Alberta border at Kicking Horse Pass | Central Trans-Provincial Highway | Incomplete section between Bella Coola and Redstone; connected by Route S (present-day Hwy 97). Replaced by present-day Hwy 20, Hwy 1, and Hwy 23. |
| C | 996 | 619 | Prince Rupert | Tête Jaune Cache (incomplete extension to Alberta border at Yellowhead Pass) | Northern Trans-Provincial Highway | Replaced by present-day Hwy 16. |
| N | 348 | 216 | Victoria | Kelsey Bay | Island Highway | Replaced by present-day Hwy 1A, Hwy 1, Hwy 19A, and Hwy 19. |
| R | 51 | 32 | U.S. border at Blaine, Washington | Vancouver | Pacific Highway | Accessed Vancouver via the Pattullo Bridge. Replaced by Hwy 15 and former Hwy 1A. |
| S | 484 | 301 | Spences Bridge | Prince George | Cariboo Highway | Replaced by Hwy 1 and Hwy 97. |
| T | 634 | 394 | U.S. border near Osoyoos | Tête Jaune Cache | • Okanagan Highway • North Thompson Highway | Replaced by present-day Hwy 5 and Hwy 97. |
| U | 427 | 264 | U.S. border at Roosville | Golden Alberta border at Vermilion Pass | • Kootenay–Columbia River Highway • Banff–Windermere Highway | Split at Radium Hot Springs with branches going to Golden and Vermilion Pass. Replaced by present-day Hwy 93 and Hwy 95. |
