= British Columbia Highway 9 =

Highway in British Columbia

Highway 9
- Agassiz-Rosedale Highway, Harrison Hot Springs Road, Haig Highway
- Highway 9 highlighted in red

Route information
- Maintained by the Ministry of Transportation and Infrastructure
- Length: 15.6 km (9.7 mi)
- Existed: 1953–present

Major junctions
- South end: Highway 1 (TCH) near Bridal Falls
- Highway 7 in Agassiz
- North end: Esplande Road in Harrison Hot Springs

Location
- Country: Canada
- Province: British Columbia

Highway system
- British Columbia provincial highways
← Highway 8	→ Highway 10

Highway 9, the Agassiz-Rosedale Highway, is a north-south route in the eastern part of the Fraser Valley. It acts as the last connection between the Trans Canada Highway (Highway 1) and the Lougheed Highway (Highway 7) eastbound before Hope, and is the main access to the resort village of Harrison Hot Springs and the town of Agassiz. The highway first opened in 1953, originally going between Yale Road in Rosedale and Highway 7, with a ferry across the Fraser River. A bridge for Highway 9 across the Fraser opened in 1956. When the section of Highway 1 east of Chilliwack opened in 1961, Highway 9 was extended south to a junction with the new Highway 1 alignment, which replaced Yale Road as the main route between Chilliwack and Hope.

== Route details ==
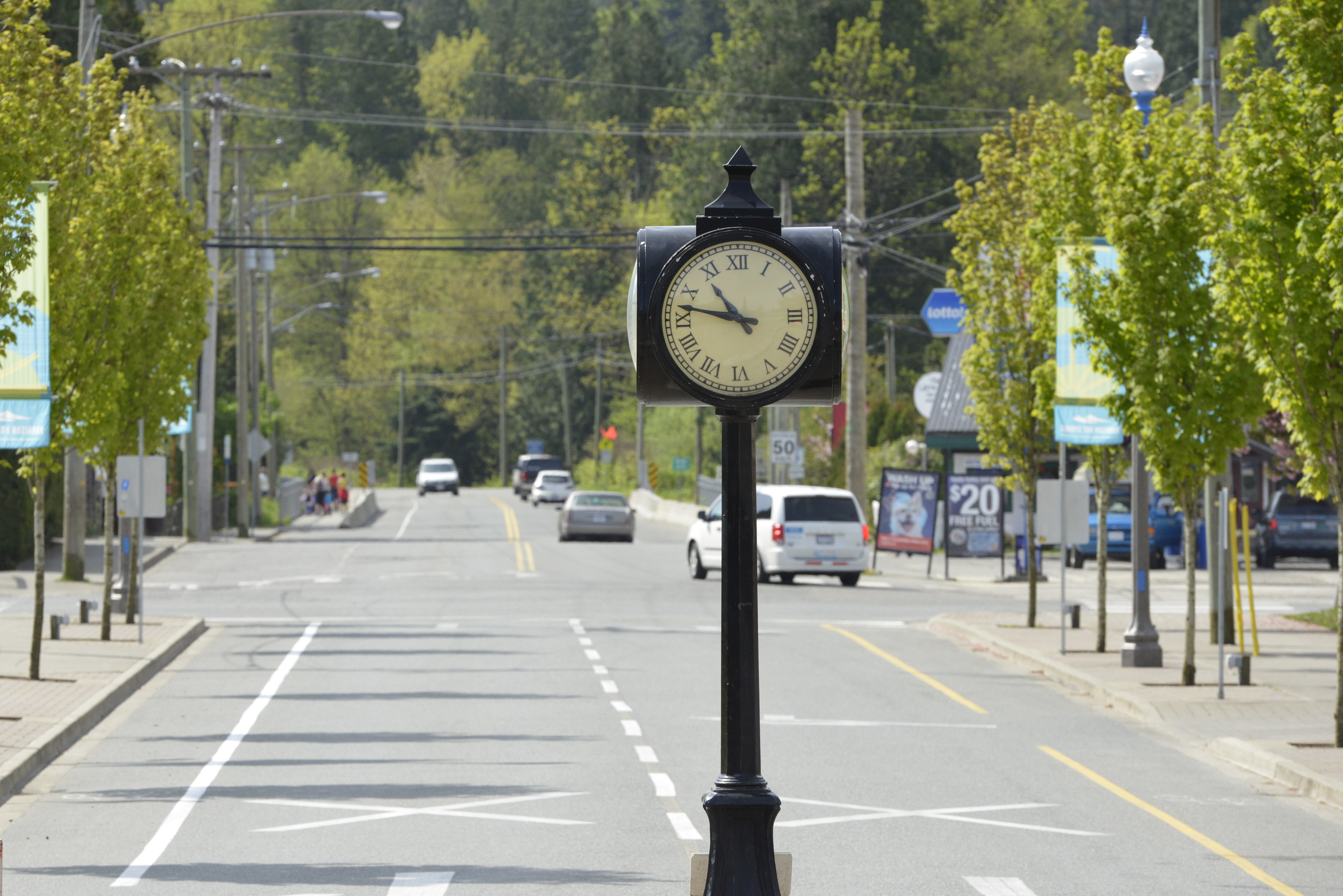
Northern terminus of Highway 9 in Harrison Hot Springs

Highway 9 is 16 km (10 mi) long. In the south, the Highway starts at an interchange on Highway 1 between Rosedale and the Bridal Falls area. Highway 9 travels north for 2.8 km (1.7 mi) to its 1.9-kilometre-long (1.2 mi) bridge over the Fraser River. After crossing the Fraser, Highway 9 travels north for 2.5 km (1.6 mi) to the centre of Agassiz. On the north side of Agassiz, Highway 9 meets Highway 7, and the two highways share a common alignment for 1.6 km (1.0 mi). Highway 9 then travels 6.4 km (4.0 mi) north to terminate at Harrison Hot Springs.

== Major intersections ==
From south to north. The entire route is in Fraser Valley Regional District.

Location	km	mi	Destinations	Notes
	0.00	0.00	Highway 1 (TCH) – Vancouver, Hope	Interchange (Highway 1 exit 135); Highway 9 southern terminus
	0.54	0.34	Yale Road – Chilliwack	Roundabout; former Highway 1A west
	2.81– 4.67	1.75– 2.90	Agassiz-Rosedale Bridge crosses the Fraser River	
Kent	5.44	3.38	Agassiz Bypass (Highway 901:2752) to Highway 7 east – Hope	
Kent	7.67	4.77	Highway 7 east (Lougheed Highway) – Hope	South end of Highway 7 concurrency
Kent	9.26	5.75	Highway 7 west (Lougheed Highway) – Mission, Vancouver	Agassiz; north end of Highway 7 concurrency
Harrison Hot Springs	15.65	9.72	Esplanade Avenue	Highway 9 northern terminus
1.000 mi = 1.609 km; 1.000 km = 0.621 mi: Concurrency terminus
