= British Columbia Highway 25 =

Former highway in British Columbia

Highway 25
- Terrace–Kitimat Highway

Route information
- Maintained by the Ministry of Transportation and Infrastructure
- Length: 59 km (37 mi)
- Existed: 1964 –1986
- History: Replaced by Hwy 37

Major junctions
- South end: Kitimat
- North end: Highway 16 (TCH) in Terrace

Location
- Country: Canada
- Province: British Columbia

Highway system
- British Columbia provincial highways
← Highway 24	→ Highway 26

British Columbia Highway 25, also known as the Terrace–Kitimat Highway, was a 59 km (37 mi) long spur of the Yellowhead Highway in the Regional District of Kitimat-Stikine. First opened on 28 September 1957 at a cost of $3.5 million ($34.83 million in 2022), it provides a connection from Terrace, on Highway 16, south to Kitimat. It received the number 25 in 1964. In 1986, Highway 25 was renumbered and absorbed by Highway 37. As part of the renumbering, Highway 37 follows a 91 km (57 mi) concurrency with Highway 16 between Kitwanga, the former southern terminus of Highway 37, and Terrace.

== See also ==
- Stewart–Cassiar Highway
