= British Columbia Highway 1A =

Highway in British Columbia

Highway 1A

Route information
- Auxiliary route of Highway 1
- Maintained by the Ministry of Transportation and Infrastructure

Location
- Country: Canada
- Province: British Columbia

Highway system
- British Columbia provincial highways
← Highway 1	→ Highway 2

There are many roads in the southwestern part of British Columbia and Vancouver Island that were designated as Highway 1A. These roads were sections of the original 1941 route of Highway 1 before its various re-alignments, and are used today as service routes and frontage roads. The "B.C. Highway 1A" designations were removed from these sections by the province between 2005 and 2010, although signage remains along some of the route and the designation on some maps.

== Vancouver Island ==
=== North Cowichan ===
Highway 1A
- Location: North Cowichan, Ladysmith
- Length: 17.4 km (10.8 mi)

A 17 km (11 mi) long segment of highway in North Cowichan and Ladysmith designated as Highway 1A. It starts in the south at the intersection of Highway 1 and Mount Sicker Road, the Highway follows Mount Sicker Road and Chemainus Road east for 2 km (1 1/4 mi) to an intersection with Crofton Road, which provides access to the community of Crofton. Chemainus Road and Highway 1A turns northwest, and goes for 15 km (9 mi) through Chemainus to the intersection with Roland Lane, where it subsequently turns west to meet the Trans-Canada Highway on the south end of Ladysmith. This route was the original Island Highway prior to the opening of the existing Trans-Canada Highway, which was constructed to bypass the Chemainus area in 1950.

Major intersections

The entire route is in Cowichan Valley Regional District.

Location	km	mi	Destinations	Notes
North Cowichan	0.00	0.00	Highway 1 (TCH) / Mount Sicker Road – Duncan, Victoria, Nanaimo	Highway 1A southern terminus; Highway 1A follows Mount Sicker Road
Halalt First Nation	0.60	0.37	Westholme Road / Chemainus Road	Highway 1A follows Chemainus Road
North Cowichan	2.30	1.43	Crofton Road (Highway 902:0365 east) – Crofton	To Salt Spring Island ferry
North Cowichan	7.02	4.36	Henry Road to Highway 1 (TCH) / Bare Point Road	
North Cowichan	8.73	5.42	Victoria Road / Oak Street	Chemainus; to Thetis Island and Penelakut Island ferries
Ladysmith	17.44	10.84	Highway 1 (TCH) / Davis Road – Victoria, Nanaimo	Highway 1A northern terminus; continues as Davis Road
1.000 mi = 1.609 km; 1.000 km = 0.621 mi

=== Greater Victoria ===
Highway 1A (Island Highway)
- Location: Victoria, Saanich, View Royal, Colwood, Langford
- Length: 16 km (9.9 mi)
- Existed: 1956–1990s

Since 1941, Highway 1A went from Victoria to Kelsey Bay, ending at the wharf. By 1960, Highway 1 ended at Nanaimo's Departure Bay Ferry terminal.

A 16 km (9.9 mi) long segment of highway in Greater Victoria was designated as Highway 1A. It started in Victoria at the intersection of Hillside Avenue and Government Street, following Gorge Road West for 5 km (3.1 mi) until it reached an intersection at Admirals Road, and crossed the Craigflower Bridge. Highway 1A then proceeded west along the Old Island Highway for 5 km (3.1 mi) to Goldstream Avenue. Highway 1A continued onto Goldstream Avenue and proceeded west through downtown Langford for 6 km (3.7 mi) to its termination at Highway 1 just short of Goldstream Provincial Park. This route was the original Island Highway prior to the opening of the existing Trans-Canada Highway route in 1955 and 1956.

== Lower Mainland ==
Highway 1A
- Location: Surrey, Langley, Abbotsford
- Length: 29 km (18 mi)

Highway 1A
- Location: West Vancouver, Vancouver, Burnaby, New Westminster, Surrey, Langley, Abbotsford
- Length: 74 km (46 mi)
- Existed: 1973–2006

Until the Highway 1 Freeway (originally the "401") was built in the mid-1960s, much of the Fraser Highway was part of the Trans-Canada Highway. It was built along the route of Old Yale Road, which was first built in 1874 between Yale and New Westminster. The Fraser Highway route was designated as Highway 1 from 1941 to 1972 while the new freeway was designated as Highway 401 until 1972. In 1973, the freeway route became Highway 1 while the Fraser Highway became Highway 1A. In 2006, Highway 1A was decommissioned between Downtown Vancouver and Abbotsford, with a 4 km (2 1/2 mi) segment of Highway 1A between West Vancouver and Vancouver remaining, but concurrent with Highway 99 for its entirety; the 1A designation was eventually deemed redundant and dropped in 2016.

=== Route description ===
Highway 1A began at Highway 1 (Exit 13) in West Vancouver and shared the alignment with Highway 99 along Taylor Way, Marine Drive, the Lions Gate Bridge and the Stanley Park Causeway through Stanley Park to Georgia Street the West End and Downtown Vancouver. Highway 99 diverges south along Howe Street (northbound Highway 99 uses Seymour Street), and Highway 1A shared 28 km (17 mi) long concurrency with Highway 99A. The route followed the Georgia Viaduct out of downtown to Main Street (westbound traffic used Dunsmuir Street) to Main Street. It then followed Kingsway through East Vancouver and Burnaby to New Westminster, where it followed 10th Avenue (which forms the boundary between Burnaby and New Westminster) and McBride Boulevard. It crossed the Fraser River along the Pattullo Bridge into Surrey, where the roadway became the King George Highway (renamed King George Boulevard in 2009). Highways 1A and 99A diverged with Highway 1A following the Fraser Highway southeast intersecting Highway 15 before reaching Highway 10 in Langley. Highway 1A briefly left Fraser Highway (which passes through downtown Langley), following the Langley Bypass and a short concurrency with Highway 10 to Glover Road, before rejoining Fraser Highway. Highway 1A continued southeast to Highway 13 at Aldergrove (in Langley Township), and continued into Abbotsford where it terminated at Highway 1 (Exit 83), just east of Mount Lehman Road. Its total pre-2006 length was 74 kilometres (46 mi).

With the decommissioning of the Highway 1A designation, the original Trans-Canada Highway route is now known merely as the Fraser Highway between Surrey to Abbotsford. The province of British Columbia still has a 29 km (18 mi) section of the Fraser Highway between Highway 15 and Highway 13 in its highway inventory; however the route is maintained by TransLink. Despite the decommissioning of the route as of 2023 brand new 1A and 99A route markers can be found along the route.

The new DriveBC Beta website displays the most "recent" alignment of highway 1A as a complete, official signed highway route from its shared alignment with 99 north of the Lions Gate through Vancouver, New Westminster, Surrey, and the Langley Bypass to its junction with BC 1 in Abbotsford. 99A is shown in concurrency from the 1A junction to the Lions Gate but not down King George blvd to the border.

=== Major intersections ===
Regional District	Location	km	mi	Destinations	Notes
Metro Vancouver	West Vancouver	−44.60	−27.71	Taylor Way north Highway 1 (TCH) / Highway 99 north – Horseshoe Bay, Squamish, Whistler, North Vancouver	Former Highway 1A western terminus; Highway 1 exit 13; west end of Highway 99 concurrency; continues as Taylor Way
Metro Vancouver	West Vancouver	−43.50	−27.03	Marine Drive west / Taylor Way south	Highway 99 / former Highway 1A follows Marine Drive
Metro Vancouver	West Vancouver	−42.60	−26.47	Marine Drive east to Capilano Road / Highway 1 (TCH)	Highway 99 / former Highway 1A follows Lions Gate Bridge approach
Burrard Inlet		−42.30– −40.90	−26.28– −25.41	Lions Gate Bridge	
Metro Vancouver	Vancouver	−40.50	−25.17	Stanley Park Drive – Stanley Park	Closed during peak hours; no southbound entrance
Metro Vancouver	Vancouver	−38.80	−24.11	North Lagoon Drive – Stanley Park	Interchange; no southbound exit
Metro Vancouver	Vancouver	−36.70– −36.50	−22.80– −22.68	Howe Street / Seymour Street (Highway 99 south) – Airport, BC Ferries (Tsawwassen), Seattle	One-way pair; east end of Highway 99 concurrency; west end of former Highway 99A concurrency
Metro Vancouver	Vancouver	−36.00– −35.10	−22.37– −21.81	Georgia and Dunsmuir Viaduct	
Metro Vancouver	Vancouver	−35.10	−21.81	Main Street north / Prior Street east	Former Highway 1A / Highway 99A follows Main Street
Metro Vancouver	Vancouver	−33.70– −33.50	−20.94– −20.82	Kingsway / Broadway (Highway 7) / Main Street south	Former Highway 1A / Highway 99A follows Kingsway
Metro Vancouver	Burnaby–New Westminster boundary	−20.00	−12.43	10th Avenue west / 12th Street south	Former Highway 1A / Highway 99A follows 10th Avenue
Metro Vancouver	Burnaby–New Westminster boundary	−18.00	−11.18	McBride Boulevard / 10th Avenue east	Former Highway 1A / Highway 99A follows McBride Boulevard
Metro Vancouver	New Westminster	−16.10	−10.00	Royal Avenue / Columbia Street	Grade separated
Fraser River		−15.80– −14.60	−9.82– −9.07	stal̕əw̓asəm Bridge	
Metro Vancouver	Surrey	−14.00	−8.70	Scott Road	Grade separated
Metro Vancouver	Surrey	−13.40	−8.33	Bridgeview Drive to Highway 17 / Highway 1 (TCH) / 128th Street – Hope	
Metro Vancouver	Surrey	−9.40	−5.84	Fraser Highway / King George Boulevard south	Former Highway 1A follows Fraser Highway; east end of former Highway 99A concurrency
Metro Vancouver	Surrey	0.00	0.00	Highway 15 (176th Street / Pacific Highway)	Highway 1A western terminus
Metro Vancouver	Langley (township)–Langley (city) boundary	5.24	3.26	Highway 10 west (Langley Bypass) / Fraser Highway – Surrey, Ferries, Airport (YVR) Fraser Highway east – Langley City Centre	Highway 1A follows Langley Bypass; west end of Highway 10 concurrency
Metro Vancouver	Langley (city)	5.77	3.59	200th Street	To Golden Ears Bridge
Metro Vancouver	Langley (city)	6.62	4.11	204th Street	Grade separated; westbound exit and entrance
Metro Vancouver	Langley (city)	7.47	4.64	Glover Road (Highway 10 east) to Highway 1 (TCH) – Fort Langley, Langley City Centre	East end of Highway 10 concurrency
Metro Vancouver	Langley (city)	9.40	5.84	Fraser Highway west / 208th Street south	Highway 1A follows Fraser Highway
Metro Vancouver	Langley (township)	20.75	12.89	Highway 13 (264th Street) to Highway 1 (TCH) – U.S. Border, Bellingham	Aldergrove; Highway 1A eastern terminus
Fraser Valley	Abbotsford	28.05– 29.25	17.43– 18.18	Highway 1 (TCH) / Mount Lehman Road / Maclure Road east – Vancouver, Hope, Airport (YXX)	Highway 1 exit 83; former Highway 1A eastern terminus; continues as Maclure Road
1.000 mi = 1.609 km; 1.000 km = 0.621 mi: Closed/former; Concurrency terminus; Incomplete access

=== Chilliwack ===
Highway 1A
- Location: Chilliwack
- Length: 18 km (11 mi)
- Existed: 1973–1990s

The Chilliwack-Rosedale Yale Road East section ran from the Trans-Canada Highway at the Vedder Road crossing (Exit 119), through Chilliwack and Rosedale, and reconnecting to the Trans-Canada Highway along with Highway 9 (Exit 135). This section of what was originally the Yale Road was part of the original Trans-Canada Highway route until the completion of the "401" Freeway section in the 1960s. In 2005, the City of Chilliwack posted signage along the Yale Road East section designating it as the "Trans-Canada Parallel Route".

== Kicking Horse Pass ==
Highway 1A
- Location: Yoho National Park
- Length: 2 km (1.2 mi)
- Existed: 1962–2000s

A former section of Highway 1A exists along the former Kicking Horse Trail, the original road between Lake Louise and Golden that opened in 1926. When the Trans-Canada Highway was realigned in 1962, the segment became Highway 1A. It began at Highway 1, 3 km (1 3/4 mi) west of the Alberta border in Yoho National Park and meandered eastward through Kicking Horse Pass to Lake Louise. The route is now closed to vehicle traffic and is part the Great Divide hiking trail.
