= Offset T-intersection =

Type of road intersections

Offset T-Intersection

An offset T-intersection is an at-grade road intersection where a conventional four leg intersection is split into two three-leg T-intersections to reduce the number of conflicts and improve traffic flow. Building the offset T-intersections as continuous green T-intersections (also called seagull intersection), there is a single stop on the arterial road, only. A higher volume of through traffic on the cross road, or on unsignalized intersections, a rebuild to a conventional four-leg intersection may be adequate, also when the offset is a few feet only like staggered junctions causing slower traffic for a longer time on the arterial road.

Seen as a spur route or access road, offset T-intersections can be seen as an A2 or B2 type partial cloverleaf interchange with no arterial road.

== See also ==
- Split intersection
- Hamburger intersection (Throughabout)
