= British Columbia Highway 10 =

Highway in British Columbia

Highway 10
- 56/58 Avenue, Langley Bypass, Glover Road
- Highway 10 highlighted in red.

Route information
- Maintained by the Ministry of Transportation and Infrastructure
- Length: 26.59 km (16.52 mi)
- Existed: 1953–present

Major junctions
- West end: Highway 91 in Delta
- Highway 15 in Surrey
- East end: Highway 1 (TCH) in Langley

Location
- Country: Canada
- Province: British Columbia
- Municipalities: Langley (township)
- Major cities: Delta, Surrey, Langley (city)

Highway system
- British Columbia provincial highways
← Highway 9	→ Highway 11

Highway 10 is a minor east-west route through the southern portion of Greater Vancouver. Highway 10 is used mainly as a local access route in North Delta, Surrey and Langley, its former connector role between South Delta and Highway 1 having been taken over by the Highway 17 (South Fraser Perimeter Road).

== Route details ==
Highway 10 travels for a total length of 26.6 km (16.5 mi) from North Delta to Langley. In the west, the highway begins at an interchange with Highway 91 as a continuation of the Ladner Trunk Road. It travels northeast before turning onto 58 Avenue as it crosses from Delta into Surrey near Watershed Park. Highway 10 then travels through residential neighborhoods in Newton and dips south to intersect King George Boulevard in a split junction near a courthouse complex.

The highway continues east on 56 Avenue through a rural zone before reaching Cloverdale, where it intersects Highway 15. Highway 10 then crosses into the City of Langley and travels around the north side of the city centre on the Langley Bypass. The bypass intersects the Fraser Highway at the Willowbrook Shopping Centre and continues east through an industrial and retail area towards the outskirts of the city. Highway 10 leaves the bypass near the Kwantlen Polytechnic University Langley campus, turning northeast to follow Glover Road into Langley Township.

Highway 10 continues northeast through a rural area of Langley Township and turns east onto Springbrook Road near the Trinity Western University campus. The highway then turns north onto 232 Street and terminates at a cloverleaf interchange with Highway 1.

== History ==
Highway 10 was first commissioned in 1953, following its current alignment from Ladner east to Scott Road in Delta/Surrey, then turning north onto Scott Road. The section west of King George Highway was built over the following years by the provincial government.

The bypass of the Langley city centre opened on July 14, 1966, and was accompanied on its first day by several collisions—seriously injuring two people and killing one person. When the bypass first opened it only went as far east as Glover Road.

In 1967, the highway was re-aligned to continue on the Langley bypass and other roads to a junction with Highway 1 at 232nd Street.

On August 28, 1980, the non Highway 10 section of Langley Bypass between Glover Road and Fraser Highway was officially opened.

In 2003, all sections of Highway 10 west of the Highway 91 interchange were removed from the provincial highway system; this was done to keep large trucks off the road and out of rural Delta. The municipality of Delta now maintains this segment of the old highway, now only known as Ladner Trunk Road (locally, it is still referred to as part of Highway 10).

== Major intersections ==
The entire route is in Metro Vancouver Regional District.

Location	km	mi	Destinations	Notes
Delta	−11.80	−7.33	Highway 17A – Tsawwassen, Ferries	Ladner; former Highway 10 western terminus; former Highway 17; Highway 10 followed Ladner Trunk Road
Delta	−4.60	−2.86	Highway 99 – Vancouver, USA border, Seattle	Interchange (Highway 99 exit 20)
Delta	0.00	0.00	Highway 91 to Highway 99 – New Westminster, Airport (YVR), USA border	Highway 10 western terminus; interchange (Highway 91 exit 2); becomes 58th Avenue
Delta–Surrey boundary	1.31	0.81	Scott Road (120th Street)	
Surrey	5.76	3.58	King George Boulevard	Split intersection; becomes 56th Avenue; former Highway 99A
Surrey	12.55	7.80	Highway 15 (176th Street) – Highway 1, USA border	Cloverdale
Surrey	16.00	9.94	192nd Street	Becomes Langley Bypass
Langley (township)–Langley (city) boundary	17.44	10.84	Fraser Highway (Highway 1A west) – New Westminster, Langley City Centre	West end of Highway 1A concurrency
Langley (city)	17.97	11.17	200th Street	Connects to Golden Ears Bridge
Langley (city)	18.82	11.69	204th Street	Interchange; westbound to northbound exit; southbound to westbound entrance
Langley (city)	19.67	12.22	Langley Bypass (Highway 1A east) – Aldergrove Glover Road – Langley City Centre	Highway 10 follows Glover Road; east end of former Highway 1A concurrency
Langley (township)	23.28	14.47	Glover Road – Fort Langley Springbrook Road	Highway 10 follows Springbrook Road
Langley (township)	26.59	16.52	Highway 1 (TCH) – Vancouver, Hope 232nd Street – Fort Langley	Highway 10 eastern terminus; interchange (Highway 1 exit 66)
1.000 mi = 1.609 km; 1.000 km = 0.621 mi: Closed/former; Concurrency terminus; Incomplete access
