= British Columbia Highway 15 =

Highway in British Columbia

Highway 15 and State Route 543
- Pacific Highway; 176th Street
- Highways 15 and 543 highlighted in red.

Route information
- Maintained by B.C. MoT and WSDOT
- Length: 21.77 km (13.53 mi)
- History: BC: 1913 – present WA: 1919 – present

Washington State Route 543
- Length: 1.75 km (1.09 mi)
- South end: I-5 in Blaine, Washington
- North end: Pacific Highway Border Crossing of the Canada–US border

British Columbia Highway 15
- Length: 20.02 km (12.44 mi)
- South end: Canada–US border
- Major intersections: Highway 10 in Surrey; Golden Ears Way in Surrey
- North end: Highway 1 (TCH) / Highway 17 in Surrey

Location
- Country: Canada

Highway system
- British Columbia provincial highways
- State highways in Washington; Interstate; US; State; Scenic; Pre-1964; 1964 renumbering; Former
← Highway 14	BC 15	→ Highway 16
← SR 542	SR 543	→ SR 544

Highway 15 (BC 15), known locally as the Pacific Highway, is a 20.99-kilometre-long (13.04 mi) north–south highway primarily located in the City of Surrey, British Columbia. The southern terminus is with Interstate 5 (I-5) near Blaine, Washington, as State Route 543 (SR 543). SR 543 is a 1.75-kilometre-long (1.09 mi) connector between I-5 and the Canada–US border, linking with BC 15. Over 3,000 trucks per day pass through the border crossing along SR 543 and BC 15, because the Peace Arch border crossing does not allow commercial trucks.

== Route description ==
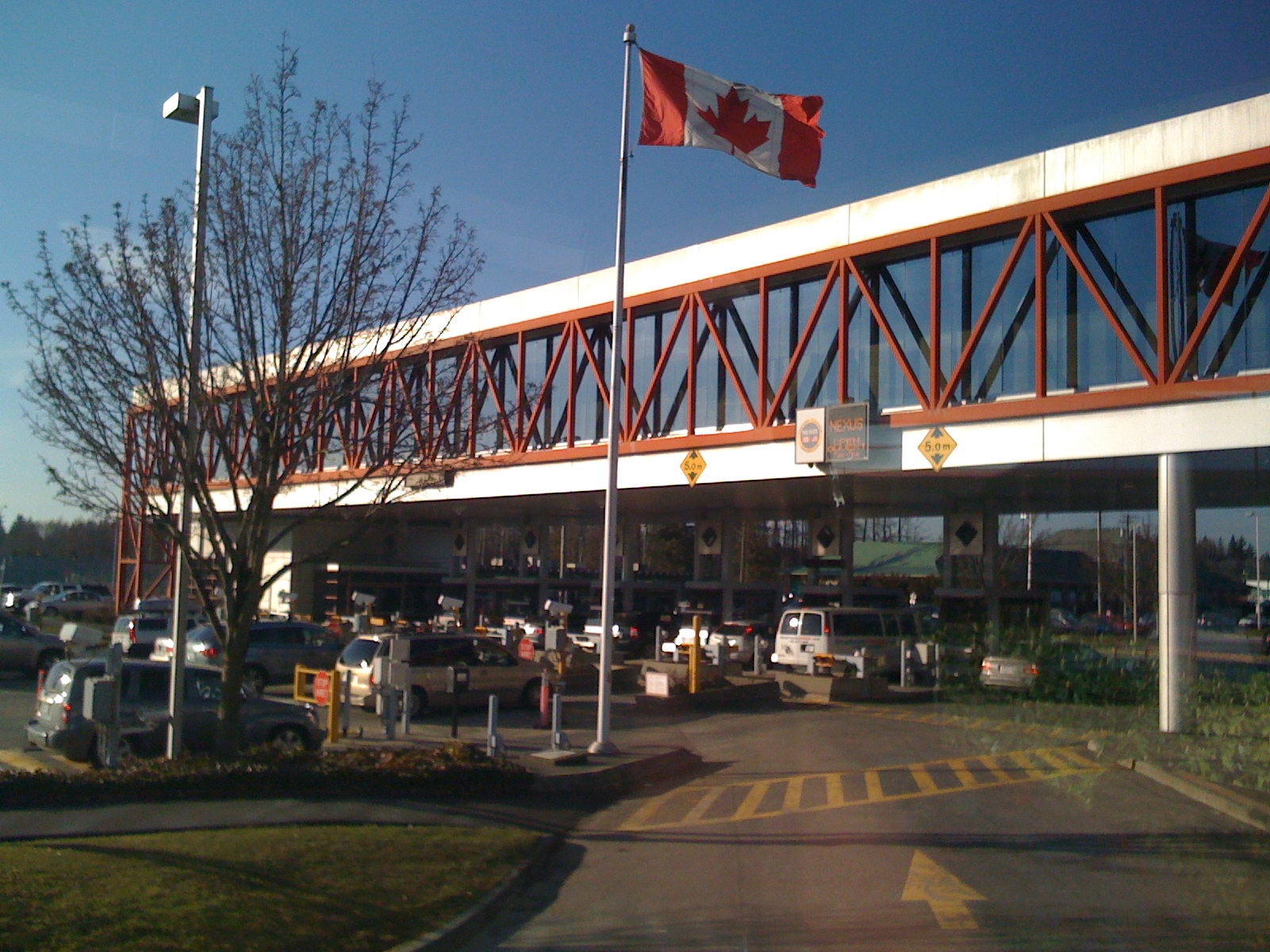
Canadian border control at the Pacific Highway Border Crossing

SR 543 is a short highway entirely within the city of Blaine, Washington, that connects I-5 with the Canada–United States border. It begins at an interchange with I-5 with access only from the south and travels north through an industrial area with three lanes—two that run northbound and one southbound. The highway passes between Blaine High School and the former municipal airport with signalized intersections at Boblett and H streets. From here, SR 543 widens to five lanes and passes under an interchange with D Street with interior ramps providing access to a residential area and non-border areas.

As it approaches Canadian customs at the 24-hour Pacific Highway Border Crossing, the highway splits into several paths. Northbound traffic from the D Street interchange is directed into a NEXUS lane for passenger vehicles, while two lanes are used for general traffic and access to duty free stores. A set of lanes curve east and are used for buses and trucks that qualify for pre-clearance under the Free and Secure Trade program. Southbound traffic entering the United States is split into a general queue and a truck route with holding lanes. Border crossing times can become significantly delayed such as in the event of certain Seattle Mariners baseball games and summer holiday travel. During the reconstruction of the Peace Arch border crossing, delays at the Pacific Highway crossing were similar to times seen right after the attacks of September 11.

On the Canadian side of the border, the highway continues north as British Columbia Highway 15, which lies within the municipality of Surrey, British Columbia. It passes the residential neighborhood of Douglas and intersects 8 Avenue, which provides access to Highway 99 to the west. Highway 15 travels north as a divided highway through rural forestland and farmland in the Kensington Prairie, where it crosses the Nicomekl River. The highway enters the Cloverdale neighborhood and curves to the west as it crosses the Southern Railway of British Columbia and intersects Highway 10, an east–west route with connections to Surrey-Panorama and the city of Langley. Highway 15 travels around a commercial district and returns east to its original alignment on 176th Street as it passes Cloverdale's casino and fairgrounds.

The highway leaves Cloverdale and intersects the Fraser Highway at a rural junction near a crossing of the Serpentine River. Highway 15 continues north to a junction with Golden Ears Way, which crosses the Fraser River to reach Pitt Meadows, and terminates at an interchange with Highway 1 (part of the Trans-Canada Highway). The interchange also marks the southern terminus of Highway 17, a divided highway that follows the southern bank of the Fraser River through industrial areas in Surrey and continues southwest towards Delta.

== History ==
=== British Columbia ===
The Pacific Highway was opened as a gravel road on July 12, 1913, and again on August 3, 1923, as a paved road. The highway was rerouted in the mid-seventies around Cloverdale onto a bypass route which included a then new overhead. The overhead was named after a slain RCMP officer named Roger Pierlet and was opened on May 19, 1976. In 1985 and 1986 the highway was widened to four lanes from the U.S. Border to 32 Avenue. From 2005 to 2008, the highway was widened to four lanes from 32 Avenue, through Cloverdale and to 92 Avenue. The project was a part of the Border Infrastructure Program, which sought to improve several highways around Metro Vancouver.

For a time between 1942 and 1962, BC 15 was designated number 99A after the King George Highway (Hwy. 99 from 1942 to 1972, Hwy. 99A from 1973 to 2006) superseded it as the primary route to the Canada–US border. In 2009, the city of Surrey renamed "King George Highway" to "King George Boulevard".

On December 21, 2013, the C$1 billion South Fraser Perimeter Road opened as part of Highway 17, linking the northern terminus of BC 15 to Delta in the west.

=== Washington ===
Prior to the current Washington route numbering system, this route was designated as Primary State Highway 1 Truck Route. It ran east–west along D Street from US 99 to the Pacific Highway border crossing. A 1.3-mile (2.1 km) expressway to serve the border crossing and connect it with I-5 was planned in the late 1960s to relocate truck traffic from city streets. Construction of the new expressway was deferred in 1967 due to a federal cap on funds for highway projects.

The relocation of SR 543 was approved by the Blaine city government in 1970 following negotiations with the state to add traffic signals. The Great Northern Railway also proposed moving its tracks inland to the new truck route corridor, but those plans were shelved. The new truck route opened on January 20, 1972, at a cost of $640,000.

The Washington State Department of Transportation began reconstruction of SR 543 in May 2006 to expand the highway to five lanes between H Street and the border crossing. The existing truck lane was closed in October 2006 and was rebuilt to separate freight traffic from other vehicles accessing the border crossing and adjacent duty free store. The truck lane reopened in December 2007 with access to a Free and Secure Trade lane for pre-approved commercial vehicles. The roadbed of SR 543 was lowered by 25 feet (7.6 m) to accommodate an overpass carrying D Street, which opened to traffic in November 2007. A full interchange at D Street opened on February 11, 2008, marking completion of the US$50.8 million project.

== Major intersections ==
State/Province	County/Regional District	Location	km	mi	Destinations	Notes
Washington	Whatcom	Blaine	0.00	0.00	I-5 south – Bellingham, Seattle	Northbound entrance, southbound exit; SR 543 southern terminus; I-5 exit 275
Washington	Whatcom	Blaine	1.32	0.82	D Street – Blaine City Center	Interchange; northbound access for NEXUS passholders only
Canada–United States border			1.75 0.00	1.09 0.00	Pacific Highway Border Crossing; SR 543 northern terminus • Highway 15 southern terminus	
British Columbia	Metro Vancouver	Surrey	1.53	0.95	8th Avenue (Highway 901:3188 west) to Highway 99 / I-5 – White Rock, Vancouver, Peace Arch Border Crossing	
British Columbia	Metro Vancouver	Surrey	11.29	7.02	Highway 10 (56th Avenue) – Delta, Langley	
British Columbia	Metro Vancouver	Surrey	15.19	9.44	Fraser Highway (Highway 1A west) – New Westminster, Langley City Centre	
British Columbia	Metro Vancouver	Surrey	19.45	12.09	Golden Ears Way (Highway 916 east) / 96th Avenue – Maple Ridge, Golden Ears Bridge	
British Columbia	Metro Vancouver	Surrey	20.02	12.44	Highway 1 (TCH) – Vancouver, Hope Highway 17 south (South Fraser Perimeter Road) – Delta	Highway 15 northern terminus; Highway 1 exit 53; continues as Highway 17
1.000 mi = 1.609 km; 1.000 km = 0.621 mi: Incomplete access; Route transition
