= Split intersection =

Type of road intersection

Split intersection

A split intersection is a rarely-built at-grade variant of the diamond interchange. Compared to a conventional four-leg intersection or road crossing, the arterial road is split into separate carriageways by 200 to 300 feet (61 to 91 m), which allows a queue of left turning vehicles behind a completed turn into the crossroad without any conflict to oncoming traffic. On the crossroad, the four-leg intersection is replaced by two intersections.

The beginning of one-way traffic at the fourth leg makes the intersections reduce the number of conflicts, similarly to a three-leg T-intersection, to improve traffic flow.

== Existing examples ==
- At Legacy Drive and Preston Road, Plano, Texas, with Texas U-turn lanes, 33.070835°N 96.796246°W
- At New Dallas Highway (US-77) and E. Industrial Boulevard TX-340 in Lacy Lakeview, Texas, 31.605353°N 97.110952°W
- At Stock Road and Winterfold Road in Perth, Australia
- It is the most common intersection design on Utah State Route 85, also called Mountain View Corridor. They are planned to be later converted, mostly into diamond interchanges, by adding a bridge in the middle.
- At Sarcee Trail and Richmond Road, Calgary, Alberta, Canada, 51.018046°N 114.165263°W
- Four intersections along Terwillegar Drive in Edmonton, Alberta, Canada
- Four intersections along Manning Drive in Edmonton, Alberta, Canada
- Lake Woodlands Drive at Grogans Mill Road in The Woodlands, Texas; 30.165692°N 95.466449°W
- Along Highway 10 in Surrey, British Columbia, at the intersection with King George Boulevard; 49.1048703°N 122.8315582°W
- At West Ridge Road (NY-104) and Long Pond Road, in Greece, New York. This intersection is also signed as a Truck U-Turn, as trucks wishing to access commercial property on the opposite side of the divided roadway are only permitted to perform U-Turns at intersections signed as such.

== Town center intersection ==
Town Center Intersection (TCI)

A town center intersection (TCI) is similar to a split intersection; however, both the arterial road and the crossroad are split into separated one-way streets. The resulting grid, most often implemented in a city, reduces conflicts to two directions per intersection.

The TCI's grade-separated variant is the three-level diamond interchange.

=== Examples ===
- Grogans Mill Road at Research Forest Drive in The Woodlands, Texas; 30.176893°N 95.466073°W
- Springwoods Village Parkway at Holzwarth Road in Spring, Texas; 30.096443°N 95.451283°W
- San Elijo Road at Elfin Forest Road in San Marcos, California; 33.098444°N 117.199894°W
- 170 Street and Stony Plain Road and 100 Ave in Edmonton, Alberta.

== See also ==
- Offset T-intersection
- Hamburger intersection (Throughabout)
