= Kingsway (Vancouver) =

Major road in British Columbia

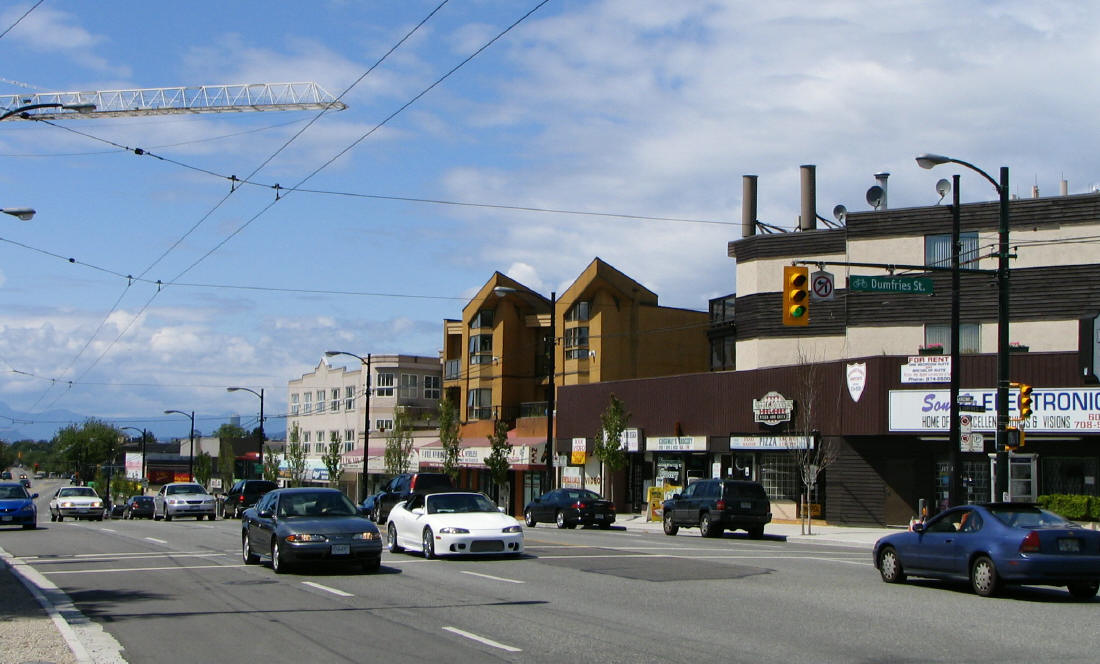
- Kingsway at Dumfries Street, near King Edward Avenue
- Part of: Former Highway 1A / Highway 99A
- Maintained by: Cities of Vancouver and Burnaby
- Length: 13.7 km (8.5 mi)
- Location: Vancouver – Burnaby
- West end: Main Street (Vancouver)
- Major junctions: Broadway (Highway 7); Fraser Street; Knight Street; Joyce Street; Boundary Road; Willingdon Avenue
- East end: 10th Avenue (Burnaby / New Westminster)

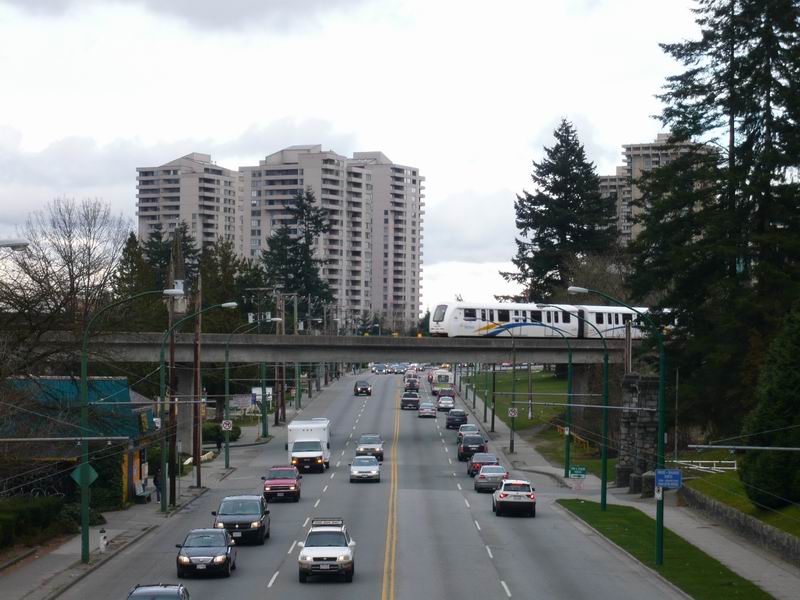
SkyTrain tracks crossing over Kingsway east of Boundary Road

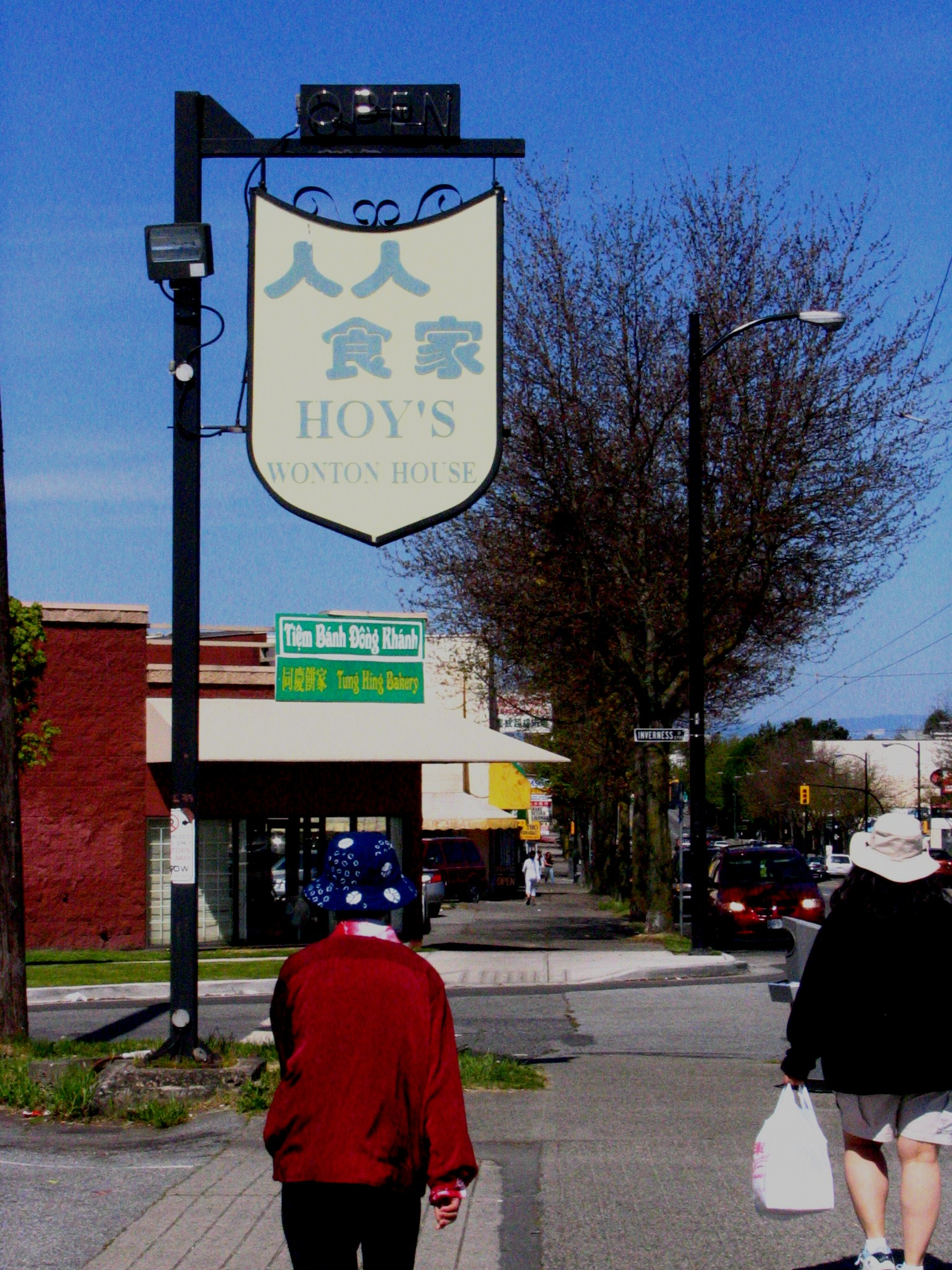
Chinese and Vietnamese eateries along Kingsway in East Vancouver

Kingsway is a major thoroughfare that crosses through the Canadian cities of Vancouver and Burnaby, British Columbia. The road runs diagonally from northwest to southeast, emerging from Vancouver's Main Street just south of East 7th Avenue and becoming 12th Street at the Burnaby–New Westminster border.

== Description ==
Kingsway is one of the longest roads in the Metropolitan Vancouver area and is therefore somewhat difficult to characterize. Many segments of the road offer diverse family-owned and ethnic shopping opportunities and restaurants – particularly Korean, Chinese, Vietnamese, Taiwanese, Japanese, and South Asian, among others. There are also a number of hotels, supermarkets, and freestanding fast-food locations along other portions of its route. The road forms the central commercial spine for Burnaby's Metrotown business district, and is the principal route between Metrotown and Downtown Vancouver.

Kingsway is one of the region's main public transit corridors, with numerous bus routes operating along the road. In addition, the SkyTrain tracks mostly parallel Kingsway from Victoria Drive in Vancouver to Edmonds Street in Burnaby, crossing from the road's north side to its south side east of Boundary Road around Central Park.

== History ==
Kingsway follows the Indigenous trail used by Canada's first peoples for hundreds of years. When the wagon road was built over it by the Royal Engineers between Vancouver's historic Gastown waterfront and the former capital of the Colony of British Columbia at New Westminster, as recommended by Colonel Richard Moody to facilitate troops movement between the two points. The trail (also known as the False Creek Trail) opened in 1860, and cut diagonally across Burrard Peninsula following its gentlest incline, peaking near Metrotown in Burnaby. The road thus lies at an angle to Vancouver's street grid, which had not yet been laid when the road was first built. As Vancouver became established with a street grid beyond Gastown, the route was named Westminster Road; the stretch of what is now Main Street from 7th Avenue north to the waterfront, seen as a continuation of Westminster Road, was similarly named Westminster Avenue.

The stretch of the road through Burnaby was widened in 1872, and eventually became known as the Vancouver Road. This section of the road was further improved following Burnaby's municipal incorporation in 1892; together with the opening of a parallel interurban line connecting Vancouver and New Westminster the previous year, the area along the road became increasingly favourable for settlement. The provincial and municipal governments joined forces in 1912 to improve and pave the road, which officially reopened on September 30, 1913 as Kingsway.

During the Great Depression of the 1930s, government make-work projects saw labourers widen Kingsway considerably, so that now it has six lanes along most of its length. The road was numbered provincial Highway 1 and Highway 99, and was also a component of the Trans-Canada Highway until that designation was transferred to the newly constructed freeway-standard Highway 401 in 1964. Kingsway remained as part of Highways 1 and 99 until those numbers were respectively transferred to the new Trans-Canada Highway and the Deas Island Throughway (also freeway-standard, hitherto Highway 499) between 1971 and 1972, at which point the road became an official alternate route for the Trans-Canada Highway (as Highway 1A) and Highway 99 (as Highway 99A) until those designations were cancelled in the 2000s.

In October 2011, Vancouver City Council approved a motion put forward by Councillor Kerry Jang to consider designating the section of Kingsway between Fraser and Nanaimo Streets as Little Saigon; the designation took effect for the stretch of Kingsway between Fraser and Knight streets in May 2013.

== Tribute ==
The Canadian poet Michael Turner based his book of poetry, Kingsway, on the road. Vancouver illustrator Bambi Edlund includes an Ode to Kingsway in her daily drawing project.

== Major intersections ==
Location	km	mi	Destinations	Notes
Vancouver	0.0	0.0	Main Street – City Centre	Former Highway 1A / Highway 99A followed Main Street north
Vancouver	0.2	0.12	E Broadway (Highway 7)	Former Highway 1A / Highway 99A followed Main Street north
Vancouver	0.6	0.37	E 12th Avenue	To Highway 1 (TCH)
Vancouver	1.2	0.75	Fraser Street	
Vancouver	2.5	1.6	Knight Street	
Vancouver	2.8	1.7	E King Edward Avenue	
Vancouver	3.4	2.1	Victoria Drive (to Commercial Drive)	
Vancouver	4.1	2.5	Nanaimo Street	Near Nanaimo station
Vancouver	5.4	3.4	Rupert Street	
Vancouver	5.9	3.7	Joyce Street (to E 41st Avenue)	Near Joyce-Collingwood station
Vancouver–Burnaby boundary	6.9	4.3	Boundary Road	
Burnaby	7.7	4.8	Patterson Avenue	Near Patterson station
Burnaby	8.3	5.2	Willingdon Avenue	Near Metrotown station and Metropolis at Metrotown
Burnaby	9.6	6.0	Royal Oak Avenue	Royal Oak station
Burnaby	10.4	6.5	Griffiths Drive	Near Edmonds station
Burnaby	11.1	6.9	Edmonds Street	
Burnaby–New Westminster boundary	13.7	8.5	10th Avenue – Pattullo Bridge, Surrey	Former Highway 1A / Highway 99A followed 10th Avenue east; roadway becomes 12th Street
New Westminster	15.5	9.6	Stewardson Way (to Columbia Street)	
1.000 mi = 1.609 km; 1.000 km = 0.621 mi: Route transition

== See also ==
- Royal eponyms in Canada
