= Rosedale, Chilliwack =

Coordinates: 49°10′50″N 121°48′17″W

Location of Rosedale in British Columbia

Rosedale is a farming-based community located east of Chilliwack, British Columbia. This small community is based alongside the Fraser River. It serves as a base for many tourists, both in summer and winter. The hills and valleys of British Columbia are popular for tourists who enjoy outdoor activities such as skiing, snowboarding and dogsledding locations. In summer, rockclimbing and whitewater rafting are the primary activities in the Fraser Valley.

During the 2006-2007 BC school year, a middle school located in Rosedale, Rosedale Middle School, was transformed into the Chilliwack School District's first traditional school. Rosedale now boasts a combined elementary and middle school, which first opened its doors in 2012.

== Climate ==
Climate data for Rosedale
Month	Jan	Feb	Mar	Apr	May	Jun	Jul	Aug	Sep	Oct	Nov	Dec	Year
Record high °C (°F)	17.8 (64.0)	20 (68)	22 (72)	31 (88)	38 (100)	35 (95)	35.5 (95.9)	36.7 (98.1)	32.8 (91.0)	28 (82)	19.4 (66.9)	16.7 (62.1)	38 (100)
Mean daily maximum °C (°F)	4.8 (40.6)	7.6 (45.7)	10.9 (51.6)	14.4 (57.9)	18.1 (64.6)	20.8 (69.4)	24.1 (75.4)	24.5 (76.1)	20.7 (69.3)	15.1 (59.2)	8.1 (46.6)	4.7 (40.5)	14.5 (58.1)
Mean daily minimum °C (°F)	−0.9 (30.4)	0.7 (33.3)	2.4 (36.3)	4.3 (39.7)	7.6 (45.7)	10.2 (50.4)	11.9 (53.4)	12 (54)	9.8 (49.6)	5.8 (42.4)	2 (36)	−0.5 (31.1)	5.4 (41.7)
Record low °C (°F)	−16.1 (3.0)	−15 (5)	−11.7 (10.9)	−5 (23)	−0.6 (30.9)	1.7 (35.1)	4 (39)	4.4 (39.9)	0.6 (33.1)	−9 (16)	−19 (−2)	−21.7 (−7.1)	−21.7 (−7.1)
Average precipitation mm (inches)	189.6 (7.46)	150.9 (5.94)	142.1 (5.59)	108.5 (4.27)	102.8 (4.05)	92.7 (3.65)	67.9 (2.67)	50.2 (1.98)	94.3 (3.71)	143.7 (5.66)	196.9 (7.75)	221.7 (8.73)	1,561.1 (61.46)
Source: Environment Canada
