= Pattullo Bridge =

Bridge in New Westminster and Surrey, British Columbia

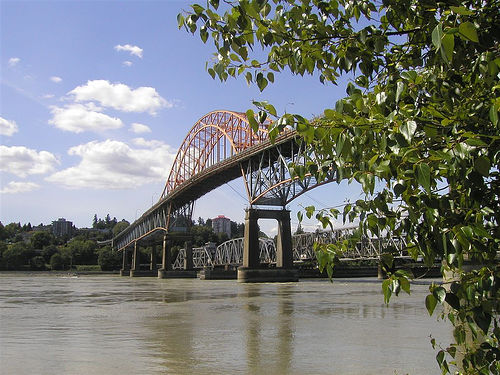
- Pattullo Bridge in 2003
- Coordinates: 49.207575°N 122.894654°W
- Carries: Four lanes of British Columbia Highway 1A/99A, pedestrians and bicycles
- Crosses: Fraser River
- Locale: New Westminster; Surrey
- Owner: TransLink

Characteristics
- Design: Through arch bridge
- Total length: 1,227 metres (4,026 ft)

History
- Opened: November 15, 1937; 88 years ago
- Closed: February 6, 2026; 8 months ago

Statistics
- Daily traffic: 75,700 (2013)

Location
- Interactive map of Pattullo Bridge

The Pattullo Bridge was a through arch bridge that crossed the Fraser River and linked the cities of New Westminster and Surrey in Metro Vancouver, British Columbia. It was named in honour of Thomas Dufferin Pattullo, the 22nd premier of British Columbia.

It was a key link between Surrey and the rest of Greater Vancouver; the bridge handled an average of 75,700 cars and 3840 trucks daily, or roughly 20% of vehicle traffic across the Fraser River in 2013. Construction on a replacement bridge, the stal̕əw̓asəm Bridge, began in 2021 and was completed in 2026.

== Design and layout ==
The Pattullo Bridge was 1,227 metres (4,026 ft) in total length and consisted of four lanes, with two in each direction. The bridge had a line of plastic pillars for its central median, installed by TransLink to raise the visibility of the centre-lane divider. However, the lack of a concrete median barrier made the causeway highly prone to head-on collisions, especially at excessive speed or in bad weather. The narrow traffic lanes and lack of a reliable centre divider had led to lane closures from 10:00 p.m. to 5:00 a.m. for safety.

In response to the high number of crashes on the bridge, TransLink studied the idea of reducing the number of lanes on the bridge from four to three using a counterflow operation, similar to that used on the Lions' Gate Bridge, with the number of lanes varied depending on traffic flow and volume. However, traffic analysis showed that significant congestion would result in Surrey and New Westminster, and the idea was abandoned. TransLink also examined a number of options to install a centre-line barrier and, in concert, to ban truck traffic from the bridge because the barrier would further narrow the traffic lanes, but that too was proven impractical. A more controversial proposal was to install photo radar on the bridge to enforce the existing speed limit. Thus far, the provincial government has ruled out the idea of bringing back photo radar, which it eliminated province-wide in 2001.

Oversized commercial vehicles were prohibited from using the bridge, as mandated by the British Columbia Commercial Vehicle Safety and Enforcement agency.

== History ==
The first regular crossing of the Fraser River started in 1882, and was operated by a steam ferry named K de K, which transported residents and livestock from Brownsville to New Westminster. During the late 1890s, the need for a new bridge became apparent after the existing ferry was deemed insufficient to handle future traffic demands. The first bridge, a combined steel two deck road and rail span, started construction in 1902, with completion in 1904. The bridge was built with two decks, the upper deck handling vehicular traffic and the lower deck functioning as a railway bridge.

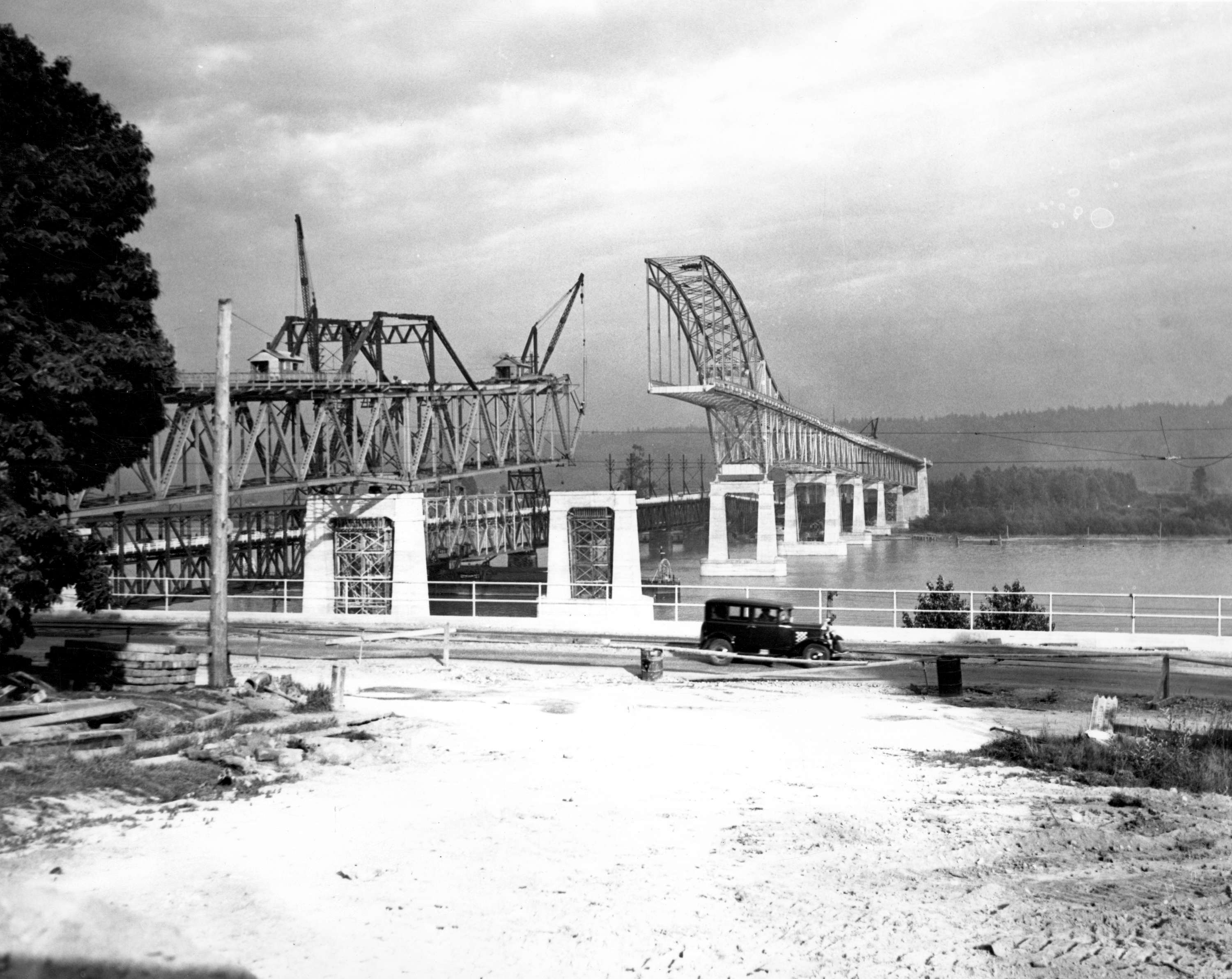
Under construction, 1937

Again, growing traffic demands prompted the construction of a second bridge in 1936. The bridge was designed by supervising engineer Major W.G. Swan, and construction was tendered to the Dominion Bridge Company and Northern Construction & J.W. Stewart Ltd. The Pattullo Bridge was opened to traffic on November 15, 1937, by Premier "Duff" Pattullo, with a total cost of $4 million. The bridge was originally tolled at 25¢ per crossing, but was then removed in 1952. The old bridge, now known as the New Westminster Rail Bridge was converted to rail use only, and highway traffic was moved to the Pattullo Bridge.

Around 3 a.m. on January 18, 2009, a fire started on the south end of the bridge in the structure under the bridge deck. The 60-foot (18 m)-long wooden trestle on the south side of the bridge connecting the steel and concrete structure to the earthen berm sustained damage, and had to be completely rebuilt. Initially, it was estimated that the bridge would be closed for 4–6 weeks. However, by reusing a temporary bridge structure used on the Canada Line project, the bridge was reopened on Monday, January 26.

== Closure and replacement ==
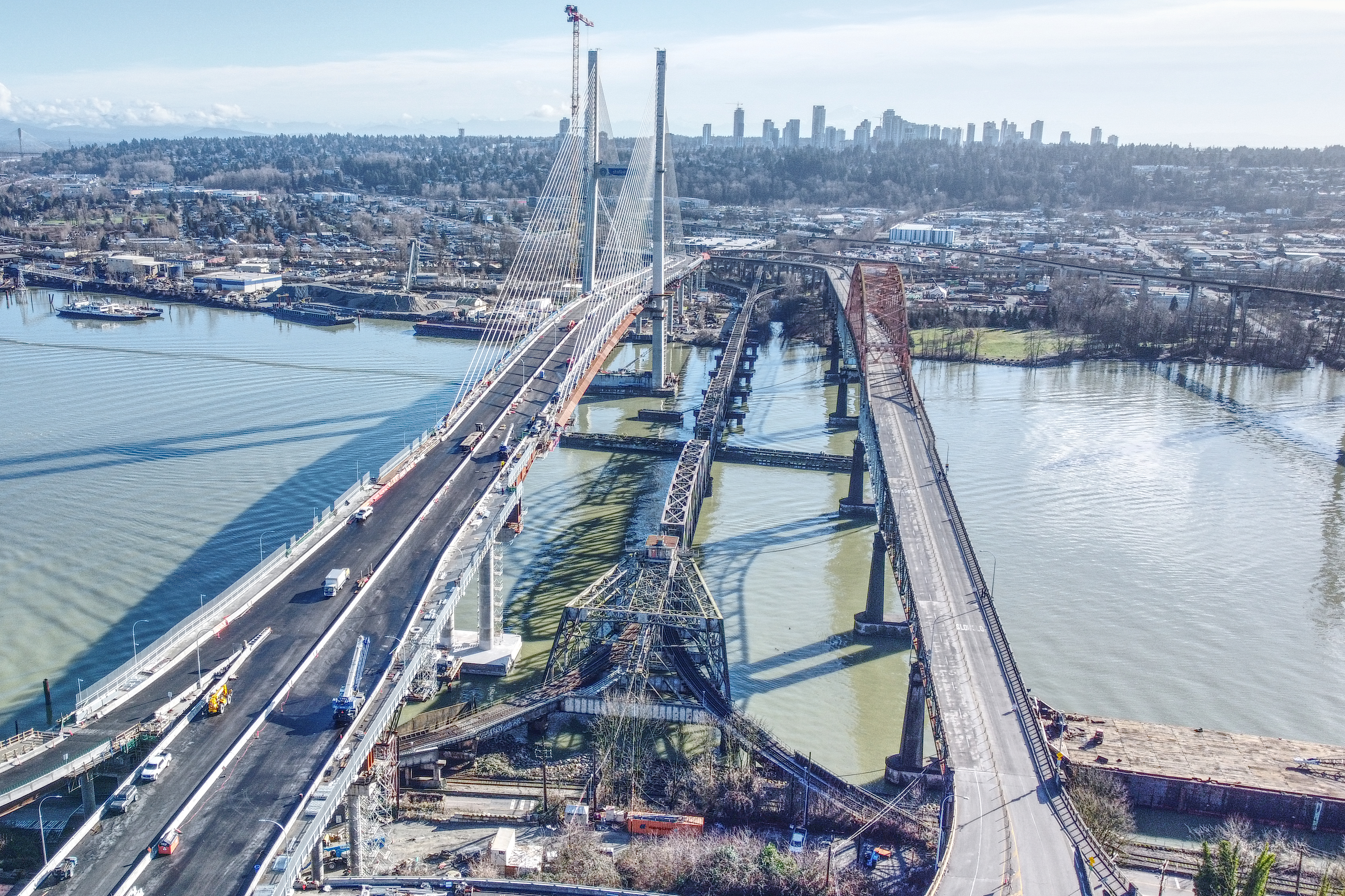
Pattullo Bridge (right) and the replacement bridge (left) closed to traffic in February 2026

The through arch was removed from the structure in October 2026.

The Pattullo Bridge had a number of issues, including not being seismically sound, having narrow lanes, and lacking barriers separating opposing traffic or pedestrians and cyclists. This created the need for a replacement.

On July 31, 2008, TransLink opted to replace the Pattullo Bridge as a new tolled bridge rather than refurbish the aging structure. The Metro Vancouver Mayors' Council came to the same conclusion in June 2014, determining that the existing Pattullo Bridge would be demolished and replaced with a new, four-lane, tolled replacement bridge.

During 2016, rehabilitation work was completed on the bridge deck to keep the bridge operational until the replacement is built. From May 2 to August 26, the bridge was reduced to one lane of traffic in each direction, with full bridge closures on selected days. The bridge reopened one month ahead of schedule, on August 29.

The stal̕əw̓asəm Bridge fully opened in January 2026 and the Pattullo Bridge permanently closed to vehicular traffic on February 6, 2026. The Pattullo Bridge remained open to pedestrians and cyclists until February 16.

Demolition of the Pattullo Bridge began in late February 2026 and was estimated to take two years to complete. On October 11, 2026, the through arch was removed and lowered onto barges.

== See also ==
- List of crossings of the Fraser River
- List of bridges in Canada
