= British Columbia Highway 7 =

Highway in British Columbia

Highway 7
- Lougheed Highway; Broadway; Haney Bypass
- Highway 7 highlighted in red

Route information
- Maintained by the Ministry of Transportation and Infrastructure
- Length: 150 km (93 mi)
- Existed: 1941–present

Major junctions
- West end: Highway 99 (Granville Street) in Vancouver
- Highway 1 (TCH) in Coquitlam; Highway 7B in Port Coquitlam; Golden Ears Way in Maple Ridge; Highway 11 in Mission; Highway 9 in Kent
- East end: Highway 1 (TCH) near Hope

Location
- Country: Canada
- Province: British Columbia
- Regional districts: Mission, Kent, Hope
- Major cities: Vancouver, Burnaby, Coquitlam, Port Coquitlam, Pitt Meadows, Maple Ridge

Highway system
- British Columbia provincial highways
← Highway 6	→ Highway 7B

Highway 7, known for most of its length as the Lougheed Highway and Broadway, is an alternative route to Highway 1 through the Lower Mainland region of British Columbia. Whereas the controlled-access Highway 1 follows the southern bank of the Fraser River, Highway 7 follows the northern bank.

Highway 7 was first commissioned in 1941, and originally went from Vancouver to Harrison Hot Springs; between Port Moody and Port Coquitlam it followed the then existing Dewdney Trunk Road. In 1953, Highway 7 between Vancouver and Coquitlam was moved to its current alignment. Its eastern end was moved south from Harrison Hot Springs to Agassiz in 1956, and then east to Ruby Creek in 1968. In September 1972, the eastern end of Highway 7 was extended to include a junction with Highway 1 just north of Hope.

The name of the highway, unlike that of Alberta Premier Peter Lougheed, is pronounced /ˈloʊhiːd/. The highway is named after Nelson Seymour Lougheed, MLA for the Dewdney District and the BC Minister of Public Works (1928–1929), who ran a logging company in the area.

== Route details ==
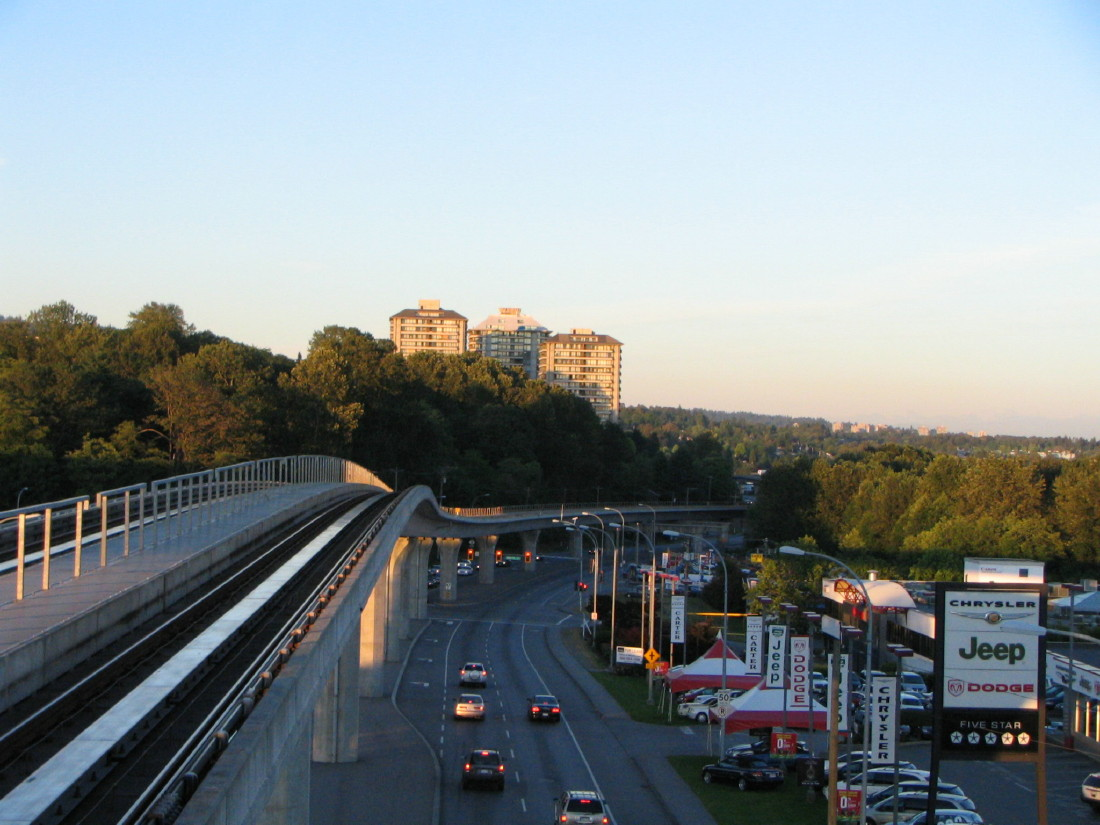
The Lougheed Highway just east of Brentwood Town Centre SkyTrain station in Burnaby

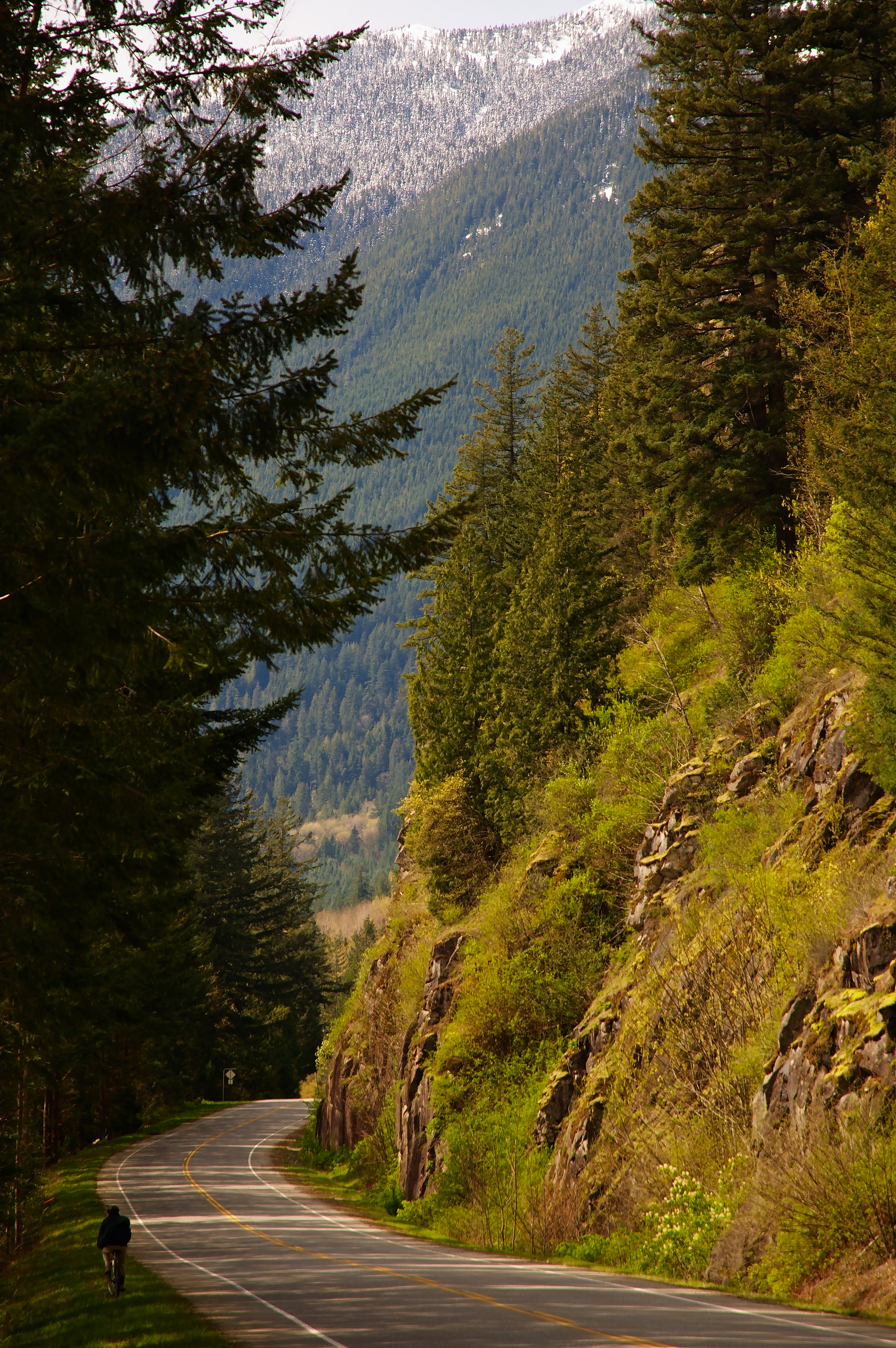
Highway 7 near Harrison Mills

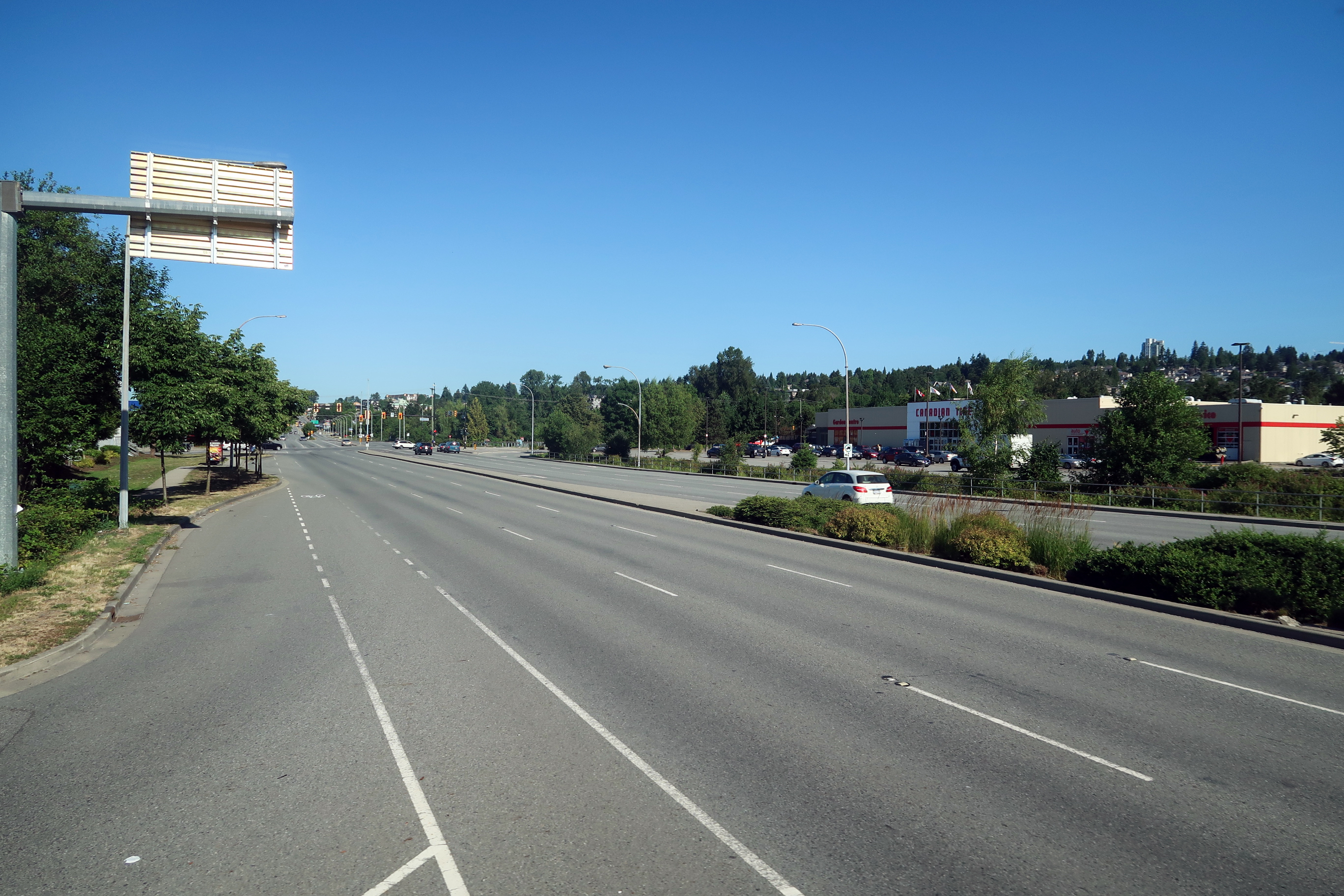
Lougheed Highway near Coquitlam in 2018

Highway 7's total length under the jurisdiction of the British Columbia Ministry of Transportation (MOT) is 118 km (73 mi). Highway 7 is signed as far west as Granville Street on Broadway in Vancouver, all the way east through Burnaby into Coquitlam, which is under the jurisdiction of the South Coast British Columbia Transportation Authority (TransLink). The section under the MOT's jurisdiction begins at the westbound exit with Highway 1 near Schoolhouse Street, with a total length of 2.3 km (1.4 mi). The highway then turns immediately northeast, meets with Highway 1 at the Cape Horn Interchange, and has an exit with United Boulevard. The highway leaves the MOT's jurisdiction 300 m (980 ft) after the interchange. TransLink again has jurisdiction of Highway 7 from the point east of Ottawa Street to the point east of United Boulevard.

Highway 7 falls under the MOT's jurisdiction again after Ottawa Street, crossing over the Pitt River Bridge into Pitt Meadows. 6 km (3.7 mi) southeast of the Pitt River bridge, it crosses into Maple Ridge at Maple Meadows Way, and the highway then crosses into Mission another 20 km (12 mi) east. 9 km (5.6 mi) of Highway 7's entry into Mission, it meets a junction with Highway 11. 8 km (5.0 mi) east of the Highway 11 junction, Highway 7 leaves Mission over the Hatzic Pump Bridge.

27 km (17 mi) east of the Highway's eastern exit from Mission, Highway 7 enters the Municipality of Kent. 14 km (8.7 mi) east, it reaches a junction with Highway 9 at Agassiz. 18 km (11 mi) northeast of the Highway 9 junction, it leaves Kent. Another 12 km (7.5 mi) northeast, Highway 7 finally reaches its eastern terminus at a junction with Highway 1 at Haig, just across the Fraser River from the main part of Hope.

== History ==
Lougheed Highway as it exists today is the direct successor to the Dewdney Trunk Road, which was completed around 1900. In fact, portions of the Trunk Road were incorporated into the Lougheed Highway. A subsidized ferry service across the Pitt River was instigated on September 27, 1902, and was replaced in March 1915 by the first Pitt River Bridge. In the mid-1920s, the section from Harrison Mills to Agassiz over Woodside Mountain was built, being completed by the end of the 1926/27 fiscal year. This also included a bridge over the Harrison River. Around 1929, portions of the highway which followed Nicomen Slough were relocated.

From 1928 to 1931, contractors and the Public Works Department built in sections what is now the present alignment of Lougheed Highway from the Pitt River Bridge through to Mission. The route followed the already existing powerlines in Pitt Meadows, went through Haney, continued in the vicinity of the already existing River Road, and then followed the Fraser River to Mission. Ideas for a highway connecting Haney to Mission the via the path the Lougheed takes today can be traced back at least to 1919. Around the time of the construction of today's Lougheed through Pitt Meadows and Maple Ridge, construction of what was then called the "Central Arterial Highway" started through Burnaby. The provincial government however, failed to complete the entire projected road and it wouldn't be until 1946 that the effort to build the road recommenced. The missing link in the road from what is now Lakeside Drive to Blue Mountain St. and Brunette Avenue was completed by June 1948.

On August 14, 1950, the present truss bridge that carries eastbound traffic over the Coquitlam River was officially opened by Roderick Charles MacDonald. The bridge is referred to as the Coquitlam River Bridge and the construction of a potential replacement for the aging span is an ongoing discussion in municipal, provincial, and federal politics.

In September 1954, the section of Lougheed through the flats south of Maillardville and around Cape Horn was opened in a two-lane configuration. Previously, the highway followed streets that now make up both Brunette and Cape Horn Avenues.

In 1957 several bridges including the first Pitt River Bridge and the bridge at Harrison Mills were replaced. W. A. C. Bennett opened the new Pitt River and Harrison River Bridges on October 21. Around that time via the Mt. Woodside section was improved significantly. Work on the Agassiz-Haig Highway was also sought over. Around 1958, the highway was widened to four lanes from Boundary Road to North Road, entirely in Burnaby.

In the 1970s, several sections of the highway were widened from Coquitlam to Maple Ridge. In 1971 or early 1972, work to widen the highway to four lanes from Cape Horn to Pitt River Road was completed. The Agassiz-Haig section of the highway was finally opened in September 1972 after many years of construction and want. By early 1973 the segment from the Pitt River Bridge to Haney had also been widened to a four-lane standard.

From about 1953 and up until 1975, Highway 7 followed Westwood Street from today's Orchid Street intersection, over the now-gone Scott Creek bridge and along Coquitlam/Port Coquitlam border to the intersection with Barnet Highway. This portion was replaced by the Sharpe Street Extension which completed and opened on September 5, 1975.

In 1981 work to widen the North Road to Cape Horn Interchange section was completed. Work on widening of the section of highway from Haney to Albion was being done during the early to mid-eighties.

Through the 1990s, efforts were made to widen the highway from Albion to Mission. In 1991 and 1992, the section between Highway 11 and Grant Street was widened to four lanes for $4,571,000. In 1992 and 1993, the highway was widened to four lanes from the western boundary of Langley I.R. 5 to Whonnock for $12.7 million

In 1999, portions of Highway 7 and a former alignment were devolved to the municipalities of Burnaby, (Note: All portions.) Coquitlam, (Note: All segments with the exception of the portion from Coleman Avenue to Colony Farm Road.) Port Coquitlam, (Note: All portions except from east of Ottawa Street to the Pitt Meadows border.) and Maple Ridge. (Note: The Lougheed highway bypassed by the Haney Bypass (i.e. the original highway section from 222 St. to Kanaka Way))

Around 2001, work to widen Lougheed highway from Brunette Avenue to Schoolhouse Street in Coquitlam to a six-lane cross section was completed. From October 2004 to about November 2005 the section from 285 Street to Mclean Street in Silverdale was widened to four lanes. In 2011, widening of the highway to four lanes from Wren street to Nelson street was completed.

From May 2018 to July 2020, work was underway to widen the portion of highway between Nelson Street and the Silverdale area in Mission. The project was completed successfully. As of 2022, only one section remains to be widened to four lanes from Vancouver to Mission. This section, from 266 St. to 287 St. is, as of December 2022, under construction.

=== 2021 floods ===
On November 14, 2021, the province experienced extreme rainfall events that led to debris flows and flooding. As a result, two mudslides occurred late that evening near Seabird Island on the Agassiz-Haig section of the highway, trapping nearly 100 vehicles between the two slides. The next day, Canadian military personnel used helicopters to safely transport over 300 people to Agassiz.

== Major intersections ==
From west to east:

Regional District	Location	km	mi	Destinations	Notes
Metro Vancouver	Vancouver	0.00	0.00	Broadway Granville Street (Highway 99) – City Centre, Whistler, Airport (YVR), USA Border	South Granville station (under construction); Highway 7 western terminus; Broadway continues west
Metro Vancouver	Vancouver	0.85	0.53	Oak Street	Near Oak–VGH station (under construction); alternate route to Highway 99 south
Metro Vancouver	Vancouver	1.70	1.06	Cambie Street – City Centre	Broadway–City Hall station (Millennium Line connection under construction)
Metro Vancouver	Vancouver	2.70	1.68	Main Street – City Centre	Mount Pleasant station (under construction)
Metro Vancouver	Vancouver	2.80	1.74	Kingsway	Former Highway 1A / Highway 99A
Metro Vancouver	Vancouver	4.40	2.73	Clark Drive	
Metro Vancouver	Vancouver	5.00	3.11	Commercial Drive	Commercial–Broadway station
Metro Vancouver	Vancouver	6.90	4.29	Renfrew Street	Near Renfrew station
Metro Vancouver	Vancouver	7.60	4.72	Rupert Street	Rupert station; eastern terminus of Broadway; Highway 7 becomes Lougheed Highway
Metro Vancouver	Vancouver–Burnaby boundary	8.50	5.28	Boundary Road	
Metro Vancouver	Burnaby	10.00	6.21	Willingdon Avenue	Brentwood Town Centre station
Metro Vancouver	Burnaby	11.60	7.21	Holdom Avenue	Holdom station
Metro Vancouver	Burnaby	12.70	7.89	Kensington Avenue	Grade separated; eastbound exit and entrance
Metro Vancouver	Burnaby	12.90	8.02	Sperling Avenue	Sperling–Burnaby Lake station; access to Winston Street and Kensington Avenue
Metro Vancouver	Burnaby	15.00	9.32	Lake City Way	Lake City Way station
Metro Vancouver	Burnaby	16.40	10.19	Production Way, Brighton Avenue	Production Way–University station
Metro Vancouver	Burnaby	16.90	10.50	Gaglardi Way – Simon Fraser University	
Metro Vancouver	Burnaby	18.00	11.18	Government Street, Austin Avenue	Lougheed Town Centre station
Metro Vancouver	Burnaby–Coquitlam boundary	18.50	11.50	North Road – New Westminster, Pattullo Bridge	
Metro Vancouver	Coquitlam	20.20– 20.30	12.55– 12.61	Blue Mountain Street, Brunette Avenue – New Westminster, Pattullo Bridge	
Metro Vancouver	Coquitlam	22.00– 24.80	13.67– 15.41	Highway 1 (TCH) – Vancouver, Port Mann Bridge, Surrey, Hope; Highway 7B east (Mary Hill Bypass) / United Boulevard – Maple Ridge	Cape Horn Interchange; no access from Highway 7 east to Highway 1 west; Highway 7 turns north
Metro Vancouver	Coquitlam	29.60	18.39	Barnet Highway / Pinetree Way	Highway 7 branches east; former Highway 7A west; near Coquitlam Central station
Metro Vancouver	Coquitlam–Port Coquitlam boundary	30.20	18.77	Westwood Street	
Metro Vancouver	Port Coquitlam	31.40	19.51	Shaughnessy Street	Access to Port Coquitlam station
Metro Vancouver	Port Coquitlam	33.10	20.57	Coast Meridian Road	Partially grade separated
Metro Vancouver	Port Coquitlam	33.80	21.00	Ottawa Street	
Metro Vancouver	Port Coquitlam	33.80	21.00	East end of TransLink jurisdiction	
Metro Vancouver	Port Coquitlam	34.80	21.62	Highway 7B west (Mary Hill Bypass) to Highway 1 (TCH) – Vancouver	Interchange
Metro Vancouver	Port Coquitlam–Pitt Meadows boundary	35.14– 35.66	21.83– 22.16	Pitt River Bridge crosses the Pitt River	
Metro Vancouver	Pitt Meadows	36.28	22.54	Old Dewdney Trunk Road, Kennedy Road	
Metro Vancouver	Pitt Meadows	38.84	24.13	Harris Road	Access to Pitt Meadows station
Metro Vancouver	Pitt Meadows	40.56	25.20	Golden Ears Way (Highway 916) to Highway 1 (TCH) – Golden Ears Bridge, Langley, Surrey	Partially grade separated
Metro Vancouver	Maple Ridge	40.99	25.47	Dewdney Trunk Road, Maple Meadows Way	Entrance from Golden Ears Way north; access to Maple Meadows station
Metro Vancouver	Maple Ridge	45.22	28.10	222 Street, Haney Bypass / Lougheed Highway	Highway 7 follows Haney Bypass
Metro Vancouver	Maple Ridge	45.67	28.38	223 Street, Callaghan Avenue (to 224 Street)	Near Port Haney station
Metro Vancouver	Maple Ridge	47.78	29.69	Lougheed Highway / Kanaka Way	Highway 7 returns to Lougheed Highway
Fraser Valley	Mission	69.46	43.16	Highway 11 south to Highway 1 (TCH) / Cedar Valley Connector – Abbotsford	Highway 11 northern terminus
Fraser Valley	Mission	70.51	43.81	West end of one-way road pair; eastbound follows North Railway Avenue; westbound follows 1st Avenue	
Fraser Valley	Mission	71.21	44.25	Horne Street	Eastbound access to Horne Street Connector; near Mission City station; parallel roads each become two-way traffic
Fraser Valley	Mission	71.34	44.33	Glasgow Avenue (Highway 901:0670 / Highway 901:0671) to Highway 11 south / Murray Street – Abbotsford	Connects to Horne Street Connector; no direct eastbound access
Fraser Valley	Mission	72.64	45.14	East end of road pair; becomes Lougheed Highway	
Fraser Valley	Kent	103.90	64.56	Harrison River Bridge crosses the Harrison River	
Fraser Valley	Kent	118.42	73.58	Highway 9 north / Else Road – Harrison Hot Springs	West end of Highway 9 concurrency
Fraser Valley	Kent	120.01	74.57	Highway 9 south – Agassiz, Chilliwack	East end of Highway 9 concurrency
Fraser Valley	Kent	121.61	75.56	Agassiz Bypass (Highway 901:2752) to Highway 9 south / Highway 1 (TCH) – Chilliwack, Vancouver	Agassiz Interchange; westbound exit and eastbound entrance
Fraser Valley	Hope	150.44	93.48	Highway 1 (TCH) to Highway 3 / Highway 5 – Hope, Cache Creek, Princeton, Merritt	Haig Interchange; Highway 7 eastern terminus
1.000 mi = 1.609 km; 1.000 km = 0.621 mi: Concurrency terminus; Incomplete access; Route transition
