= British Columbia Highway 7B =

Highway in British Columbia

Highway 7B
- Mary Hill Bypass
- Highway 7B highlighted in red

Route information
- Maintained by the Ministry of Transportation and Infrastructure
- Length: 7.27 km (4.52 mi)
- Existed: 1996–present

Major junctions
- West end: Highway 1 (TCH) / Highway 7 in Coquitlam
- East end: Highway 7 in Port Coquitlam

Location
- Country: Canada
- Province: British Columbia
- Major cities: Coquitlam, Port Coquitlam

Highway system
- British Columbia provincial highways
← Highway 7	→ Highway 8

Highway 7B, known as the Mary Hill Bypass, is a 7.27-kilometre (4.52 mi) long riverside east-west link between the cities of Coquitlam to the west and Port Coquitlam to the east. The Mary Hill Bypass gained its numbered designation in 1996, when it was widened from two to four lanes north of Broadway. Highway 7B meets Highway 7 at both of its ends, and also links to Highway 1 within Coquitlam at the Cape Horn Interchange.

== Route description ==
The Mary Hill Bypass begins at an intersection with United Boulevard in Coquitlam. Just west of this intersection are the ramps that connect Highway 1 and Highway 7 (westbound only) within the Cape Horn Interchange. Highway 1 and Highway 7 eastbound can be accessed via United Boulevard. After crossing the Coquitlam River, the highway continues on, turning east and passing through a major intersection which provides access to downtown Port Coquitlam. Continuing northeast, the Mary Hill Bypass passes through another major intersection, then enters an industrial park and passes through another three intersections. After passing a railway underpass and one final intersection, the Mary Hill Bypass ends at Highway 7, which continues east to Pitt Meadows, Maple Ridge, and Mission.

== History ==
The Mary Hill Bypass skirts around Mary Hill, which was developed in the early 1960s for residential housing. The highway itself was built in the mid-eighties and was officially opened to traffic on 19 December 1985. It cost about $26 million CAD (equivalent to $62.32 million in 2022). In the mid-1990s, the Bypass saw major improvements north of Broadway. This included four-laning the existing two lane section and a new railway overpass. The widened highway was opened by Premier Glen Clark on 24 October 1996. The intersection with Lougheed Highway was replaced by an interchange in 2009 as a part of the Pitt River Bridge replacement project.

With the discontinuation of route 7A in 1999 highway 7 is the only highway system in BC to have a "B" route but no official "A" route.

== Related routes ==
=== North Fraser Perimeter Road ===
As part of the Ministry of Transportation's Metro Vancouver Gateway Program, improvements to existing roads around the north side of the Fraser River between the Queensborough Bridge in New Westminster and the Golden Ears Bridge in Maple Ridge. This project was known as the North Fraser Perimeter Road, including the upgrading of intersections and possible interchanges along the Mary Hill Bypass and construction of the new, cable-stayed Pitt River Bridge. While the new Pitt River Bridge was constructed, the remainder of the North Fraser Perimeter Road was cancelled.

=== United Boulevard ===
United Boulevard is a major roadway in Coquitlam used as connection between Highway 7B and Highways 1 and 7. A 1.3 km (0.8 mi) segment is provincially maintained as part of Highway 7B; however, the section is unsigned and the western terminus of Highway 7B is signed as being at the Mary Hill Bypass / United Boulevard interchange.

== Major intersections ==
From west to east; list excludes United Boulevard. The entire route is in Metro Vancouver Regional District.

Location	km	mi	Destinations	Notes
Coquitlam	0.00	0.00	Highway 1 (TCH) west / Highway 7 west (Lougheed Highway) / United Boulevard – Coquitlam City Centre, Hope (via Port Mann Bridge), Vancouver	Cape Horn Interchange
Port Coquitlam	1.90	1.18	Shaughnessy Street	
Port Coquitlam	4.10	2.55	Pitt River Road	
Port Coquitlam	5.03	3.13	Broadway Street	
Port Coquitlam	5.57	3.46	Coast Meridian Road	
Port Coquitlam	6.24	3.88	Kingsway Avenue	
Port Coquitlam	7.27	4.52	Highway 7 (Lougheed Highway) – Coquitlam, Maple Ridge (via Pitt River Bridge)	Interchange
1.000 mi = 1.609 km; 1.000 km = 0.621 mi
