= Gateway Program (Vancouver) =

Regional transportation project

A map of the Gateway Program's projects

The Gateway Program was a CA$3.0 billion regional transportation project for Metro Vancouver and surrounding areas that was managed by the British Columbia Ministry of Transportation. The ministry introduced the Gateway Program on January 31, 2006, as a means to address growing congestion and reduce travel times. The bulk of the construction took place from 2006 to 2014 and saw the completion of the Pitt River Bridge, the Port Mann Bridge, improvements to Highway 1 and construction of the South Fraser Perimeter Road.

== Highway 1 and Port Mann Bridge ==
The Port Mann / Highway 1 (PMH1) Project included the widening of Highway 1, a new Port Mann Bridge, and upgrades to interchanges on British Columbia Highway 1 in order to address congestion through this corridor.

When the bridge was built, there was also significant remodelling of the Cape Horn interchange.

The Port Mann Bridge was replaced with a new 10-lane tolled bridge. On September 1, 2017, the toll was removed.

The project also featured rapid bus lanes. This included transit priority access to Highway 1, park-and-ride facilities, new transit loops in Surrey and Langley, and 20 new buses.

The bridge was to include separated pedestrian and cycling lanes and was also designed to accommodate the eventual addition of light rail transit underneath the bridge.

The project included widening Highway 1 between McGill Street in Vancouver and 216 Street in Langley. The pre-design concept included one additional lane in each direction between the Port Mann Bridge and McGill Street. The bridge itself featured five new lanes, two reserved for high-occupancy vehicles and commercial vehicles. On the Surrey side, four additional lanes were built from the bridge to 200 Street, allowing for an HOV and general lane in each direction. Finally, there was one additional lane in each direction on the section from 200 to 216 Streets.

There was a plan in the early 2010s to build a new road to extend United Boulevard westward from Coquitlam, over the railway tracks to meet Brunette Avenue just south of the Braid / Brunette intersection to improve traffic flow. Local opposition to this idea had the plan abandoned.

Interchanges from Vancouver to Langley were also upgraded to increase interchange capacity and improve safety.

The majority of these changes occurred within the existing right of way of Highway 1. The PMH1 project was completed in September 2015.

== South Fraser Perimeter Road ==
The South Fraser Perimeter Road (SFPR), a four-lane, 80-kilometre-per-hour (50 mph) highway along the south side of the Fraser River, extends from Highway 17 in southwest Delta to 176 Street in Surrey, with connections to Highways 1, 91, and 99 and to TransLink's new Golden Ears Bridge connector. The SFPR provided a new east–west transportation corridor that connects to the Roberts Bank Superport. The stated goal was to reduce the volume of regional truck traffic on local roads and reduce idling on local roads.

The Burns Bog Conservation Society expressed concerns that the South Fraser Perimeter Road would endanger Burns Bog. Attempts to mitigate these impacts were made through refinements that occurred as a result of public consultation and the Environmental Assessment process. In response to the mitigation measures proposed, the Environmental Stewardship Branch of Environment Canada wrote that "the changes are not sufficient to alleviate its concerns related to the impacts of the Project on Pacific Water Shrew (PWS), hydrology, aerial deposition, and ecological integrity of Burns Bog".

The Gateway Program said that it was committed to protecting and supporting the restoration of Burns Bog. The SFPR project worked with the Burns Bog Scientific Advisory Panel to develop systems that would improve the existing drainage and hydrology of the bog. Although the SFPR alignment does not pass through the Burns Bog Ecological Conservancy Area, there was concern that it would affect the surrounding hydrology and have an adverse effect on the conservancy area.

It was estimated that over 90 hectares (220 acres) of farmland would also be lost to the project. Concerns were also expressed about pollution near residential neighbourhoods and schools.

The Wilderness Committee and other groups criticized the SFPR, and the Gateway Program in general, for increasing greenhouse gas emissions. In the second quarter of 2011, a protest camp organized by StopThePave.org and the Council of Canadians occupied a SFPR construction site for almost two weeks.

The SFPR was completed and opened to traffic on December 21, 2013, and cost CA$1.26 billion.

== North Fraser Perimeter Road ==
The North Fraser Perimeter Road (NFPR) was promoted as a way to provide a continuous route on the north side of the Fraser River from New Westminster to Maple Ridge. TransLink is responsible for the section between the Queensborough Bridge and the border of Coquitlam. In 2009, the Queensborough Bridge had its approach around Marine Way / Stewardson Way modified.

The Gateway portion of this route was to originate from the Bailey bridge across the Brunette River. The one-lane wooden bridge was to be replaced with a new four-lane crossing. The route follows United Boulevard and turns onto the Mary Hill Bypass. East of the new bridge, Lougheed Highway continues east through Pitt Meadows and Maple Ridge. The intersection at Harris Road was to be converted to a full interchange.

While there were initially some plans for the North Fraser route to be built to expressway standards, local opposition from New Westminster caused those plans to be rescinded. The plan was for a fast route from the Queensborough bridge along the water through New Westminster and finally into Coquitlam by the Trans Canada Highway. After this surface route plan was rejected, a new plan suggested tunnel connections through New Westminster.

This was called the Stormont–McBride Connector, and it was planned to go Highway 1's Gaglardi Way interchange and the northern foot of McBride Boulevard at 10th Avenue. The plan was to have a high speed connection from the north end of the Pattullo Bridge to Highway 1 going through New Westminster, with much of the route as an underground tunnel. This plan was rejected as well, in 2020, by Burnaby city council out of concerns that it would cause induced demand in the region.

=== Pitt River Bridge and Mary Hill Interchange ===
The new Pitt River Bridge is a seven-lane cable-stayed bridge that carries the Lougheed Highway over the Pitt River; it was built between the two swing bridges that previously performed this duty. A new interchange replaced the at-grade intersection of the Lougheed Highway and the Mary Hill Bypass.

The old swing bridges previously accommodated four lanes of traffic, two on each bridge, with a counterflow system for peak hours. The new bridge carries three lanes of general-purpose traffic in each direction, as well as one eastbound lane for slower-moving trucks accessing the Canadian Pacific intermodal yard at Kennedy Road.

The new bridge also includes separate pedestrian and cycling walkways. The new bridge was designed to accommodate the addition of light rapid transit.

The project was funded by the federal and provincial governments. As part of its Asia–Pacific Gateway and Corridor Initiative, the Government of Canada committed $90 million to the construction of the new bridge and interchange; the province provided $108 million.

The new bridge and interchange were substantially completed by the end of 2009 to coincide with the opening of the Golden Ears Bridge.

== Criticism ==
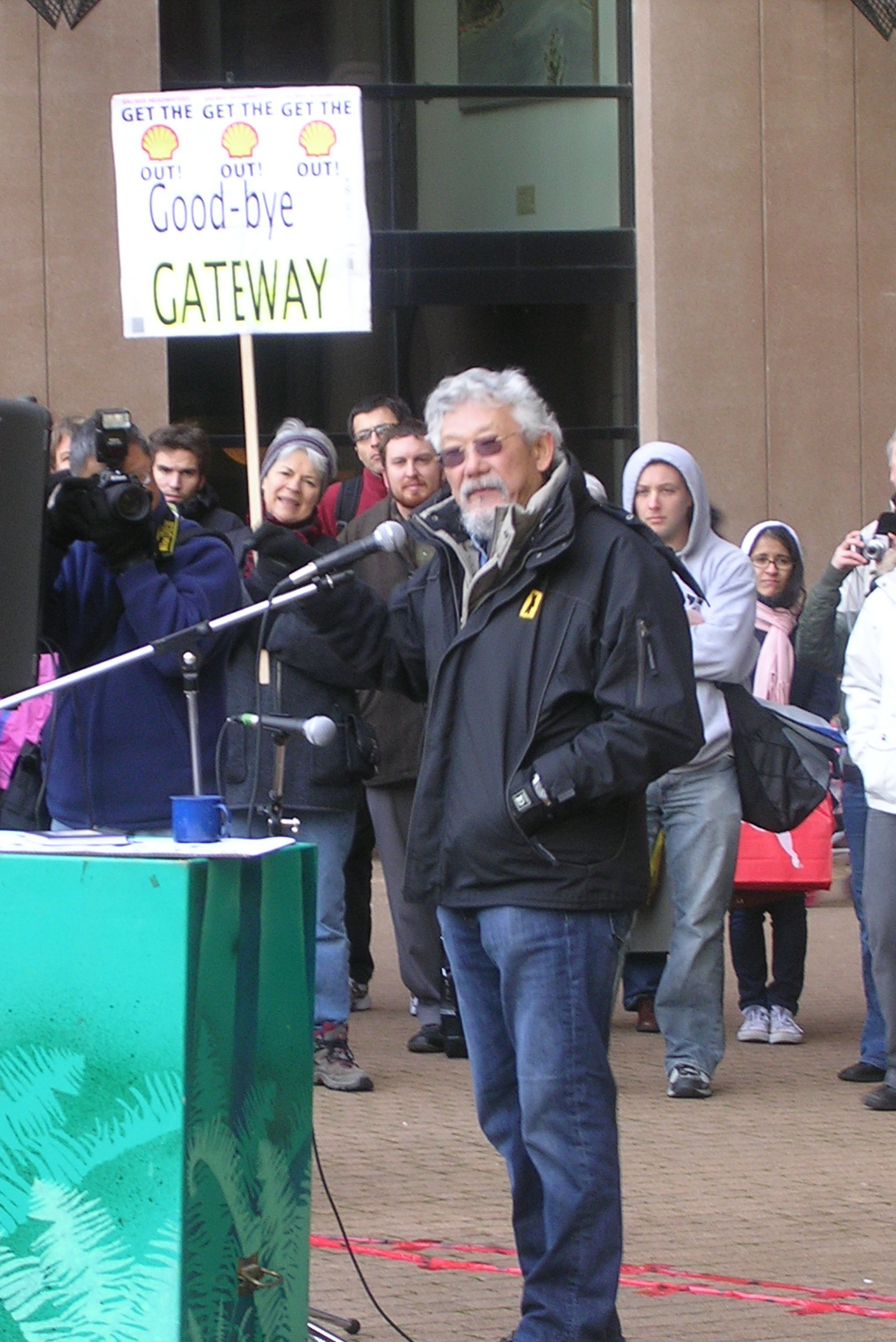
David Suzuki speaks at the Global Day of Action on Climate Change in Vancouver.

Burnaby city council, Vancouver city council, and directors of the GVRD (now Metro Vancouver) passed resolutions opposing the Highway 1 portion of the project.

Groups opposing the program included the Livable Region Coalition, a group based south of the Fraser called the Gateway 40 Network, a group of urban planners, the Society Promoting Environmental Conservation (SPEC), the Burns Bog Conservation Society, Sunbury Neighbourhood Association, South Fraser Action Networks, Bridgeview Community Action Group, Gateway Sucks, the Council of Canadians, and the Western Canada Wilderness Committee. These groups argued that increasing the highway's capacity would only increase traffic over the span and encourage suburban sprawl. The Livable Region Coalition urged the former minister of Transportation, Kevin Falcon, to consider more viable solutions to reducing congestion, including more rapid transit and improved bus routes.

The David Suzuki Foundation claimed the project violated the goals of the Livable Region Strategic Plan and did not consider alternative forms of transportation.

The provincial government studies, conducted as part of the environmental assessment process, projected an increase of 176,000 tonnes per year in greenhouse gas emissions. An analysis by SPEC found that these studies included emissions in Whatcom County, Washington, when calculating the baseline and left them out when calculating the impact of Gateway. When this is factored in, the studies predict a 31% increase in road emissions.

Groups supporting the project included Get Moving BC and the BC Truckers Association.

== See also ==
- Golden Ears Bridge
