= Golden Ears Way =

Road in Vancouver

- Unsigned Highway 916
- Golden Ears Way highlighted in red.

Route information
- Maintained by TransLink
- Length: 12.6 km (7.8 mi)
- Existed: 2009–present

Major junctions
- West end: Highway 15 in Surrey
- Highway 7 in Pitt Meadows / Maple Ridge
- East end: 210th Street in Maple Ridge

Location
- Country: Canada
- Province: British Columbia
- Major cities: Surrey, Langley, Pitt Meadows, Maple Ridge

Highway system
- British Columbia provincial highways
← Highway 395	→ Highway 1

Golden Ears Way is a two-to-six lane road in Greater Vancouver, British Columbia. It connects Maple Ridge and Pitt Meadows to Langley and Surrey via the Golden Ears Bridge. It is designed to keep traffic movements to and from the Golden Ears Bridge simple and streamlined, and intersections and interchanges have been placed with regard to accessing existing industrial and commercial areas on either side of the river in Port Kells and the Ridge-Meadows area of Maple Ridge, immediately west of Hammond.

The road is under the jurisdiction of TransLink, the organization responsible for the regional transportation network in the Greater Vancouver region. On August 25, 2017, B.C. Premier John Horgan announced that all tolls on the Golden Ears bridge will be removed starting September 1, 2017.

== Route details ==
The expressway begins at 96th Avenue just west of Highway 15 in Surrey, a major route leading to the U.S. border, and continues eastward, passing through intersections to access the Port Kells Industrial Area. The Golden Ears Way becomes a freeway after the 192nd Street intersection and links 200th Street south to Langley City Centre, before curving northward onto the Golden Ears Bridge. In Maple Ridge, interchanges have been constructed close to commercial areas; a particular focus is the interchange at Highway 7, where most Golden Ears Way traffic is expected to exit the connector. The road past Highway 7 is mostly a two-laned expressway linking to residential and agricultural areas in the north of Maple Ridge, ending at the intersection with 210th Street and continuing beyond as 128th Avenue.

== Exit list ==
The entire route is in Metro Vancouver.

Location	km	mi	Destinations	Notes
Surrey	0.00	0.00	Highway 15 (176th Street) to Highway 1 (TCH) / Highway 17 / 96th Avenue – USA border	At-grade, traffic signals; continues as 96th Avenue
Surrey	0.70	0.43	180th Street	At-grade, traffic signals
Surrey	1.70	1.06	Golden Ears Connector (Highway 901:3144 west)	At-grade, traffic signals; connects to Highway 17
Surrey	3.40	2.11	192nd Street to Highway 1 (TCH) west – Port Kells, Vancouver	At-grade, traffic signals
Langley (township)	5.30	3.29	200th Street to Highway 1 (TCH) east – Langley (city), Hope	Southbound exit only via 199A Street; northbound entrance only via 201st Street
↑ / ↓	6.20– 7.00	3.85– 4.35	Golden Ears Bridge over the Fraser River	
Pitt Meadows – Maple Ridge boundary	8.10	5.03	113B Avenue / Airport Way	Interchange; to Pitt Meadows Airport
Pitt Meadows – Maple Ridge boundary	9.10	5.65	Maple Meadows Way to Highway 7 east – Maple Ridge, Mission	Northbound exit; transit only southbound entrance
Pitt Meadows – Maple Ridge boundary	9.80	6.09	Highway 7 west (Lougheed Highway) – Pitt Meadows, Coquitlam, Vancouver	Partially grade separated, traffic signals; no southbound access to Highway 7 east
Pitt Meadows – Maple Ridge boundary	11.30	7.02	203rd Street	At-grade, traffic signals
Maple Ridge	12.60	7.83	210th Street / 128th Avenue	At-grade, traffic signals; continues as 128th Avenue
1.000 mi = 1.609 km; 1.000 km = 0.621 mi: Incomplete access
