= Pitt River Swing Bridge =

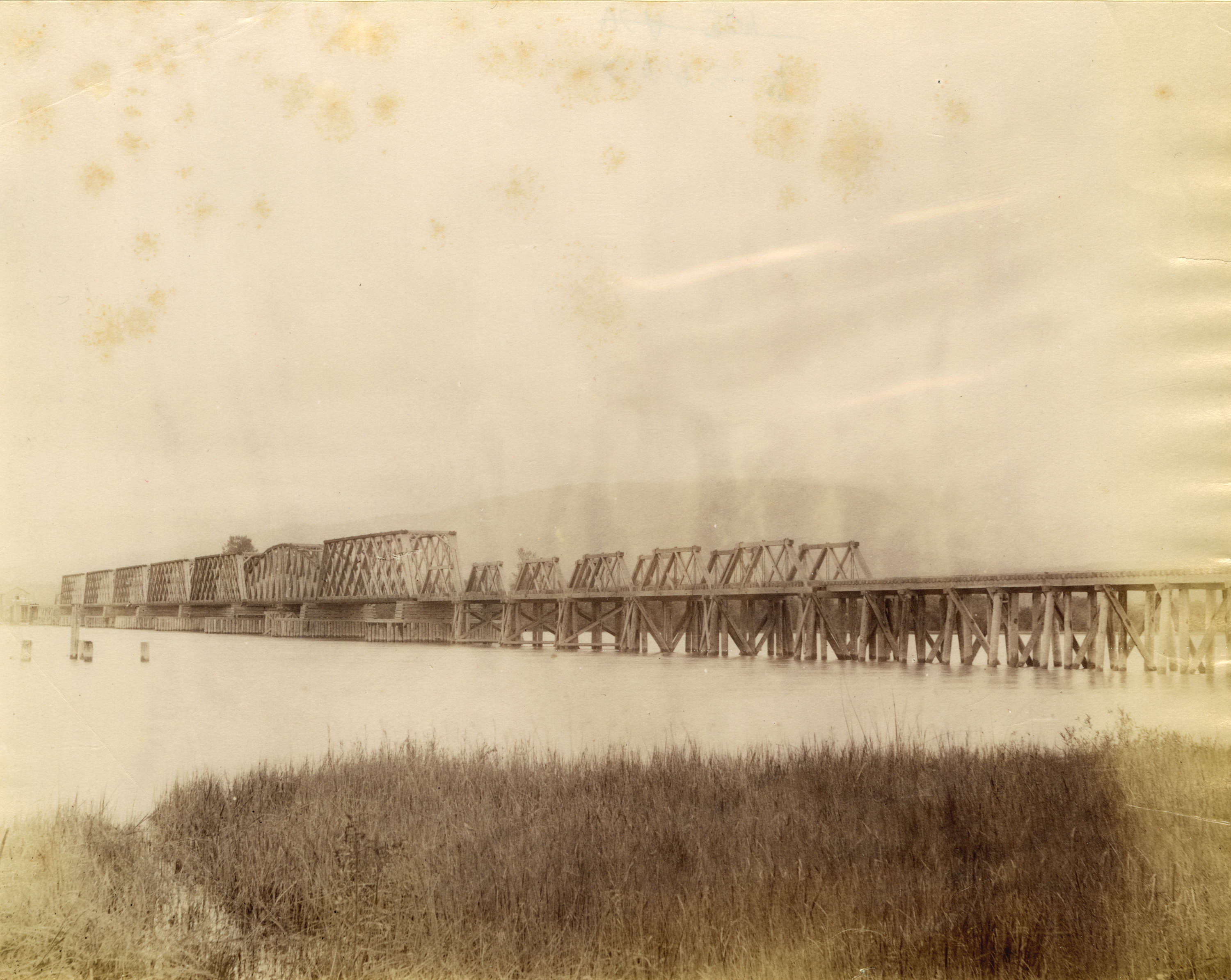
- The first version of the Pitt River Swing Bridge during the 1880s
- Coordinates: 49.2453°N 122.7341°W
- Carries: Freight and passenger trains
- Crosses: Pitt River
- Locale: Port Coquitlam and Pitt Meadows; British Columbia, Canada
- Owner: Canadian Pacific Kansas City

Characteristics
- Design: Swing bridge
- Total length: 530 m (1,750 ft)
- Longest span: 84 m (276 ft)

Rail characteristics
- No. of tracks: 2
- Track gauge: 4 ft 8 1/2 in (1,435 mm) (standard gauge)
- Electrified: No

History
- Opened: 1883
- Rebuilt: 1907, 1914

Statistics
- Daily traffic: 45 (as of 2024)

Location
- Location in Greater Vancouver

The Pitt River CPR Bridge is a railroad swing bridge that crosses the Pitt River between Port Coquitlam and Pitt Meadows in British Columbia, Canada. The bridge is owned and operated by Canadian Pacific Kansas City (CPKC), formerly Canadian Pacific Railway (CPR). Besides freight traffic, the bridge also hosts West Coast Express commuter trains.

== History ==
The railway bridge was built by CPR, which the federal government spun off in 1881 as an effort to build Canada's first transcontinental railway. The original version was completed and operational by mid-October 1883. This first bridge had timber piers and timber truss spans. To cross the bridge, a train had to undergo a cumbersome procedure. A railroad crew would first uncouple the locomotive from the rest of the train cars, run the locomotive over the bridge by itself, couple another locomotive to the end of the train cars, use that second locomotive to push the train cars over the bridge (but uncouple and stop that locomotive before it reached the bridge), and then recouple the first locomotive and the train cars back to their original state.

The original bridge was replaced by a second version in late October 1907. This new version was made in a Pratt truss style that uses concrete piers and metal truss spans. The replacement bridge increased the available ship navigation width when opened from 15 metres (50 ft) for the original bridge to 30 metres (100 ft). This second version was a single-track railway bridge that was replaced after only less than a decade because of high traffic volumes. CPR built a third version, this time a double-track railway bridge, which opened in late September 1914. This third version of the bridge had 12 spans, compared to 8 spans for the second version.

However, the second Pitt River CPR bridge was purchased by the provincial government, which floated the retired bridge slightly upstream and repurposed it as the original Pitt River Bridge for road traffic. The reused bridge served in that capacity for about 40 years before it was replaced in the 1950s by a new road bridge. Western Canada Steel, a private steel company, purchased the old bridge again. It floated the twice-retired bridge downstream to the North Arm of the Fraser River to provide a road-rail bridge link from its steel plant on Twigg Island to southern Vancouver and to northern Richmond, British Columbia. After the steel plant closed in 1988, the bridge was retired for good, although remnants of the second Pitt River CPR bridge remain at Twigg Island and Richmond.

In 2004, upgrade or replacement of the Pitt River Swing Bridge was named as a first-priority project by the Greater Vancouver Gateway Council (a public-private regional trade group). However, future traffic projections estimated that the bridge would still be well below capacity usage. The Pitt River Swing Bridge was regarded as successfully providing congestion relief for the more capacity-constrained New Westminster Bridge under coordinated rail operations between CPR and Canadian National Railway (CNR).

== Description ==
The bridge crosses the Pitt River about 3.2 kilometres (2 mi) before the river empties into the Fraser River opposite to Port Mann, Surrey, and about 9.7 kilometres (6 mi) upstream of New Westminster. The bridge has a total length of about 530 metres (1,750 ft), and it opens for marine traffic by rotating a 84-metre long (276 ft) swing span that weighs 590 tonnes (650 short tons). In addition to the swing span, there are eight short plate girder spans, two 78-metre (257 ft) fixed truss spans, and one 55-metre (182 ft) fixed truss span. The truss of the swing span was recycled from the former single-track CPR bridge over the Red River in Winnipeg, Manitoba. The fixed truss spans are on the west side of the river, the swing truss span is in the middle, and the plate girder spans are on the east side of the river. The maximum depth of the river below the bridge was about 21 metres (70 ft).

As of 2024, the bridge averages about 45 daily train crossings, and it opens about 15 times per day. The bridge requires about 8 minutes to open or close the swing span. When opened, the Port Coquitlam side of the opened bridge has a channel width of 30 metres (98 ft) at a control depth of 6.1 metres (20 ft), while the Pitt Meadows side has a channel width of 21 metres (69 ft) and a control depth of 3.3 metres (11 ft).

== Bibliography ==
- IBI Group (December 17, 2004). Lower mainland rail infrastructure study (PDF). Greater Vancouver Gateway Council (Report).
