= British Columbia Highway 7A =

Highway in British Columbia

Highway 7A
- Barnet Highway; Barnet Road; Hastings Street; St Johns Street; Inlet Drive

Route information
- Maintained by the Ministry of Transportation and Infrastructure
- Length: 25.9 km (16.1 mi)
- Existed: ~1953–1999

Major junctions
- West end: Highway 1A / Highway 99 / Highway 99A (Georgia Street) in Vancouver
- Highway 1 (TCH) in Vancouver
- East end: Highway 7 in Coquitlam

Location
- Country: Canada
- Province: British Columbia
- Major cities: Vancouver; Burnaby; Port Moody; Coquitlam

Highway system
- British Columbia provincial highways
← Highway 7	→ Highway 7B

Highway 7A, known locally and on street signs as the Barnet Highway, Barnet Road, St. Johns Street, Inlet Drive and Hastings Street, was Highway 7's original 1941 route between the harbour in Vancouver and Port Moody. The highway gained the 7A designation around 1953 due to Highway 7 being re-designated along Lougheed Highway through Maillardville and Central Burnaby and was disestablished on April 1, 1999.

== Route details ==
The 26 km (16 mi) long Highway 7A largely followed a parallel route alongside the Canadian Pacific Railway. The highway started off in the west at Seymour Street in Downtown Vancouver, and went 8 km (5.0 mi) along Hastings Street, passing its junction with Highway 1 en route, until it reached Boundary Road, where the highway crossed into Burnaby. Highway 7A continued east along Hastings Street in Burnaby for 5 km (3.1 mi) before turning northeast via Inlet Drive onto Barnet Highway. Once Hastings Street terminates the road narrows from 6 lanes to four, and the speed limit is upped from 50 to 80 km/h (from 31 to 50 mph). Barnet Highway carried Highway 7A on a winding 9 km (5.6 mi) long route on the south shore of Burrard Inlet through Burnaby and into Port Moody, where it meets an intersection with St. John's Street. Highway 7A then travelled 5 km (3.1 mi) east along St. Johns Street to its junctions with Dewdney Trunk Road and Ioco Road, after which it bears the street name Barnet Highway again, before terminating at its junction with Highway 7 in Coquitlam.

== History ==
Historically speaking, the route that Highway 7A took consisted of three distinct roads: the Dewdney Trunk Road, the Barnet Highway and Hastings Street. All of these roads have existed for well over a century. Dewdney Trunk road was once the principal route for traffic north of the Fraser and Hastings Street had been established early on in the history of Vancouver and Burnaby as municipalities. Both Barnet and Dewdney were completed around the turn of the 20th century

In 1941, a province-wide highway numbering scheme came into effect, with Hastings, Barnet, St. Johns and Dewdney Trunk becoming part of Highway 7. In 1952, Dewdney Trunk lost its highway designation as a new segment of Highway 7 from Shaughnessy Street to today's intersection of St. Johns and Dewdney Trunk Road was completed. This included the building of a new overhead crossing the Canadian Pacific Railway tracks.

At some point in the early 1950s (possibly 1953) Highway 7 was rerouted to the newer Lougheed Highway through Maillardville and Central Burnaby. This finally gave Hastings, Barnet Highway and St. Johns Street the Highway 7A designation. During the mid-50s multiple improvements were made along the Barnet Highway section. In 1959, a study conducted by the Technical Committee for Metropolitan Highway Planning suggested the building of a series freeways throughout Vancouver. The committee looked at the possibility of a freeway over Burnaby Mountain which would be a bypass the Barnet over Burnaby Mountain, but ultimately rejected it. Different proposals called for a freeway bypass of Port Moody, a freeway through the Coquitlam Chines and others. None of these plans ever came to fruition.

Barnet Highway remained a two lane highway until the 1990s, when the province began to recognize that congestion was starting to build throughout the overall length of highway 7A. Using the concept of HOV lanes as a means to lessen single occupancy vehicle use and reduce said congestion, the province began to design the Barnet/Hastings People-Mover Project. The project started in 1991 and saw various layouts be considered. However, it was ultimately decided that Hastings would be widened to six lanes and the Barnet highway be finally upgraded into a four-lane facility. The right hand lanes in each direction along the two segments would operate as HOV lanes from 6:00 AM to 8:30 AM towards Vancouver and from 3:30 PM to 6:00 PM towards Port Moody. The improvement also saw the addition of an HOV lane going westbound on St. Johns Street and Clarke St. in Port Moody. The project was completed on September 4, 1996, at a cost of $105 million (equivalent to $161,811,024 in 2020). Counterintuitively, the project led to an increase in travel times on certain stretches of the route.

As part of the creation of TransLink, a major road network was to be created and maintained. The province had also decided to handover hundreds of kilometres of roadways to municipalities throughout the province. Highway 7A's component routes were a part of the handover, and so on the April 1, 1999, Highway 7A ceased to be.

The Burnaby section of this road has been renamed to Barnet Road.

== Major intersections ==
The entire route is in Metro Vancouver Regional District.

Location	km	mi	Destinations	Notes
Vancouver	0.0	0.0	Howe Street (Highway 99 south) / Seymour Street – Airport, Canada–United States border Georgia Street (Highway 99 north) – Whistler	Former western terminus; Highway 7A followed Howe Street and Seymour Street (one-way pair) north; former Highway 1A / Highway 99A south
Vancouver	0.5	0.31	Hastings Street west	Highway 7A followed Hastings Street
Vancouver	0.6	0.37	Granville Street	Granville Mall (transit only) south of Hastings Street; near Waterfront station
Vancouver	1.1	0.68	Cambie Street	
Vancouver	1.8	1.1	Main Street	To former Highway 1A / Highway 99A
Vancouver	3.4	2.1	Clark Drive	
Vancouver	3.9	2.4	Commercial Drive	
Vancouver	6.7	4.2	Cassiar Connector (Highway 901:2545 south / Highway 901:2546 north) to Highway 1 (TCH) – Hope, Whistler	Highway 1 passes underneath Hastings Street via the Cassiar Tunnel; Highway 1 exit 26
Burnaby	12.8	8.0	Hastings Street east (to Burnaby Mountain Parkway) – Simon Fraser University	Becomes Barnet Road
Port Moody	23.5	14.6	Dewdney Trunk Road	
Coquitlam	25.9	16.1	Highway 7 (Lougheed Highway) / Pinetree Way – Port Coquitlam	Former eastern terminus; continues as Highway 7 east
1.000 mi = 1.609 km; 1.000 km = 0.621 mi: HOV only
