= Dewdney Trunk Road =

Road in British Columbia, Canada

The Dewdney Trunk Road was one of the earliest major roads in the Fraser Valley of British Columbia, Canada. Originally running from Port Moody to Dewdney, just east of Mission, it exists in three sections today:

- An arterial route running roughly parallel and south of the Barnet and Lougheed Highways in Port Moody, Coquitlam and Port Coquitlam.
- A series of side roads in Pitt Meadows north of the Lougheed Highway from the Pitt River Bridge to the Ridge—Meadows area near the boundary with Maple Ridge.
- A main arterial route, also one of the main commercial streets in downtown Haney, corresponding with what would otherwise be 120th Avenue while within Maple Ridge, running from its intersection with the Lougheed Highway in Ridge—Meadows generally parallel to and to the north of the Lougheed across northern Maple Ridge into northern Mission. After crossing Stave Falls Dam it reaches the community of Steelhead and turns south, threading its way through a series of turns in the Cedar Valley and Ferndale areas before arriving at its current terminus in Hatzic, just east of Mission.

== See also ==
- Dewdney Trail
