= Cape Horn Interchange =

Highway interchange in British Columbia, Canada

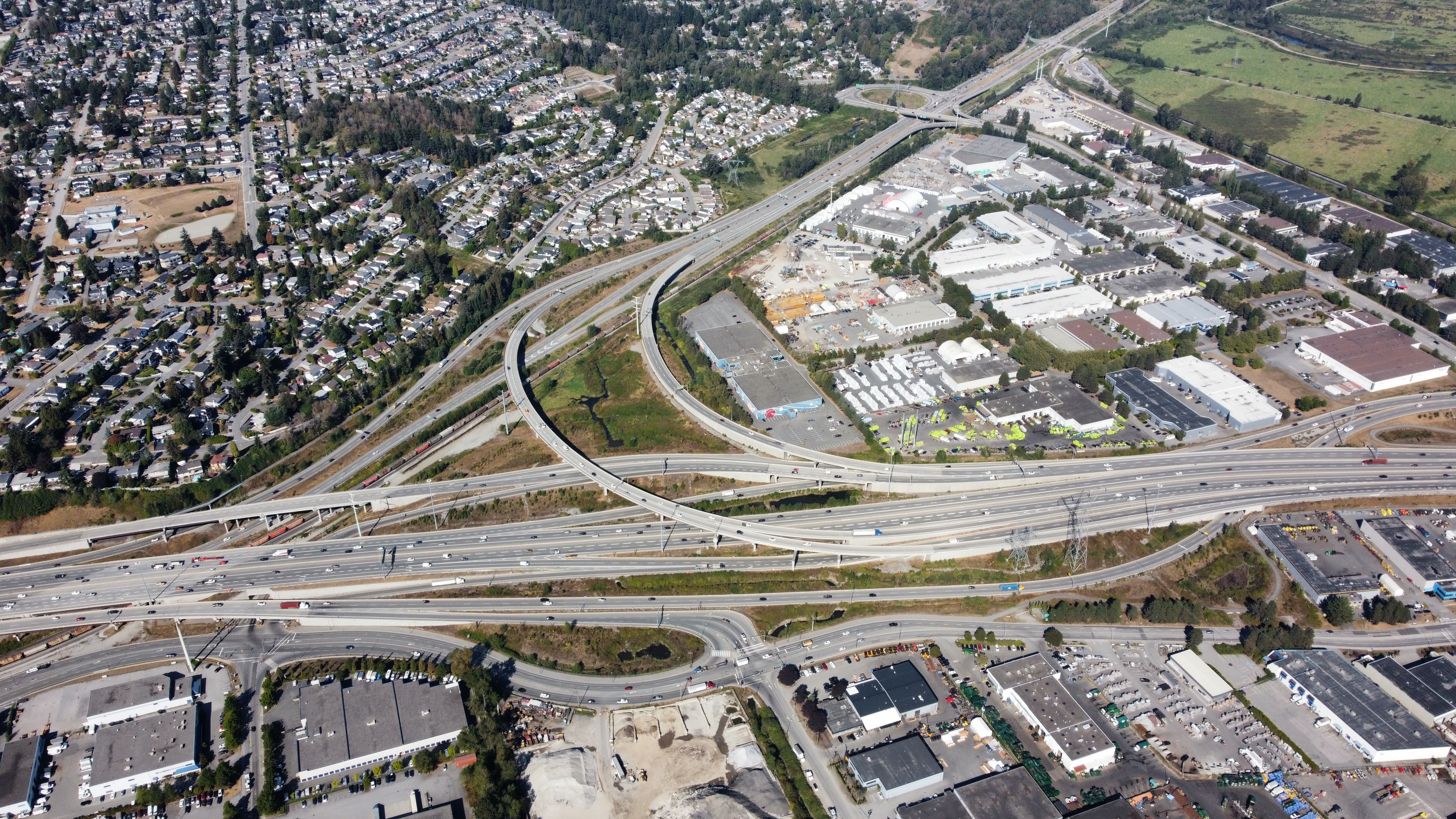
- Cape Horn Interchange as viewed from above
- Interactive map of Cape Horn Interchange

Location
- Coquitlam, British Columbia
- Coordinates: 49°13′45.2″N 122°49′57.0″W
- Roads at junction: Highway 1 (Trans-Canada Highway); Highway 7 (Lougheed Highway); Highway 7B (Mary Hill Bypass); United Boulevard

Construction
- Type: Stack interchange
- Opened: 1960s, significantly remodeled 2010-2013
- Maintained by: BC Ministry of Transportation

The Cape Horn Interchange is a major interchange that connects British Columbia Highway 1 (Trans-Canada Highway) to Lougheed Highway (Highway 7), a heavily signalized thoroughfare in Coquitlam, Port Coquitlam, and Burnaby, and the Mary Hill Bypass (Highway 7B), bypassing the Coquitlam and Port Coquitlam sections of Lougheed Highway and forming the quickest route to Pitt Meadows and Maple Ridge. It also includes several exits to United Boulevard, a light-industrial and commercial road in southern Coquitlam.

The Canadian Pacific Railway mainline roughly follows the alignment of Lougheed Highway in this area, and skirts the south and east sides of the interchange.

== Design ==
This interchange contains several types of interchanges within it, but overall is a hybrid stack interchange. The junction between Highways 1 and 7 is a 4-way, 3-level stack interchange, with two turning movements omitted (eastbound Hwy 7 to westbound Hwy 1 and eastbound Hwy 1 to westbound Hwy 7). Vehicles making those movements should use the Brunette Avenue Interchange, 4 km west of the Cape Horn.

Hwy 7B (the Mary Hill Bypass) has a half-single point urban interchange (westbound exit, eastbound entrance) with United Boulevard, and then westbound 7B merges onto Highways 1 and 7 westbound. Traffic from eastbound Highways 1 and 7 each have a free-flowing ramp to Highway 7B east.

Just north of the Hwys 1/7 junction, United Boulevard intersects Lougheed Highway with two free-flowing ramps (eastbound Lougheed to southbound United, northbound United to eastbound Lougheed). All other turning movements must be made over an overpass and down a small connecting road to a light (which forms a continuous green t-intersection with the Lougheed Highway mainline). Via this connection, traffic from Mariner Way and Cape Horn Avenue (two major residential roads in Coquitlam) may also access the interchange.

On the Port Mann Bridge, where Highway 1 crosses the Fraser River immediately east of the interchange, eastbound traffic to 152nd Street/Surrey City Centre must exit before the bridge, in the middle of the Cape Horn Interchange, and cross the bridge in a 2-lane carriageway, separate from the mainline. Westbound traffic follows a similar arrangement, where vehicles seeking to exit at the Cape Horn Interchange from Highway 1 westbound must exit before the bridge, at exit 44.

The Cape Horn Interchange also features a truck-only exit to the intersection of United Boulevard and Fawcett Road, accessed from within Highway 1 westbound's exit ramp to Highway 7 westbound. Trucks can also access Highway 1 east from the intersection of United and Fawcett. This entrance leads directly into the separated lanes for 152nd Street in Surrey, and they can merge back onto the mainline of the freeway after the exit to 152nd. General traffic may use these ramps on weekends and between 8 p.m. and 5 a.m. on weekdays. Note that the exit from Highways 1 and 7 eastbound to the intersection of United and Leeder Street (accessed via their combined ramps to Highway 7B) is open to all vehicles at all times.

== History ==
Originally opened with the expressway alignment of Highway 1 (in the 1960s), this interchange featured a trumpet interchange on Highway 1, a short connecting road, and then a modified half-cloverleaf interchange with Highway 7. As part of the Port Mann/Highway 1 Improvement project, which saw the replacement of the Port Mann Bridge, this interchange was significantly modified to reduce bottlenecks and weaving.

== Resources ==
- "Cape Horn Interchange Transportation Plan (PDF)" (PDF). Reimers Group. Spring 2010.
- "Cape Horn Interchange Summary of Improvements (PDF)" (PDF). Transportation Investment Corporation. January 2012.
