= Transportation Investment Corporation =

Public corporation in British Columbia, Canada

- Type: Crown Corporation
- Industry: Infrastructure; Transportation
- Headquarters: Vancouver, British Columbia, Canada
- Area served: British Columbia
- Key people: Amanda Farrell (Chief Executive Officer)
- Owner: Government of British Columbia
- Website: www.ticorp.ca

Transportation Investment Corporation (TI Corp) is a public Canadian crown corporation, established in 2008 under the Transportation Investment Act, initially to implement the Port Mann/Highway 1 Improvement Project. It works on major infrastructure projects in British Columbia.

== Port Mann/Highway 1 Improvement Project ==
This project comprised improvements to the Vancouver area's primary goods movement and commuting corridor, serving 120,000 vehicles daily through six municipalities, with important connections to other communities throughout the region.

The project was established in 2003 as part of the Provincial Gateway Program to address the problem of growing regional congestion and to improve the movement of people, goods, and transit.

TI Corp's involvement in this project included construction, operations and maintenance of 37 kilometres (23 mi) of improvements to the TransCanada Highway through Metro Vancouver, as well as development, implementation, and management of tolling operations to pay for the project.

Starting September 1, 2017, the Crown corporation stopped tolling traffic on the bridge, due to a new provincial government. Debt service was transferred to the province of British Columbia at a cost of $135 million per year.

== Current projects ==
- Broadway Subway project
- Fraser River tunnel project, to replace the George Massey Tunnel
- Pattullo Bridge replacement
- Steveston Interchange project
- Surrey-Langley SkyTrain

== See also ==
- Saskatchewan Transportation Company
