= Falaise Park =

Park in Vancouver, Canada

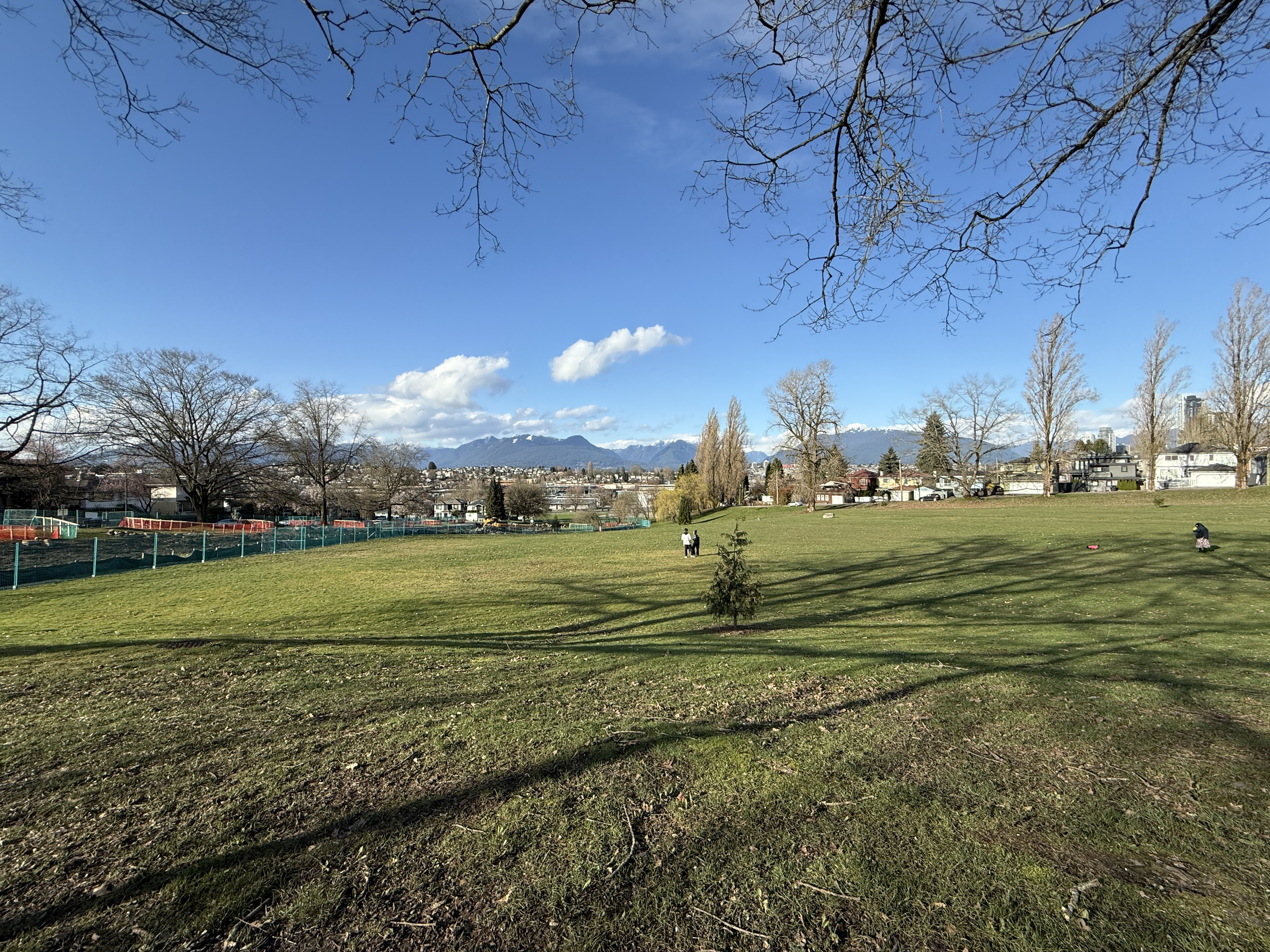
- Falaise Park with the view of the North Shore Mountains in 2026
- Interactive map of Falaise Park
- Type: Public Park
- Location: Vancouver, British Columbia
- Coordinates: 49.2562°N 123.0316°W
- Area: 18.7 acres (7.6 ha)
- Operator: City of Vancouver
- Public transit: Rupert Station (Millennium Skytrain)

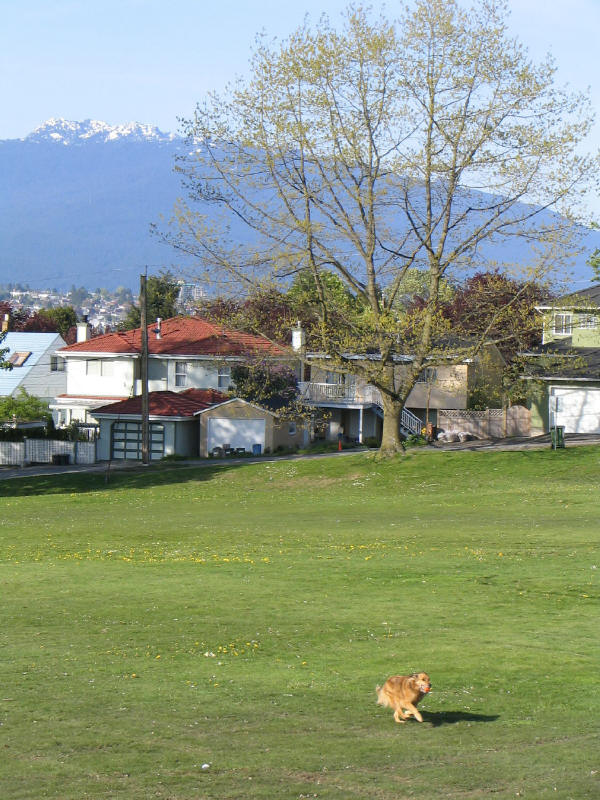
Lower Falaise Park

Falaise Park is a large urban park in East Vancouver, British Columbia, Canada. It is located on Vancouver-Burnaby border, between Rupert Street and Boundary Road, just south of Rupert Station of the Millennium Line.

Falaise Park consists of two parts, an upper one and a lower one, separated by an elementary school. Both have children's playgrounds. The lower half that borders on Grandview Highway also has sports facilities.
