= Haig, British Columbia =

Coordinates: 49.396°N 121.455°W

Location of Haig in British Columbia

Haig is a settlement in British Columbia. It was named for Douglas Haig, 1st Earl Haig, a British senior officer during the First World War.
