= Renfrew station =

Metro Vancouver SkyTrain station

Renfrew
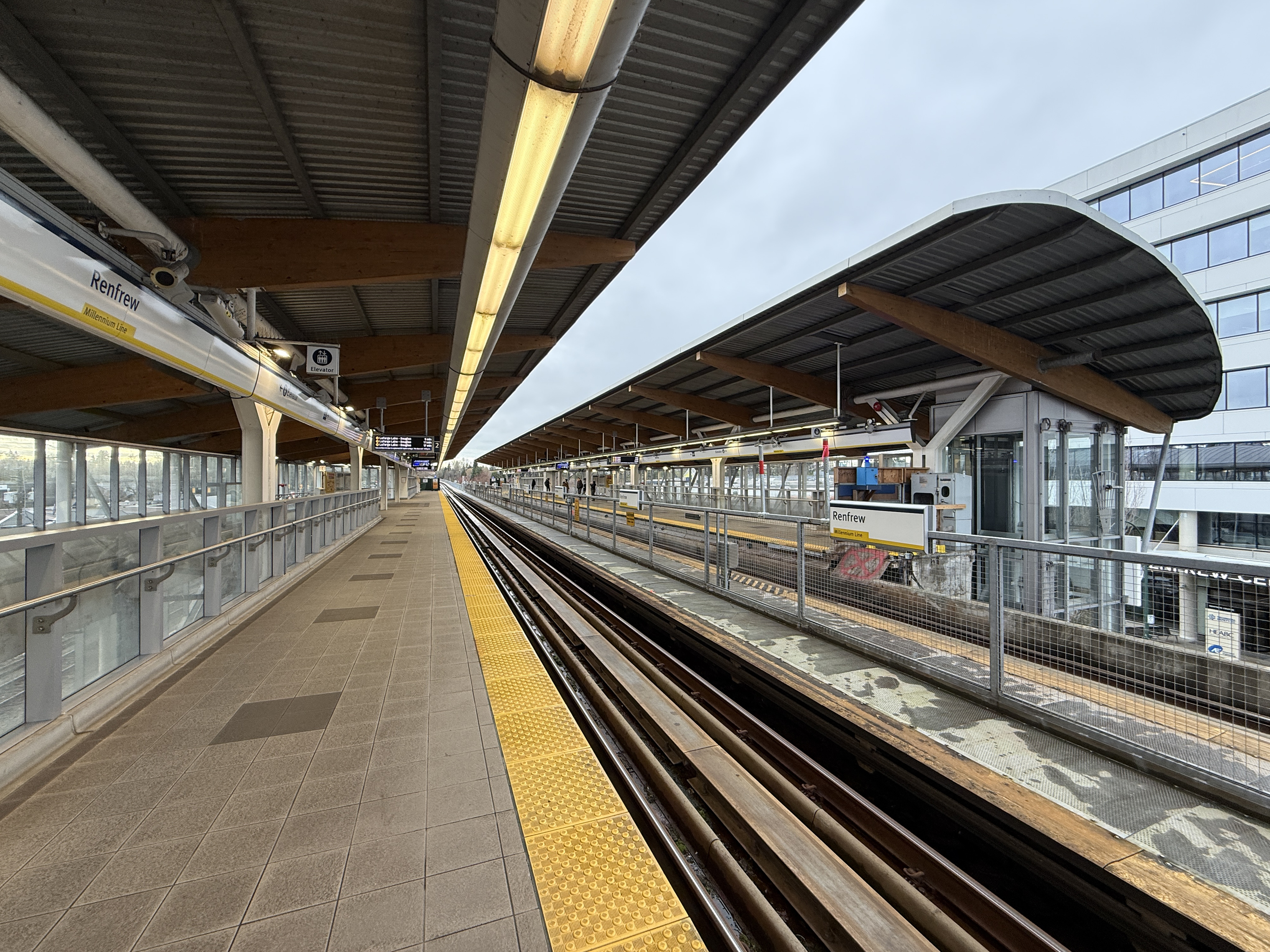

General information
- Location: 2998 E 12th Ave, Vancouver
- Coordinates: 49°15′32″N 123°02′43″W
- System: SkyTrain station
- Owner: TransLink
- Platforms: Side platforms
- Tracks: 2

Construction
- Structure type: Elevated
- Accessible: yes

Other information
- Station code: RE
- Fare zone: 1

History
- Opened: August 31, 2002

Passengers
- 2025: 1,147,000 ▼16.8%
- Rank: 42 of 54

Services
Preceding station	TransLink	Following station
Commercial–Broadway towards VCC–Clark	Millennium Line	Rupert towards Lafarge Lake–Douglas
Location

Renfrew is an elevated station on the Millennium Line of Metro Vancouver's SkyTrain rapid transit system. The station is located on East 12th Avenue at Renfrew Street, north of Grandview Highway in Vancouver, British Columbia, Canada.

The station serves the nearby LaSalle College Vancouver, as well as several office buildings, big box stores and local businesses.

== Station information ==
=== Entrances ===
Renfrew station is served by a single entrance located at the east end of the station. The entrance is located at the southwest corner of the intersection at Renfrew Street and 12th Avenue.

=== Transit connections ===
Renfrew station provides connections within Vancouver and is serviced by HandyDART. Routes are as follows:

Stop Number	Route
51082	16 Arbutus
58401	16 29th Avenue Station
