= Golden Ears Bridge =

Bridge in Langley, British Columbia, Canada

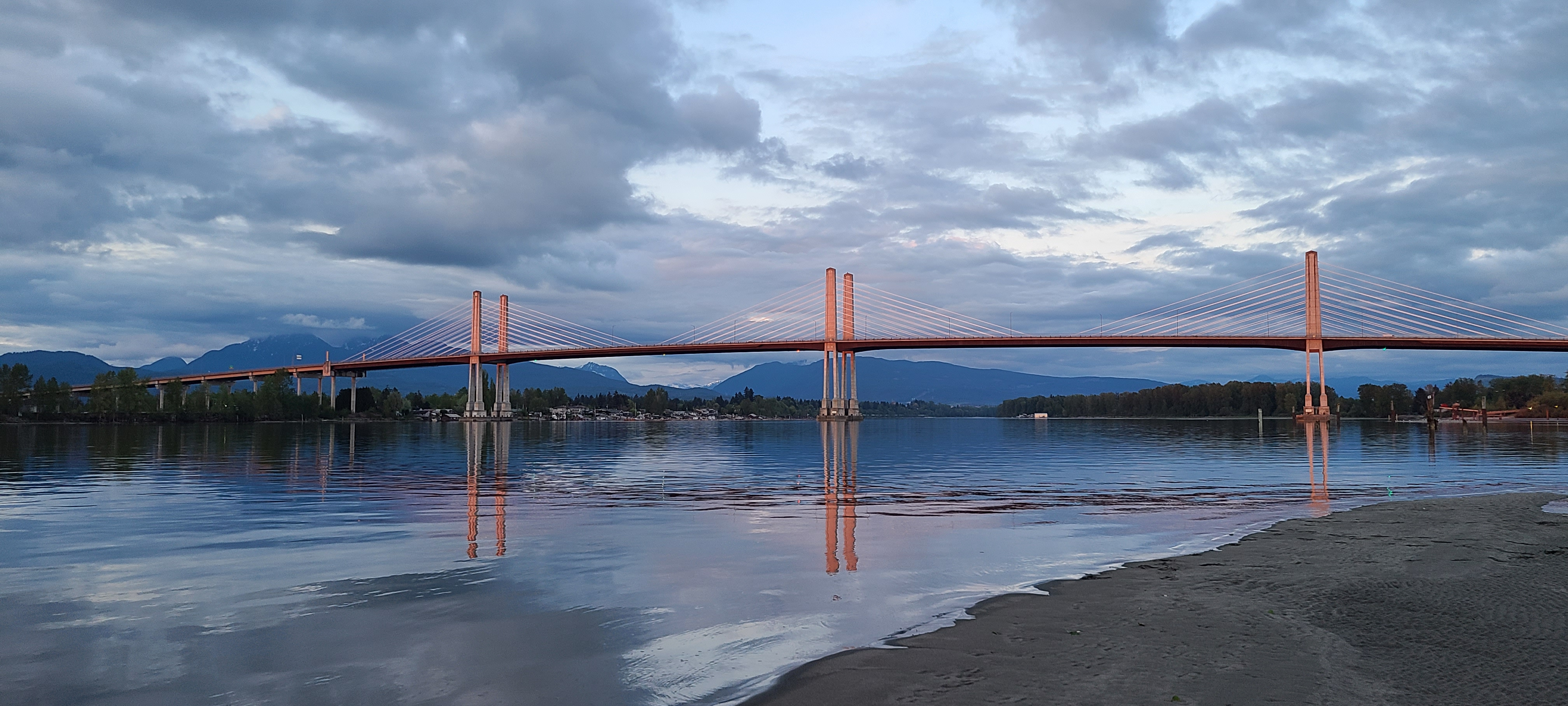
- Golden Ears Bridge from Langley
- Coordinates: 49.1967°N 122.665829°W
- Carries: 6 lanes of Golden Ears Way, pedestrians and bicycles
- Crosses: Fraser River
- Locale: Township of Langley; Maple Ridge
- Maintained by: TransLink

Characteristics
- Design: extradosed bridge
- Total length: 976 m (2410 m including approaches)
- Longest span: 244 m

History
- Designer: Buckland & Taylor
- Construction start: June 29, 2006
- Construction end: June 2009
- Construction cost: $808 million
- Opened: June 16, 2009 (Traffic)

Statistics
- Daily traffic: 30,000

Location
- Interactive map of Golden Ears Bridge

The Golden Ears Bridge is a six-lane extradosed bridge in Metro Vancouver, British Columbia. It spans the Fraser River, connecting Langley on the south side with Pitt Meadows and Maple Ridge on the north side. The bridge opened to traffic on June 16, 2009. The bridge replaced a previous ferry service several kilometres upstream and was run by a private consortium, the Golden Crossing General Partnership, until June 2041.

== About the bridge ==
The bridge, owned by TransLink, has a clearance of 40 m (130 ft), and a total length of 2,410 m (7,910 ft) including approaches. The extradosed bridge incorporates three main spans, each 244 m (801 ft) long and two shoreline spans, each 122 m (400 ft) long for total length of 976 m (3,202 ft) which makes it the longest extradosed bridge in North America. Eight pylons are situated in the river, 4 of which are 90 m (300 ft) high.

The bridge features bike-pedestrian protected lanes on each side. It boasts two golden metal eagle sculptures at the top of the bridge that were fashioned by a German company – after the initial sculptural design by a U.S. firm was abandoned for structural weakness.

The project was named through a community process and reflects the well-known lower Fraser Valley landmark, the Golden Ears peaks, which crown Mount Blanshard in Golden Ears Provincial Park. The successful submission to name the bridge was that of George Tabert, a local pastor.

=== Construction ===
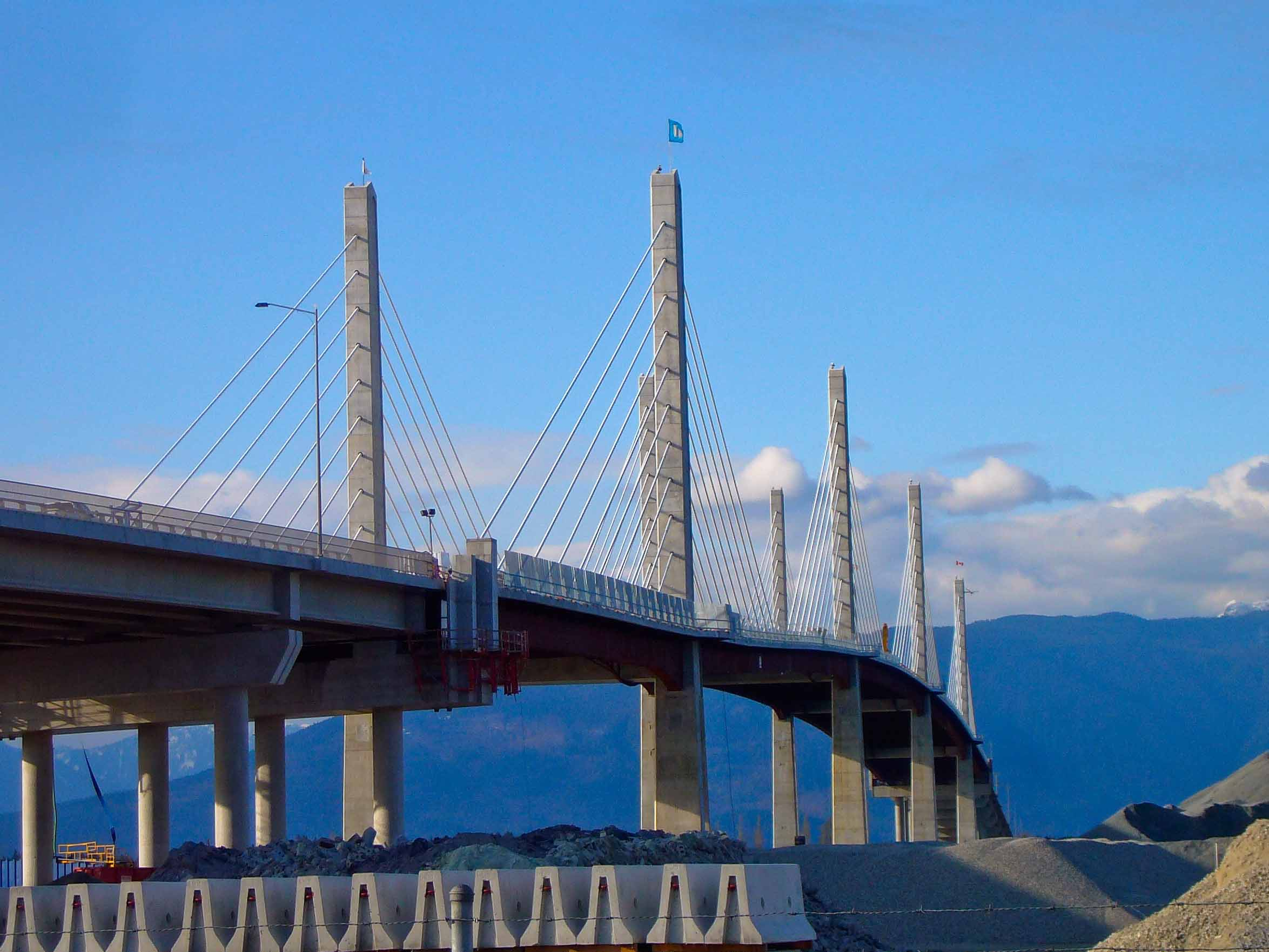
The Golden Ears Bridge in Langley.

The bridge was constructed by a joint venture of CH2M Hill and Bilfinger Berger called Golden Crossing Constructors Joint Venture, at a final cost of $808 million. The construction project, officially launched in June 2006, created 14 kilometres of new road. Golden Ears Way has direct connections to Lougheed Highway, Maple Meadows Way, 113B Avenue, 200th Street, 176th Street (Highway 15) and the Trans-Canada Highway (Highway 1). The completed bridge opened at 2:00AM on June 16, 2009.

The project was planned to permit archaeological teams to comb through a part of First Nations land that the bridge passed through. The team, led by a Simon Fraser University archaeology professor, discovered pottery shards, metal implements and 3,600-year-old wapato, or potatoes, evidence that the aboriginal peoples in the area engaged in farming. Some members of the Coast Salish Katzie Nation decried the way that the bridge affected what they described as a "3000 year old burial ground".

Bilfinger Berger applied to the federal government to bring in foreigners to work on the bridge, arguing that there was a shortage of qualified construction workers in Canada. The BC Federation of Labour disagreed, arguing that Bilfinger Berger was simply unprepared to pay market rates for skilled workers and wanted to exploit foreigners.

=== Financing ===
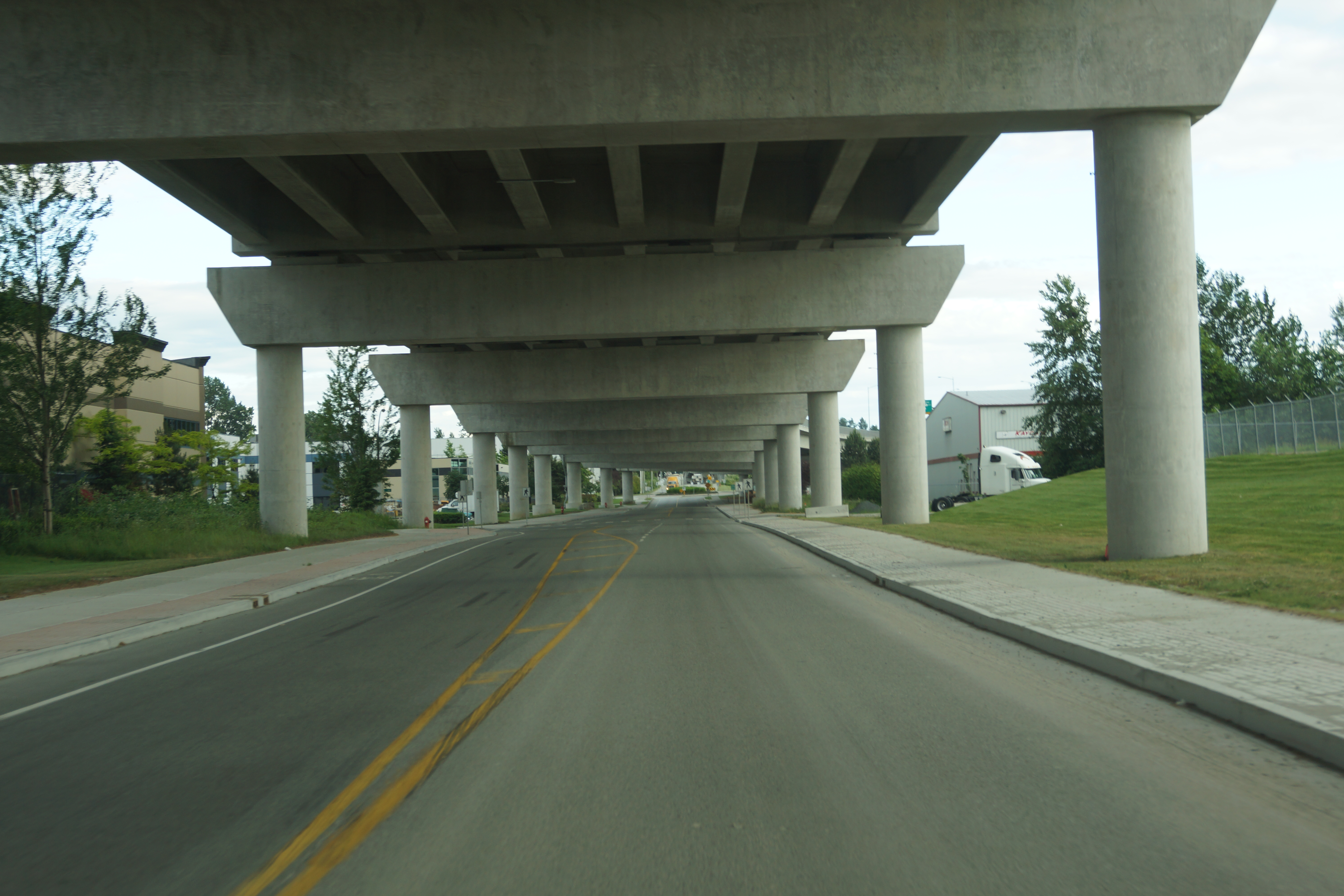
Underneath view of the Golden Ears Bridge Langley – showing concrete girder components.

The Golden Ears Bridge had a fixed total construction cost of $808 million (CAD), well over the initial budget of $600 million. The project was financed as a Public Private Partnership (P3) through which TransLink is leasing back the bridge over a 35-year timeframe. The P3 was administered by the provincial government organization Partnerships BC. This aspect of the project was controversial and it led Vancouver city councillor David Cadman to vote against the project when it was presented to the TransLink board for approval.

=== Former ferry ===
After the opening of the bridge TransLink ceased operation of the Albion Ferry on July 31, 2009, a passenger/vehicle ferry that had been operational since June 7, 1957. The Albion Ferry employed 59 full-time and 18 auxiliary employees for its run between Maple Ridge and Langley. In 2003, annual traffic on the free ferry amounted to 1.5 million vehicles and 4 million passengers. After the bridge opened, the ferries ceased to be used and the two ferries were sold in 2011 for $400,000 to a local marine transportation company.

== Timeline ==
=== 2004 ===
- August 6 – Environmental certification was received
- September 15 – TransLink and the Katzie First Nation signed a Benefit Agreement
- November – The Greater Vancouver Transportation Authority Act was amended to allow for tolling

=== 2005 ===
- January – A Request for Proposals was issued for the design, construction, operation, maintenance and rehabilitation
- February 16 – A bylaw governing tolling was passed by TransLink
- June 22 – TransLink and the four municipalities (Langley, Maple Ridge, Pitt Meadows and Surrey) finalized the Golden Ears Bridge Master Municipal Agreement
- December 7 – TransLink selected Golden Crossing Group as the proponent to design, build, finance, operate, and maintain the bridge.

=== 2006 ===
- June 29 – Construction began.

=== 2007 ===
- June 5 – Pile cap and pier construction underway on the bridge.

=== 2008 ===
- June 20 – 3,600-year-old native site found with evidence of native horticulture. Excavation to end and construction to resume by mid-July.

=== 2009 ===
- June 14 – Bridge opened to pedestrians only
- June 16 – Bridge opened to traffic

=== 2017 ===
- September 1 – Tolls are removed.

== Usage ==
During an initial toll-free introductory period in 2009, traffic averaged 37,000 crossings per day. Once tolls took effect, daily traffic dropped. In January 2010, daily traffic amounted to 21,000 trips. In April 2011 daily traffic had increased to 23,000 trips. This number rose with the bridge serving 30,000 trips each weekday by September 2011. The current 10 million trips annually far exceeds the previous ferry traffic on the route of 1.5 million vehicles and 4 million passengers.

== Past tolls ==
The new bridge used an electronic tolling system to track vehicles that cross to recover construction costs. Tolls had not been used in the Lower Mainland since the 1960s when they were removed from all bridges. This was also the first electronic toll bridge in Western Canada.

Drivers had the option of opening a tolling account. This includes an electronic tolling device, or transponder, to be mounted on the vehicle's windshield. It detects usage of the bridge, allowing toll charges to be automatically billed to the driver's account, streamlining the tolling process.

Vehicles without an electronic tolling device have their licence plates identified through an automated video recognition system, and will be billed accordingly. Drivers of such vehicles also have the option to pay for their trip in advance by establishing a temporary account with a credit card, and pay a lower toll rate than if they did not establish such an account. The video recognition system costs more for Translink to run over the long term because it requires that humans identify plates that the system is misreading and because of the need to respond to misreads in which people are wrongly billed.

There have been numerous media stories of fraud and people being charged by the automated system for crossing the bridge when they never had done so, including one story in which a local resident was charged for crossing the bridge more than 90 times, when he had never driven across it at all. On July 15, 2016 tolls on the Golden Ears Bridge increased to cover the rise in the Consumer Price Index. The increases range between 5–15 cents, depending on the size of the vehicle and type of account.

On August 25, 2017, B.C. Premier John Horgan announced that all tolls on the Golden Ears bridge will be removed starting September 1, 2017.

=== Toll rates ===
Rates effective up until August 31, 2017. Tolls were removed after September 1, 2017.

Type of Vehicle	Toll-Device	Pre-Registered	Unregistered (Pay-as-you-go)
Car	$3.15	$3.70	$4.40
Truck or bus	$6.25	$6.85	$7.45
large truck	$9.30	$9.95	$10.55
Motorcycle	not available	$1.50	$2.90

Above rates are current as of January 2013. TransLink has also experimented with reduced tolls during low-use times such as evenings, weekends, and statutory holidays. They commenced a six-week trial project in April 2011 which reduced tolls by 30% in such times.

The Passenger Transportation Board, which regulates taxi services in the Lower Mainland has created a regulation whereby taxis are to charge passengers a $6.90 surcharge for crossing the bridge, something that must be explained to the passenger in advance of starting the meter.

Bicycles, pedestrians, emergency vehicles and TransLink buses are exempt from the toll.

=== Toll revenues ===
TransLink acknowledged that in the early years of the bridge's operation, revenues have been lower than had been forecasted. The agency has indicated that they expect revenues to increase once drivers can no longer use the nearby Port Mann Bridge for free, as it will be tolled starting in 2013.

Year	Annual Revenue	Annual Expenditures
2010	$29.6 million	$52.0 million
2011	$33.8 million	$71.7 million
2012	$38.9 million	$78.9 million
2013	$39.5 million	$80.0 million

From 2013 Year-End Financial and Performance Report.

Toll revenues will rise to track inflation over the thirty-two-year payback period for the bridge which runs until 2040; the toll increase in 2011 was 3.5% on average. The difference between the toll revenue and TransLink's costs which it is obligated to pay the bridge’s builder each year will come out of TransLink's general operating budget; in 2011 this shortfall was estimated at $33 million.

Under its contract, TransLink has agreed to pay the private consortium which built, operates, and maintains the bridge a monthly fee of $500,000 per month in 2009 which rose to $4 million per month in 2011, and will top out at $4.8 million per month in 2015 – a monthly fee that will stay steady until the contract ends in 2041.

== See also ==
- List of crossings of the Fraser River
- List of bridges in Canada
