= Port Kells =

- Neighbourhood of Surrey
- Location of Port Kells within Metro Vancouver
- Coordinates: 49°10′00″N 122°42′00″W
- Country: Canada
- Province: British Columbia
- Region: Lower Mainland
- Regional District: Metro Vancouver
- City: Surrey
- Town Centre: Guildford

Government
  - Mayor: Brenda Locke
  - MP (Fed.): Gurbux Saini (Liberal)
  - MLA (Prov.): Garry Begg (NDP)
- Time zone: UTC−8 (PST)
  - Summer (DST): UTC−7 (PDT)

Port Kells is a neighborhood of Guildford, a town center in Surrey, British Columbia. The neighborhood is located in the northeastern sector of Guildford, and is adjacent to the Fraser River and west of Walnut Grove, Langley. It has two major components: a large rural southern portion located south of Highway 1, and a section north of the highway that consists mostly of industrial parks.

== History ==
Port Kells was founded in 1889 as the Township of Port Kells, and was established by two Irish pioneers, both named Henry Kells, who were brothers-in-law. It was originally intended as a port and was laid out in 1890 by the Royal Engineers. The area did not grow into the thriving town the two had intended, instead becoming mainly agricultural. The New Westminster and Southern Railway established a station in Port Kells in the late 1890s. The port was also a hub for logging operations along the Fraser River, and materials gathered at the port would be sent downriver to New Westminster.

In 1914, the Great Northern Railway sold its section from Hazelmere to Port Kells to the Canadian Northern Railway, and the area struggled.

In the early 1960s, the Trans-Canada Highway was built through Port Kells. Since the 1970s, the highway has provided a neat distinction between the industrial northern portion and the rural and residential southern portion of the community.

== Development ==
Industrial developments in North Port Kells occurred after 1970. In 2005, plans surfaced for development of the neighborhoods southern portion, which called for a mix of residential, commercial, and industrial uses from its present rural condition.
