= Rupert station =

Metro Vancouver SkyTrain station

Rupert
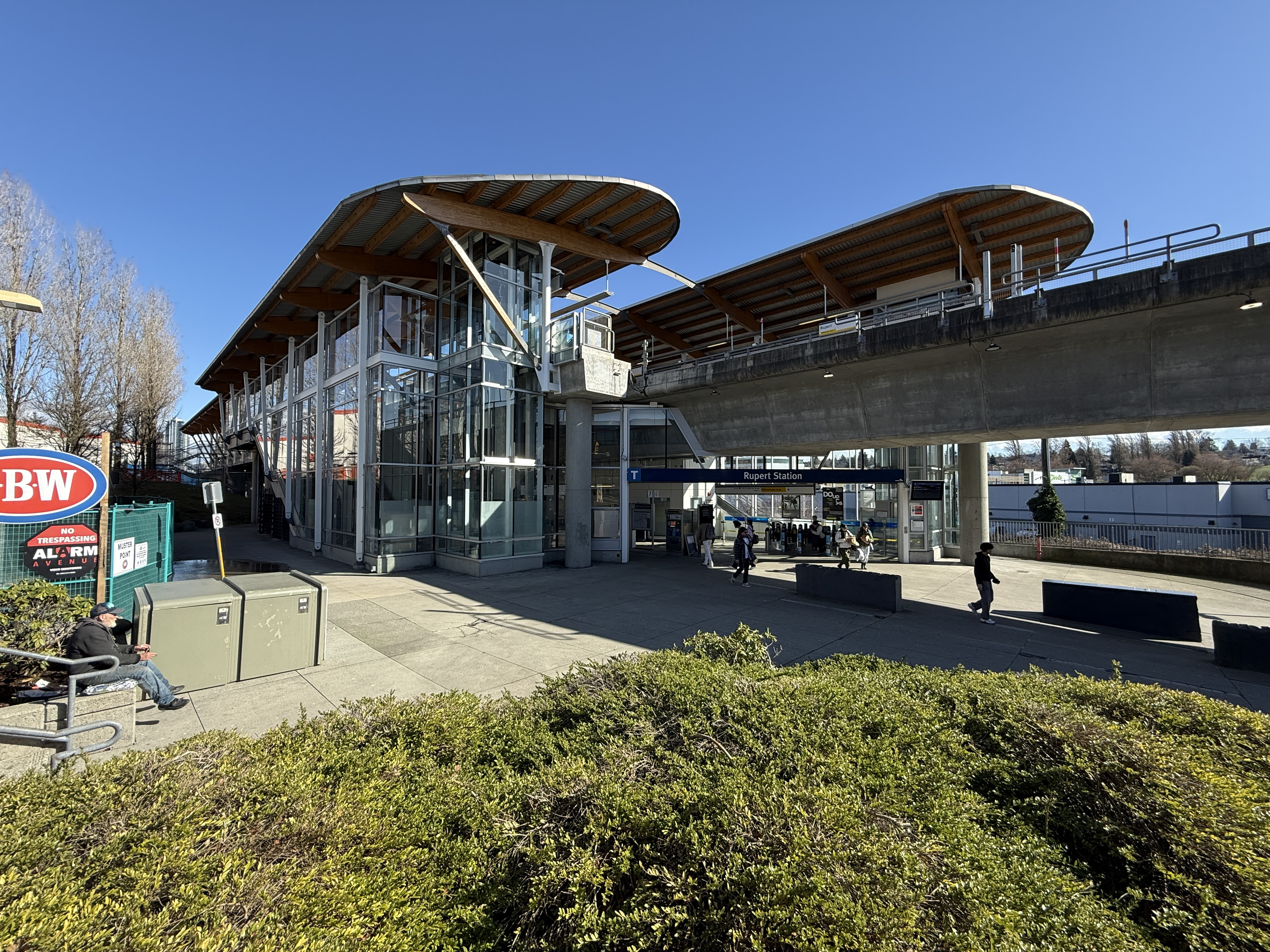
- Rubert station exterior in 2026

General information
- Location: 2698 Rupert Street, Vancouver
- Coordinates: 49°15′39″N 123°01′58″W
- System: SkyTrain station
- Owner: BC Ministry of Transportation, TransLink
- Platforms: Side platforms
- Tracks: 2

Construction
- Structure type: Elevated
- Accessible: yes

Other information
- Station code: RU
- Fare zone: 1

History
- Opened: August 31, 2002

Passengers
- 2025: 791,000 ▼7.7%
- Rank: 48 of 54

Services
Preceding station	TransLink	Following station
Renfrew towards VCC–Clark	Millennium Line	Gilmore towards Lafarge Lake–Douglas
Location

Rupert is an elevated station on the Millennium Line of Metro Vancouver's SkyTrain rapid transit system. The station is located on Rupert Street in Vancouver, British Columbia, Canada.

Nearby businesses include the BC Liquor Distribution Branch and the Vancouver Film Studios. Falaise Park is also located just south of Rupert station.

== Station information ==
=== Transit connections ===
Rupert station provides connections within Vancouver and is also serviced by HandyDART. Routes are as follows:

Stop Number	Route
58130	27 Kootenay Loop
58129	27 Joyce Station
