= Pitt River Bridge =

Pitt River Bridge (2009)
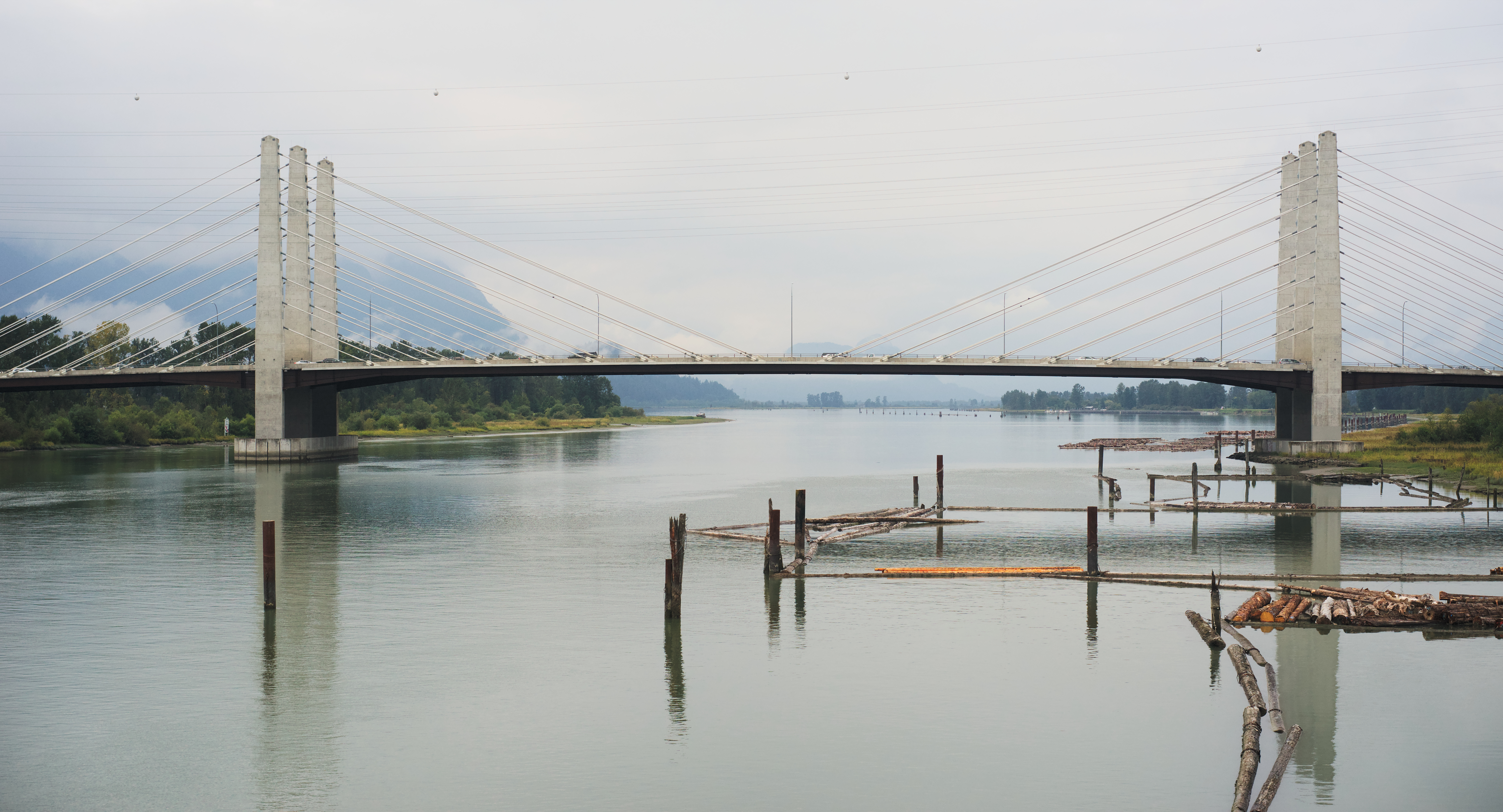
- Coordinates: 49.2482°N 122.7297°W
- Carries: Seven lanes of British Columbia Highway 7, pedestrians and bicycles
- Crosses: Pitt River
- Locale: Port Coquitlam; Pitt Meadows
- Owner: British Columbia Ministry of Transportation and Infrastructure
- Preceded by: Pitt River Bridge (1915, 1957, 1978)

Characteristics
- Design: Cable-stayed bridge

History
- Opened: October 4, 2009

Statistics
- Daily traffic: 79,000

Location
- Interactive map of Pitt River Bridge (2009)

The Pitt River Bridge is a cable-stayed bridge that spans the Pitt River between Port Coquitlam and Pitt Meadows in British Columbia, Canada. The bridge is part of Highway 7, carrying Lougheed Highway across the river. The current bridge opened on October 4, 2009. The bridge includes a 380-metre (1,250 ft) cable-stay bridge structure, 126 metres (413 ft) of multi-span approaches, a 50-metre (160 ft) interchange structure, and approximately 2 kilometres (1.2 mi) of grade construction. Total project cost for the bridge was $200 million.

== Previous bridges ==
Pitt River Bridge (1915)
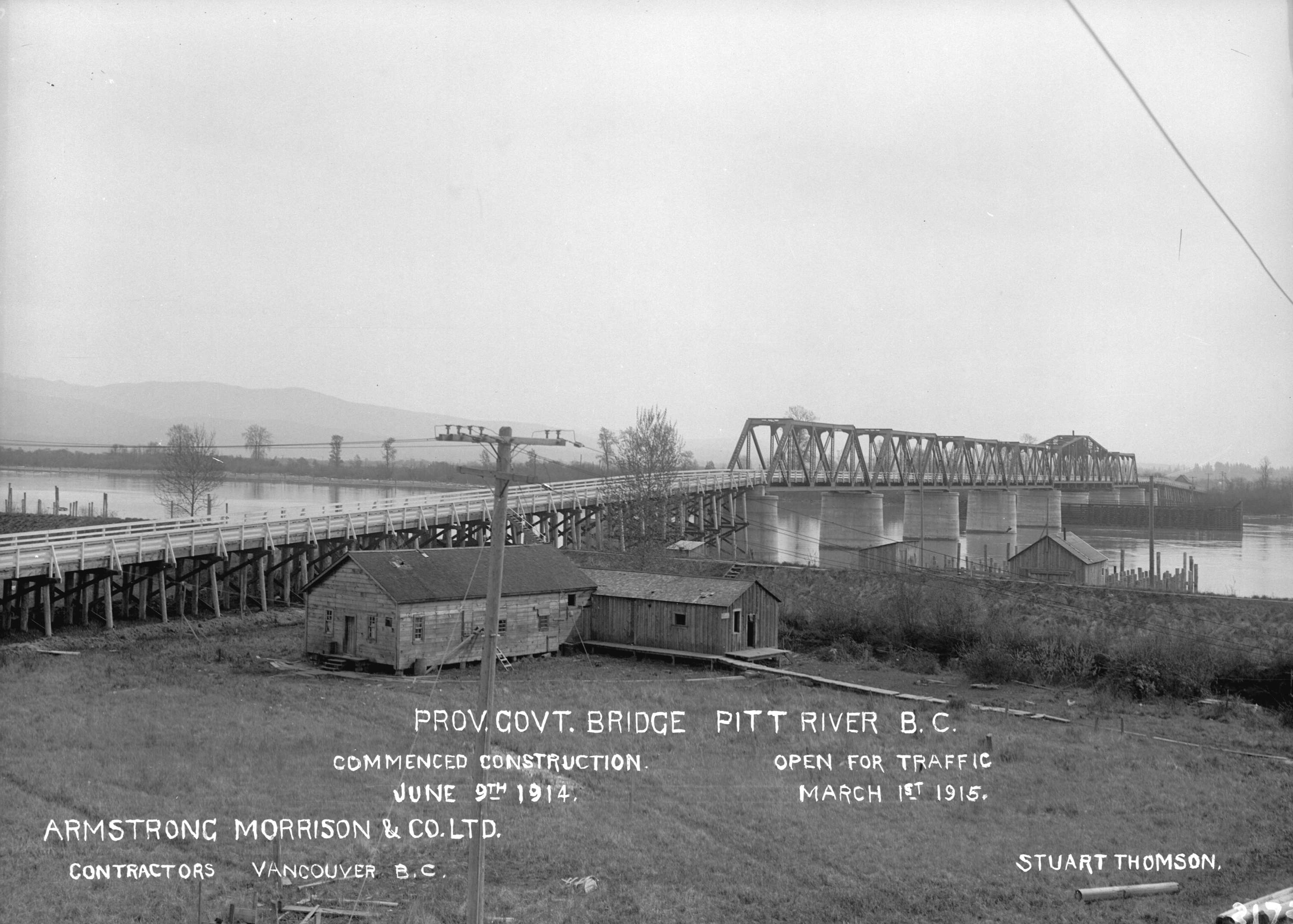
- Coordinates: 49°14′54″N 122°43′48″W
- Carries: Dewdney Trunk Road, Lougheed Highway
- Crosses: Pitt River
- Locale: Port Coquitlam; Pitt Meadows
- Maintained by: Department of Public Works, Department of Highways
- Followed by: Pitt River Bridge (1957)

Characteristics
- Design: swing bridge

History
- Opened: 1 or 3 March 1915

Location
- Interactive map of Pitt River Bridge (1915)

Pitt River Bridge (1957, 1978)
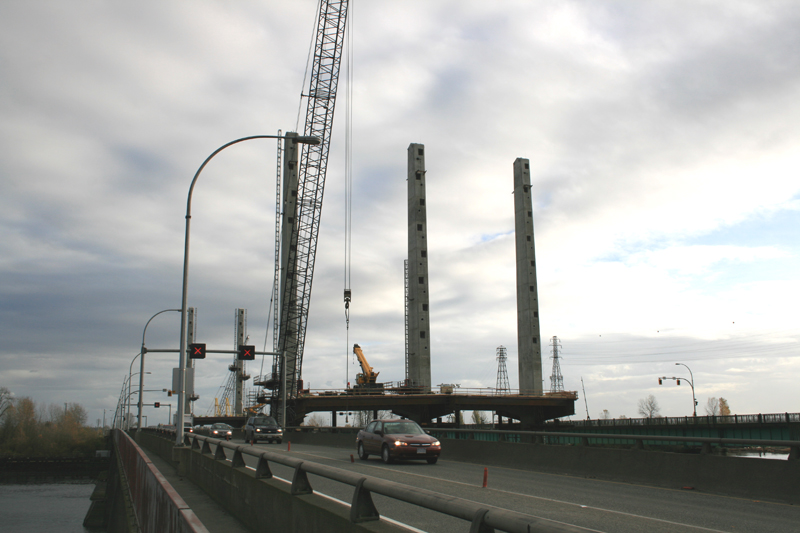
- Coordinates: 49.2484°N 122.7296°W
- Carries: Four lanes of British Columbia Highway 7, Lougheed Highway
- Crosses: Pitt River
- Locale: Port Coquitlam; Pitt Meadows
- Maintained by: British Columbia Ministry of Transportation and Infrastructure
- Followed by: Pitt River Bridge (fourth, 2009)

Characteristics
- Design: swing bridge
- Total length: 333.5 m (1094 ft) (1957); 360.9 m (1184 ft) (1978)

History
- Opened: 21 October, 1957 (Westbound span), 1 August, 1978 (Eastbound span)
- Closed: 4 October, 2009 (demolished November 2010)

Location
- Interactive map of Pitt River Bridge (1957, 1978)

Three road bridges have existed before the modern bridges' construction. The first road bridge was completed in 1915 and opened on the 1st or 2nd of March. It cost $800,000 (equivalent to $20,078,688.52 in 2022). This first road bridge was originally the second Canadian Pacific Railway (CPR) bridge over the Pitt River, a swing bridge that opened in 1907 to replace the original 1880s rail bridge. CPR decided to replace that single-track railway bridge with a new double-track railway bridge. CPR then sold the existing 1907 bridge to the province of British Columbia, which floated that bridge a small distance upstream and converted it into the original road crossing. Before its construction, traffic utilized a government-subsidized ferry, which had started its operation on 27 September 1902.

The second span, a highway bridge was opened on 21 October, 1957 by Premier W. A. C. Bennett and cost $1,050,000 (equivalent $10,861,824.32 in 2022 dollars). The original Pitt River road bridge (second Pitt River rail bridge) was purchased by the Western Canada Steel company and floated downstream along the Fraser River to connect Vancouver and Richmond, BC with its plant on Twigg Island as a road-rail bridge.

The third (northern) span was built in the 1978 at cost of $2.8 million dollars (equivalent to $11,554,716.98 in 2022) and was opened on 1 August by Highways Minister Alex Fraser. It was located to the north of the 1957 bridge.

The mid-swing span of the south span sometimes did not seat properly in the closed position, becoming stuck and causing very long traffic line-ups (especially before the north span was built), but this problem was fixed many years ago. The control house also operated the lane control system after the system became operational.

Each of the two spans had two lanes. In 1997 a counterflow system was installed, being completed on the 10th of October. During the morning and evening commute times, the system would reverse a lane on one of the two bridges so that three lanes of traffic were operational in a single direction. In vogue with the Massey Tunnel's system, the system directed three lanes towards Vancouver in the morning from 6 AM until 8:30 AM, and likewise from 3:30 PM until 6:00 PM towards Maple Ridge.

== New bridge and Mary Hill Interchange Project ==
The original bridges were replaced with a cable-stayed bridge and a free-flowing interchange to replace the Mary-Hill Bypass–Lougheed intersection. On October 4, 2009, four lanes of the new bridge opened to general traffic, soon expanding to three lanes for westbound traffic and four for eastbound traffic. The new span has been engineered to allow for different lane allocations in the future, including an 8th lane and possible rapid transit. It also allows for up to 16 meters of vertical clearance for marine traffic. The new bridge structure was built between the two earlier bridges, which were subsequently demolished; all demolition was completed on November 22, 2010.

== See also ==
- Gateway Program
- List of bridges in Canada
