= Port Mann Bridge =

Bridge over the Fraser River in Metro Vancouver, British Columbia; opened in 2012

Port Mann Bridge (2012)
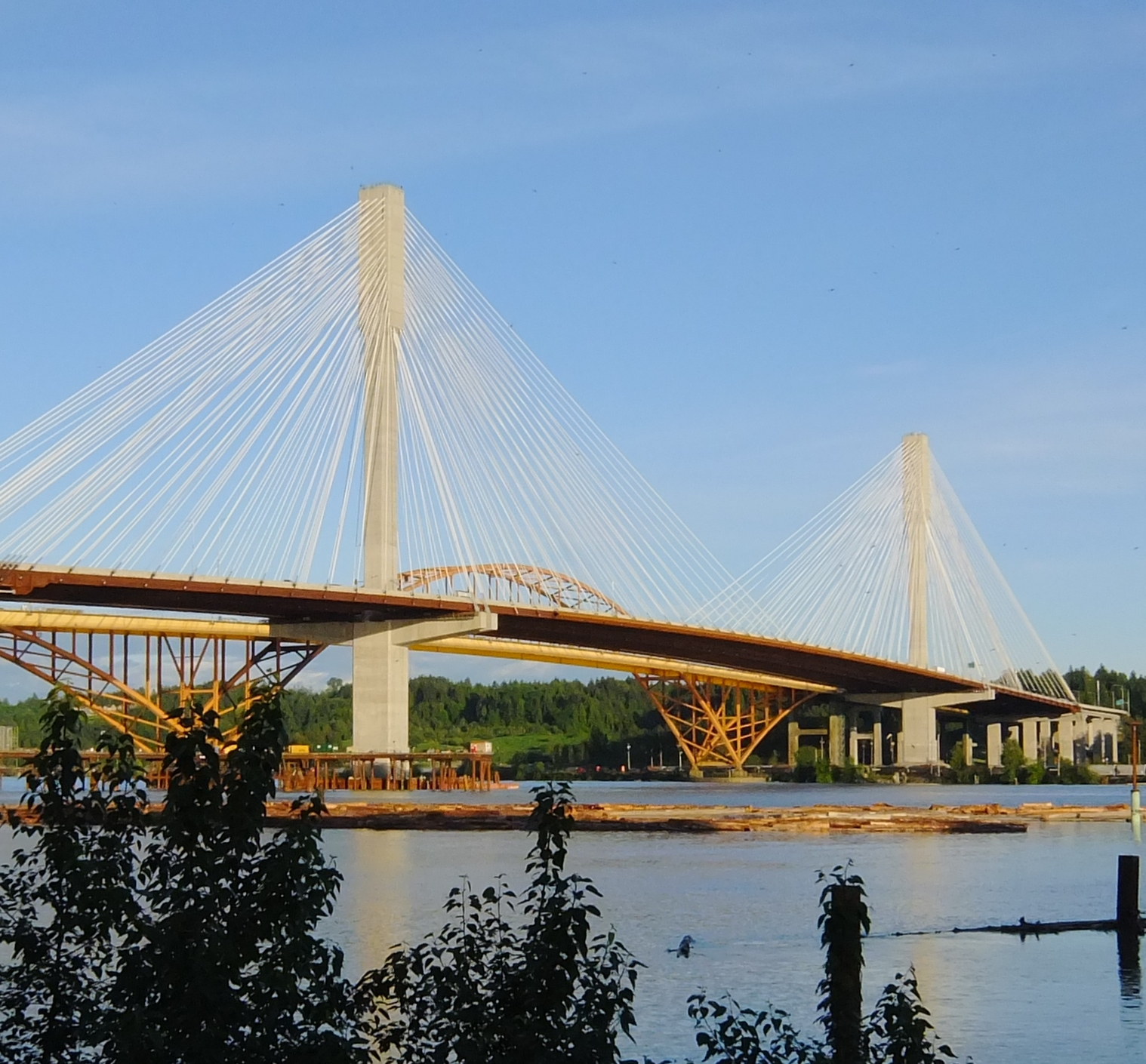
- Coordinates: 49°13′11″N 122°48′47″W
- Carries: Ten lanes of British Columbia Highway 1 (Trans-Canada Highway), pedestrians and bicycles
- Crosses: Fraser River
- Locale: Coquitlam; Surrey
- Maintained by: Transportation Investment Corporation (TI Corp)
- Preceded by: Port Mann Bridge (1964)

Characteristics
- Design: Cable-stayed bridge
- Total length: 2,020 metres (6,630 ft)
- Width: 65 metres (213 ft)
- Height: 163 metres (535 ft)
- Longest span: 470 metres (1,540 ft)
- Clearance below: 42 metres (138 ft)

History
- Designer: T.Y. Lin International International Bridge Technologies
- Construction start: February 4, 2009
- Construction end: September 17, 2015
- Construction cost: $820 million
- Opened: September 18, 2012 (3 eastbound lanes); November 17, 2012 (2 westbound lanes); December 1, 2012 (4 lanes in each direction)

Location
- Interactive map of Port Mann Bridge (2012)

Port Mann Bridge (1964)
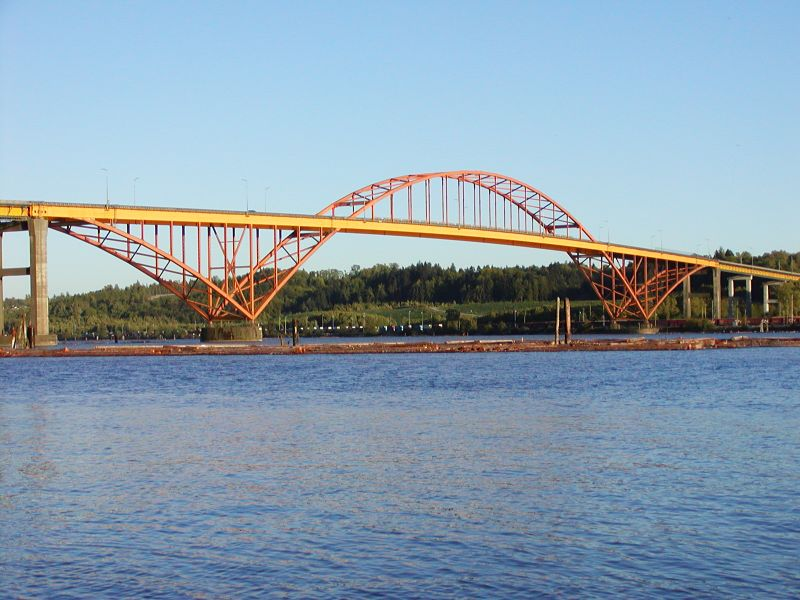
- Coordinates: 49°13′16″N 122°48′47″W
- Carries: Five lanes of British Columbia Highway 1 (Trans-Canada Highway)
- Crosses: Fraser River
- Locale: Coquitlam; Surrey
- Maintained by: British Columbia Ministry of Transportation
- Followed by: Port Mann Bridge (second, 2012)

Characteristics
- Design: Tied-arch bridge
- Total length: 2093 m
- Longest span: 366 m

History
- Designer: CBA Engineering
- Constructed by: Dominion Bridge Company, John Laing and Sons, Perini Pacific, Western Bridge & Steel
- Construction start: 1959
- Construction end: 1963
- Construction cost: $25 million
- Opened: June 12, 1964
- Closed: November 17, 2012 (demolished October 2015)

Location
- Interactive map of Port Mann Bridge (1964)

The Port Mann Bridge is a cable-stayed bridge that crosses the Fraser River in the Greater Vancouver region of British Columbia, Canada. It carries 10 lanes of Highway 1 (itself part of the Trans-Canada Highway) and connects Coquitlam to Surrey. The bridge opened to traffic in 2012 and includes space reserved for a potential light rail line. The bridge carried an average of 179,435 vehicles per day in 2025 and is the busiest bridge in Canada.

The cable-stayed bridge replaced a steel arch bridge that spanned the Fraser River from 1963 to 2012. After its successor was opened to traffic, the old bridge was demolished by reverse construction, a process which took three years to complete.

== Original bridge ==
The original Port Mann Bridge opened on June 12, 1964. It was named after the community of Port Mann, through which the south end of the bridge passed. The old bridge consisted of three spans with an orthotropic deck carrying five lanes (originally four lanes) of Trans-Canada Highway traffic, with approach spans of three steel plate girders and concrete deck. The total length of the arch bridge was 2,093 m (6,867 ft), including approach spans. The main span was 366 m (1,201 ft), plus the two 110 m (360 ft) spans on either side. Volume on the old bridge was 127,000 trips per day. Approximately 8 percent of the traffic on the Port Mann bridge was truck traffic. The old bridge was the longest arch bridge in Canada and third-longest in the world at the time of its inauguration.

At the time of construction, it was the most expensive piece of highway in Canada.

In 2001, an eastbound HOV lane was added by moving the centre divider and by cantilevering the bridge deck outwards in conjunction with a seismic upgrade.

== Replacement ==
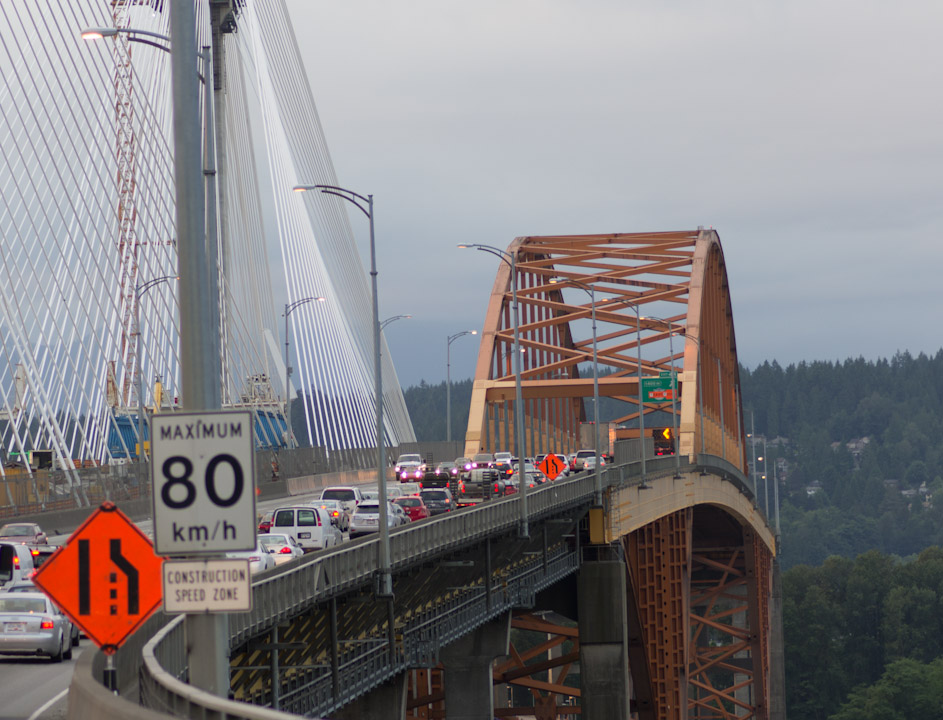
The old Port Mann Bridge with its replacement rising beside it

On January 31, 2006, the British Columbia Ministry of Transportation introduced the Gateway Program as a means to address growing congestion. The project originally envisioned twinning the Port Mann Bridge by building a second bridge adjacent to it, but the project was changed to building a 10-lane replacement bridge, planned to be the widest in the world, and demolishing the original bridge. While the old bridge was found to be in "excellent shape, it is a fracture-critical structure with a tension member that runs the full length of the bridge. If that fractures anywhere, the bridge’s structural safety can be compromised heavily...There is no built-in redundancy [in this type of bridge]. It only takes a little undetected fatigue crack to grow for 10 years and then a member eventually just snaps through one cold morning when the wrong size truck rolls over it”.

=== Opposition to twinning plan ===
A number of groups lobbied to improve public transit rather than build a new bridge. Burnaby city council, Vancouver city council, and directors of the GVRD (now Metro Vancouver) passed resolutions opposing the Port Mann / Highway 1 expansion. Opponents of the expansion included local environmental groups, urban planners, and Washington state's Sightline Institute.

Opponents argued that increasing highway capacity would increase greenhouse gas emissions and only relieve congestion for a few years before increased traffic congested the area again, and that expanding road capacity would encourage suburban sprawl. The Livable Region Coalition urged the Minister of Transportation, Kevin Falcon, to consider rapid transit lines and improved bus routes instead of building the new bridge. The David Suzuki Foundation claimed the plan violated the goals of Metro Vancouver's Livable Region Strategic Plan.

=== Construction and cost ===
The Port Mann / Highway 1 project added another HOV lane along with cycling and pedestrian access. The multi-use pedestrian/bicycle path opened July 1, 2015. A bus service was reintroduced over the Port Mann Bridge for the first time in over 20 years. However, critics claimed that the new bridge only delayed the reintroduction of bus service on the bridge. The new express bus service is now operated in the HOV lanes along Highway 1 from Langley to Burnaby.

The estimated construction cost was $2.46 billion, including the cost of the Highway 1 upgrade, a total of 37 kilometres (23 mi). Of this, the bridge itself comprised roughly a third ($820 million). The total cost, including operation and maintenance, was expected to be $3.3 billion. Now that the new bridge is completed, the existing bridge, which was more than 45 years old, has been taken down.

The project was intended to be funded by using a public-private partnership, and Connect B.C. Development Group was chosen as the preferred developer. The Connect B.C. Group included the Macquarie Group, Transtoll Inc., Peter Kiewit Sons Co., and Flatiron Constructors. Although a memorandum of understanding had been signed by the province, final terms could not be agreed upon. As a consequence, the province decided to fund the entire cost of replacement.

On September 18, 2012, the new Port Mann Bridge opened to eastbound traffic. At 65 metres (213 ft) wide, it was the world's widest long-span bridge, according to the Guinness World Records, overtaking the Sydney Harbour Bridge, which, at 49 metres (161 ft), had held the record since 1932. The new record was itself broken in 2013 by the eastern span replacement of the San Francisco–Oakland Bay Bridge, at 78.74 metres (258.3 ft).

=== Dismantling of original bridge ===
Work to dismantle the old Port Mann Bridge began in December 2012. Crews removed sections of the bridge piece by piece in opposite order in which they were originally constructed, starting with the road deck, followed by the bridge approach's girders, and concluding with the steel arch. It was fully removed by October 21, 2015.

== New bridge ==
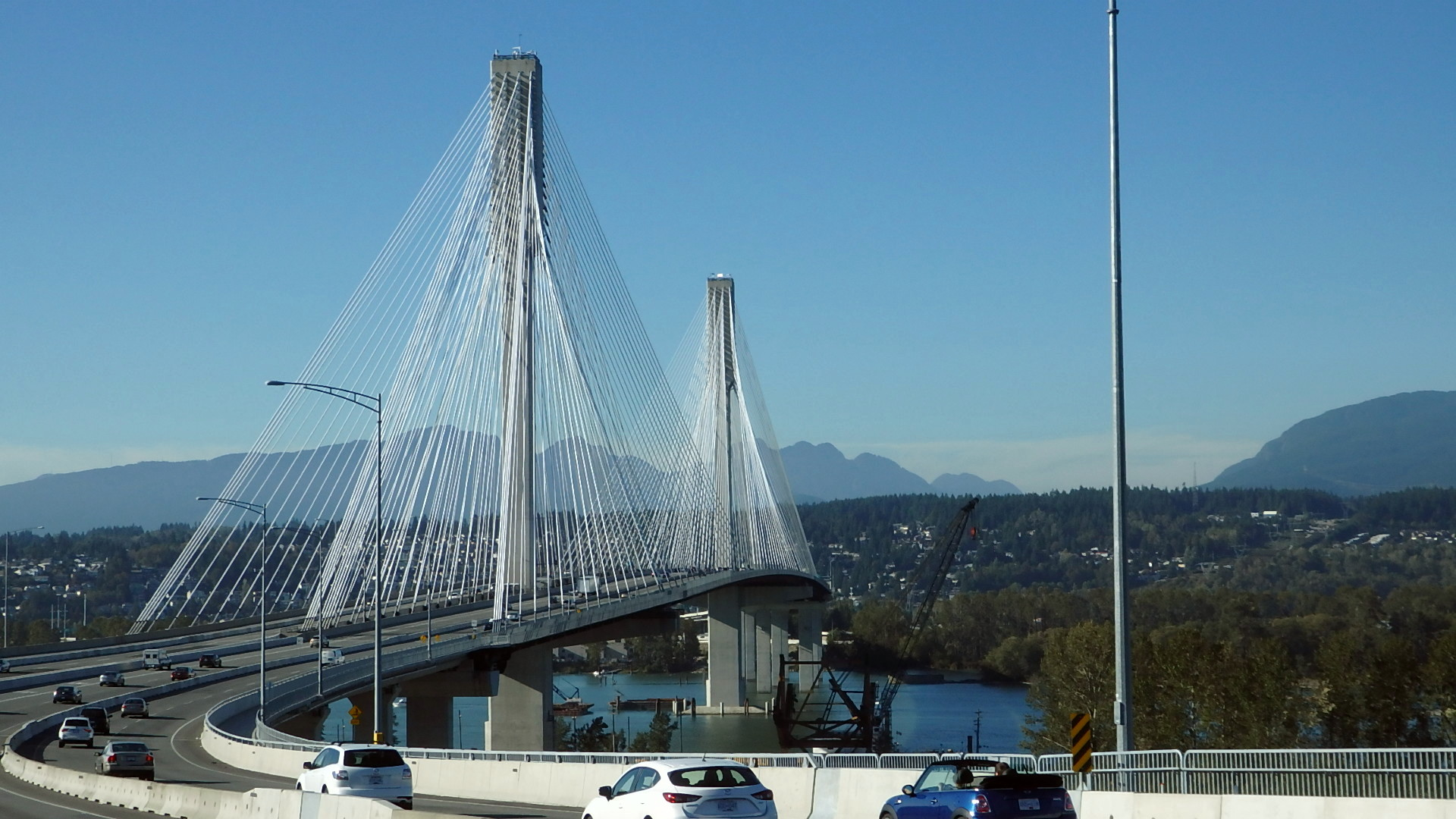
The new Port Mann Bridge with the old bridge fully demolished

The new bridge is 2.02 kilometres (1.26 mi) long, up to 65 metres (213 ft) wide, carries 10 lanes of traffic, and has a 42 metres (138 ft) clearance above the river's high water level (the same length and clearance as the old bridge). The towers are approximately 75 metres (246 ft) tall above deck level, with the total height approximately 163 metres (535 ft) from top of footing. The main span (between the towers) is 470 metres (1,540 ft) long, the second longest cable-stayed span in the western hemisphere. The main bridge (between the end of the cables) has a length of 850 metres (2,790 ft) with two towers and 288 cables. The new bridge was built to accommodate the future installation of light rapid transit.

=== Issues ===
On February 10, 2012, during construction of the replacement bridge, an overhead gantry crane collapsed, causing a 90-tonne concrete box-girder segment to drop into the water below. While no one was injured, the accident delayed subsequent construction. WorkSafeBC inspectors evaluated the safety practices on the construction site.

On December 19, 2012, cold weather caused ice to accumulate on the supporting cables, periodically dropping to the car deck below, dubbed "ice bombs". ICBC, the vehicle insurance entity in British Columbia, reported 60 separate claims of ice damage during the incident. In addition, one driver required an ambulance due to injuries. The RCMP closed the bridge between 1:30 p.m. and 6 p.m. while engineers investigated. The Government installed collars on the cables that are manually released when conditions for ice accumulation are expected. They are installed on the tops of the cables on the towers and are released, falling down the cables by gravity to remove any snow build up.

During December 2016, "slush bombs" affected the bridge again though the BC Government stated that these weren't as severe as the 2012 "ice bombs." During December, the bridge was closed due to the threat of falling snow off of the cables and possible icy conditions.

=== Tolling (2012–2017) ===
In order to recover construction and operating costs, the bridge was electronically tolled when originally built. The toll rates increased to $1.60 for motorcycle, $3.15 for cars, $6.30 for small trucks and $9.45 for large trucks on August 15, 2015. Through increased prices and greater traffic, Transportation Investment Corporation (TI Corp), the public Crown corporation responsible for toll operations on the Port Mann Bridge, forecast its revenue would grow by 85% between fiscal years 2014 and 2017. These fees were assessed using radio-frequency identification (RFID) decals or licence plate photos. A B.C. licensed driver who owes more than $25 in tolls outstanding 90 days is penalized $20 and is unable to purchase vehicle insurance or renew drivers permits without payment of the debt. Out-of-province drivers were also contacted for payment by a US-based contractor. A licence plate processing fee of $2.30 per trip was added to the toll rate for unregistered users who did not pay their toll within seven days of their passage. Monthly passes, which allowed unlimited crossing on the bridge, were available for purchase. Users may have set up an account for online payment of tolls. Users who opted for this method received a decal with an embedded RFID to place on their vehicle's windshield or headlight and avoid paying a processing fee. Tolls were expected to be removed by the year of 2050 or after collecting $3.3 billion. As announced by B.C. Premier John Horgan in August 2017, all tolls on the Port Mann Bridge were removed on September 1, 2017, though despite this the toll equipment remained. Debt service was transferred to the province of British Columbia at a cost of $135 million per year.

| Year | Annual toll revenue | Annual expenditures |
|---|---|---|
| 2012 | $15.0 million | $14.0 million |
| 2013 | $94.0 million | $20.0 million |
| 2014 | $122.0 million | $19.0 million |
| 2015 | $136.0 million | $18.0 million |

=== Traffic volumes ===
==== Monthly mean weekday traffic ====
As of January 2019

| | 2013 | 2014 | 2015 | 2016 | 2017 | 2018 |
|---|---|---|---|---|---|---|
| January | 95,200 | 92,200 | 96,900 | 103,000 | 112,000 | 146,000 |
| February | 100,900 | 94,300 | 101,700 | 107,500 | 111,200 | 149,000 |
| March | 104,000 | 98,200 | 104,000 | 109,900 | 118,600 | 156,000 |
| April | 106,400 | 101,400 | 105,000 | 116,600 | 122,500 | 160,000 |
| May | 107,500 | 103,700 | 108,500 | 132,700 | 123,400 | 163,000 |
| June | 108,900 | 106,300 | 112,300 | 139,100 | 127,800 | 167,000 |
| July | 111,000 | 107,700 | 111,800 | 139,200 | 130,000 | 167,100 |
| August | 112,700 | 110,600 | 112,100 | 140,400 | 133,200 | 158,127 |
| September | 107,600 | 106,600 | 110,900 | 126,300 | 153,700 | 156,443 |
| October | 107,000 | 104,700 | 110,900 | 120,500 | 156,000 | 156,632 |
| November | 102,800 | 101,500 | 107,100 | 119,000 | 151,300 | 150,627 |
| December | 95,000 | 97,500 | 104,100 | 108,700 | 142,900 | 144,223 |

==== Total monthly traffic (in millions) ====
As of January 2019

| | 2013 | 2014 | 2015 | 2016 | 2017 | 2018 |
|---|---|---|---|---|---|---|
| January | 2.78 | 2.66 | 2.74 | 2.89 | 3.08 | 4.21 |
| February | 2.65 | 2.42 | 2.74 | 2.89 | 2.79 | 3.70 |
| March | 3.00 | 2.71 | 2.90 | 3.16 | 3.41 | 4.52 |
| April | 3.01 | 2.83 | 2.94 | 3.27 | 3.29 | 4.45 |
| May | 3.16 | 2.98 | 3.11 | 3.72 | 3.58 | 4.79 |
| June | 3.04 | 2.95 | 3.17 | 3.89 | 3.57 | 4.67 |
| July | 3.33 | 3.18 | 3.24 | 4.00 | 3.75 | 4.84 |
| August | 3.04 | 3.25 | 3.21 | 4.08 | 3.79 | 4.90 |
| September | 3.02 | 3.02 | 3.12 | 3.43 | 4.36 | 4.69 |
| October | 3.02 | 3.05 | 3.23 | 3.36 | 4.49 | 4.85 |
| November | 2.86 | 2.77 | 2.95 | 3.23 | 4.24 | 4.51 |
| December | 2.78 | 2.85 | 3.02 | 3.01 | 4.43 | 4.47 |

== See also ==
- List of crossings of the Fraser River
- List of bridges in Canada
- Tallest structures in Canada
