= List of roads in Vancouver =

The following is a list of major and secondary streets and roads in Vancouver, British Columbia, Canada. The city is organized on a modified east–west/north–south grid pattern (with some allowance for natural contours). Thoroughfares downtown and in a few other locations run in a northeast–southwest/northwest–southeast pattern.

== Major Road Network ==
The following are arterial routes, as defined by TransLink.

=== Downtown ===
- Georgia Street southeast to Main Street
- Howe Street
- Nelson Street northwest to Howe Street
- Seymour Street
- Smithe Street northwest to Howe Street

=== East–west ===
- Hastings Street west to Burrard Street
- McGill Street west to Nanaimo Street
- Dundas Street east to Nanaimo Street
- Powell Street west to Hawks Avenue
- East 1st Avenue
- Terminal Avenue
- Broadway
- West 10th Avenue east to Alma Street
- Grandview Highway west to Nanaimo Street
- 41st Avenue
- 70th Avenue

=== North–south ===
- Boundary Road north to Hastings Street
- Clark Drive north to Powell Street
- Knight Street
- Main Street between Broadway and Georgia Street
- Oak Street north to Broadway
- Cambie Street
- Granville Street

=== Other ===
- Kingsway
- Marine Drive

== Other major thoroughfares ==
=== Downtown ===
- Burrard Street
- Cordova Street
- Davie Street
- Denman Street
- Dunsmuir Street
- Georgia Street
- Pacific Boulevard
- Robson Street
- Thurlow Street

=== East–west (west of Ontario Street) ===
Ontario Street marks the boundary in most of Vancouver between thoroughfares designated "West" and those designated "East" (e.g. East 41st Avenue, West King Edward Avenue).

- 4th Avenue
- 12th Avenue
- 16th Avenue
- King Edward Avenue
- 33rd Avenue
- 41st Avenue (part of Highway 99)
- 49th Avenue
- 57th Avenue
- 70th Avenue

=== North–south (west of Ontario Street) ===
- Alma Street
- Arbutus Street / West Boulevard
- Macdonald Street

=== East–west (east of Ontario Street) ===
- Prior Street / Venables Street
- 2nd Avenue / Great Northern Way / 6th Avenue
- 12th Avenue
- 16th Avenue
- 22nd Avenue west to Nanaimo Street
- 29th Avenue west to Nanaimo Street
- 33rd Avenue
- King Edward Avenue
- 41st Avenue east to Kingsway
- 49th Avenue
- 54th Avenue east to Tyne Street
- 57th Avenue east to Argyle Drive

=== North–south (east of Ontario Street) ===
Dundas Street marks the boundary in most of Vancouver between thoroughfares designated "North" and those to the south (e.g. North Nanaimo Street, North Renfrew Street). Streets to the south are not prefixed as such. West of Lakewood Drive, the only street designated "North" is one block of Dunlevy Avenue, north of Railway Street.

- Main Street
- Fraser Street
- Windsor Street
- Commercial Drive / Victoria Drive
- Nanaimo Street
- Renfrew Street
- Rupert Street / Kerr Street
- Joyce Street
