= Car Free Day Vancouver =

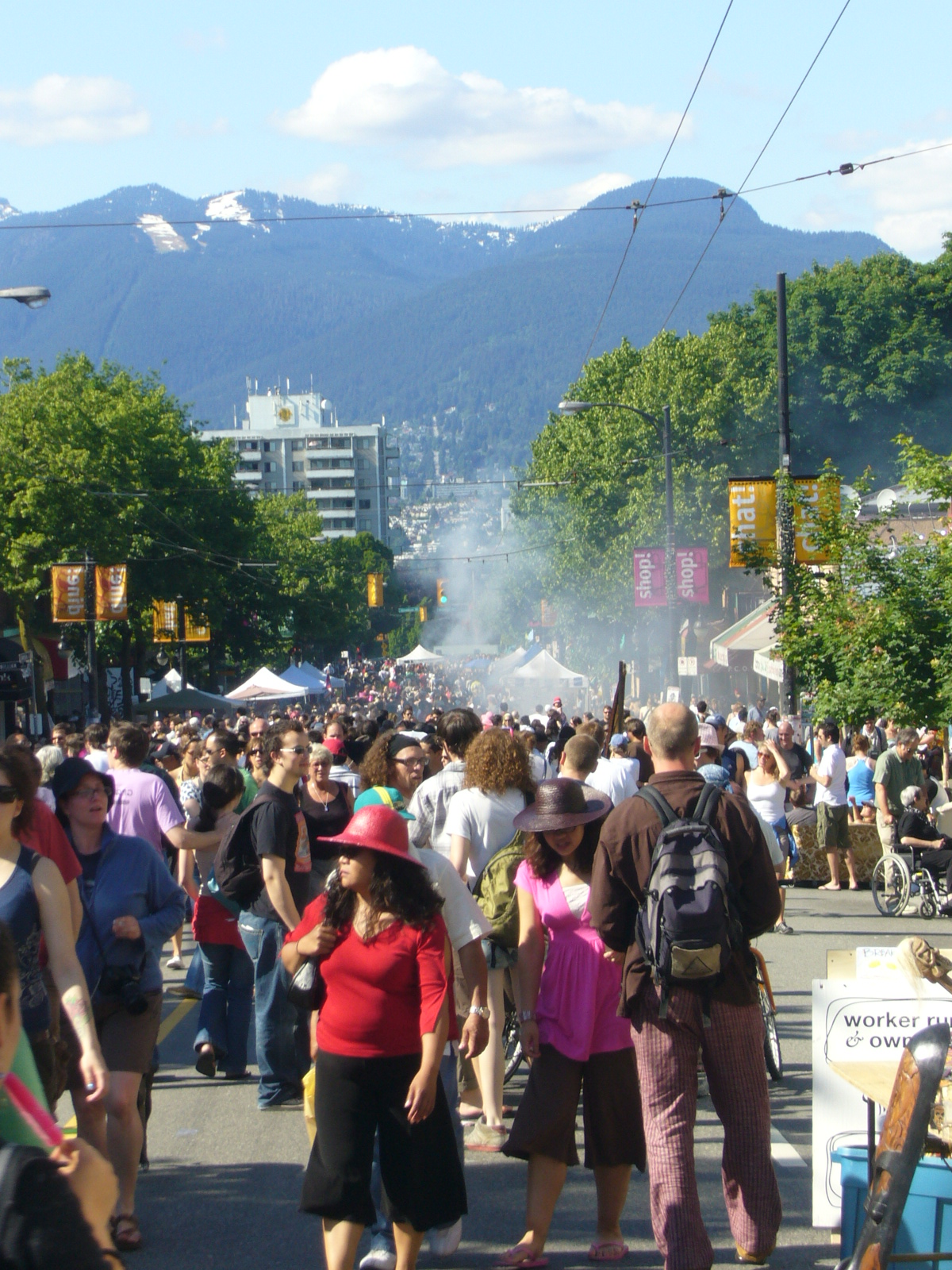
Car Free Day, Commercial Drive, Vancouver, BC, Jun 2008

Car Free Day Vancouver is a community-based, volunteer-run event in Vancouver, British Columbia, which closes busy streets to car traffic and sets up day-long community festivals to promote active transportation, sustainability, and public spaces. It is similar to other Car-Free Days held around the world. It has traditionally taken place once per year on the third Sunday in June (Father's Day). In recent years it has expanded to events on both the Saturday and Sunday, in addition to an event in North Vancouver in August. The neighbourhoods involved often host smaller block parties in conjunction with a large street festival to celebrate. This day eliminates cars from the event sites along major streets and encourages people in these communities to interact with each other in the spirit of reducing carbon emissions. The larger street festivals include many non-profit organizations, artisans, artists, businesses, and food vendors. Some festivals also include live performances ranging from musical guests, to spoken word, to dance and more. The goals of these events are to remind people of their ecological impact on the city, to decrease dependence on personal vehicles as transportation within the city, to encourage active and alternative forms of transportation, and to help people see streets as public spaces for all.

== History ==
Vancouver's Car Free Day began with the Commercial Drive Festival on June 19, 2005, an idea conceived by activist Carmen Mills and author and university lecturer Matt Hern as a protest against the provincial government's Gateway Program, a highway expansion project that opponents argued would only increase congestion over time (due to induced demand). It was run and organized completely by volunteers, consisting of 30 main organizers along with 300 more volunteers. In its first year of operation, over 25,000 people were in attendance.

== Local involvement ==
There are now four neighbourhoods that regularly participate in Car Free Day: Kitsilano, Main Street, Commercial Drive and West End. There is a fifth event organized by the Car Free Vancouver Society in North Vancouver.

Commercial Drive is the origin of Vancouver's Car Free Day, which first took place in 2005. The 2015 festival marked the 11th anniversary of Car Free Day on Commercial Drive. The 20 Victoria/Downtown bus, which provides service along Commercial Drive, is rerouted from Commercial Drive around the festivities.

The Main Street Car Free Day event is the largest of Vancouver's Car Free Day events. The event hosts a variety of entertainment including local artisans, musical performers, spoken word, and food vendors. The Main Street Car Free Day spans 21 blocks, from Broadway to King Edward Avenue, creating car-free zones suitable for smaller block parties. Attendance at Vancouver's Car Free Day events has been increasing year-over-year and in 2015, attendance at all four sites totalled 400,000.

The West End holds similar events to both the Commercial Drive and Main Street Car Free Days on the Saturday preceding these two events. This event allows for the festival to overtake a main street with performances, vendors and artisans.

The community in Kitsilano takes a slightly different approach to the popular Vancouver Car Free Day. Instead of closing major streets to host the festival, the neighbours organize and host their own block parties. This gives people the chance to come together as a community and spend time interacting, playing games, and relaxing in an otherwise busy city. The activities at these block parties differ greatly since each event is entirely independent of the next, but popular choices include road hockey, music and dancing, and relaxing in chairs or on couches. In 2012, Kitsilano hosted a total of 16 block parties, followed by 13 in 2013. Kitsilano Car Free Day is supported by the Car Free Day Vancouver Society, Vancouver Foundation, and the City of Vancouver. The organizers and hosts of these block parties receive small grants given out by the Vancouver Foundation through their Neighbourhood Small Grants program.
