= McGill Street =

McGill Street may refer to:

- McGill Street (Montreal), in Montreal, Quebec
- McGill Street (Vancouver), in Vancouver, British Columbia

== See also ==
- McGill College Avenue
