= Burrard Bridge =

Burrard Street Bridge
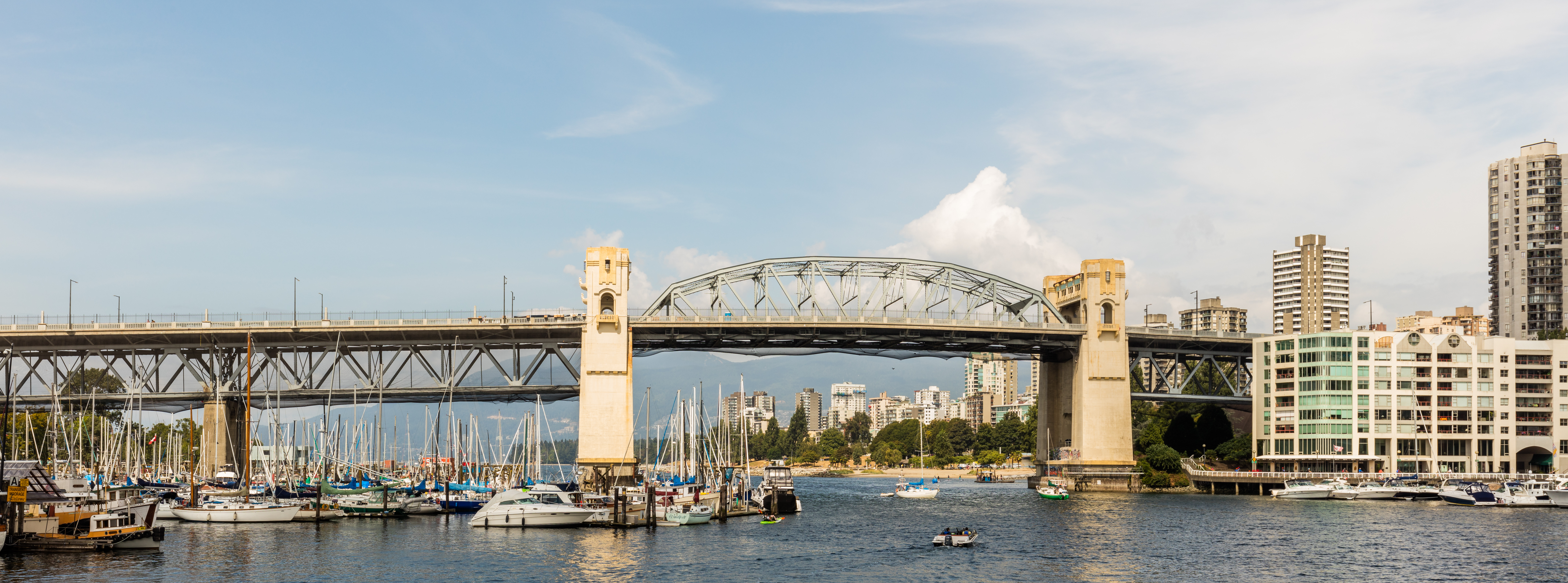
- Coordinates: 49.2754°N 123.1366°W
- Carries: 4 lanes of Burrard Street; Pedestrians and bicycles
- Crosses: False Creek
- Locale: Vancouver
- Maintained by: City of Vancouver

Characteristics
- Design: truss bridge
- Total length: 836 metres (2,743 ft)
- Longest span: 89.6 metres (294 ft)

History
- Opened: July 1, 1932

Location
- Interactive map of Burrard Street Bridge

The Burrard Bridge (officially the Burrard Street Bridge) is a four-lane, Art Deco style, steel truss bridge constructed between 1930 and 1932 in Vancouver, British Columbia, Canada. The high, five-part bridge on four piers spans False Creek, connecting downtown Vancouver with Kitsilano via connections to Burrard Street (formerly Cedar Street south of False Creek) on both ends. It is one of three bridges crossing False Creek. The other two bridges are the Granville Street Bridge, 0.5 kilometres (0.31 mi) to the southeast, and the Cambie Bridge, about 2 kilometres (1.2 mi) to the east. In addition to the vehicle deck, the Burrard Bridge has 2.6 m (8 ft 6 in) wide sidewalks and a dedicated cycling lanes on both sides.

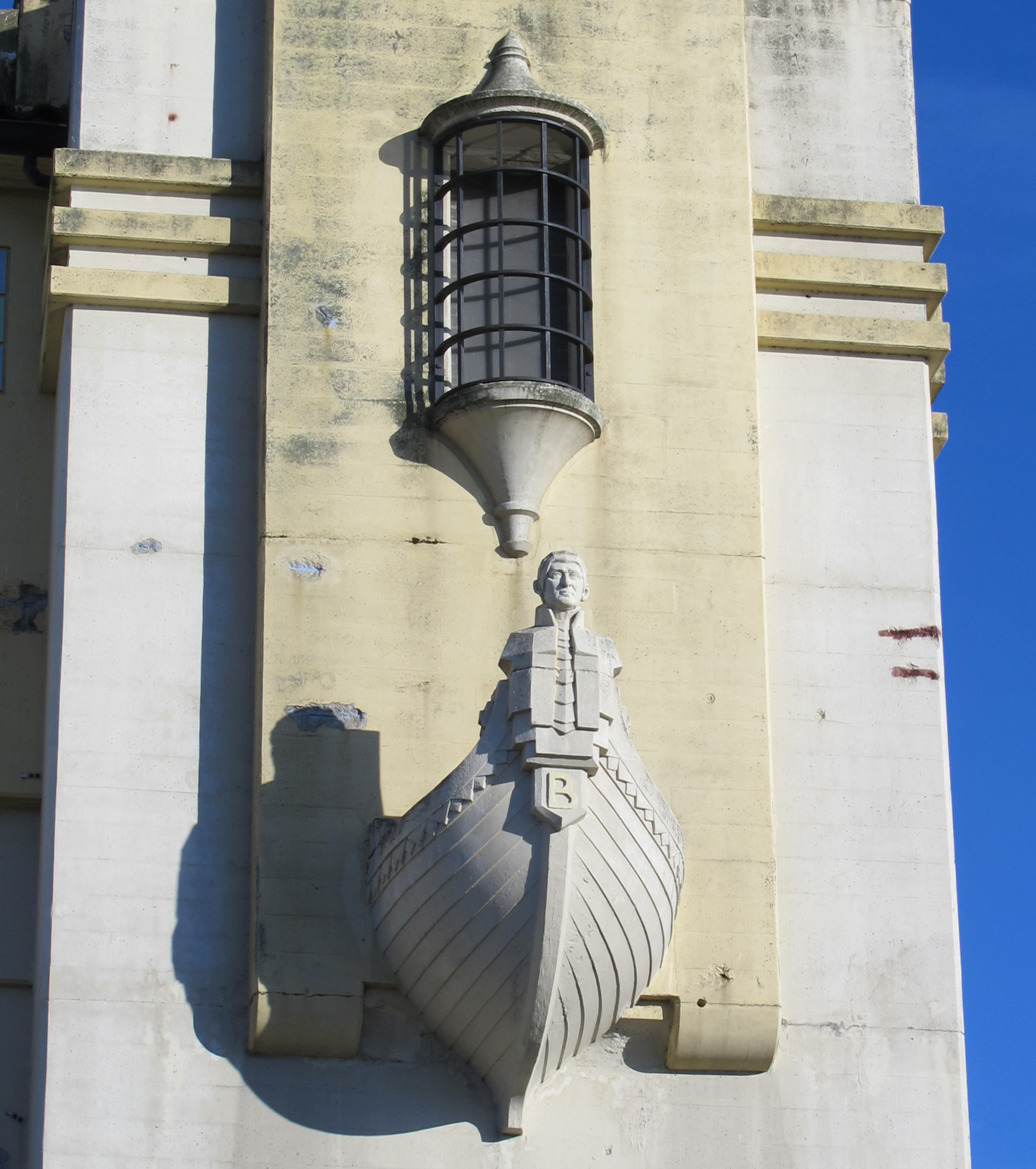
Figurehead sculpture of Sir Harry Burrard-Neale by Charles Marega. Letter 'B' on prow.

The architect of the Burrard Street Bridge was George Lister Thornton Sharp, the engineer John R. Grant. The bridge's two close approach spans are Warren trusses placed below deck level, while its central span is a Pratt truss placed above deck level to allow greater clearance height for ships passing underneath. The central truss is hidden when crossing the bridge in either direction by vertical extensions of the bridge's masonry piers into imposing concrete towers, connected by overhead galleries, which are embellished with architectural and sculptural details that create a torch-like entrance of pylons. Busts of Captain George Vancouver and Sir Harry Burrard-Neale in ship prows jut from the bridge's superstructure (a V under Vancouver's bust, a B under Burrard's).

Unifying the long approaches and the distinctive central span are heavy concrete railings, originally topped with decorative street lamps. These pierced handrails were designed as a kind of visual shutter (stroboscopic effect), so that at a speed of 50 km/h motorists would see through them with an uninterrupted view of the harbour. The effect works at speeds from about 40 to 64 km/h.

== History ==
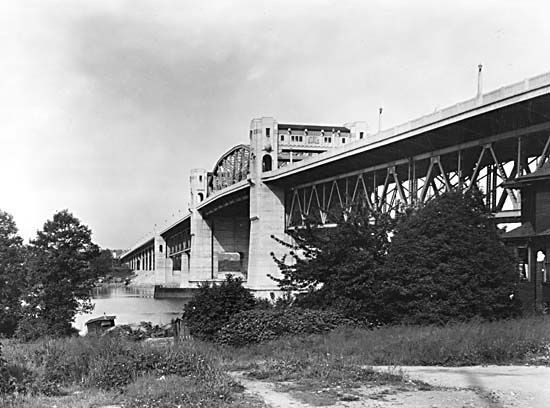
Burrard Bridge circa 1932, with original street lamps.

The Burrard Street Bridge, opened July 1, 1932, was built to provide a high-level crossing from Vancouver to the southwestern neighbourhoods in Kitsilano, by connecting Burrard Street to Cedar Street. After completion, Burrard was extended through to the base of downtown and Cedar Street disappeared.

A snip of a pair of golden scissors in the hands of Mayor Louis D. Taylor, and Vancouver's $3 million Burrard Street Bridge was opened to the public Friday afternoon, July 1 ... Hardly was the ribbon cut in front of the devouring eyes of movie cameras, then thousands of pedestrians and hundreds of cars surged across the magnificent white structure in a procession of triumph, celebrating another step in Vancouver's progress

— Unknown news report

At the opening ceremony, entertainment was provided by two bands, the Kitsilano Boy's Band and the Fireman's Band. An RCAF seaplane flew under the bridge and later a sugar replica of the bridge was unveiled at the civic reception in the Hotel Vancouver.

G.L. Thornton Sharp, of Sharp and Thompson, was the architect responsible for the distinctive towers on the bridge and its middle galleries. "Both central piers," Sharp told a reporter, "were designed and connected with an overhead gallery across the road. This helped to mask the network of steel in the truss from the two approaches, and has been treated as an entrance gateway to the city." Along their other axis, the full height of the piers above the water also serve to frame a sea entrance gateway, notably for pleasure craft: "by sea and land we prosper". The piers have provision for a rapid transit vertical lift span beneath the highway deck, never installed.

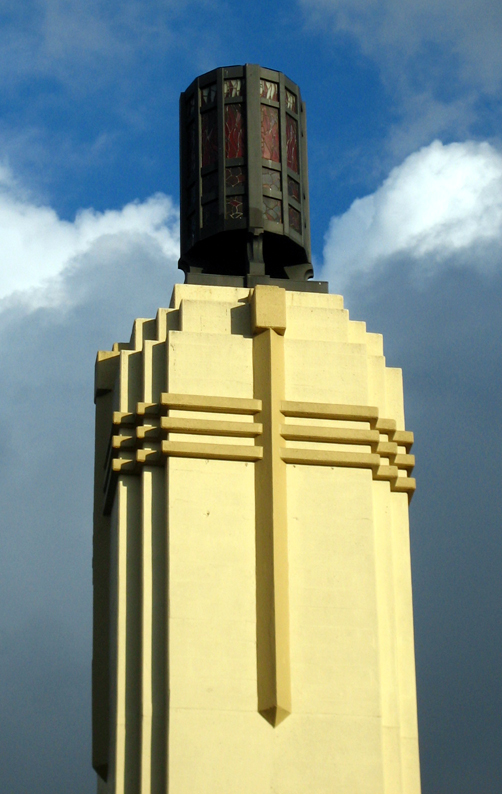
As a tribute to Canadian World War I prisoners of war, who huddled around open fires in their prison camps, John Grant had the idea to install huge lamps at both ends of the span. For placement of the lamps:.

== Recognition ==
Burrard Street Bridge has been assessed by heritage consultants retained by the City of Vancouver as being in the top category of historic buildings in Vancouver. The bridge appeared on a stamp issued by Canada Post in 2011, in a series showcasing five notable Art Deco structures in Canada.

== Proposed bicycle lanes or widening ==
When constructed, the Burrard Street Bridge did not have dedicated lanes for cyclists, who shared the bridge's six vehicle lanes with motorists. Later, as traffic volume grew and speed limits were increased on the bridge to 60 km/h, cyclists were directed to share the bridge's sidewalks with pedestrians. Over time, the volume of pedestrians and cyclists on the 2.6 m (8 ft 6 in) sidewalks created a dangerous situation, with several accidents occurring, which resulted in at least one successful lawsuit against the city.

Since the mid-1990s, the city of Vancouver has investigated various options to rectify the situation. The two most prominent options were 1) to introduce bicycle lanes on the bridge's vehicle deck by reallocating one or more vehicle lanes, and 2) to build horizontal extensions on the outside of the bridge to create additional sidewalk space. Other options have included building an entirely new pedestrian and/or cyclist only bridge, and building another deck on the bridge below the existing deck.

Heritage advocates have been strongly opposed to the construction of outside sidewalk extensions, which would likely alter significantly the historical character of the bridge. Fiscal conservatives have also been opposed to high costs associated with this option.

Many motorists and others opposed reallocation of vehicle lanes to bicycle lanes, believing that the reduction in vehicle carrying capacity would create excessive traffic problems both on the bridge and on and around alternate crossings, such as the Granville Street Bridge, but this has not occurred. As of 2023, the bike lanes are some of the busiest in North America.

=== Timeline ===
Beginning March 26, 1996, in a six-month trial by the City, one commuter lane was closed to automobile traffic and made into a temporary cycling lane. However, after one week, the City was forced to revert the lane to its original purpose, due to outrage by some motorists.

On May 31, 2005, a detailed engineering and planning report was presented to Council, reviewing the situation broadly, presenting alternatives, and offering recommendations. (Its computer visualizations of various proposals [esp. pp. 8–12—notably p. 8—and Appendix E] are indispensable illustrations to the discussion. See)

That day Vancouver City Council voted 10–1 not to follow the recommendations of the report, but to reallocate the two curb-side lanes to cyclists for another trial, as part of Council's plan to increase cycling in Vancouver by 10 percent for the 2010 Winter Olympics.

The issue was carried into the municipal election of November 19, 2005.

On December 20, 2005, the newly elected Council voted 6-4 to cancel the lane reallocation trial and to proceed directly to widening the bridge sidewalks as promised in that election.

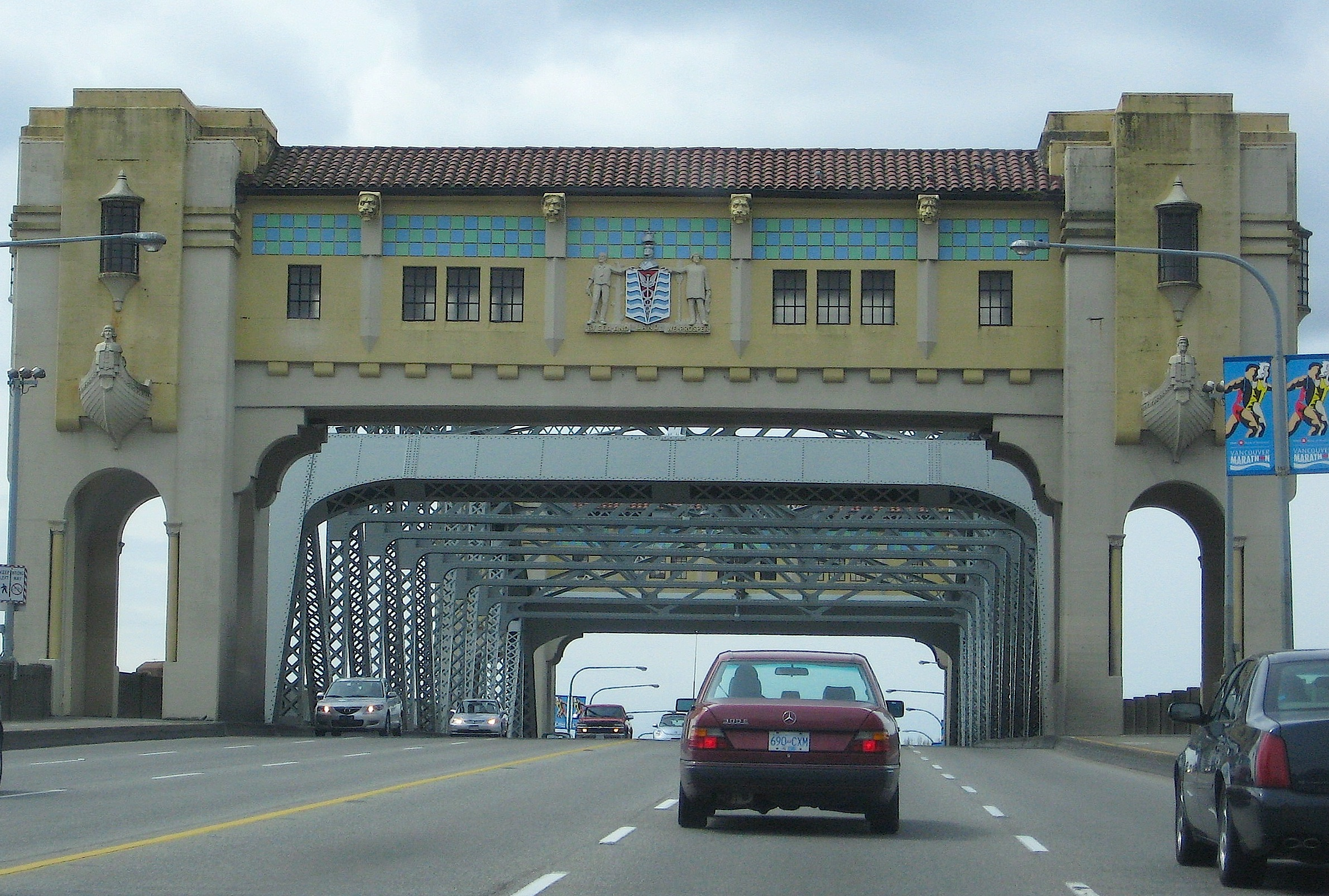
East (city) pylon with decorations, masking steel through-truss; six traffic lanes, pedestrian arches, concrete railings

In 2006, the City considered removing the concrete railings and widening the bridge deck by outward ('outrigger') sidewalks, at projected cost of over $40 million. (See p. 8 of) To preserve the bridge's heritage value, such cantilevered structures would not include the bridge's central piers, or towers. Critics of this plan argued that the resulting "pinch points" would defeat the purpose of widening the bridge by creating bottlenecks, through which a greater number of cyclists, skaters and pedestrians must pass over coming decades.

For the third consecutive year, in 2008 Heritage Vancouver listed the Burrard Bridge first on its Top Ten endangered sites in Vancouver. It had ranked fourth in 2005.

Sidewalk expansion was delayed by the Squamish First Nation, which controls the land directly under the south (or west) side of the bridge. For construction to begin, the city would require permission from this group, which has expressed concern that machinery working on the site may affect their land.

The Squamish First Nation erected advertising billboards on their properties, located at that bridge approach, and is proposing the same for similar properties by the Lions' Gate Bridge and the Ironworkers Memorial Second Narrows Crossing.

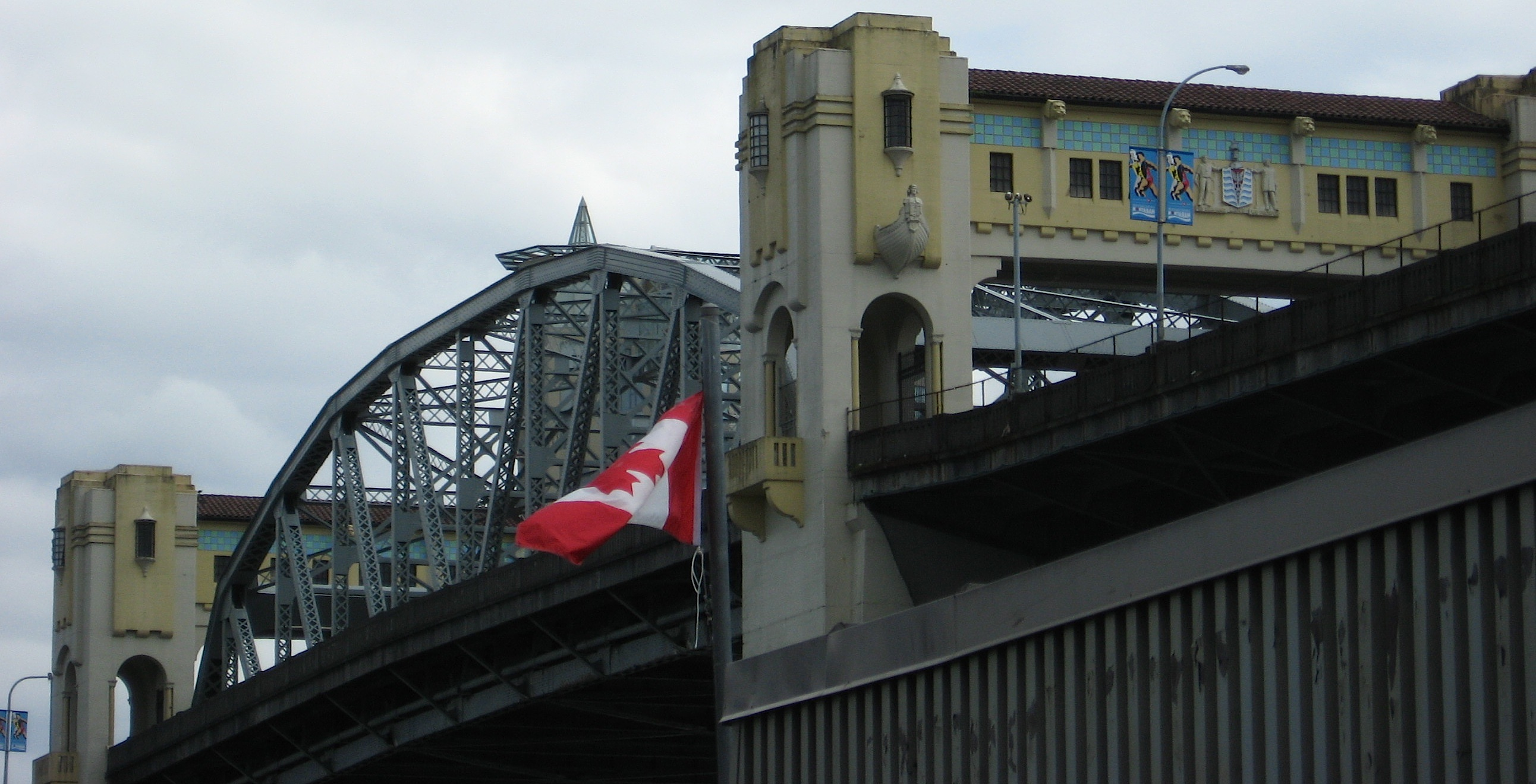
Oblique view from southwest (Kitsilano) quadrant, showing existing change of line between central and approach spans, relative to deck grade-level, 'outrigger', cantilevered widening plan

In a late April 2008 report to Council, city engineers raised the estimated cost of widening to $57 million, due to reconsideration of the additional weight to the existing bridge structure and rising construction costs. $61 million was set as a more likely figure.

In Nov. 2008 the current Council, which advocated widening the bridge, was defeated and replaced by a new mayor and Council opposed to the widening but supportive of lane reallocation from vehicles to cyclists. In late January 2009, in an economic downturn and anticipating the 2010 Winter Olympics, the City announced plans for trials of three kinds of auto traffic lane closings, allowing bicycle use of the road surface. This would be supplemented by safety upgrades.

In March 2009, the City of Vancouver delayed discussing the Burrard Bridge Bike Lane Trial at least one month. Council rescheduled the meeting to May 5, 2009, to discuss the three kinds of possible trials, to begin summer 2009, where one approved.

On May 7, 2009, Council approved a motion to proceed with option 3 of the proposed trials, to begin in June 2009. The proposed trial began on July 13. It saw the southbound motor-vehicle curb lane and the northbound-side sidewalk allocated to bicycles, with the southbound-side sidewalk allocated to pedestrians. The reassigned lane was separated from motor vehicles by a physical barrier. As part of the trial, traffic pattern changes to accommodate feeder bicycle traffic were also completed on Pacific St., next to the North bridgehead, over complaints from local merchants that cited lack of consultation and possible negative impacts on their businesses. Three days into the trial, a local merchant reported a 46% drop in sales compared to the same days the year before. Six weeks into the trial another local merchant reported a 25% drop in sales, and a local restaurant reported a 30% drop in sales.

Regarding effects on three kinds of traffic: two weeks into the trial, the City of Vancouver released a data report showing daily bicycle travel across the bridge had increased by an average of 30%. The same report indicated little change in pedestrian trips, a slight drop in motor vehicle trips, but no change in motor vehicle travel times between 12th Avenue and Georgia Street along Burrard via the bridge.

In July 2009 a website allowing people to register opposition to the bike lane trial was set up by local realtor and former NPA parks candidate Keith Roy at www.unblockthebridge.ca.

(On August 24, 2009, the Vancouver Police Department announced a sharp increase in bicycle theft, with the first three weeks of August experiencing a 53 percent increase over 2008, however, VPD spokesperson Constable Jana McGuinness denied a link between the rise in theft and the lane reallocation trial.)

By 2019, the bike lane on the Burrard Bridge had become the busiest bike lane in North America. The Downtown Business Improvement Association, which had originally opposed the conversion of vehicle lanes into bike lanes, stated that it endorsed cycling infrastructure because many employees and customers bike to downtown businesses.

== Electronic billboard ==
In December 2009 the Squamish First Nation erected an electronic billboard on their land adjacent to the south end of the bridge on the west side. It is visible to traffic travelling in both directions on the bridge and each screen (one for each direction) measures 9 metres wide x 3 metres tall. The advertisements will cycle every ten seconds. There has been controversy and protest from neighbouring residents who claim the billboard is unsightly, blocks view corridors of the mountains and even that it is a dangerous distraction to drivers. There are at least five other similar billboards going up near the Lions Gate Bridge and Ironworkers Memorial Second Narrows Crossing as well as near the Stawamus Chief on Highway 99. The billboards were approved by the federal government. Local and regional governments have acknowledged they have no control over what is done on native reserve lands. The Squamish Nation has said that the purpose of the billboards is primarily to make money.

== PCB contamination ==
There continues to be a significant problem with PCB contaminants at the bridge; in 2012 Vancouver City Council allocated $14 million in funding over two years to the removal of PCB contaminants from the Burrard and Granville bridges.

== Photos of the bridge ==
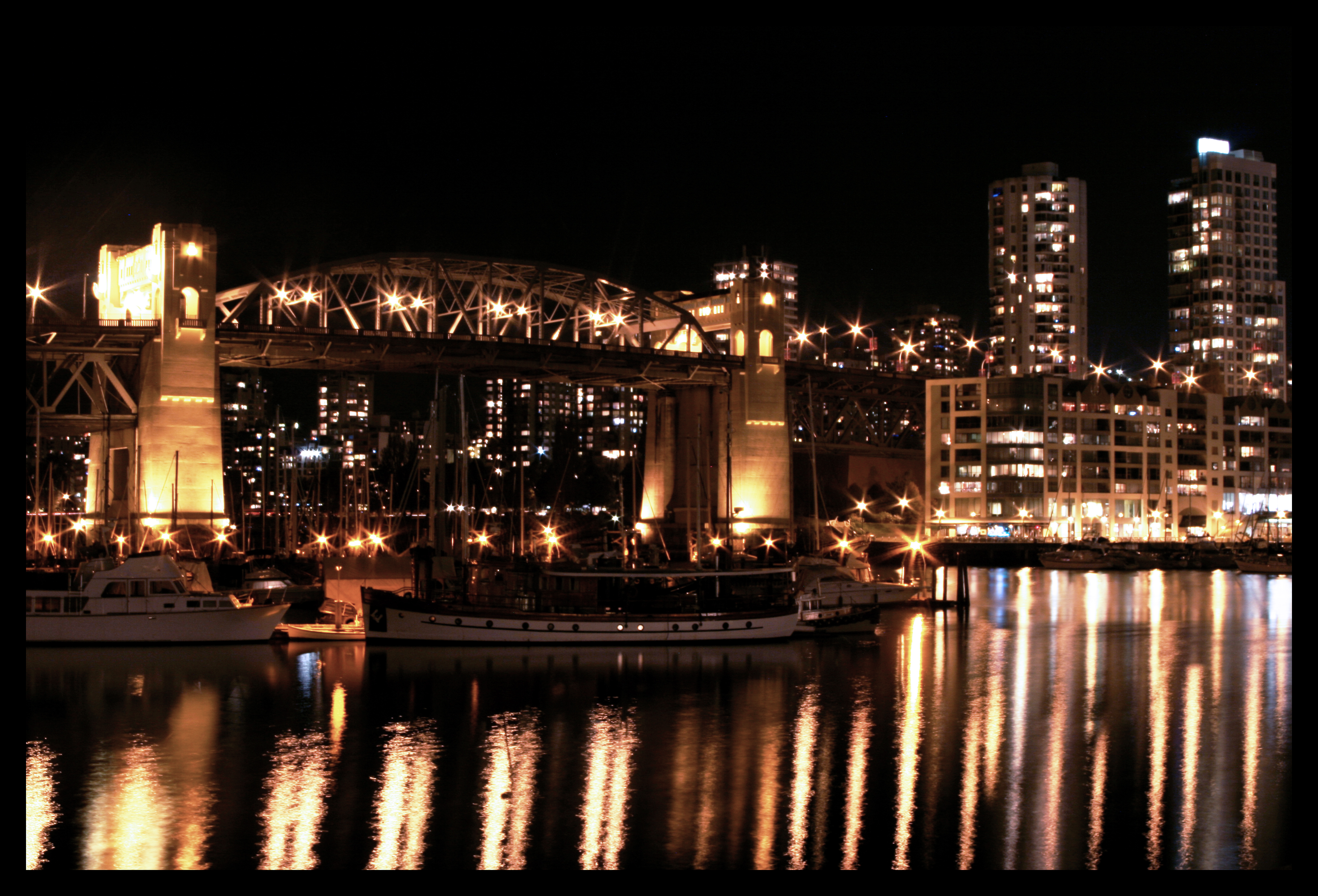
Burrard Bridge at night

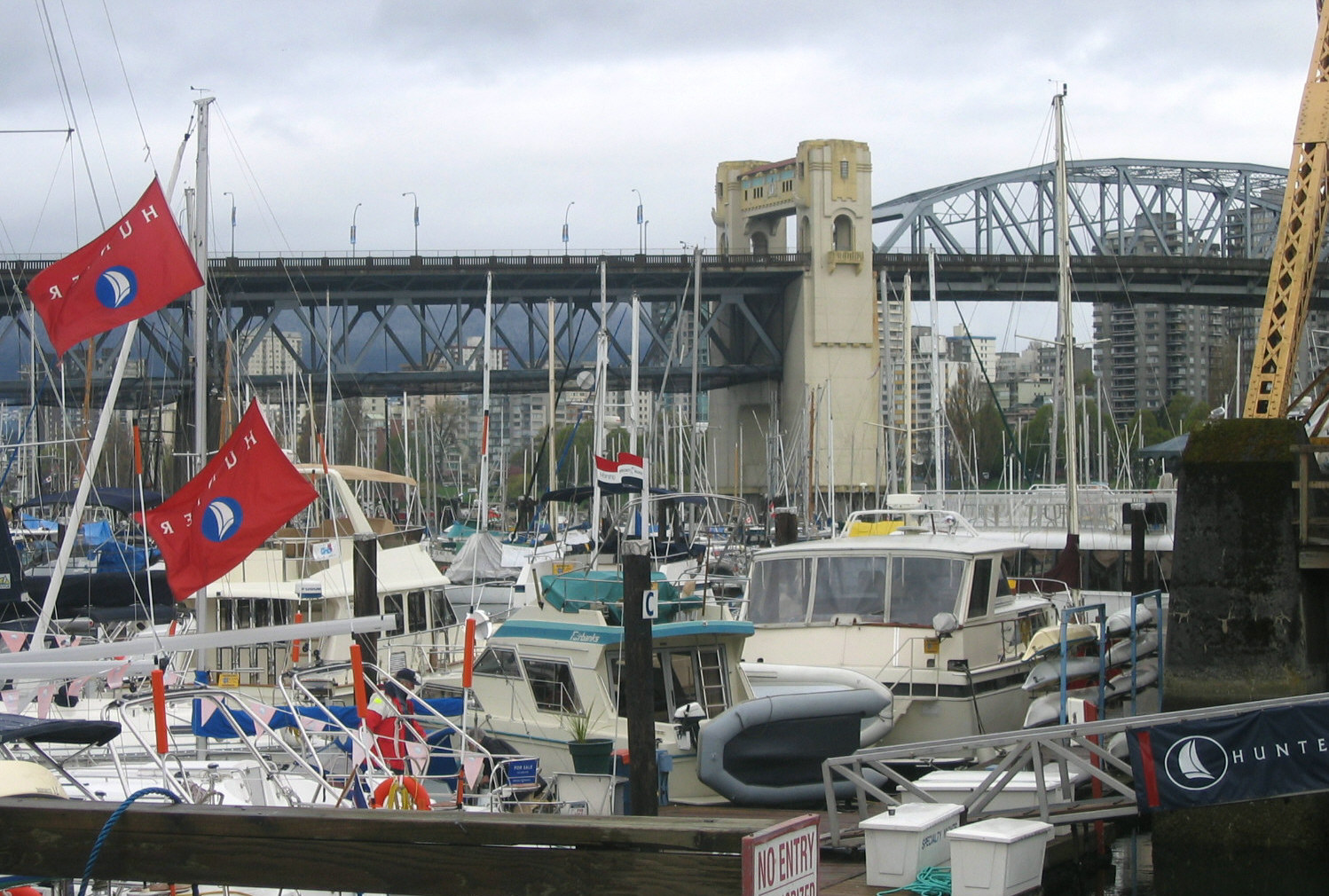
View of Kitsilano and central spans of Burrard Bridge, from dock level, marina, southwest quadrant

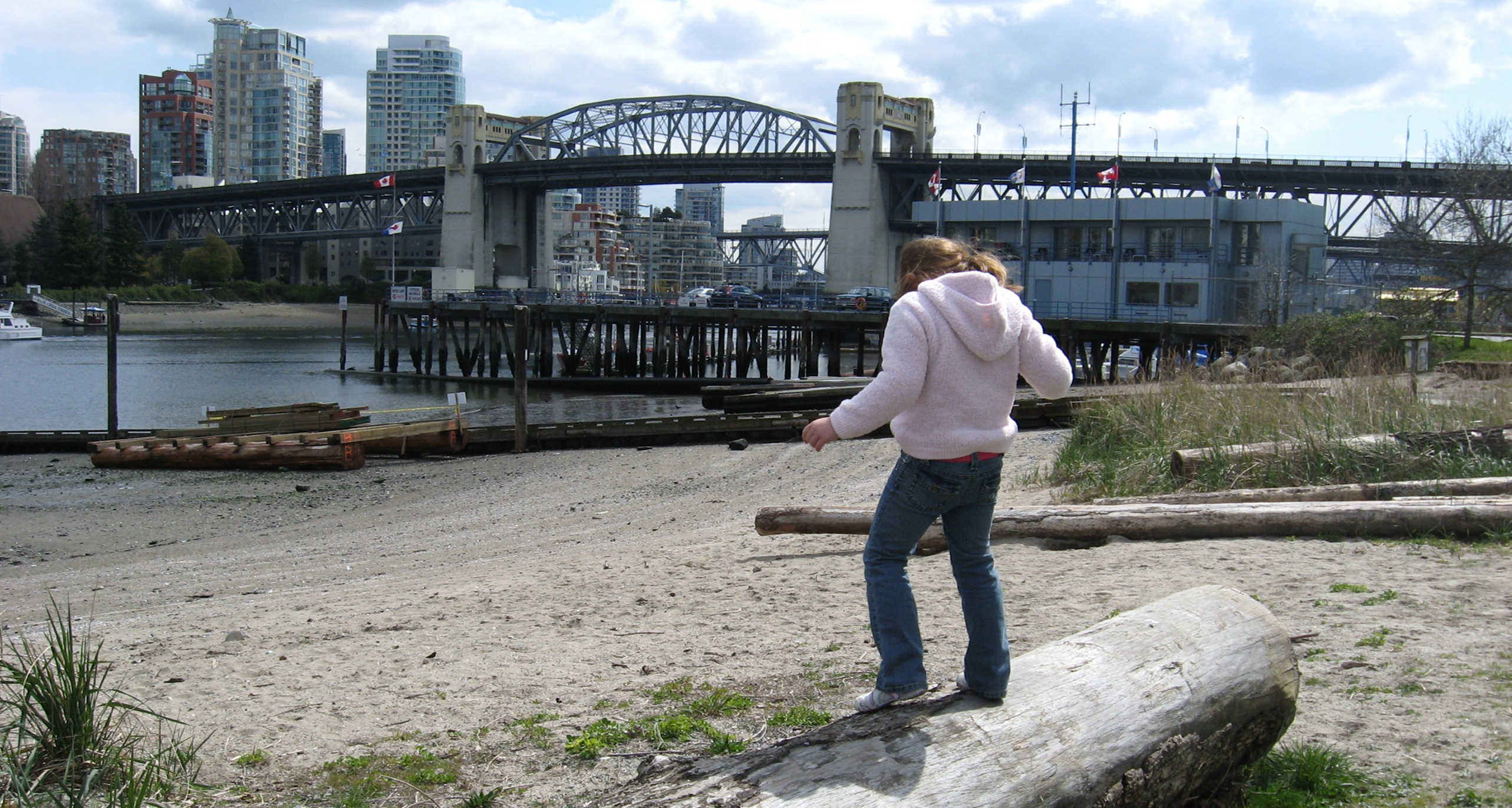
Vanier Park view (nw quadrant) of Bridge, showing: debated elevation appearance, proximity to downtown and to Granville Street Bridge beyond-Photo PM

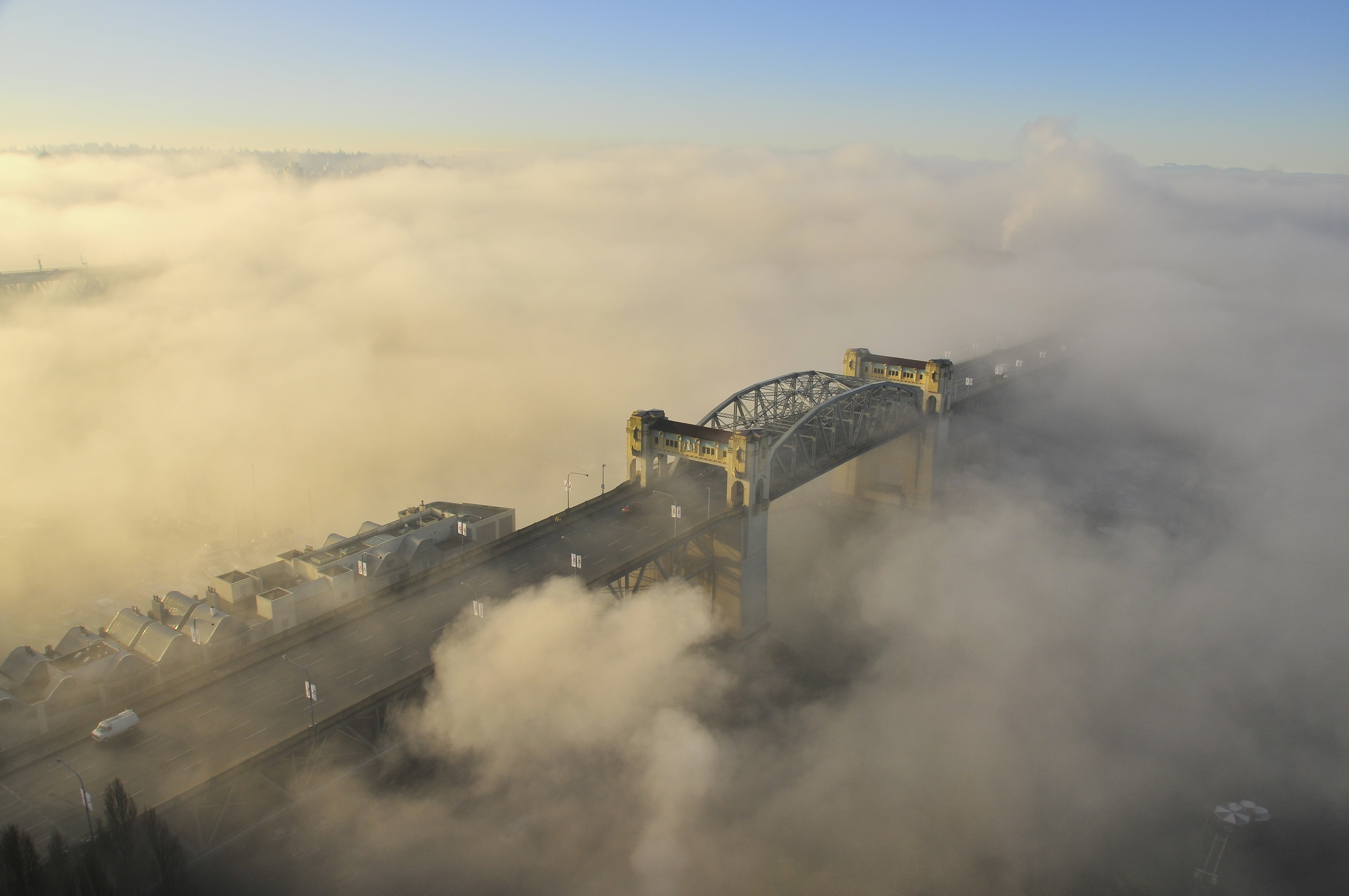
The bridge shrouded in a cool winter sunrise fog.

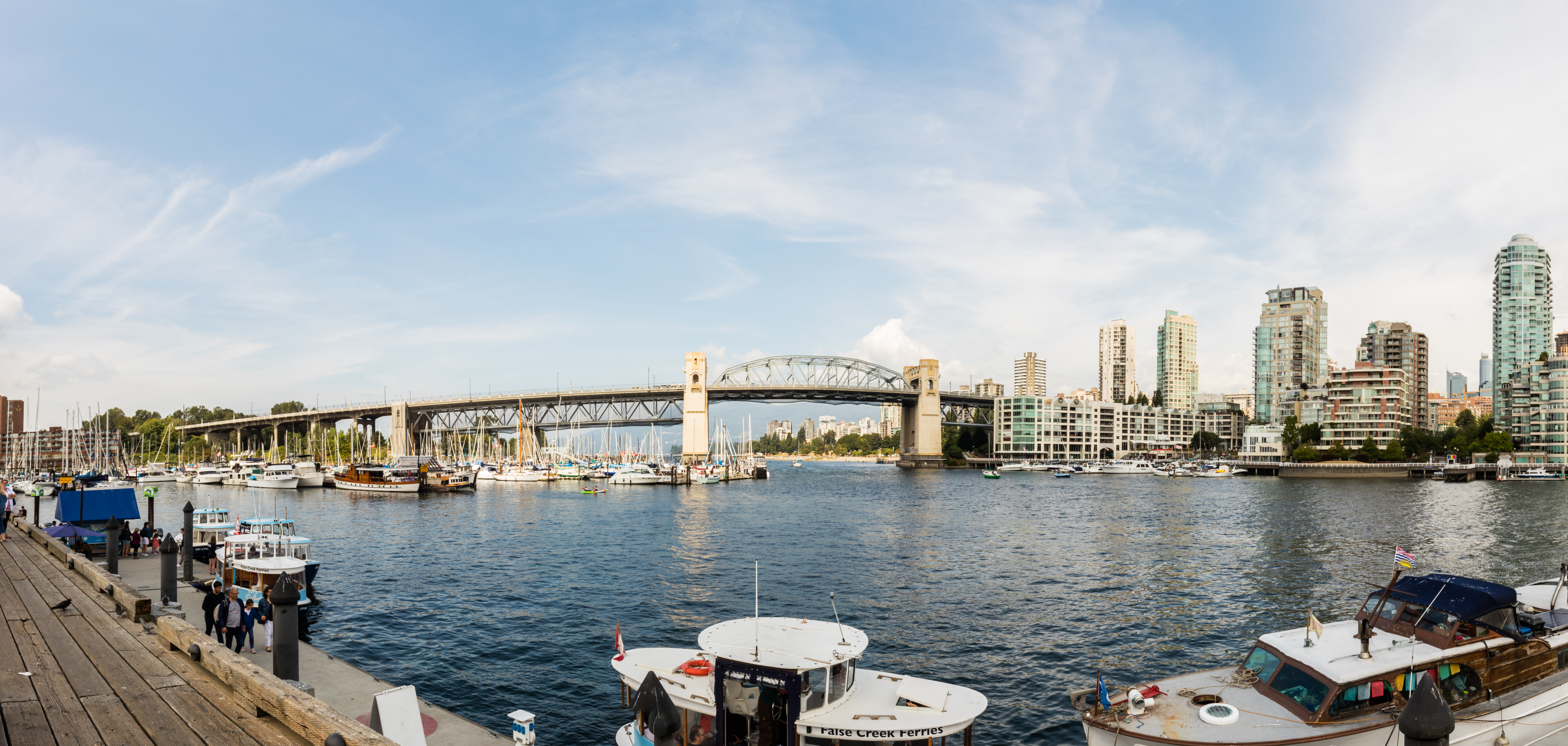
Panoramic view of the bridge.

== See also ==
- Burrard Street
- List of bridges in Canada
