= Greektown, Vancouver =

Coordinates: 49°15′51″N 123°10′05″W

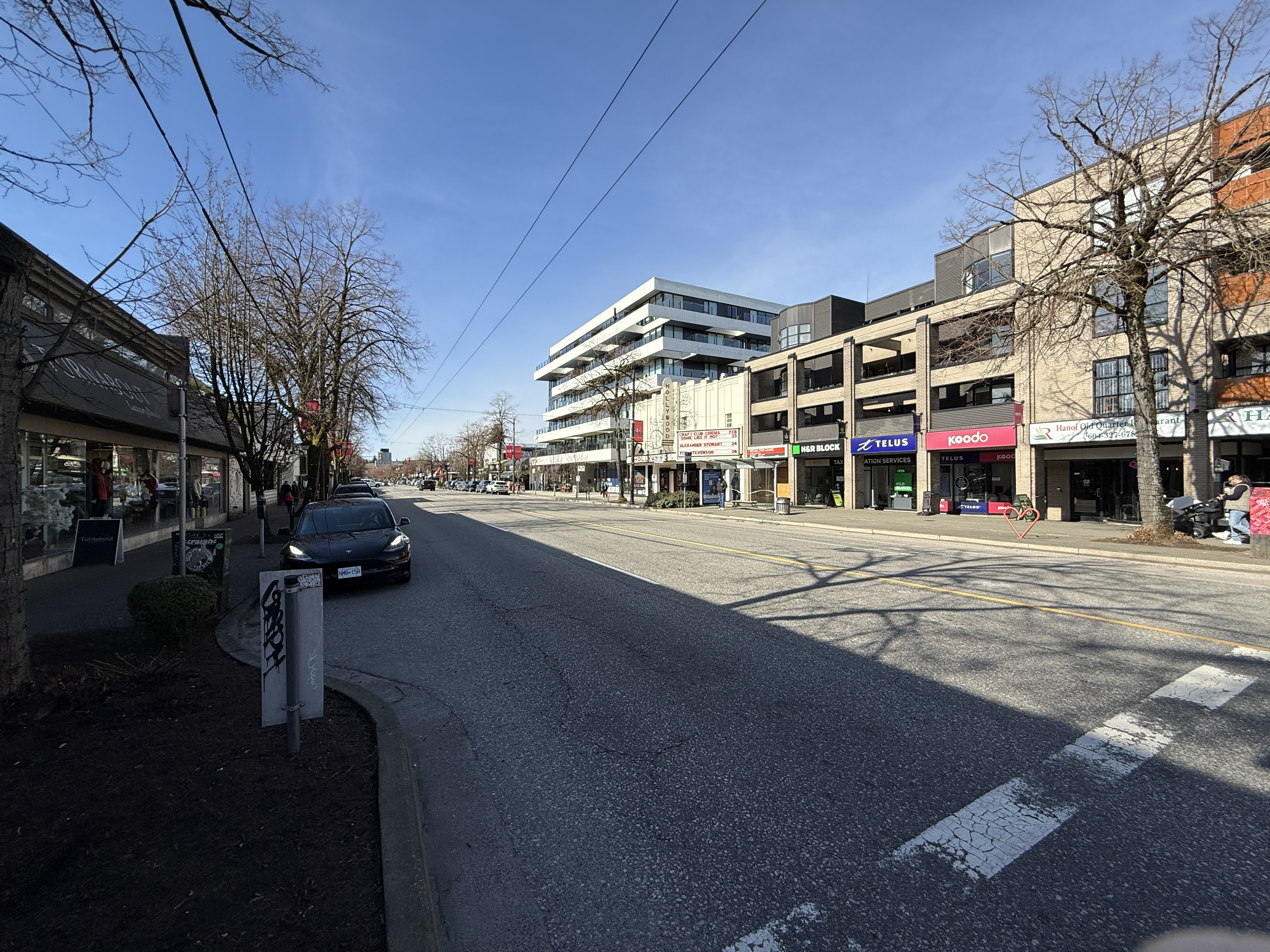
- West Broadway near Balaclava Street in 2026

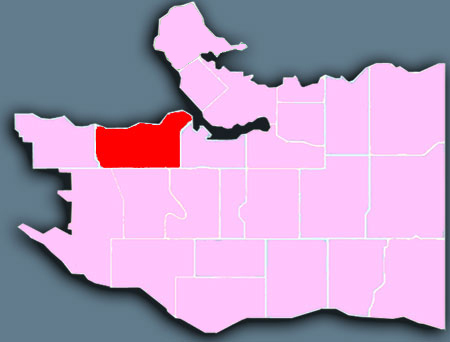
- Location of Kitsilano in Vancouver
- Country: Canada
- State: British Columbia

Greektown in Vancouver, British Columbia, Canada, is an area in the Kitsilano neighbourhood that was historically an enclave of Greek immigrants and their descendants. The term is an informal one, and Greektown's borders are not strictly defined; however, West Broadway around šxʷməθkʷəy̓əmasəm Street is generally considered the neighbourhood's heart, while Blenheim St to the west and MacDonald St to the east are approximately its outer limits. Vancouverites of Greek descent, who live in Kitsilano, nostalgically also call the area Ουέστ Μπροντουέι (literally "West Broadway").

This Greek identity has waned considerably since the area first became a community of exiles during the dictatorship in Greece of the 1960s and early 1970s, and the primary markers of Greektown are St. George's Greek Orthodox Cathedral, located at the intersection of Arbutus Street and Valley Drive, the local Athens Social Club, a Greek supermarket, and a higher-than-average concentration of Greek restaurants. There is also a Greek Senior Citizen Society.

St. George's Greek Orthodox Cathedral been noted for its traditional Byzantine icons. St. George's Hellenic Community of Vancouver (attached to the cathedral with the same patron saint), holds a Greek Food Festival from October 20 to October 22 every year.

The Hellenic Cultural Festival takes place every June in Kitsilano. The highlight is Greek Day, when Broadway is closed to vehicle traffic between MacDonald and Blenheim for free, family-oriented festivities. The festival is part of an ongoing effort to restore the Greek identity of Greektown.

== History ==
After World War II, Greek refugees from Europe and western Canada congregated in the Kitsilano area of Vancouver. They founded the aforementioned Greek Orthodox Cathedral, several businesses and social clubs, schools, a bank, newspapers, and, later, a television station.

In the 1971 Canadian census, Greek was the second-most common language and ethnicity in the Kitsilano area (most common was English and the British Isles, respectively). In 1974, the city of Vancouver sanctioned an annual Greek Day celebration in the area.

The current St. George's Greek Orthodox Cathedral was built in 1974 and its adjacent Hellenic Community Centre was built shortly thereafter in 1977.

Originally St. George's Greek Orthodox Cathedral was located at West Seventh and Vine. But between 1954 and 1960, when Vancouver saw such an influx of Greek immigrants that St. George's Hellenic community leaders realized their original church was no longer large enough to accommodate the congregation. The property, today the home of Kitsilano Neighbourhood House, was also not big enough for the construction of a larger church so a new location was proposed.

In the 2001 Canadian census, the percentage of people in Kitsilano reporting Greek as their mother tongue had shrunk to 2 percent, fewer than those speaking English, Chinese, French, or German.

In 2005, the City of Vancouver, the Government of British Columbia, and the Government of Greece sponsored a return of Greek Day that has continued annually since.
