= Little Italy, Vancouver =

Little Italy
- Area in Vancouver
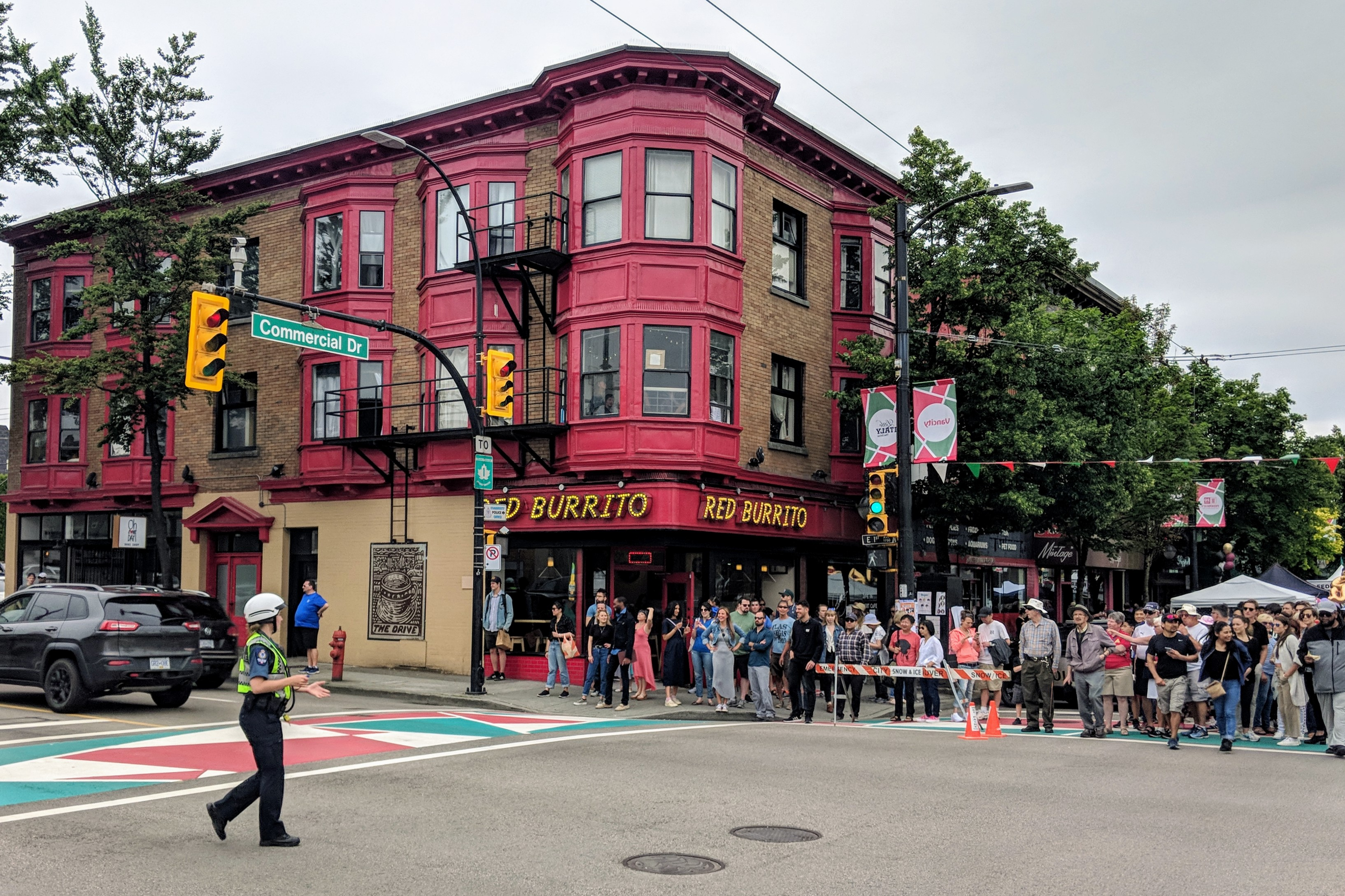
- East 1st Avenue and Commercial Drive during the "Italian Days" festival

- Location within Greater Vancouver Regional District
- Coordinates: 49°16′11″N 123°04′11″W
- Country: Canada
- Province: British Columbia
- Region: Lower Mainland
- City: Vancouver

Little Italy is an area in the eastern part of Vancouver, British Columbia, Canada. It is in the Grandview–Woodland neighbourhood, and is often synonymous with the Commercial Drive area.

Historically this area was an enclave of ethnic Italians and Italian businesses. Today, after a period of steady decline, it is again a multi-cultural, vibrant commercial centre.

== History ==
Prior to the 1930s, most Italian immigrants settled in what is today the Strathcona district; however, by the 1940s and 1950s most Italian immigrants to Vancouver settled in the northern Commercial Drive area, and were widely credited with revitalizing the neighbourhood. Most Italian Canadian businesses and cultural facilities are located along Commercial Drive and, since Italians were in the majority in the adjacent residential areas, Little Italy became a true ethnic Italian enclave. By the 1960s, many Italian businesses also sprang up in the Hastings and Nanaimo areas, but the cultural core remained on Commercial Drive. Ethnic Italians were very influential in this area from the 1940s until the mid-1970s.

By the mid-1970s, a combination of cultural assimilation, non-Italian immigration, movement to the suburbs, and a schism within the Italian community led to the decline of Italian influence and concentration in Little Italy. Today, the area is again a vibrant cultural and business centre in eastern Vancouver, but after a succession of other immigrant and cultural groups, the Italian influence has greatly diminished.

On April 6, 2016, the Vancouver City Councillors voted unanimously to declare the area Little Italy. A ribbon-cutting ceremony was held on June 12 to officially recognize an eight-block stretch of Commercial Drive as Little Italy.

== Italians in Metro Vancouver today ==
Today, there are still many Italian businesses and cultural organizations in Vancouver, and people of Italian ancestry living in the Greater Vancouver area number about 75,000. However, no particular single area is predominantly Italian in concentration.

Burnaby Heights is not predominantly Italian, but Italian-Canadians have a distinct presence in the neighbourhood. East Hastings Street, between Boundary and Duthie, is another commercial hub for the Italian community. There are many Italian cafes, delis, and restaurants along the street, including stores which import goods from Italy. Two Roman Catholic churches offering masses in Italian, St. Helen's and Holy Cross, are located nearby. Older, first-generation Italians often congregate in nearby Confederation Park to play Bocce.
