= Broadway (Vancouver) =

Thoroughfare in Vancouver, British Columbia

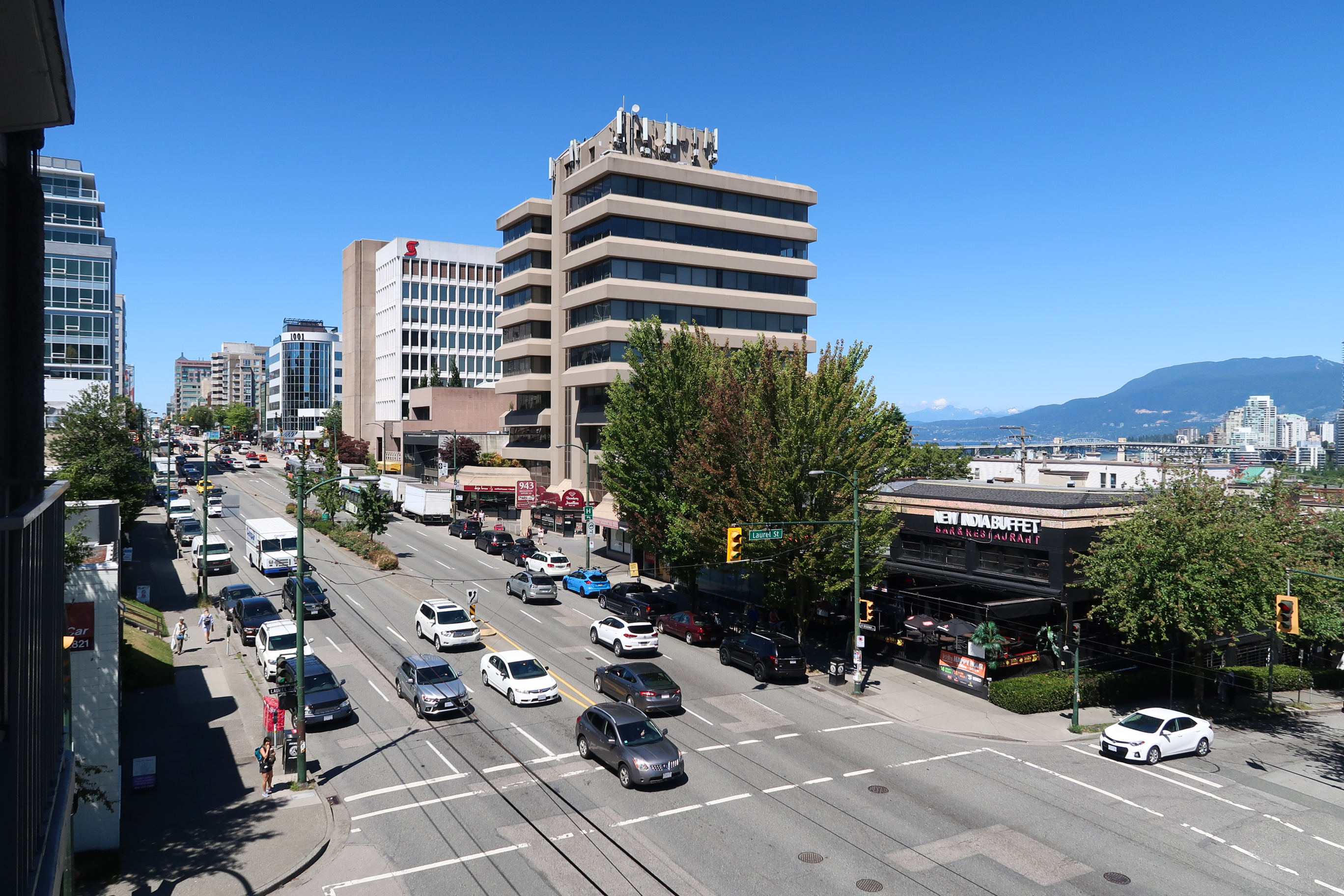
- West Broadway, seen from Park Inn & Suites by Radisson
- Part of: Highway 7
- Type: Street
- Length: 11.6 km (7.2 mi)
- Location: Vancouver, British Columbia, Canada
- Nearest metro station: Commercial–Broadway; Broadway–City Hall
- West end: Wallace Crescent
- Major junctions: Burrard Street; Granville Street (Highway 99); Oak Street; Cambie Street; Main Street; Kingsway; Clark Drive; Commercial Drive
- East end: Rupert Street

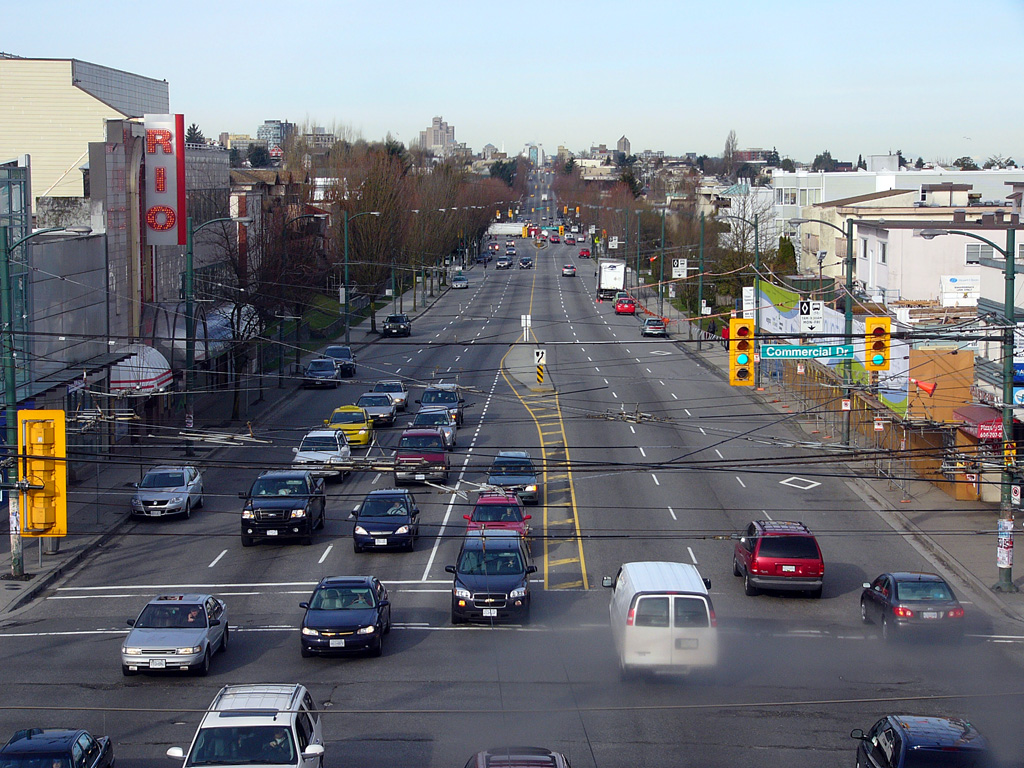
The intersection of Broadway and Commercial Drive, seen from the Broadway SkyTrain station

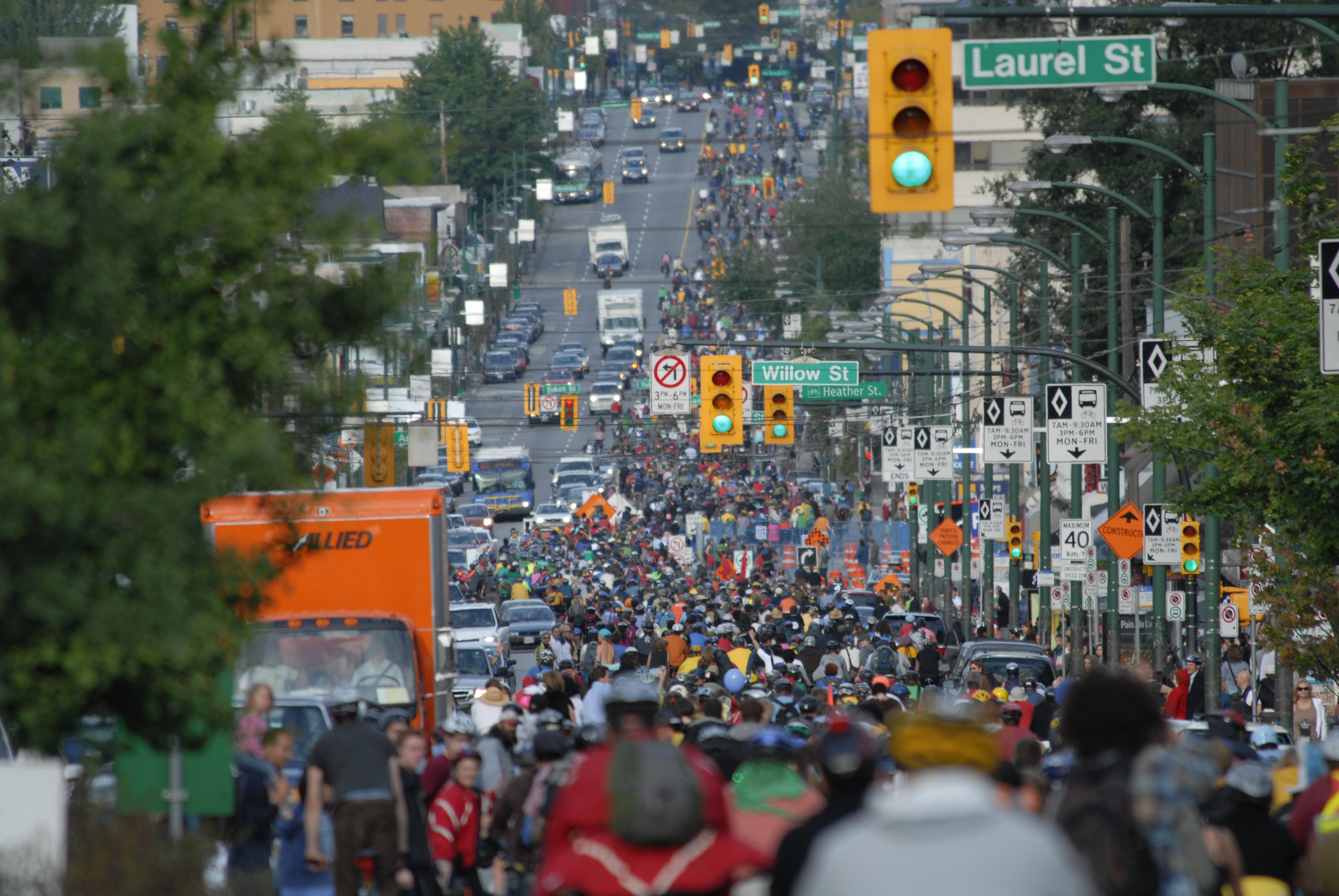
Broadway filled with bicycles during a Critical Mass in 2007

Broadway is a major east–west thoroughfare in the city of Vancouver, British Columbia, Canada. In Vancouver's numbered avenue grid system, it runs in place of a 9th Avenue, between 8th and 10th. The street has six lanes for most of its course. Portions of the street carry the British Columbia Highway 7 designation.

== Route ==
The route begins as "West Broadway" at the intersection of Wallace Crescent and 8th Avenue, in the affluent residential neighbourhood of West Point Grey, a few kilometres east of the University of British Columbia (UBC). Past Alma Street, Broadway takes over from 10th Avenue as one of Vancouver's major thoroughfares, as it enters the West Broadway (or Greektown) section of Vancouver's Kitsilano district. East of here are several blocks of upscale shops interspersed with low-rise apartment blocks and small supermarkets. The surrounding neighbourhoods generally consist of large, older homes dating from the early twentieth century, many of which have been subdivided into rental suites.

As Broadway approaches Arbutus Street, the commercial establishments become larger before transitioning into a mix of small to mid-size apartment blocks. East of Burrard Street, the apartment blocks get progressively taller, and commercial establishments larger and busier. Between Burrard and Main Street, Broadway can be considerably congested by vehicular traffic. Past Granville Street, Broadway yields completely to medium-to-large commercial structures and high-rise apartments and condominiums. Between Cambie and Main, the commercial establishments become smaller and somewhat more downscale.

At Ontario Street, two blocks west of Main, the route becomes "East Broadway." After bisecting Main and Kingsway, traffic on Broadway eases somewhat, and the character returns to a mix of small-to-medium apartment buildings and commercial establishments, interspersed with older homes – all considerably less affluent than those to the west. At Commercial Drive, Broadway passes by the Commercial–Broadway SkyTrain station. Past here for several blocks, the neighbourhood consists predominantly of older residential homes.

As Broadway travels east of Renfrew Street, the neighbourhood once again becomes mixed, with older homes to the north and larger industrial, commercial, and warehouse establishments to the south. Broadway finally ends at Cassiar Street, just short of the Vancouver–Burnaby boundary, where it becomes the Lougheed Highway.

== History and character ==
Broadway was created at the turn of the 20th century, along with other gridded roads south of False Creek, to meet the needs of an expanding population in Vancouver. The name of the route was changed from 9th Avenue to Broadway in 1909, at the behest of merchants around Main Street (at that time the hub of Vancouver commerce), who felt that it bestowed a more cosmopolitan air. Commercial establishments originally spread out around the intersections of Cambie and Main Streets, while the character of the rest of the route remained predominantly single-family dwellings.

By the 1970s, the length of Broadway had become a major arterial route in Vancouver, conveying commuters from downtown to the neighbourhoods of the west and east sides. With the growth of UBC and the expansion of the Vancouver General Hospital (one block south of Broadway between approximately Oak and Cambie), traffic demands accelerated. In the 1990s, the agency then responsible for public transit in Greater Vancouver – BC Transit – introduced an express bus route, the 99 B-Line, to help reduce congestion. The Vancouver transportation plan for Broadway notes that congestion is such that the bus service is at capacity, and will not be eased until a new rapid transit line is built paralleling the street. A 6-kilometre (3.7 mi), 6-station extension of the Millennium Line from the current terminus at VCC-Clark station down Central Broadway to Arbutus began construction in 2021, with completion expected in the fourth quarter of 2027.

== Neighbourhoods ==
Broadway passes through the following Vancouver neighbourhoods (from west to east):

- West Point Grey
- Kitsilano
- Fairview
- Mount Pleasant
- Grandview–Woodland (north) and Kensington–Cedar Cottage (south)
- Hastings-Sunrise (north) and Renfrew–Collingwood (south)

== Major intersections ==
Intersections are listed from west to east. The entire route is in Vancouver.

km	mi	Destinations	Notes
0.0	0.0	West 8th Avenue Wallace Crescent	Continues west as West 8th Avenue
0.5	0.31	Alma Street	
2.9	1.8	Arbutus Street	Arbutus station (under construction)
3.5	2.2	Burrard Street	
4.0	2.5	Granville Street (Highway 99) – City Centre, Whistler, Airport (YVR), USA Border	South Granville station (under construction); Highway 7 western terminus; west end of Hwy 7 concurrency
4.9	3.0	Oak Street	Near Oak–VGH station (under construction); alternate route to Highway 99 south
5.7	3.5	Cambie Street – City Centre	Broadway–City Hall station (Millennium Line connection under construction)
6.7	4.2	Main Street – City Centre	Mount Pleasant station (under construction)
6.8	4.2	Kingsway	Former Highway 1A / Highway 99A
8.4	5.2	Clark Drive	
9.0	5.6	Commercial Drive	Commercial–Broadway station
10.0	6.2	Nanaimo Street	
10.9	6.8	Renfrew Street	Near Renfrew station
11.6	7.2	Rupert Street Highway 7 east (Lougheed Highway) – Burnaby, Maple Ridge, Mission	Rupert station; continues as east as Lougheed Highway
1.000 mi = 1.609 km; 1.000 km = 0.621 mi: Concurrency terminus
