= Oak Street (Vancouver) =

Street in Vancouver, British Columbia, Canada

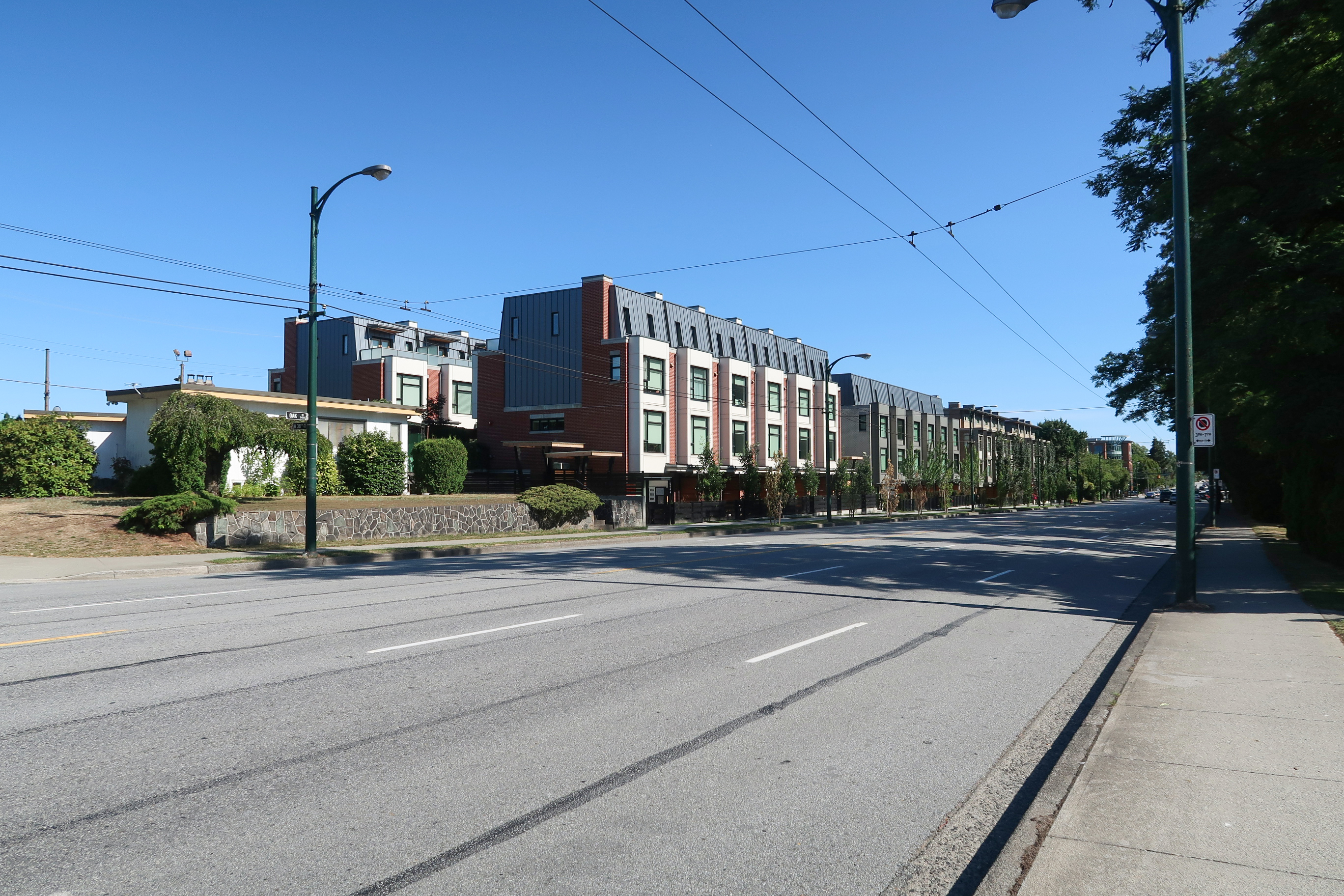
- Oak Street (2018)
- Part of: Highway 99
- Type: Street
- Length: 8.4 km (5.2 mi)
- Location: Vancouver, British Columbia
- South end: Oak Street Bridge
- Major junctions: SW Marine Drive; 70th Avenue; 41st Avenue; Broadway
- North end: 6th Avenue

Oak Street is a major north-south street in Vancouver, British Columbia, Canada. The street begins in the north at an intersection with 6th Avenue in the Fairview neighbourhood (just south of False Creek) and continues to the Oak Street Bridge in the south, leading towards Richmond. There is a small portion west of the bridge that is in the industrial area of Vancouver along the Fraser River From its intersection with 70th Avenue southwards - the route is a component section of Highway 99, except for the aforementioned industrial section.

The street is two lanes wide for the first two blocks from its northern terminus, four lanes wide in the block between 8th Avenue and Broadway, and six lanes wide for the remainder to its southern terminus at the Oak Street Bridge. From north to south, it runs through a very busy commercial district, then by Vancouver General Hospital, British Columbia's Children's Hospital, B.C. Women's Hospital & Health Centre and the VanDusen Botanical Garden. The street serves as the division between Shaughnessy on the west and South Cambie on the east, then runs through Oakridge and into Marpole, a busy middle-class commercial and residential area, and finally onto the Oak Street Bridge into Richmond, for the Highway 99 branch. The industrial branch terminates south of 77 Avenue W.

== History ==
Oak Street and other tree-themed streets in the area were named on an 1887 map by L.A. Hamilton, the Canadian Pacific Railway's land commissioner and an alderman on Vancouver's first city council. The name was officially registered in 1891, and ended at the boundary between the City of Vancouver and the Municipality of Point Grey (16th Avenue), until Point Grey extended the street name in stages between 1910-1912 to Marine Drive.

After World War I, Vancouver's Jewish community began to establish its presence in an area roughly bound by Granville Street and Cambie Street centred on Oak Street, with the city's first Jewish Community Centre opening at the intersection of Oak and 11th Avenue in 1928. Nonetheless, a large portion of Jewish residents remained in East Vancouver until after World War II, when increasing upward mobility attracted the community to the largely middle-class Oak Street corridor. The city's first synagogue, Schara Tzedeck, moved to its current location at Oak and 19th in 1947-48.

Jewish settlement continued to intensify along the Oak Street corridor in the 1960s and 1970s, although beginning to shift southwards and westwards into the Oakridge neighbourhood by that time, with the opening of a new Jewish Community Centre at the intersection of Oak and 41st Avenue in 1962. Along with the establishment of various congregations and institutions, the corridor increasingly became the focal point of the city's Jewish community. With rising property values along the corridor in the late 20th and early 21st centuries, the Jewish community had become dispersed around Greater Vancouver in search of less expensive housing. At the same time, the corridor became increasingly popular among the Chinese community, with about 20% of residents along Oak Street identifying as Chinese by 1971.

== Major intersections ==
The entire route is in Vancouver.

km	mi	Destinations	Notes
0.0– 1.8	0.0– 1.1	Highway 99 south – Richmond, Tsawwassen ferry terminal, Canada–United States border	Continues south; south end of Highway 99 concurrency
0.0– 1.8	0.0– 1.1	Oak Street Bridge crosses the North Arm Fraser River	
1.8	1.1	Southwest Marine Drive	Interchange; northbound signed as exit 41A (east) and 41B (west); no southbound exit number; alternate routing for Highway 99 north
2.0	1.2	West 70th Avenue (Highway 99 north)	Highway 99 officially follows 70th Avenue; left turns prohibited; Highway 99 is cosigned on Oak Street
3.2	2.0	West 57th Avenue	
4.0	2.5	West 49th Avenue	
4.8	3.0	West 41st Avenue to Highway 99 north – City Centre, Horseshoe Bay ferry terminal, Whistler	
5.3	3.3	West 37th Avenue	Access to VanDusen Botanical Garden
5.7	3.5	West 33rd Avenue	Access to Queen Elizabeth Park
6.0	3.7	BC Children's Hospital	
6.5	4.0	King Edward Avenue	
7.8	4.8	West 12th Avenue	
8.0	5.0	West 10th Avenue	Access to Vancouver General Hospital
8.1	5.0	West Broadway (Highway 7) to Highway 99 north – City Centre, Horseshoe Bay ferry terminal, Whistler	
8.4	5.2	West 6th Avenue	
1.000 mi = 1.609 km; 1.000 km = 0.621 mi: Concurrency terminus
