= Burrard Street =

Major thoroughfare in Vancouver, British Columbia, Canada

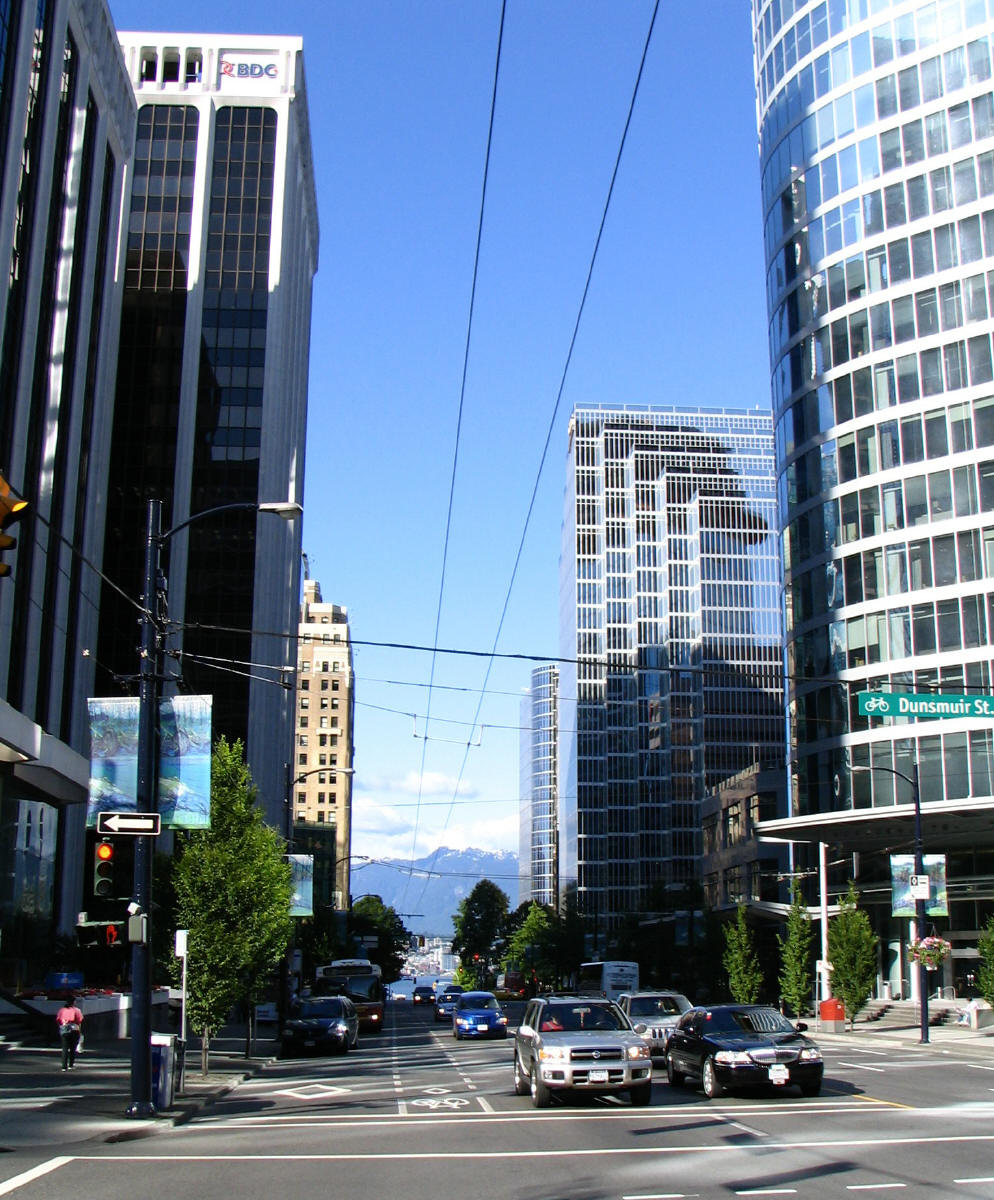
- Burrard Street in the Financial District, with a vista of the North Shore Mountains.
- Namesake: Burrard Inlet, Sir Harry Burrard-Neale
- Type: Street
- Length: 4.6 km (2.9 mi)
- Location: Financial District, central
- Nearest metro station: Burrard Station
- North end: Canada Place
- Major junctions: Hastings Street; Georgia Street; Robson Street; Broadway
- South end: West 17th Avenue

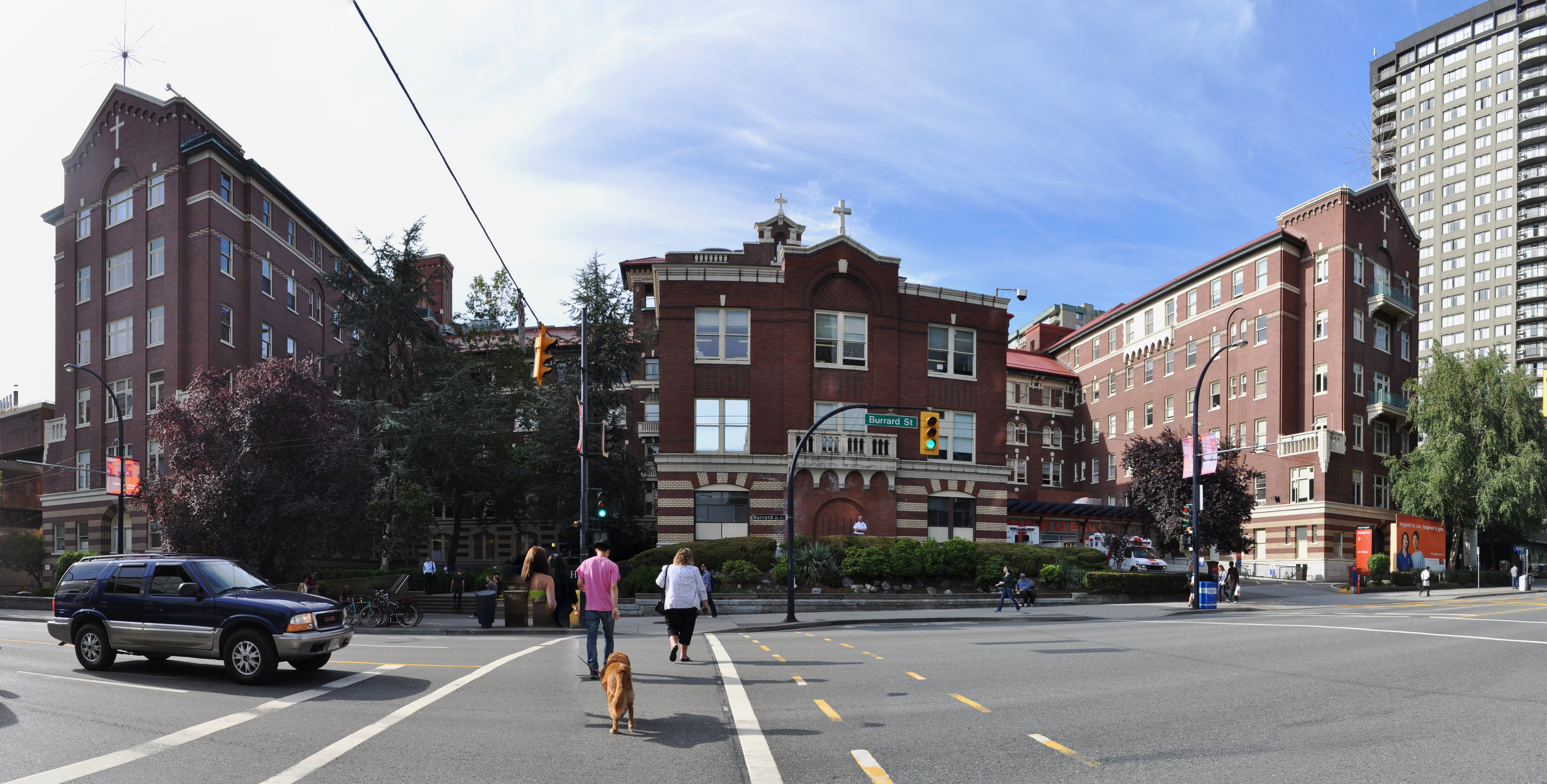
Burrard Street entrance to St. Paul's Hospital

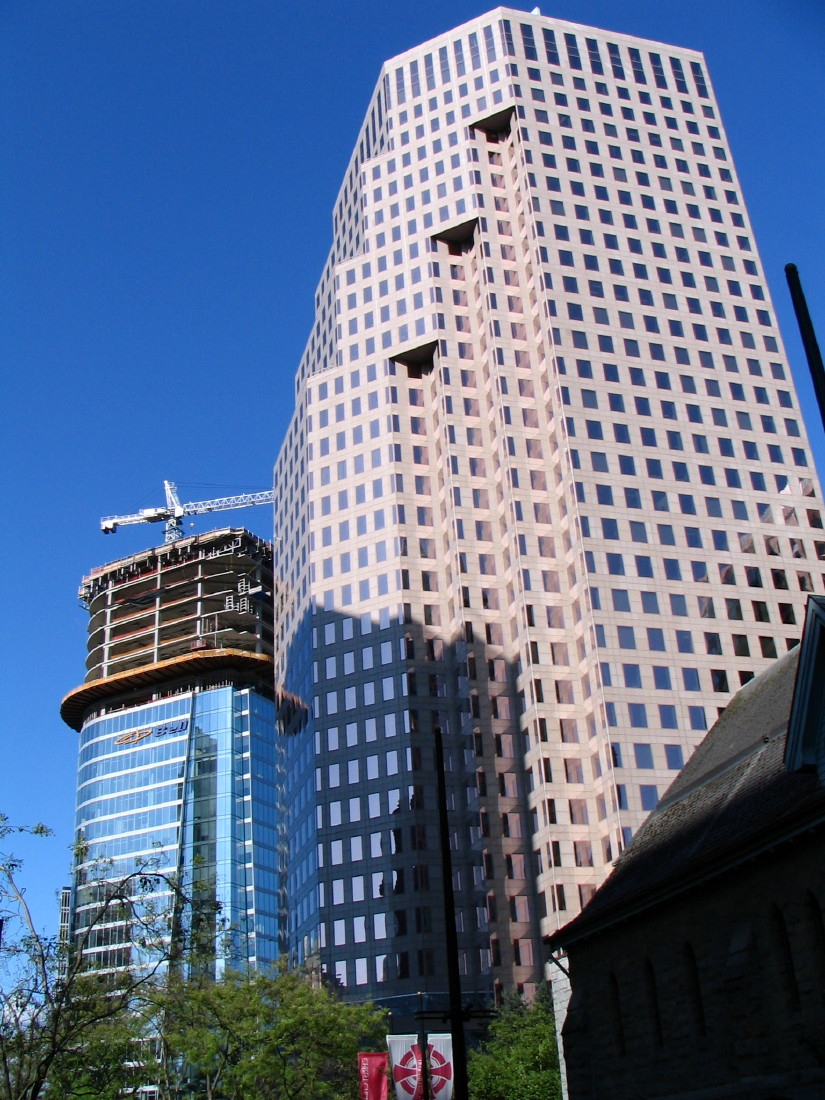
Vancouver Financial District, with '666 Burrard Street' landmark skyscraper (foreground) and the Bentall 5 tower (left), circa 2006.

Burrard Street is a major thoroughfare in Vancouver, British Columbia, Canada. It is the central street of Downtown Vancouver and the Financial District. The street is named for Burrard Inlet, located at its northern terminus, which in turn is named for Sir Harry Burrard-Neale.

The street starts at Canada Place near the Burrard Inlet, then runs southwest through downtown Vancouver. It crosses False Creek via the Burrard Bridge. South of False Creek, on what used to be called Cedar Street before the completion of the bridge in 1932, the street runs due south until the intersection with West 16th Avenue.

The intersection of Burrard Street and Georgia Street is considered to be the centrepoint of Downtown Vancouver, along with the more tourist-oriented and upscale shopping-spirited intersection of Burrard Street and Robson Street to the south. At and due northeast of the centre is the heart of the Financial District. Further down closer to Vancouver Harbour stands the historic Marine Building, an Art Deco masterpiece, opened in 1930, two years before the Art Deco pylons of the Burrard Bridge at the opposite end of the street. Finally at the Harbour lies Canada Place and the Vancouver Convention Centre.

Nearer to Burrard Bridge is located St. Paul's Hospital, established on Burrard Street in 1894.

Burrard Street served as the dividing line between the two district lots laid out on the downtown peninsula in the second half of the 19th century: District Lot 185 (now West End) and District Lot 541 (granted to the Canadian Pacific Railway). The two grids were oriented differently, with the result that only every third northwest-southeast street in DL185 actually continuing southeast beyond Burrard into DL541. Burrard currently serves as the boundary between West End and Downtown, as defined by the City of Vancouver.

Burrard Street is served by SkyTrain's Burrard Station, located underground between the intersections with Melville and Dunsmuir Streets in the heart of the Financial District. Along the downtown portion, there is a bike lane on the southwest-bound direction towards the Burrard Bridge.

== Major intersections ==
The entire route is in Vancouver.

km	mi	Destinations	Notes
0.0	0.0	Canada Place	
0.1	0.062	Cordova Street	
0.2	0.12	Hastings Street	
0.3	0.19	Pender Street	
0.4	0.25	Dunsmuir Street	
0.6	0.37	Highway 99 (Georgia Street)	
0.8	0.50	Robson Street	
0.9	0.56	Smithe Street	One-way, northwest-bound (east of Burrard Street)
1.1	0.68	Nelson Street	One-way, southeast-bound; connects to Cambie Street Bridge and Cambie Street
1.4	0.87	Davie Street	
1.7	1.1	Pacific Street	
1.8– 2.7	1.1– 1.7	Burrard Street Bridge crosses False Creek	
2.8	1.7	Cornwall Avenue	
3.3	2.1	West 4th Avenue	
3.8	2.4	Broadway	
4.5	2.8	West 16th Avenue	
4.6	2.9	Cedar Crescent / West 17th Avenue	
1.000 mi = 1.609 km; 1.000 km = 0.621 mi
