= Grandview–Woodland =

- Neighbourhood
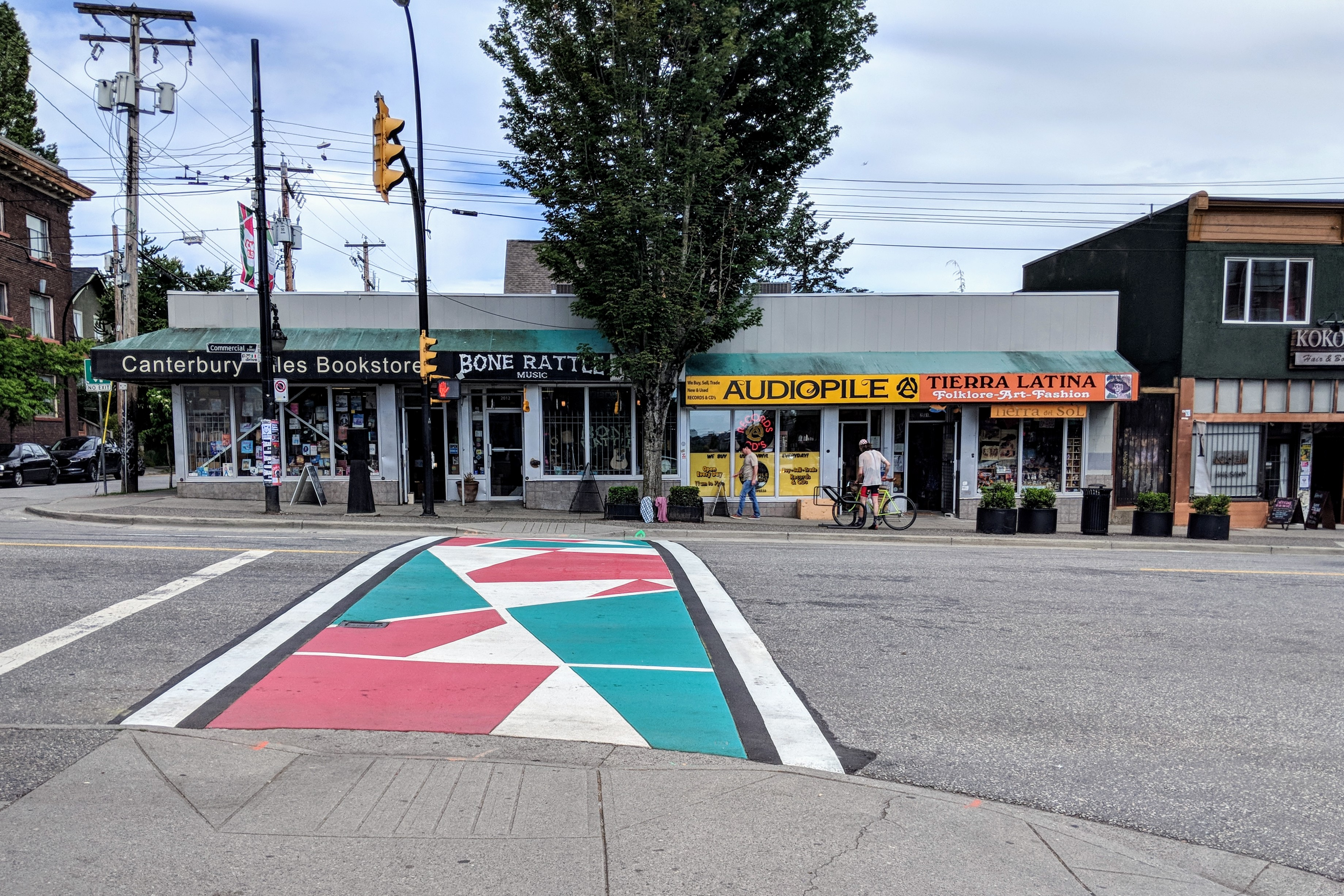
- Commercial Drive in Grandview–Woodland

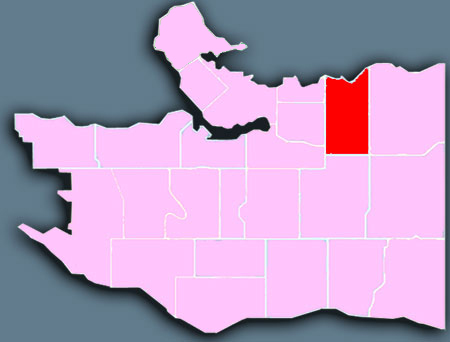
- Location of Grandview–Woodland in Vancouver
- Coordinates: 49.275°N 123.067°W
- Country: Canada
- Province: British Columbia
- Region: Lower Mainland
- Regional district: Metro Vancouver
- Municipality: Vancouver

Area
  - Total: 4.45 km^{2} (1.72 sq mi)

Population (2016)
  - Total: 29,175
  - Density: 6,556.1/km^{2} (16,980/sq mi)

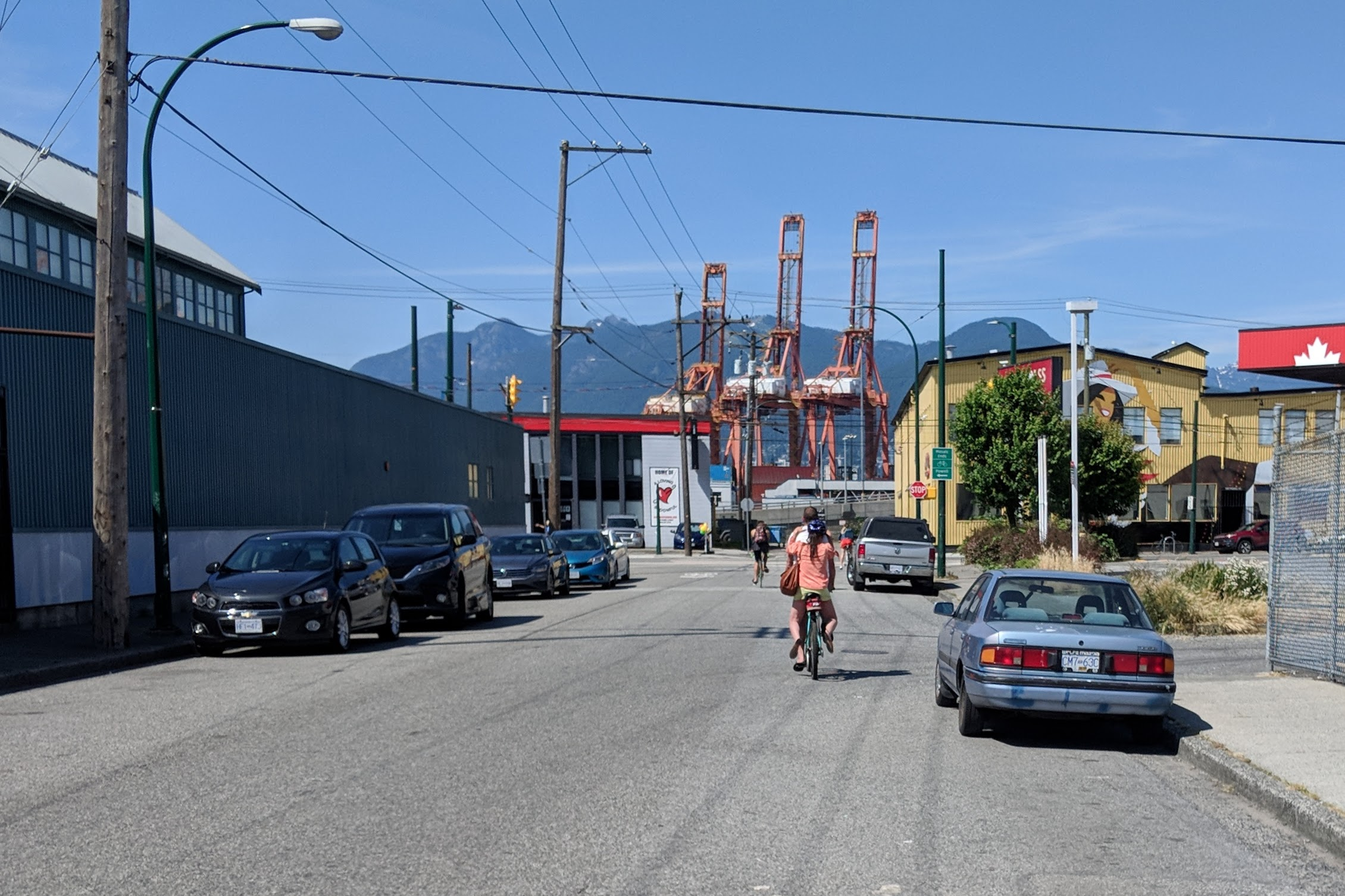
The Port of Vancouver is located at the northern end of the neighbourhood.

Grandview–Woodland, also commonly known as Grandview–Woodlands, is a neighbourhood in Vancouver, British Columbia, Canada to the east of the downtown area, stretching south from the shores of Burrard Inlet and encompassing portions of the popular Commercial Drive area. It is a mature neighbourhood in Vancouver that is a vibrant mixture of commercial, industrial, single-family and multi-family residential with a rich ethnic history and features.

A central part of the Vancouver area, Grandview–Woodland runs from the south shore of busy Burrard Inlet south to Broadway, one of the city's major east–west roads. The western border of the neighbourhood is Clark Drive, the eastern Nanaimo Street. It is a busy area for transportation, with Hastings Street and First Avenue both cutting through the neighbourhood, while Victoria Drive and Commercial Drive both run north–south through the area.

Much of the neighbourhood is built on the rise that stretches east–west through the eastern portion of Vancouver, making for views across the city proper and the inlet.

== History ==
Local First Nations members have been aware of the Grandview–Woodland area for many years, and referred to the area along Burrard Inlet by the word for cedar trees in their language. A small cove created by a stream running into the inlet became a focal point for early development; the first building was a brewery, followed by sawmills using the forests of the area. The land along Burrard Inlet was valued by speculators after the Gold Rush, and was the location of the Canadian Pacific Railway when it was built in the 1880s. Around that time, the sawmill owners clearcut the entire Grandview–Woodland area, and the construction of the Interurban train line to New Westminster, British Columbia in 1891 spurred the construction of a new community in the area. One legend indicates that the name Grand View was first expressed on a sign hung by a homeowner next to the Interurban stop near the Commercial Drive-1st Avenue intersection.

In 1906, construction started to boom, with homes being built through the neighbourhood, and the railway influencing industrial development along the waterfront. Commercial Drive was originally called Park Drive. It changed to the current name in 1911 due to it becoming a bigger commercial route. According to the book A Pictoral History: Commercial Drive 1912-1954, there was some local opposition to the name change in city council record. People of many ethnic backgrounds made the neighbourhood their home over the years.

Grandview Woodland has been experiencing gentrification since around 2008 as a result of high real estate prices in Vancouver and the heightened popularity of inner-city living.

== Attractions ==
Commercial Drive is perhaps the single most popular part of Grandview–Woodland. A street packed with small shops, it has been a key part of the commercial landscape in Vancouver for nearly a century for its ethnic diversity and the uniqueness of shops that populate it. Known locally as "The Drive", visitors find everything from trendy coffee shops to hangouts for many ethnicities (celebrations during the FIFA World Cup can bring out soccer fans of many nationalities, for example) to sex toys to hemp shops. Little Italy focuses on the Drive, though many of its residents have moved to other neighbourhoods over the years.

== Demographics ==
As of 2006, Grandview–Woodland has 28,205 people, a 3% decrease from 2001. 16.1% of the population is under the age of 19; 38.4% is between 20 and 39; 35.1% is between 40 and 64; and 10.4% is 65 or older. 62.0% of Grandview–Woodland residents speak English as a first language, and 14.4% speak a Chinese language. French (2.3%), Spanish (2.3%), Italian (2.3%), and Tagalog (2.1%) are also common first languages. The median household income is $35,342, and 35.2% of its population lives in low-income households. Its unemployment rate is 7.8%.

Panethnic groups in the Grandview–Woodland neighbourhood (2001−2016)
Panethnic group	2016		2006		2001	
Panethnic group	Pop.	%	Pop.	%	Pop.	%
European (Note: Statistic includes all persons that did not make up part of a visible minority or an indigenous identity.)	18,610	64.16%	16,145	57.77%	16,195	55.89%
East Asian (Note: Statistic includes total responses of "Chinese", "Korean", and "Japanese" under visible minority section on census.)	4,460	15.38%	5,505	19.7%	5,960	20.57%
Indigenous	2,265	7.81%	2,570	9.2%	2,610	9.01%
Southeast Asian (Note: Statistic includes total responses of "Filipino" and "Southeast Asian" under visible minority section on census.)	1,545	5.33%	1,745	6.24%	2,340	8.08%
South Asian	545	1.88%	380	1.36%	535	1.85%
African	505	1.74%	530	1.9%	445	1.54%
Latin American	455	1.57%	550	1.97%	485	1.67%
Middle Eastern (Note: Statistic includes total responses of "West Asian" and "Arab" under visible minority section on census.)	220	0.76%	230	0.82%	165	0.57%
Other/Multiracial (Note: Statistic includes total responses of "Visible minority, n.i.e." and "Multiple visible minorities" under visible minority section on census.)	395	1.36%	300	1.07%	230	0.79%
Total responses	29,005	99.42%	27,945	99.08%	28,975	99.62%
Total population	29,175	100%	28,205	100%	29,085	100%
Note: Totals greater than 100% due to multiple origin responses
