= Commercial Drive =

Roadway in Vancouver, British Columbia, Canada

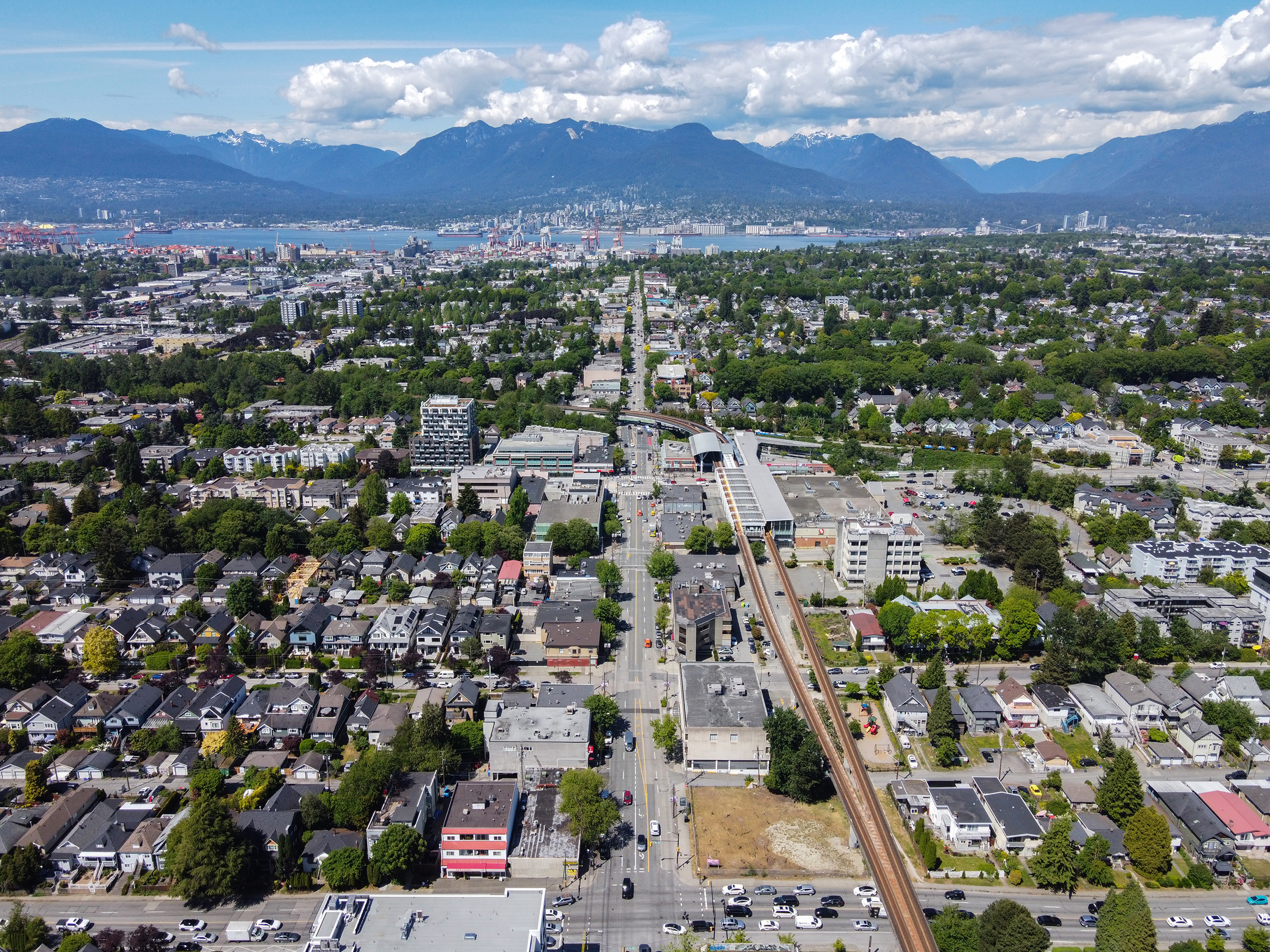
- Aerial view of Commercial Drive near Commercial-Broadway station (2026)
- Type: Street
- Length: 3.4 km (2.1 mi)
- Location: Vancouver, British Columbia
- South end: Victoria Diversion
- Major junctions: Broadway; Hastings Street
- North end: Powell Street

Other
- Website: thedrive.ca

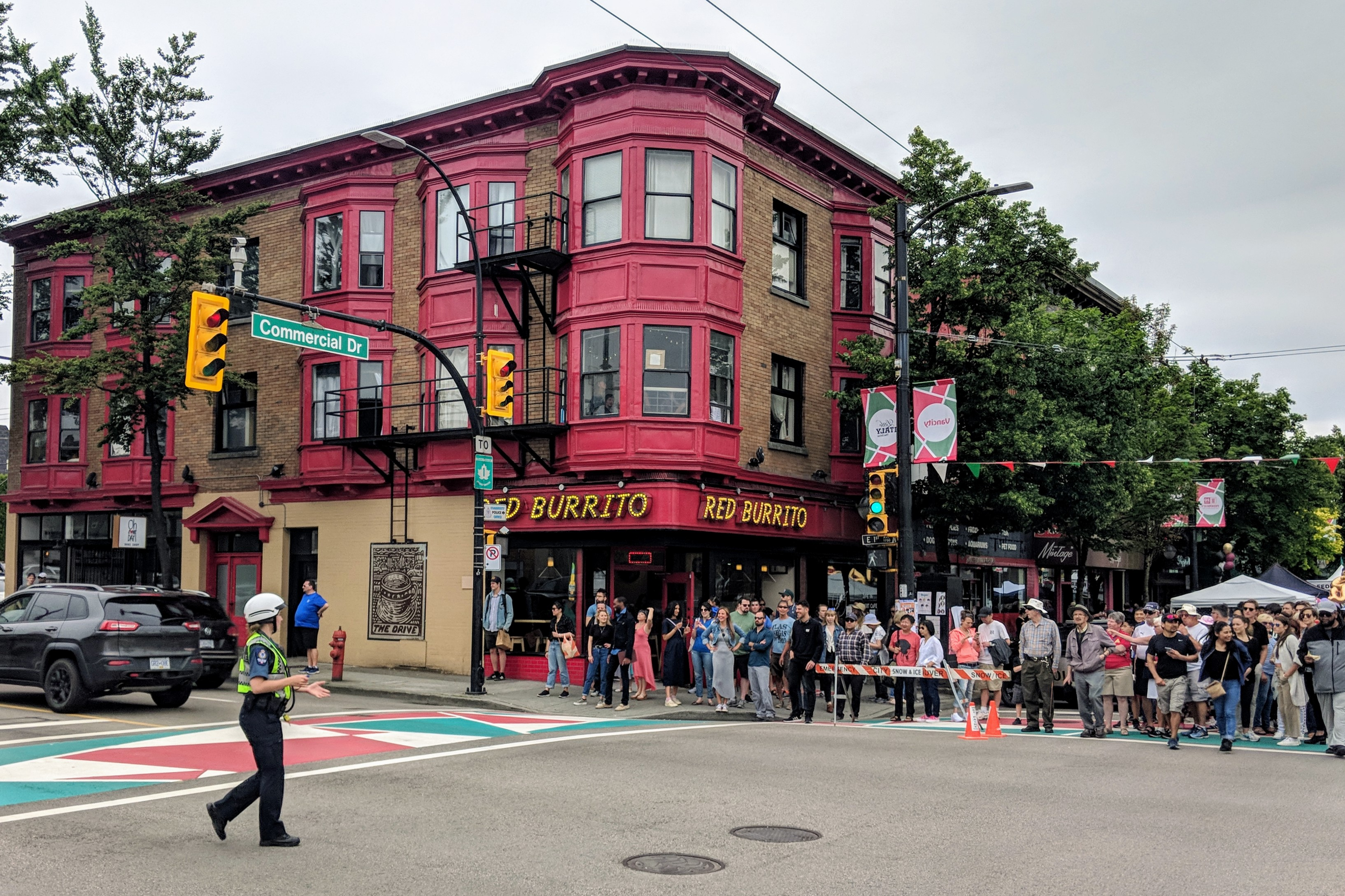
East 1st Avenue & Commercial Drive during the Italian Day festival (June 2019).

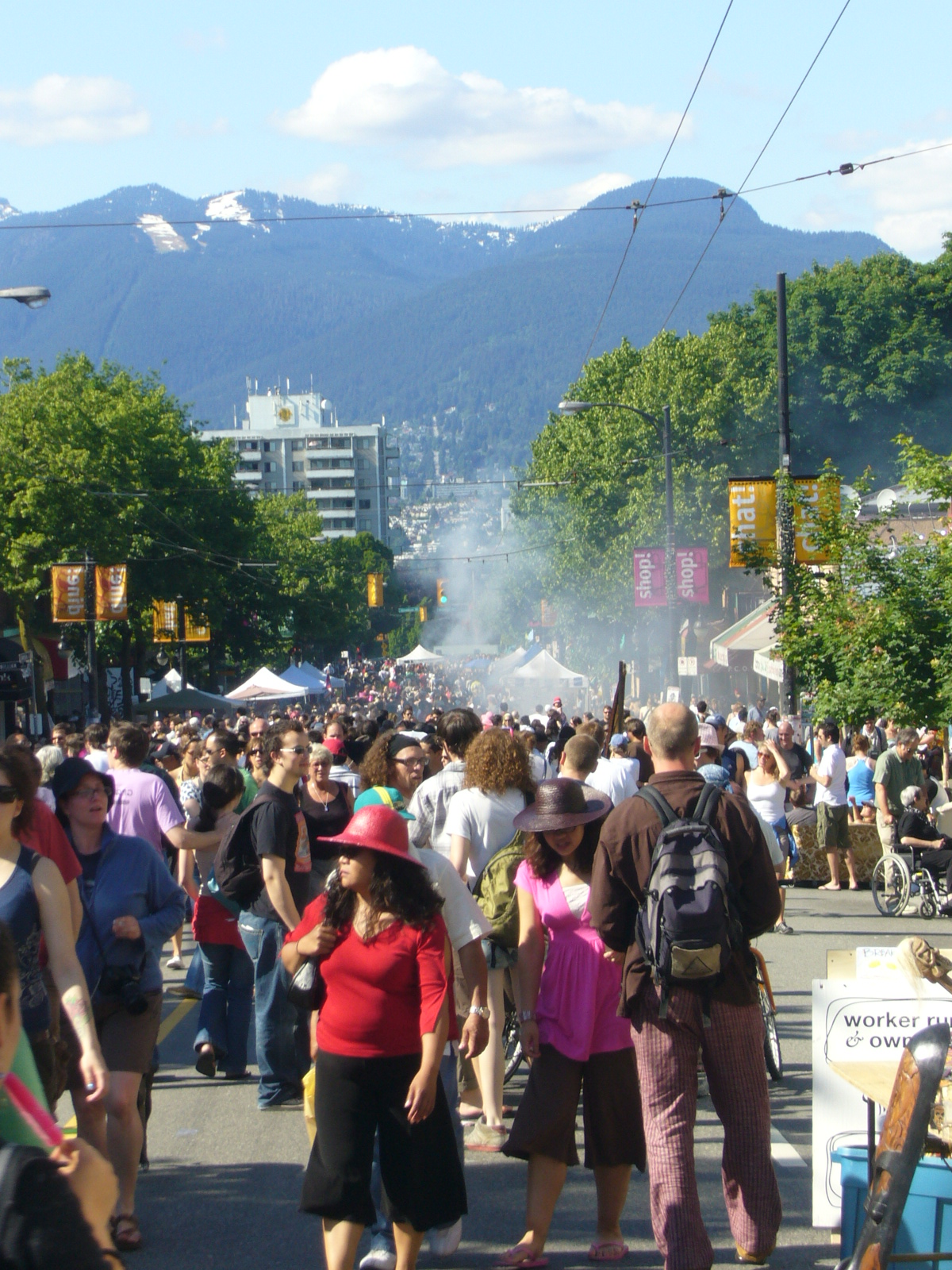
Car-Free Day Festival on The Drive, June 2008.

Commercial Drive is a roadway in the city of Vancouver in British Columbia, Canada, that extends from Powell Street at its northern extremity, near the waterfront, south through the heart of the Grandview–Woodland neighbourhood, and terminating at the Victoria Diversion near Trout Lake. The neighbourhood is so dominated by the businesses, cultural facilities, and residents along Commercial Drive that the area is far better known as "The Drive" than by the civic boundaries. The district is one of Vancouver's Business Improvement Areas (BIA).

The district is served by many different bus routes, as well as both the SkyTrain's Expo Line and Millennium Line at Commercial–Broadway Station.

Commercial Drive is a mixed residential-commercial area with a high proportion of ethnic and vegetarian restaurants, businesses, and public housing. The area has low property prices compared to the West Side of Vancouver, yet has good city services and is a local transit hub. It has been the destination for generations of immigrants to Vancouver and has significant Italian, East Asian, Latin American, Indian, and African communities. As of the Canada 2001 Census, English is a minority language in Grandview-Woodland, though still the most common.

Commercial Drive has many local ethnic stores and community groups, Edwardian-style heritage buildings, European-style cafes, bars, and alternative shops and entertainment venues. As of late 2026, there are 100-110 restaurants on Commercial Drive between Venables and Broadway at any given time, of which 22-25 are coffee bars. There is a high turnover rate of food and drink establishments on Commercial Drive, meaning there are no stable counts.

The Drive is home to an active street festival culture; notable annual events include the Vancouver Dyke March in August and the Parade of Lost Souls in October.

== History ==
=== Early History ===
Along with the rest of the Burrard Peninsula, Commercial Drive was the traditional territory of the Indigenous Squamish, Musqueam, and Tsleil-Waututh peoples. After the founding of Granville, later to be called Vancouver, Commercial Drive was originally a skid road for dragging logs to the harbour. It was first called 'Park Drive' but renamed to 'Commercial Drive' in 1911, possibly to avoid confusion with other Park Drives in Vancouver.

During the pre-World War I period, a number of speculators including George McSpadden and Edward Odlum (both of whom have nearby streets named for them) attempted to turn the neighbourhood around the Drive into a real estate development comparable to the West End and the newly-opened Shaughnessy Heights. The global financial collapse around 1913 put an end to their hopes.

=== 20th Century ===
After World War II, many Italian immigrants settled in eastern Vancouver, and the northern part of Commercial Drive came to be known as "Little Italy". A sizable Portuguese community came to the area as well. During the 1960s, immigration from Asian countries began to dilute the European influence. A wave of Latino immigrants came in the 1980s as a result of the turmoil and civil wars in Central America. Many came from the Mercosur Republics of South America as well. Vietnamese nationals also immigrated here.

Throughout the 1980s, The Drive attracted a large counter-culture demographic, including political activists and punks. Around the turn of the millennium, local outlets of multi-national companies became the target of the anti-globalization movement and civil disobedience campaigns. SkyTrain opened into the neighbourhood with Broadway Station in December 1985. Increasing real estate prices near the downtown (e.g. Downtown Eastside) pushed many lower-income residents east toward Commercial Drive. Meanwhile, gentrification began to occur in the vicinity of the Drive, increasing housing prices, and driving housing development and new storefronts replacing old wood-frame stores.

=== 21st Century ===
In 2002, many restaurant owners were upset with the infamous "dancing police"; bylaw enforcement officers who ticketed establishments hosting any dancing to live music. In late 2004, Commercial Drive gained national notoriety when the media complained that several cafes there were openly selling marijuana. As of 2005, there are still very few large retail or restaurant chains on Commercial Drive. The Da Kine, an Amsterdam-style cafe, was raided by police and owner Carol Gwilt charged with trafficking. She was eventually sentenced to prison. The issue publicized Vancouver’s of enforcement of Canadian drug laws, and demonstrated a need for commitment to the city’s stated "Four Pillars" drug strategy.

In early summer 2005, Commercial Drive hosted its first car-free festival, in which 16 blocks were cleared of all vehicles and tens of thousands of people celebrated with walks, dancing, and food. The festival has since become an annual event, expanding to other parts of the city in 2008.

In 2025, the Vancouver City council approved rezoning the Safeway near the Commercial–Broadway Skytrain Station to allow for the construction of three high-rise towers. The rezoning was prefaced by extensive public consultation and there was significant local community opposition on the Drive to what were dubbed 'megatowers' by the campaign against the rezoning.

== Events ==
=== Car Free Day Festival ===
Commercial Drive held the first Car Free Day celebration in early summer 2005. Beginning in 2008, Car Free Days expanded to the West End, Main Street, Kitsilano, and North Vancouver. These celebrations aim to showcase the diversity and culture of local neighbourhoods, and increase foot traffic and sustainability within the city.

On Commercial Drive, Car Free day is held in early July, where the City blocks off Commercial Drive from Venables Street to Grandview Highway. The festival showcases local artisans, musicians, and activities. Local businesses are invited to move their production outside to the sidewalk and street for the day, creating outdoor spaces for eating and shopping. Since the festival's beginnings, it has become increasingly popular every year, bringing in more foot traffic as well as increasing numbers of local vendors and artisans.

=== Italian Days ===
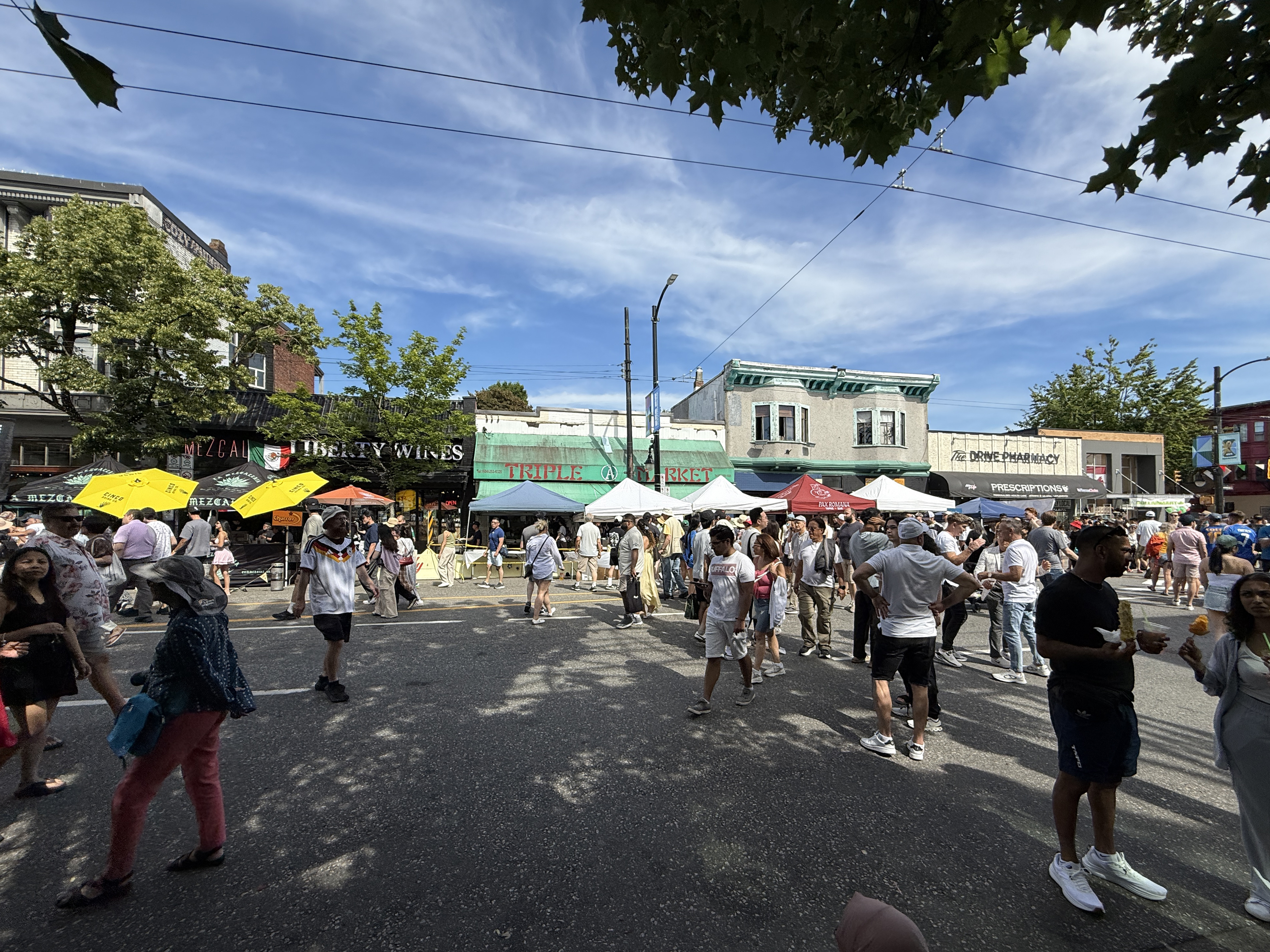
Italian Day in 2026

Italian day is a day of celebration of Commercial Drive's Italian roots and the Italian influences that have fostered the neighbourhood's growth over the years. Beginning in the early 1940s, when large numbers of Italians immigrated to the area, street festivals were often held by the community for general celebrations of Italian culture. The last festival before the modern revitalization of the celebration was held in 1982 when Italy won the World Cup for the first time since 1938.

The festival was rejuvenated in 2010 and has run every year since, bringing in businesses and foot-traffic. Italian Day is the largest one-day cultural festival in Vancouver, bringing in an increasing attendance every year. The festival continues to celebrate Commercial Drive's Italian roots today, and does so by engaging local vendors, merchants, restaurant patios, stages with live music and theatre, street performances, activities and displays.

== Major intersections ==
The entire route is in Vancouver.

km	mi	Destinations	Notes
−1.1	−0.68	Victoria Drive	Roadway continues south as Victoria Drive
−1.1	−0.68	Kingsway	Former Highway 1A / Highway 99A
−0.2	−0.12	Victoria Drive	Victoria Drive branches north; becomes Victoria Diversion
0.0	0.0	E 18th Avenue, Findlay Street	Becomes Commercial Drive
0.6	0.37	E 12th Avenue (to South Grandview Highway)	
0.9	0.56	E Broadway (Highway 7)	Commercial–Broadway station
1.7	1.1	E 1st Avenue	
3.0	1.9	E Hastings Street	Former Highway 7A
3.3	2.1	Powell Street	
3.4	2.1	dead end	
1.000 mi = 1.609 km; 1.000 km = 0.621 mi: Route transition
