= McGill Street (Vancouver) =

Street in Vancouver, Canada

McGill Street is an east-west street in Vancouver, British Columbia, Canada. It has a mix of uses, including several condominium buildings.

It includes an overpass over Canadian Pacific Railway tracks commissioned by the Port of Vancouver.

The Vancouver Sun notes that a display of katsura trees (Cercidiphyllum japonicum) on McGill Street "never fails to impress".
