= Hogan's Alley, Vancouver =

Alley in Vancouver, British Columbia

Coordinates: 49.2772°N 123.0973°W

Hogan's Alley was the local, unofficial name for Park Lane, an alley that ran through the southwestern corner of Strathcona in Vancouver, British Columbia, Canada. The alley was located between Union and Prior (north–south) and ran from approximately Main Street to Jackson Avenue (west–east). The area was ethnically diverse, populated by Black, Italian, Chinese, Japanese, Jewish, and Indigenous residents during the first six decades of the twentieth century.

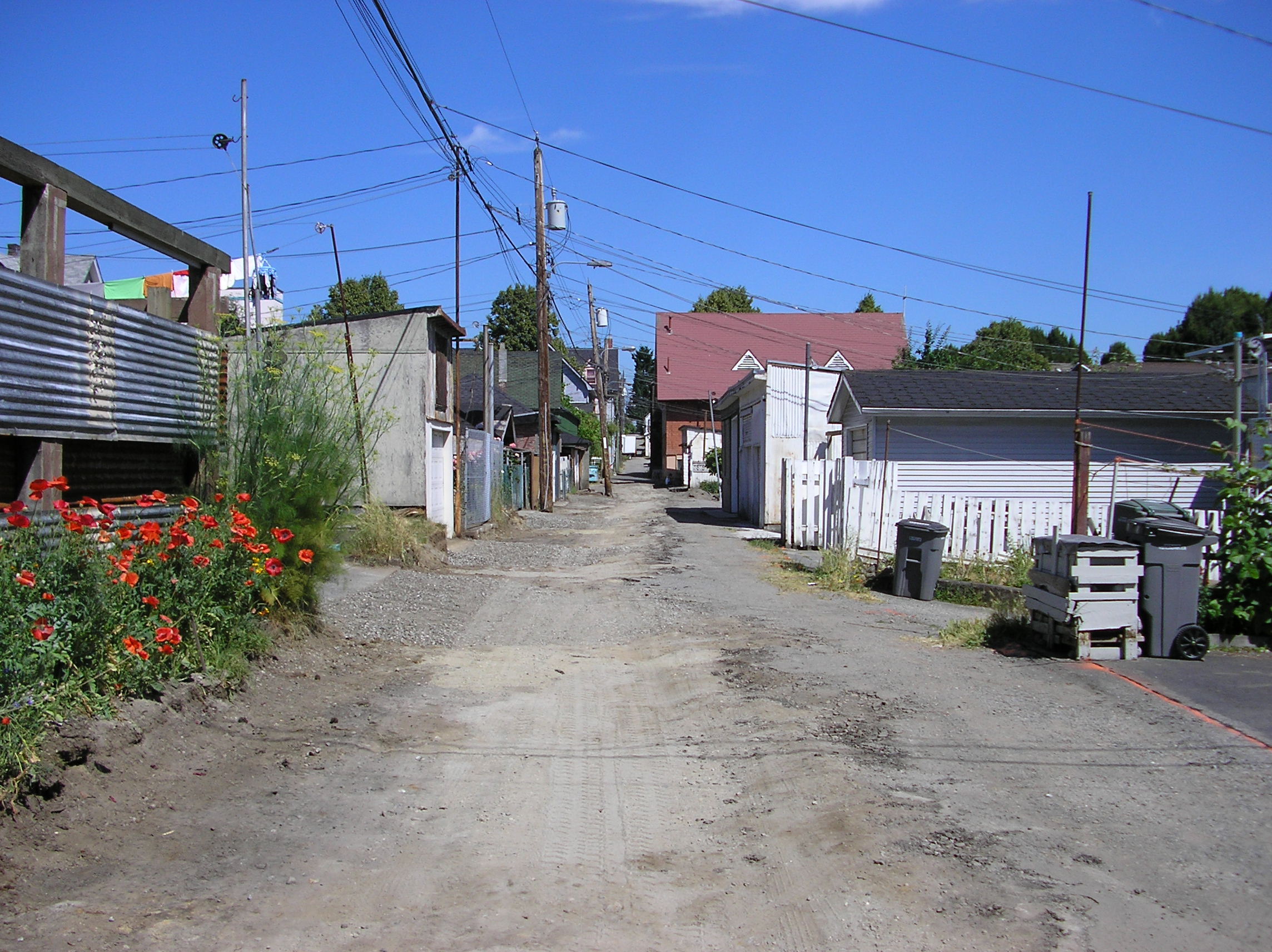
Hogan's Alley, 2006

Home to a number of Black families, Black businesses, and the city's only Black church (the African Methodist Episcopal Fountain Chapel), Hogan's Alley has been referred to as the "first and last neighbourhood in Vancouver with a substantial concentrated black population". Hogan's Alley had a vibrant night life, with eateries and nightclubs that hosted local residents, railway porters, and touring musicians alike.

Most of Hogan's Alley was destroyed circa 1970 by the Non-Partisan Association civic government's construction of the Georgia Viaduct, the first phase of the planned interurban freeway, “Project 200” originally set to run through Hogan's Alley and much of Chinatown and Gastown. The subsequent freeway construction was stopped by the Strathcona Property Owners and Tenants Association, and Strathcona, Chinatown and Gastown were spared from razing, but not before Hogan's Alley was mostly demolished and the viaducts were built. The area where Hogan's Alley once was currently bears little mark of the Black community's historical presence.

Since its destruction, Hogan's Alley has been referenced in several community-based cultural works and city projects. Groups such as Hogan's Alley Memorial Project, the Hogan's Alley Working Group, and the Hogan's Alley Society have worked to memorialize the area and advocate for Vancouver's Black community. In 2015, the City of Vancouver announced its plans to remove the viaducts and establish a cultural centre in the Hogan's Alley area.

== History ==
In 1858, a large number of Black Californians travelled to Vancouver Island, leaving behind the increasingly hostile racial climate of San Francisco. Their emigration was partially prompted by sailor Jeremiah Nagle, who came from Vancouver Island to a meeting at San Francisco's Zion Church with news of gold and a letter from James Douglas inviting the Black community to British Columbia. Following the 1858 Rush, several of the Black migrants needed a place to live with the little money they had and moved to Salt Spring Island. Many of Victoria's and Salt Spring's Black residents began to relocate to Vancouver around the start of the twentieth century because of the city's promising economic landscape.

At the same time, Vancouver's Black population was growing as Black Albertans (initially from Oklahoma) came to Strathcona and other areas around Vancouver. Many Black railroad porters, members of the Brotherhood of Sleeping Car Porters, also settled in Strathcona's Black community due to its proximity to the nearby Great Northern Railway, whose route ended in Vancouver.

It was likely during this time (the early 1900s) that the area became known as "Hogan's Alley," a tongue-in-cheek reference to the setting of Richard F. Outcault's popular comic strip, The Yellow Kid. The Hogan's Alley of the comic strip was an ethnically diverse tenement area typical of certain areas of squalor that existed in North American cities of that era.

By 1914, Strathcona's Black community, centred around Hogan's Alley, likely had a population of approximately 300. A 1957 study published by the City of Vancouver Planning Department described the Black population in Hogan's Alley as "probably a large proportion of the total Negro population in Vancouver", and attributed the Black community's settlement in the East End to three main reasons: "partly its proximity to the railroads where many of them are employed, partly its cheapness and partly the fact that it is traditionally the home of many non-white groups".

== Culture ==
Hogan's Alley was a lively area filled with a number of popular Black cultural institutions. As a result of Mayor L. D. Taylor's governing approach in the 20s and 30s - to focus police resources on major crimes while simply regulating and managing vice crimes - many clubhouses, illegal drinking establishment (Blind Pigs), brothels, and gambling dens operated in the area, as they did in many other areas around Vancouver. Hogan's Alley also housed a red light district prior to Mayor Gerry McGeer's appointment in 1935.

=== The Fountain Chapel ===
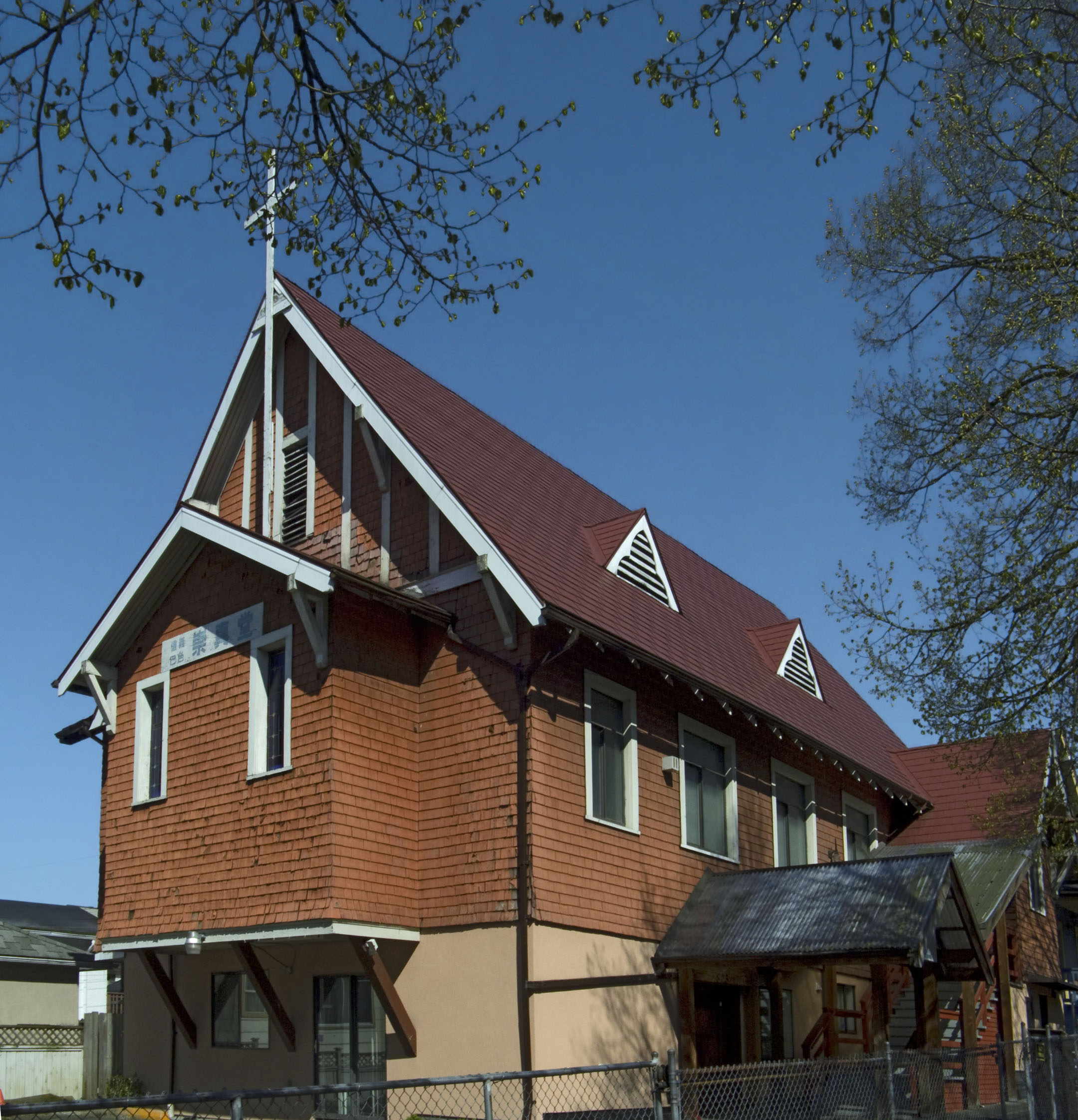
The Fountain Chapel building, 2008

Located at 823 Jackson Avenue, the African Methodist Episcopal (AME) Fountain Chapel was established by several of Hogan's Alley's community members between 1918-1923. In order to buy the building from the previous owners, the Norwegian Lutheran Church, Hogan's Alley residents raised money which was matched by the AME head office in the United States.

Jimi Hendrix's grandmother Nora Hendrix was a prominent Hogan's Alley resident and one of the founders of the Fountain Chapel. She remembers holding "entertainments and bazaars and suppers and everything we could have" in order to fundraise. Once established, the church served as the "cultural hub of the community". The first reverend for the church was an American named Ulysses S. Robinson, and in 1952 the church appointed its first Canadian reverend: J Ivan Moore.

According to Hendrix, the Fountain Chapel would host turkey dinners to celebrate American Thanksgiving, in addition to holding popular chitlin dinners. Hendrix also recalls one Hogan's Alley resident starting a church choir in the twenties. The choir performed in a variety of different locations, including the Avenue Theatre.

The church was sold in the 1980s to the Basel Hakka Lutheran Church. During Black History Month in 2019, a walking tour of the area was held to commemorate the church and celebrate 100 years since its establishment.

=== Local establishments ===
Hogan's Alley and the surrounding area had a number of restaurants and "chicken houses" (often operating as speakeasies). On Union Street was Mother's Tamale and Chilli Parlour, owned by "Mother" Alexander, and Vie's Chicken and Steak House, owned by Viva (Vie) Moore. Vie, whose family was a part of the Black migration in 1858, was born on Salt Spring Island and opened her restaurant at 209 Union Street with her husband Robert in 1948. Vie's Chicken and Steak House stayed in operation (though not by Vie) until 1980. Over the years, Vie's was visited by a number of famous musicians including Louis Armstrong, Sammy Davis Jr., Cab Calloway, Count Basie, Mitzi Gaynor, and Nat King Cole. Many Hogan's Alley residents worked at Vie's, including Nora Hendrix.

Though not directly in Hogan's Alley, Rosa Pryor's Chicken Inn on Keefer Street was the first chicken restaurant, as well as the first restaurant to be owned by a Black woman, in Vancouver. Strathcona resident and day cook Dorothy Nealy recalls that "practically every Black woman in Vancouver" had worked at the Chicken Inn.

The Hogan's Alley area housed many entertainment venues. Resident Buddy White operated a gambling place and "blind pig" in residences on Union and Prior, and the Pullman Porters' Club on Main Street hosted many Black porters working for the nearby railroads. At 247 E. Georgia St. was Leona Risby's Country Club, a restaurant known for its floorshows and jazz musician patrons. Nearby, trombonist Ernie King owned the Harlem Nocturne, the only Black-owned nightclub in Vancouver. The Nocturne was located just outside Hogan's Alley at 343 E. Hastings St.

== Urban renewal ==
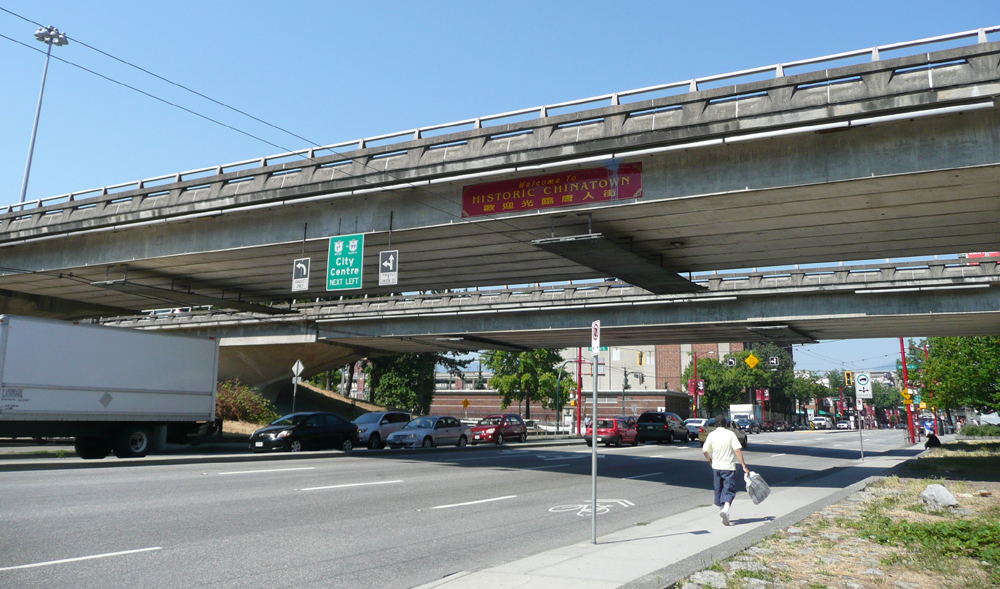
The Georgia and Dunsmuir Viaducts at Main Street, 2010

In 1950, Vancouver social scientist Leonard Marsh published a proposal entitled Rebuilding A Neighbourhood, which described the Strathcona area as a "slum" in need of urban renewal. The Housing Research Committee's 1957 Vancouver Redevelopment Study targeted the Eastside as an area of "urban decay" and proposed major rehabilitation. Subsequently, in the name of "urban renewal" and "slum clearance", much of Hogan's Alley was razed at the end of the 1960s to make way for the Georgia and Dunsmuir Viaducts. Urban renewal initiatives across North America have often disproportionately impacted racialized communities, and Hogan’s Alley was no exception. In 1931, the City of Vancouver rezoned the area as industrial, leading to disinvestment and neglect. This strategic devaluation facilitated the justification for its later demolition. Stephanie Allen notes that such policies, combined with negative media portrayals, contributed to the marginalization and eventual displacement of the Black community in Hogan’s Alley. Scholars have argued that these actions reflect broader patterns of systemic racism in twentieth-century urban planning Viaduct construction lasted from 1967-1971, and the structures opened for use in 1972.

The creation of the viaducts was part of a larger freeway project motivated by Marsh's publication and prepared by the University of British Columbia and the Non-Partisan Association. The plans for the eight-lane freeway and viaduct development were detailed in the Vancouver Transportation Study of 1967, which reached the Vancouver City Council at a public hearing in late 1967. The urban renewal project, which called for "complete demolition of the [East End] area", had been developed largely in secret, and its announcement in 1967 was met with major backlash from Strathcona residents. Community members and civic activists such as Bessie Lee and Mary Lee Chan formed SPOTA (the Strathcona Property Owners and Tenants Association) in response to the proposal, gathering signatures, sharing information, and advocating for their neighbourhood. SPOTA was successful in halting the City's planned demolition - but not before much of Hogan's Alley houses had been levelled and viaduct construction had begun. SPOTA later joined with government members to form the Strathcona Rehabilitation Committee.

The Maclean Park housing developments and the Raymur housing project (now Stamps Place) were built for displaced residents between 1966-1970, however Wayde Compton suggests that many Black community members chose to move out of Strathcona and instead integrate into the larger Vancouver area. In fact, the Hogan's Alley community had already started to leave the area prior to the 1967 proposal and the viaduct construction. This can be attributed to a number of factors, including the City of Vancouver's decision to freeze property values and prevent any home improvement or redevelopment permits from being granted, as well as the lack of "public works maintenance" (such as road paving and sidewalk upkeep).

== Remembering Hogan's Alley ==
=== Cultural Centre ===
In 2015, The City of Vancouver announced their plans to remove the Georgia Viaducts as part of a process of reconciliation. The proposal includes the addition of a 27,000 square foot Cultural Centre to be located in Hogan's Alley. The goal of the Cultural Centre and its programming is to focus on Black Canadian history and community engagement, and its surrounding area will be used for local, culturally-specific businesses. The City also intends to increase walkways to make the area more pedestrian-friendly.

Within the proposal, the City of Vancouver outlined their intentions to establish an ongoing relationship with the Hogan's Alley Working Group, an organization made up of 25 members of Vancouver's Black community who are invested in social justice and cultural representation. Further City plans include collaborating with the Working Group to create "long term leases" and a "land trust" with the Black community.

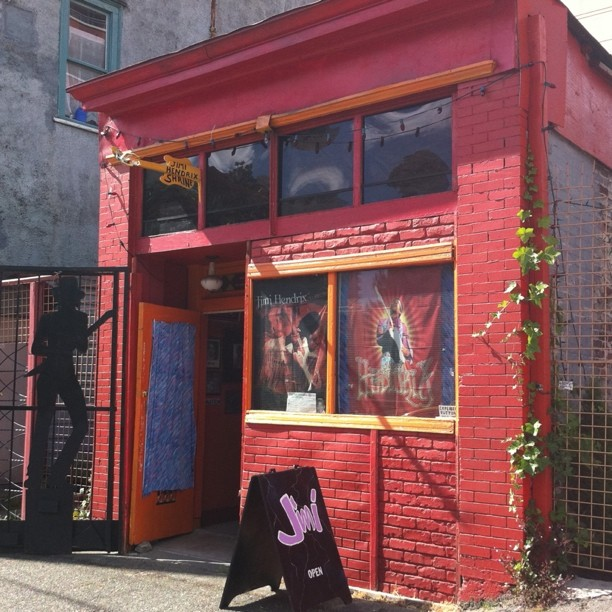
The Jimi Hendrix Shrine, 2011

=== Jimi Hendrix Shrine ===
Though Jimi Hendrix lived in Seattle, he came to Vancouver frequently to visit his grandmother Nora Hendrix, a Hogan's Alley resident. The Jimi Hendrix Shrine was established in the 90s on the corner of Union and Main, in part of the building that once was Vie's Chicken and Steak House. The shrine celebrated the connection between the Hendrixes and Vancouver, featuring pieces of family history and memorabilia. It closed in 2015 when the building was bought for development purposes.

=== Nora Hendrix namesakes ===
The City of Vancouver announced in 2019 that they would name a new set of temporary modular housing units after Nora Hendrix. Nora Hendrix Place is located on Union Street and provides a number of different support services for people experiencing homelessness

In 2021, the proposed naming of the "Nora Hendrix Way" was approved by the City of Vancouver as a tribute to the influential Hogan's Alley resident. The street, to be located between National and Atlantic avenues, is close to the Hogan's Alley church that Hendrix helped establish. Although Rosemary Brown does have a laneway named after her, this will be the first official Vancouver street to be named after a Black woman. The City's naming decision received some criticism from the Hogan's Alley Society for its lack of inclusion of and consultation with Vancouver's Black community during the naming process.

== Notable residents ==
- Barbara Howard: athlete and teacher. Barbara lived in the wider Strathcona area. Her participation in the 1938 British Empire Games marked her as the first Black woman to compete for Canada in an international sporting event. She was later hired by the Vancouver School Board as a teacher, becoming the first visible minority educator to work for the VSB.
- Ernie King: actor, musician (trombonist), and business-owner. Ernie ran the Hastings Street-based Harlem Nocturne, the only Black-owned nightclub in Vancouver.
- Leonard Gibson, Thelma Gibson-Towns, Chic Gibson, and Sy Gibson: artists, dancers, and performers. Leonard was an accomplished dancer/choreographer known for founding the Negro Workshop Dance Group. Leonard was an instrumental part of CBC Television's first musical variety TV show Bamboula, in which his sister Thelma and his brother Chic also performed. Thelma, a successful artist, performer and teacher, toured internationally and taught Afro-Cuban dance. The Black Historical Society of BC awarded her a Lifetime Achievement Award in 2005. Chic was a performer who eventually went on to be the first Black person to work for BC Hydro. Youngest brother Sy was a singer and member of the band Night Train Revue. The four siblings' mother was Leona Risby, owner of the Country Club Inn.
- Leonard Lane: Fountain Chapel member and community activist. Leonard joined the staff of the British Columbia Association for the Advancement of Coloured People in 1958 and later worked as a treasurer for the Unity Credit Union.
- Nora Hendrix: Nora, grandmother of guitarist and performer Jimi Hendrix, immigrated to Vancouver in 1911 from Knoxville, Tennessee and lived in and around Hogan's Alley. She was an active community member, co-founding the Fountain Chapel and working as a cook at Vie's Chicken and Steak House. Though he lived in Seattle, Jimi regularly visited his grandmother and family in Vancouver.
- The Crump Twins: performance duo. Ronnie and Robert Crump were prominent Vancouver entertainers, performing at many local clubs and theatres during the mid 1900s. The brothers were inducted into the BC Entertainment Hall of Fame in 2019.

== Cultural references ==
- The history of the area and Vancouver's Black community was explored in Cornelia Wyngaarden's and Andrea Fatona's 1994 documentary "Hogan's Alley"
- Writer Wayde Compton paid tribute to Hogan's Alley in his poem Rune.
- In 2007, flowers spelling out "Hogan's Alley Welcomes You" were placed in the remaining Hogan's Alley area by The Vancouver Flower Brigade and Laura Marsden
- 2011's Spirit Rising Festival and East End Blues and All That Jazz event honoured the history of Vancouver's Black community through music and residents' stories.
- The alley was recreated in virtual form by Stan Douglas in the 2014 interactive work Circa 1948.
- The alley was mentioned in the 2014 poem "A Love Letter or Considering Reconciliation in Canada" by Otoniya J. Okot Bitek.
- Black Strathcona released a number of historical videos in 2014 highlighting several Hogan's Alley residents.
- In 2014, Canada Post printed several thousand stamps featuring Hogan's Alley residents Nora Hendrix and Fielding William Spotts for Black History Month. The 63 cent stamp was released in tandem with a stamp paying tribute to Africville in Halifax.
- A number of prominent Hogan's Alley residents were honoured in a mural painted by Anthony Joseph on the Georgia Viaduct as part of the 2020 Vancouver Mural Festival.
- Jamila Pomeroy's 2023 documentary film Union Street centres on the history of the neighbourhood.

== See also ==
- History of Vancouver
- Militant Mothers of Raymur
- Strathcona, Vancouver
