= Georgia Viaduct =

Bridge in Vancouver, Canada

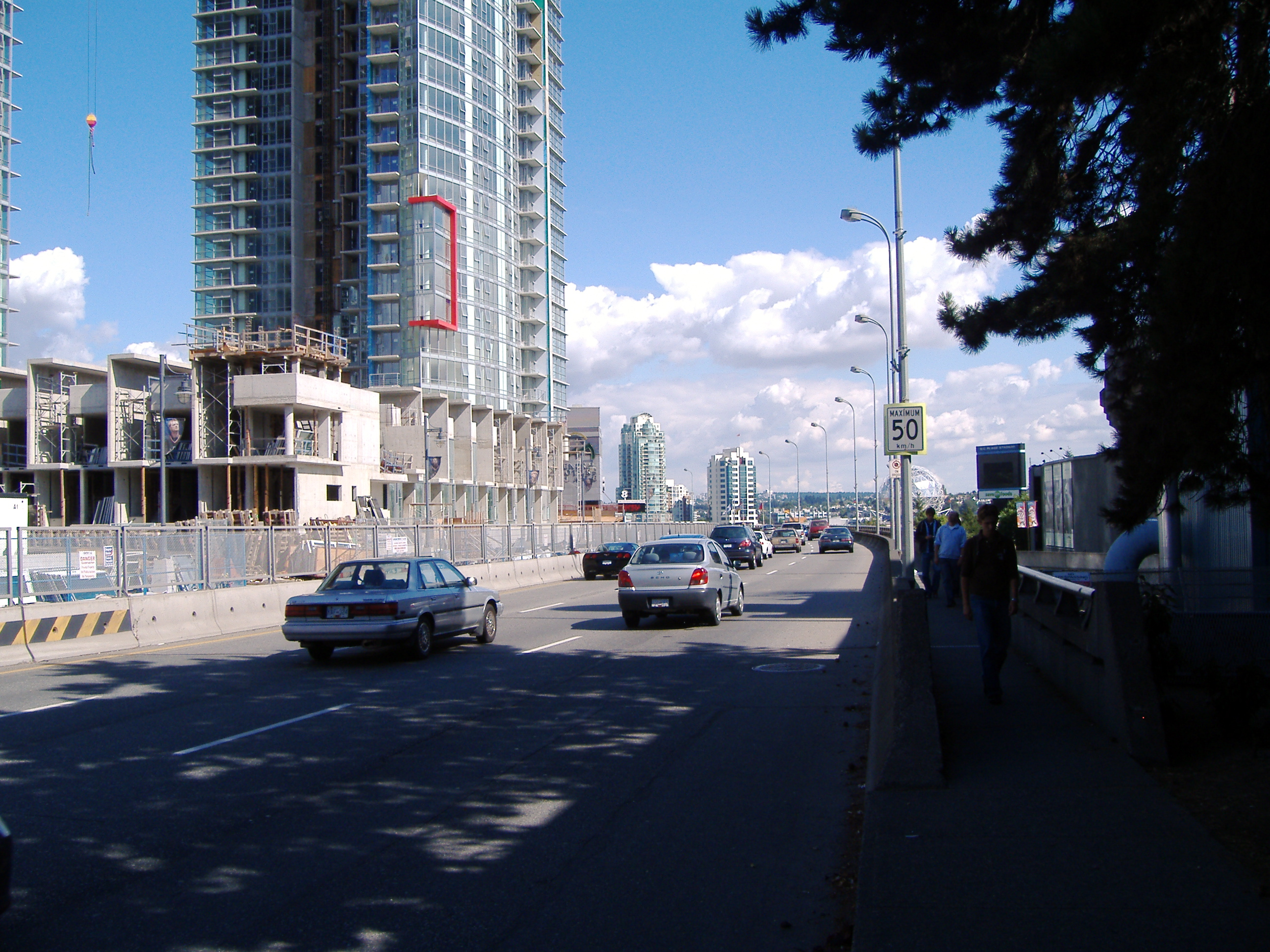
- Georgia Viaduct's eastbound entry point from Beatty St.
- Coordinates: 49.277227°N 123.106409°W
- Carries: 3 lanes of Georgia Street, 2 lanes of Dunsmuir Street, pedestrians and bicycles
- Locale: Vancouver
- Maintained by: City of Vancouver
- Preceded by: Georgia Street Viaduct

History
- Opened: January 9, 1972

Location
- Interactive map of Georgia Viaduct

The Georgia Viaduct is a twinned bridge that acts as a flyover-like overpass in Vancouver, British Columbia, Canada. It passes between Rogers Arena and BC Place Stadium and connects Downtown Vancouver with Main Street and Strathcona.

== History ==
The first Georgia Street Viaduct was built between 1913 and 1915, crossing over the expanding CPR rail yards and a small portion of False Creek. The narrow structure included streetcar tracks that were never used. At one point, every second lamppost was removed to reduce weight. It was replaced between 1971 and 1972 by the current viaduct, in which the two directions of traffic are structurally separated.

The current Georgia Viaduct was envisioned in the early 1970s as replacing the original structure, continuing to overpass the CPR rail yards while forming part of an extensive freeway system for Vancouver. Although communities were opposed to demolition and the expanded freeway plan was scrapped, the replacement viaduct project proceeded. The freeways would have required demolishing buildings in neighbourhoods including Strathcona, the Downtown Eastside and Chinatown. A predominantly Black Canadian community called Hogan's Alley was bulldozed in building the viaduct.

The first phase (Georgia) of the new viaduct opened to traffic on June 28, 1971, and the second phase (Dunsmuir) opened on Jan. 9, 1972, amid protests which attempted to block mayor Tom Campbell's limousine from reaching the western end.

== Traffic flow ==
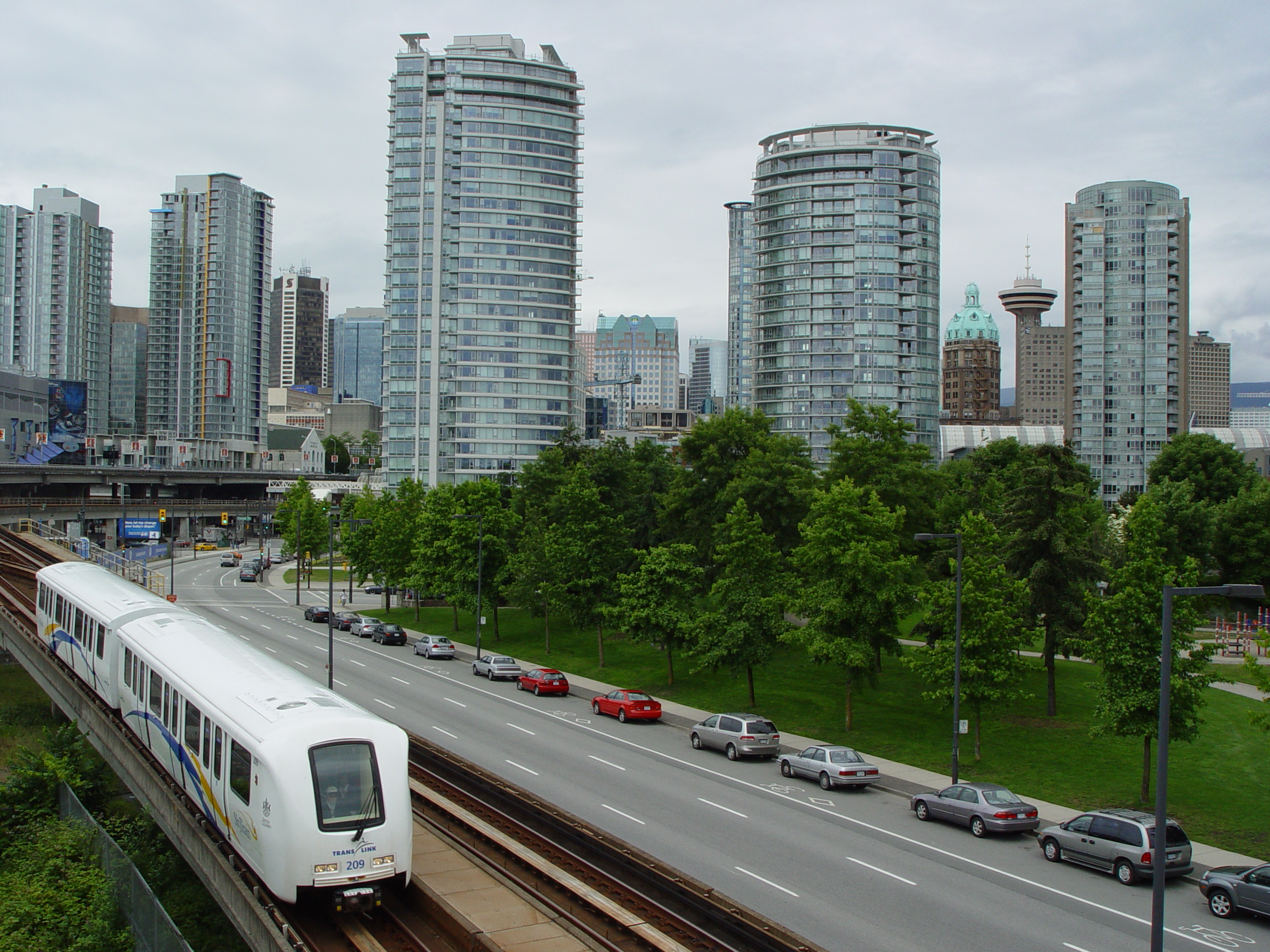
Looking westbound into Vancouver, from the Viaduct's pedestrian sidewalk

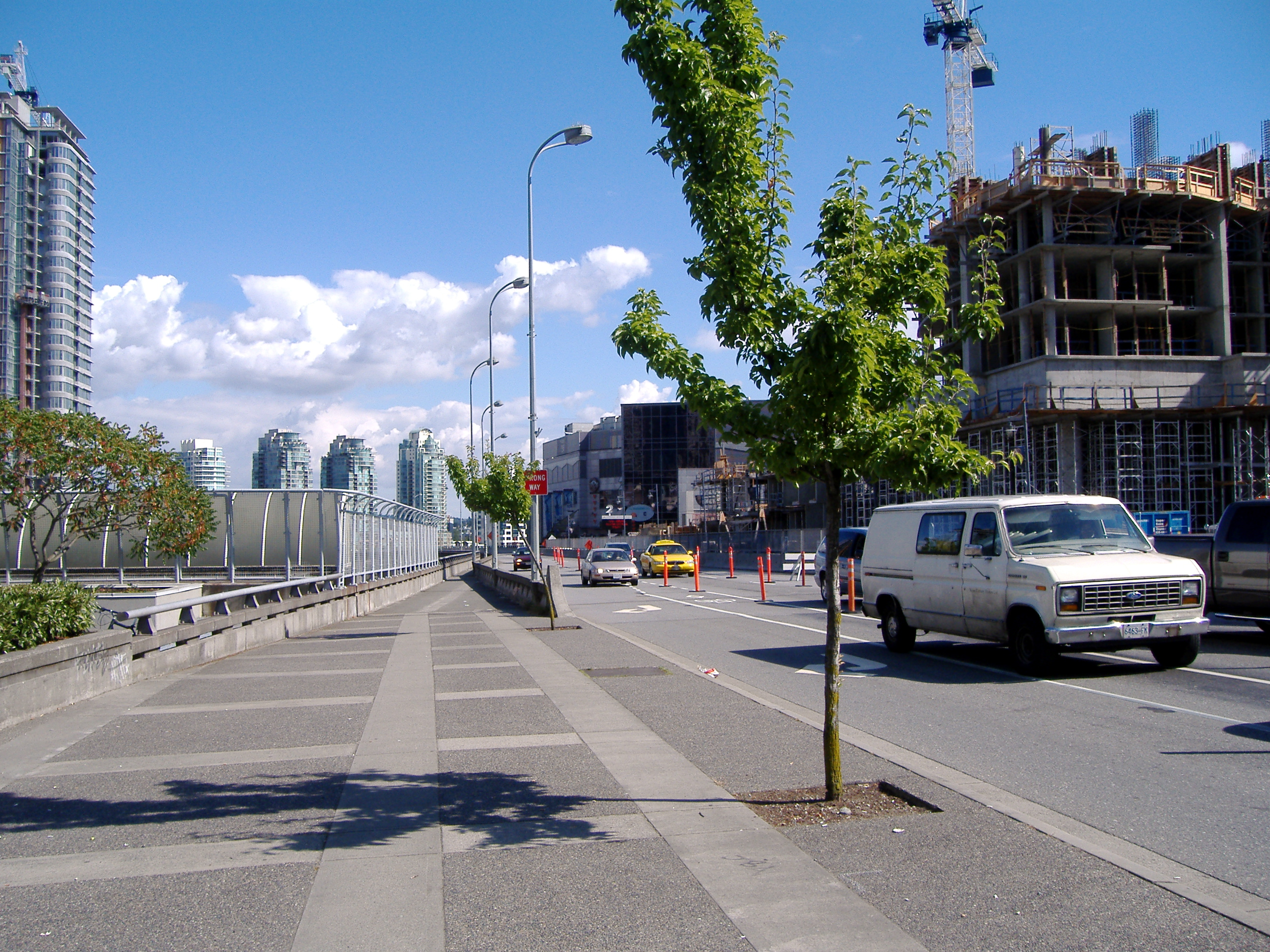
Viaduct's westbound exit point from Beatty St.

The viaduct's eastbound traffic is fed from Georgia Street and leads vehicles to Prior Street and Main Street. The viaduct's westbound lanes—often referred to as Dunsmuir Viaduct because they connect to Dunsmuir Street—pass to the north of Rogers Arena. The westbound traffic comes from Prior Street and Main Street, and carries vehicles and pedestrians to Dunsmuir Street, downtown which feeds into Melville Street and eventually Pender Street.

== Deadpool filming ==
On April 5, 2015, the viaduct was closed for two weeks to allow filming of the movie Deadpool, which was released on February 12, 2016.

== Demolition ==
On October 27, 2015, Vancouver City Council voted to demolish the twin viaducts. A new six-lane road configuration that merges Expo and Pacific boulevards was in the planning stage.

By 2025, the demolition had been delayed indefinitely. There were no plans to redevelop the area until after the 2026 FIFA World Cup.

== See also ==
- Georgia Street
- List of bridges in Canada
