= Georgia Street =

Canadian urban road in Vancouver and Burnaby

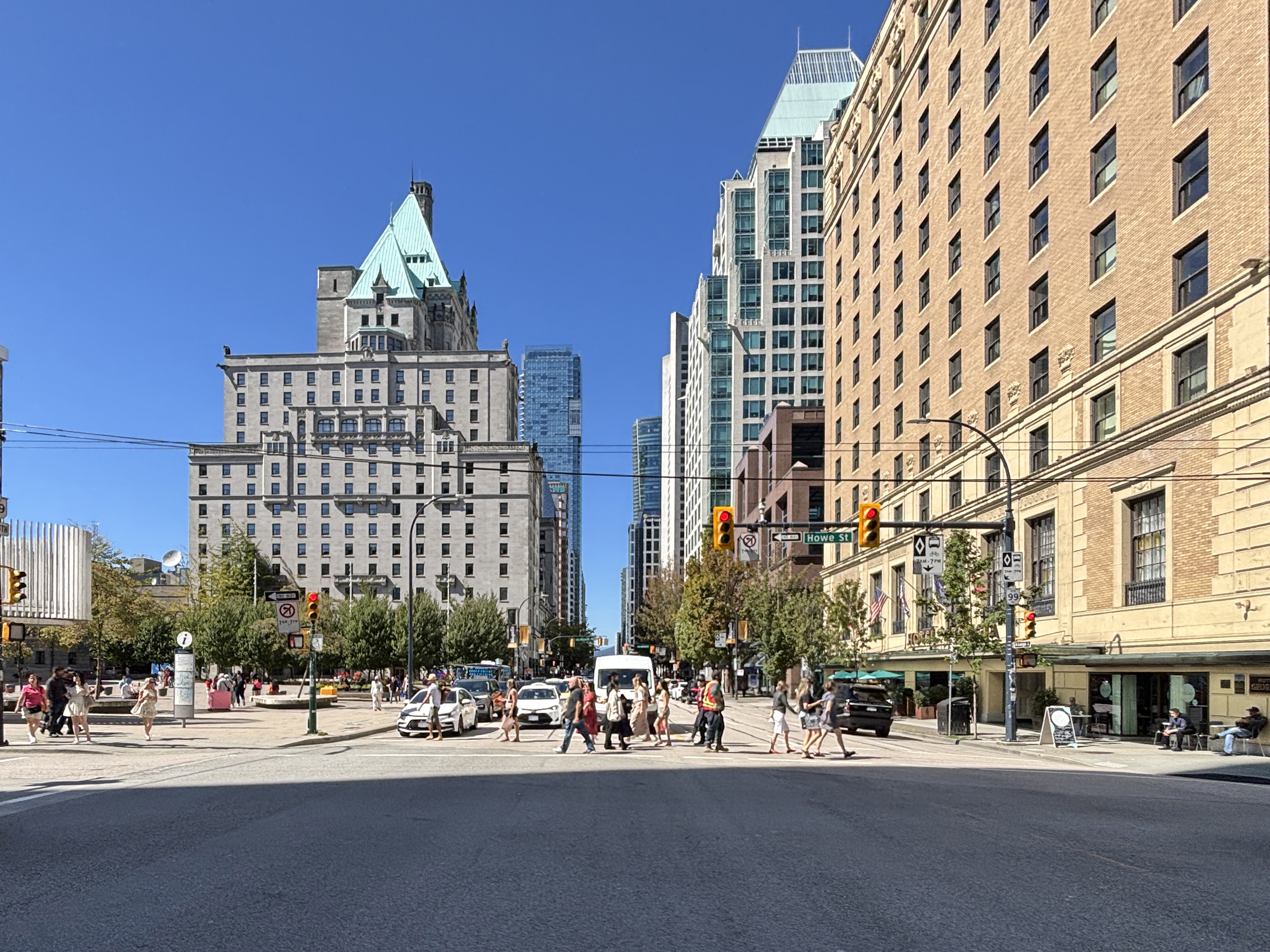
- The intersection of Georgia Street and Howe St in the Financial District in 2025
- Part of: Highway 99
- Namesake: Strait of Georgia
- Type: Street
- Length: 3.7 km (2.3 mi)
- Location: Financial District, Central Business District, Coal Harbour, other
- Nearest metro station: Vancouver City Centre Station
- Northwest end: Stanley Park Causeway (Stanley Park)
- Major junctions: Burrard Street; Howe Street; Granville Street; Seymour Street; Main Street
- Southeast end: Prior Street

Other
- Known for: Primary downtown Vancouver thoroughfare

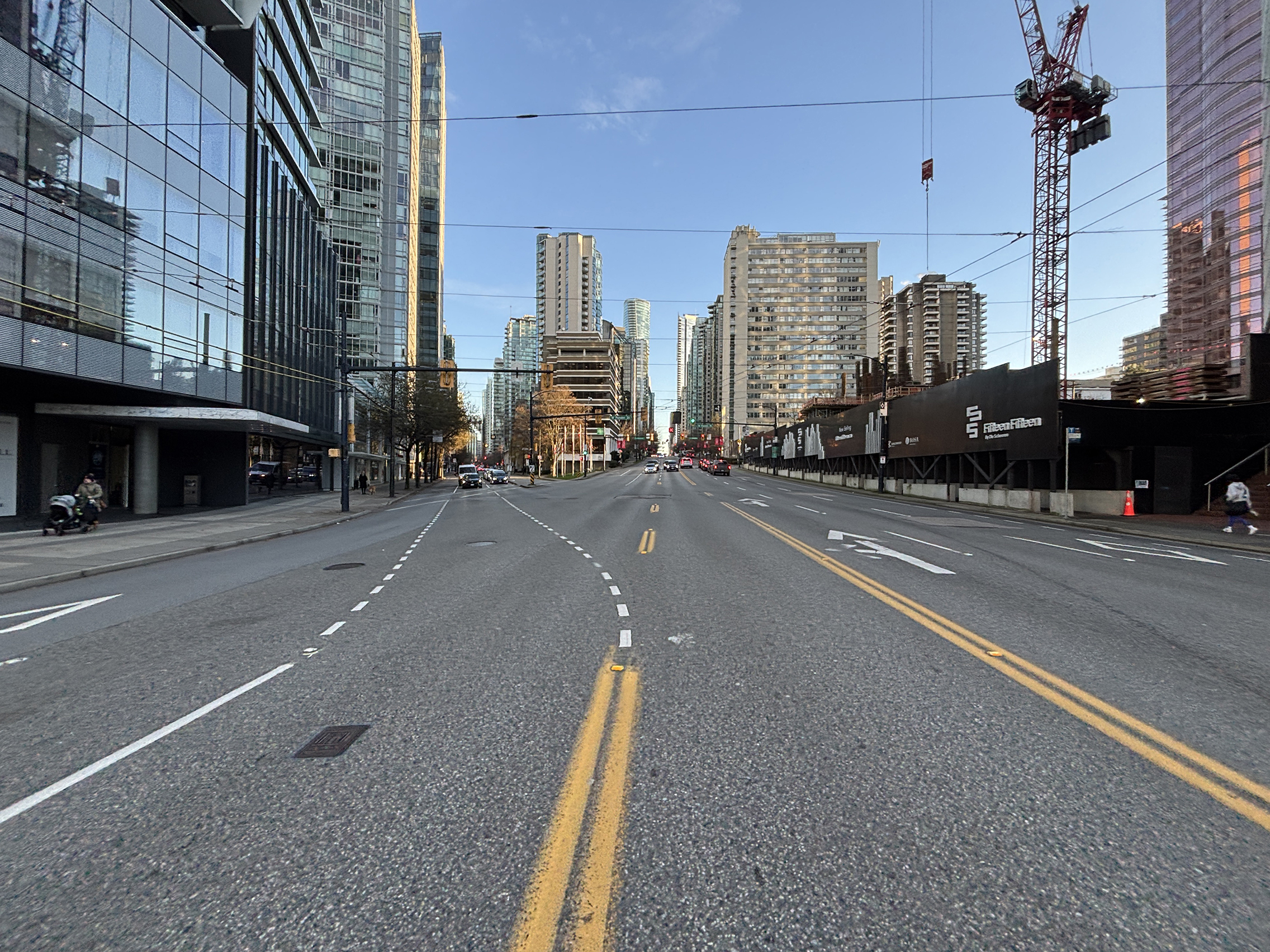
View of West Georgia Street, near the section of West Pender Street (left)

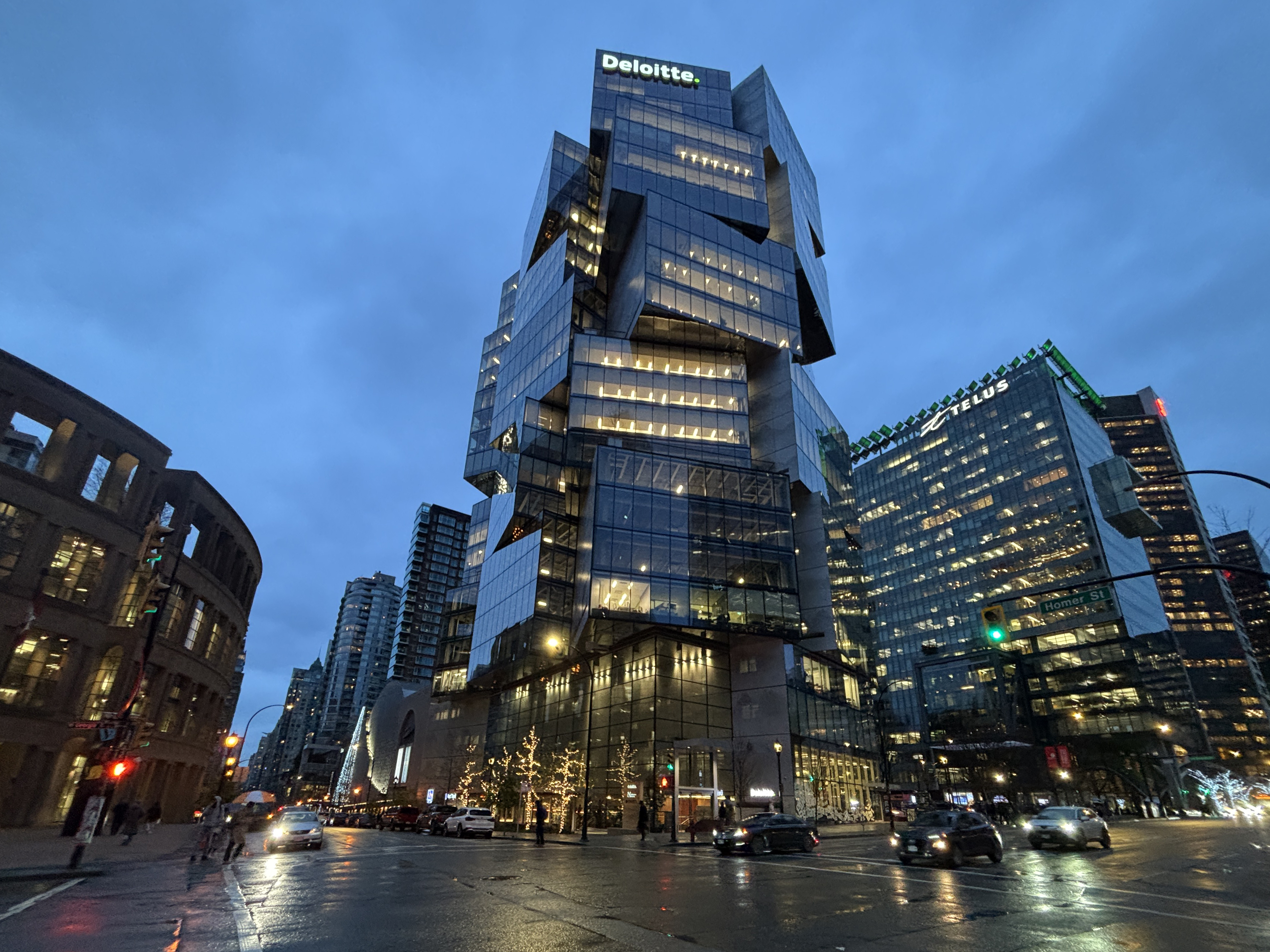
Exterior of 410 West Georgia offices on West Georgia Street

Georgia Street is an east–west street in the cities of Vancouver and Burnaby, British Columbia, Canada. Its section in Downtown Vancouver, designated West Georgia Street, serves as one of the primary streets for the financial and central business districts, and is the major transportation corridor connecting downtown Vancouver with the North Shore (and eventually Whistler) by way of the Lions Gate Bridge. The remainder of the street, known as East Georgia Street between Main Street and Boundary Road and simply Georgia Street within Burnaby, is more residential in character, and is discontinuous at several points.

West of Seymour Street, the thoroughfare is part of Highway 99. The entire section west of Main Street was previously designated part of Highway 1A, and markers for the '1A' designation can still be seen at certain points.

== Route ==
Starting from its western terminus at Chilco Street by the edge of Stanley Park, Georgia Street runs southeast, separating the West End from the Coal Harbour neighbourhood. It then runs through the Financial District; landmarks and major skyscrapers along the way include Living Shangri-La, The Paradox Hotel Vancouver, Royal Centre, 666 Burrard tower, Hotel Vancouver and upscale shops, the HSBC Canada Building, the Vancouver Art Gallery, Georgia Hotel, Four Seasons Hotel, Pacific Centre, the Granville Entertainment District, Scotia Tower, Telus Garden and the Canada Post headquarters. The eastern portion of West Georgia features the Theatre District (including Queen Elizabeth Theatre and the Centre in Vancouver for the Performing Arts), Library Square (the central branch of the Vancouver Public Library), Rogers Arena, and BC Place. West Georgia's centre lane between Pender Street and Stanley Park is used as a counterflow lane.

East of Cambie Street, Georgia Street becomes a one-way street for eastbound traffic, and connects to the Georgia Viaduct for eastbound travellers only, which subsequently flows into Prior Street after crossing Main Street; westbound traffic is handled by Dunsmuir Street and the Dunsmuir Viaduct, located one block to the north.

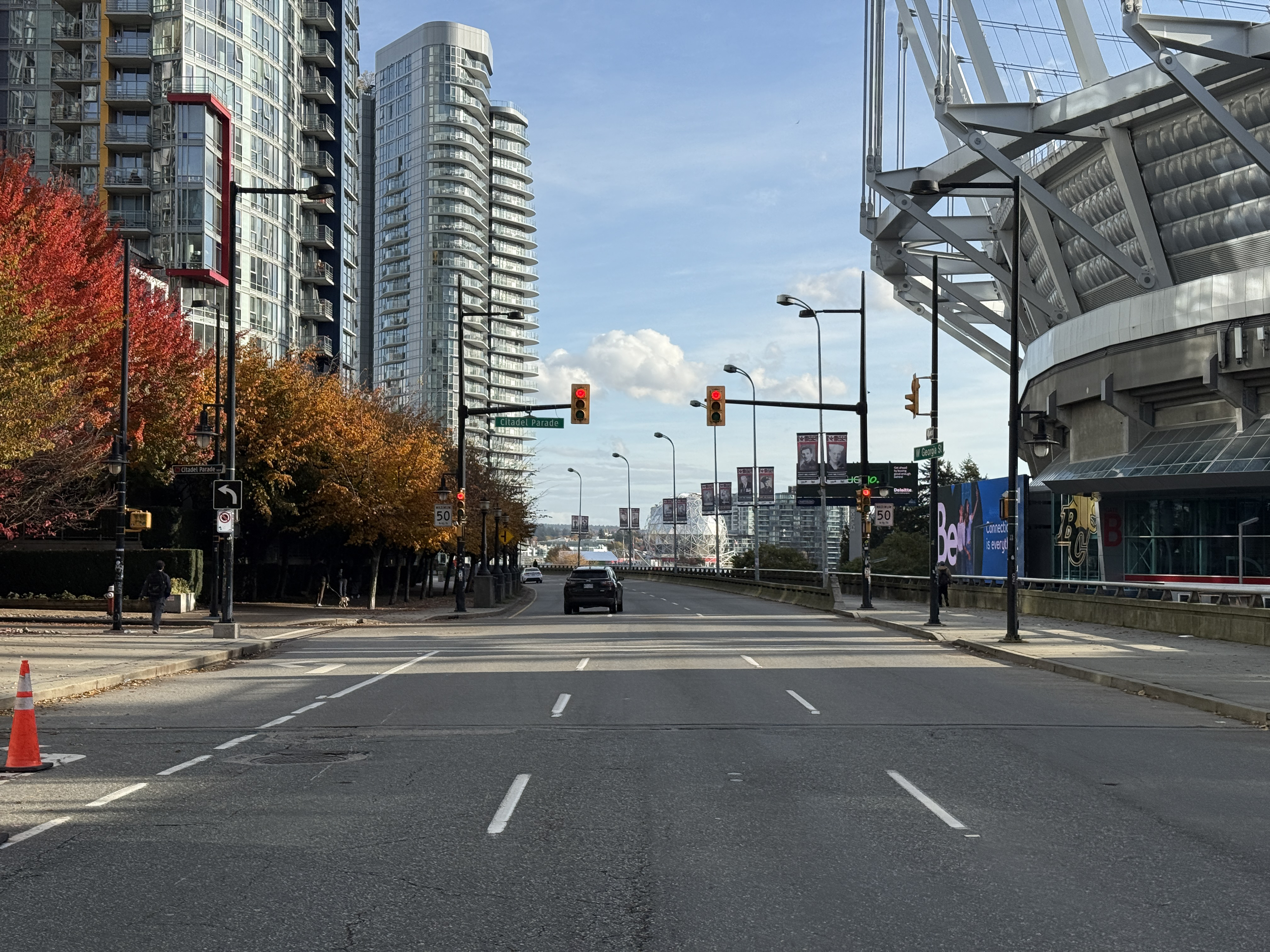
Georgia St. Viaduct's entry point from Beatty Street, between BC Place (right) and condo Spectrum

East Georgia Street begins at an intersection with Main Street to the north of the Georgia and Dunsmuir Viaducts in Vancouver's Chinatown, then runs eastwards through Strathcona, Grandview–Woodland and Hastings–Sunrise to Boundary Road. East of the municipal boundary, Georgia Street continues eastwards through Burnaby until its terminus at Grove Avenue in the Lochdale neighbourhood. This portion of Georgia Street is interrupted at several locations, such as Templeton Secondary School, Highway 1 and Kensington Park.

== History ==
Georgia Street was named in 1886 after the Strait of Georgia and ran between Chilco and Beatty Streets. After the first Georgia Viaduct opened in 1915, the street's eastern end was connected to Harris Street, and Harris Street was subsequently renamed East Georgia Street.

The second Georgia Viaduct, opened in 1972, connects to Prior Street at its eastern end instead. As a result, East Georgia Street has been disconnected from West Georgia ever since.

On June 15, 2011, Georgia Street became the focal point of the 2011 Vancouver Stanley Cup riot.

== Major intersections ==
West Georgia Street; from north to south.

Location	km	mi	Destinations	Notes
West Vancouver	−4.1	−2.5	Marine Drive (Highway 99 north) to Highway 1 / Capilano Road – Horseshoe Bay ferry terminal, Whistler, North Vancouver	Former Highway 1A west; north end of Hwy 99 / former Hwy 1A concurrency; north end of lane control
Burrard Inlet	−3.8– −2.3	−2.4– −1.4	Lions Gate Bridge	
Vancouver	−2.3	−1.4	Enters Stanley Park	Becomes Stanley Park Causeway
Vancouver	−2.0	−1.2	Stanley Park Drive	Grade separated; no southbound entrance; closed during peak hours
Vancouver	−0.3	−0.19	North Lagoon Drive	Grade separated; no southbound exit
Vancouver	0.0	0.0	Exits Stanley Park	Becomes West Georgia Street
Vancouver	0.0	0.0	Chilco Street	Intersection permanently closed
Vancouver	0.3	0.19	Denman Street	
Vancouver	0.7	0.43	West Pender Street	South end of lane control
Vancouver	1.6	0.99	Burrard Street	
Vancouver	1.8	1.1	Howe Street (Highway 99 south) – Airport, Tsawwassen ferry terminal, Canada–United States border	One-way, southwest bound; south end of Hwy 99 south concurrency; north end of former Highway 99A concurrency (northern terminus)
Vancouver	1.9	1.2	Granville Street	Granville Mall (transit only); near Vancouver City Centre station
Vancouver	2.0	1.2	Seymour Street (Highway 99 north)	One-way, northeast-bound; south end of Hwy 99 north concurrency
Vancouver	2.4	1.5	Cambie Street	Roadway becomes one-way, southeast-bound; northwest-bound traffic follows Dunsmuir Street
Vancouver	2.6– 3.6	1.6– 2.2	Georgia Viaduct	
Vancouver	3.5	2.2	Main Street	Grade separated; south end of former Hwy 1A / Hwy 99A concurrency
Vancouver	3.7	2.3	Gore Avenue Prior Street	Continues east as Prior Street
1.000 mi = 1.609 km; 1.000 km = 0.621 mi: Closed/former; Concurrency terminus; HOV only; Incomplete access; Route transition
