= Fountain Chapel =

Church building in Vancouver, Canada

Coordinates: 49.2770°N 123.0939°W

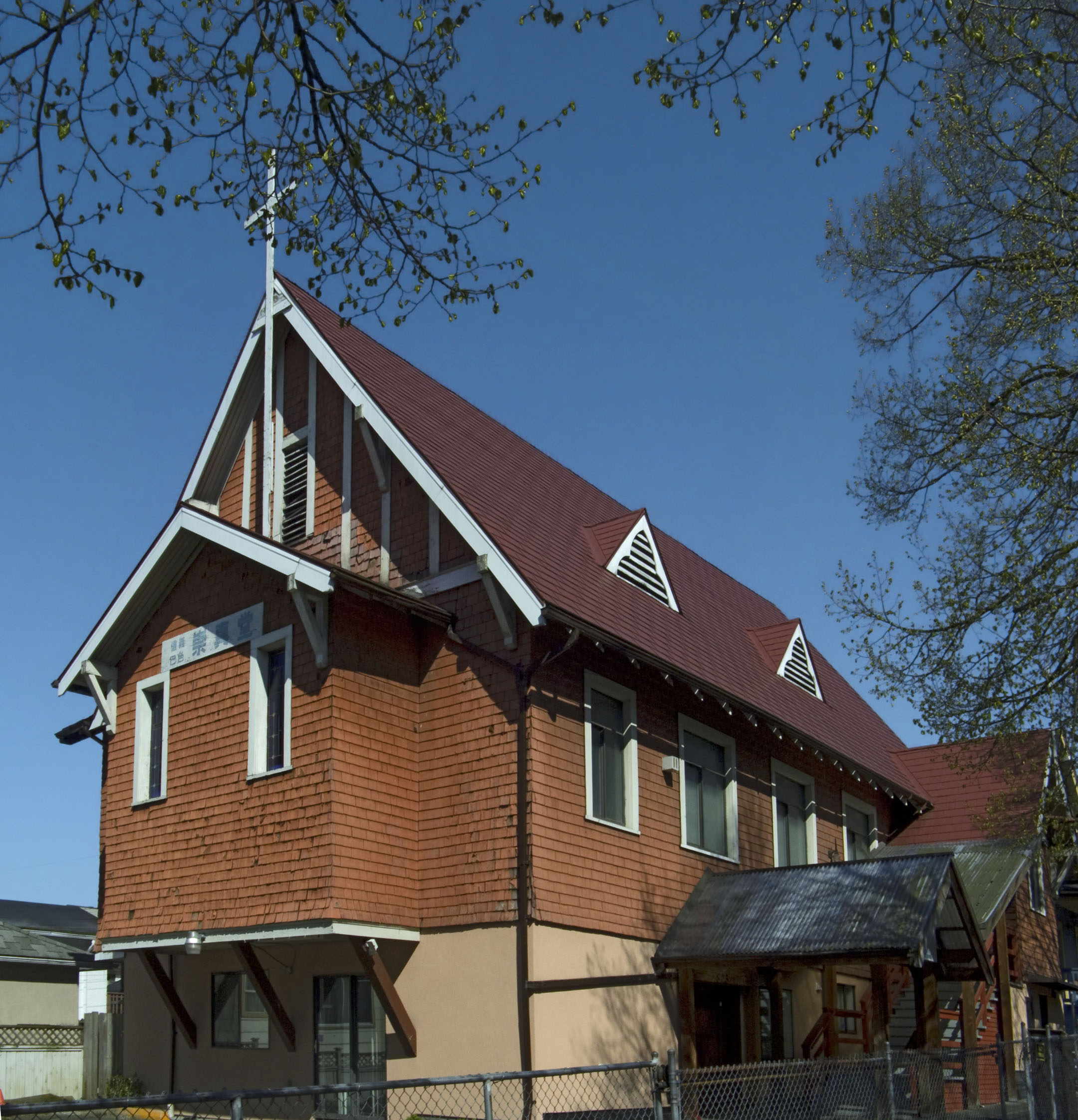

The Fountain Chapel was a church located at 823 Jackson Avenue in Vancouver, British Columbia from 1918 until 1985. It was the local chapter of the African Methodist Episcopal Church (AME) and was co-founded by Nora Hendrix (grandmother of guitarist Jimi Hendrix) to serve Vancouver's black community. Although not officially designated a heritage structure, the building is one of a few markers of the black community that once flourished in this part of Vancouver.

Before the establishment of the Fountain Chapel, black Christians held services in rented halls around town, and eventually a small group decided they should have a permanent church of their own. They set out to raise funds for the project and arranged for the AME to match the amount raised locally. Once financing was secured, they purchased the building on Jackson Avenue that was built in 1910 and had served as a Lutheran church for German and Scandinavian immigrants.

The AME is a well-established Christian denomination that was founded in 1816 by African Americans in response to the racism they encountered in non-segregated churches. As such, the AME was an important institution for black opposition to antebellum slavery and anti-black racism generally.

The AME's activist tradition continued in Vancouver. The church was the locus for organizing against racism on more than one occasion. In the 1922-1923 trial of Fred Deal, a railroad porter charged with murdering Vancouver police constable and Victoria Cross recipient Robert McBeath, the congregation of the Fountain Chapel mobilized to ensure that the likelihood Deal was racially targeted by police was accounted for in the verdict. Consequently, the case was re-tried, and Deal's original death sentence was reduced to life in prison. In another case in the 1950s, the Fountain Chapel was used to voice the black community's demands for an inquiry into the police beating of Clarence Clemons, a black longshoreman, who died shortly after the incident in question.

The black community that had geographically coalesced around the Fountain Chapel in the city's East End was displaced during the city's slum clearance programs of the 1950s and 1960s. In 1985, not long after Nora Hendrix's death, the AME sold the building, which housed the Basel Hakka Lutheran Church from then until 2008, when the building was officially decommissioned as a church and became a private residence. The building is situated at the eastern edge of what was once Hogan's Alley. On January 30, 2014, Canada Post issued a stamp commemorating Hogan's Alley, and the Official First Day Cover depicts an illustration of the Fountain Chapel.
