= Carnegie Center =

Carnegie Center or Carnegie Centre may refer to the following venues:

- Carnegie Centennial Centre, Toronto, Ontario
- Carnegie Center for Art & History, New Albany, Indiana
- Carnegie Center for Arts and History, Jackson, Tennessee
- Carnegie Centre (Oklahoma City), Oklahoma
- Carnegie Center (Port Huron Museum), Port Huron, Michigan
