= Main Street (Vancouver) =

Major road in Vancouver, British Columbia

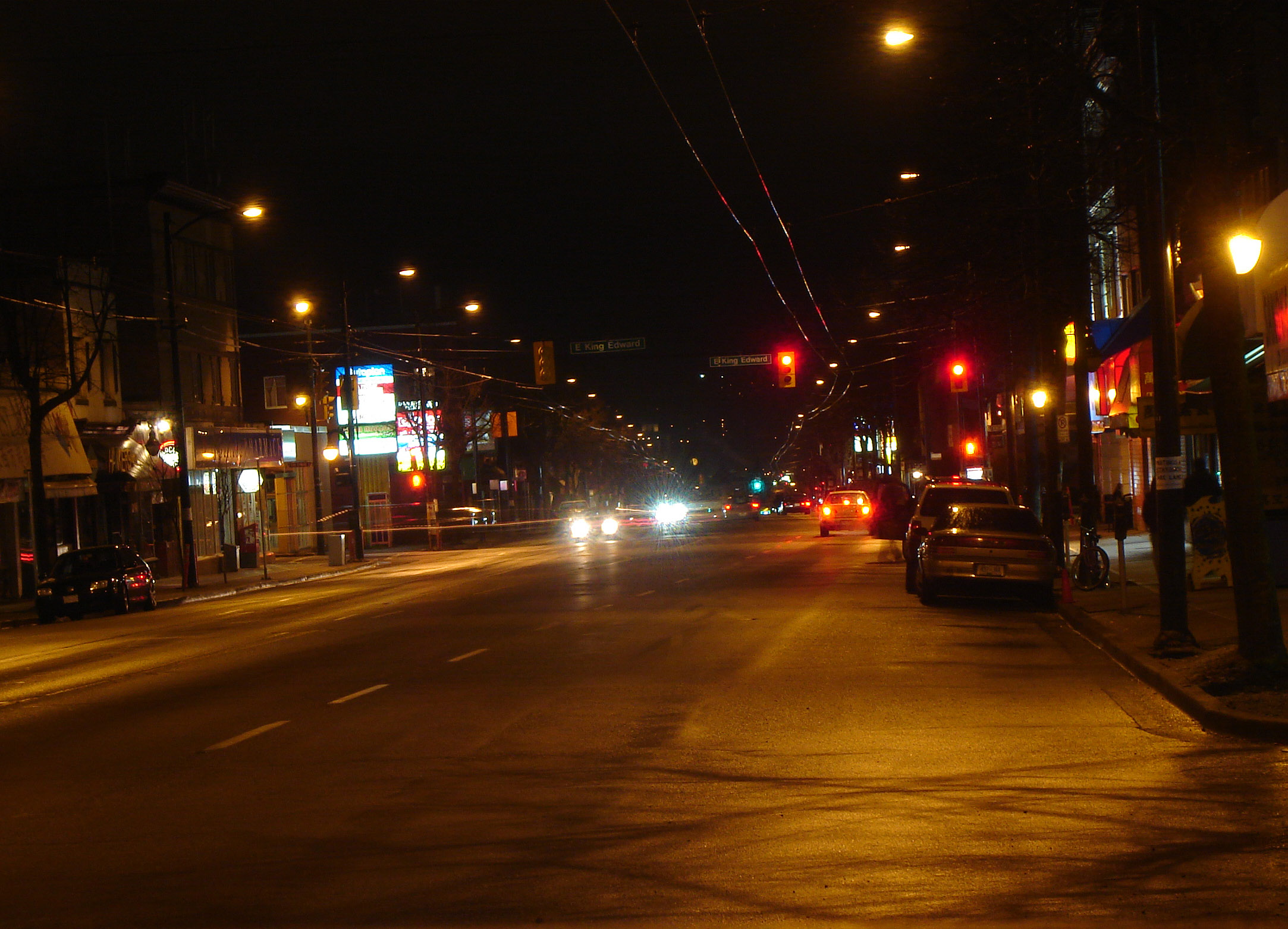
- Main Street at night near 26th Avenue, looking north
- Part of: Former Highway 1A / Highway 99A
- Type: Street
- Length: 8.8 km (5.5 mi)
- Location: Vancouver, British Columbia, Canada
- North end: Waterfront Road
- Major junctions: Hastings Street; Georgia Street / Dunsmuir Street; Kingsway; Broadway; 41st Avenue; SE Marine Drive
- South end: Kent Avenue

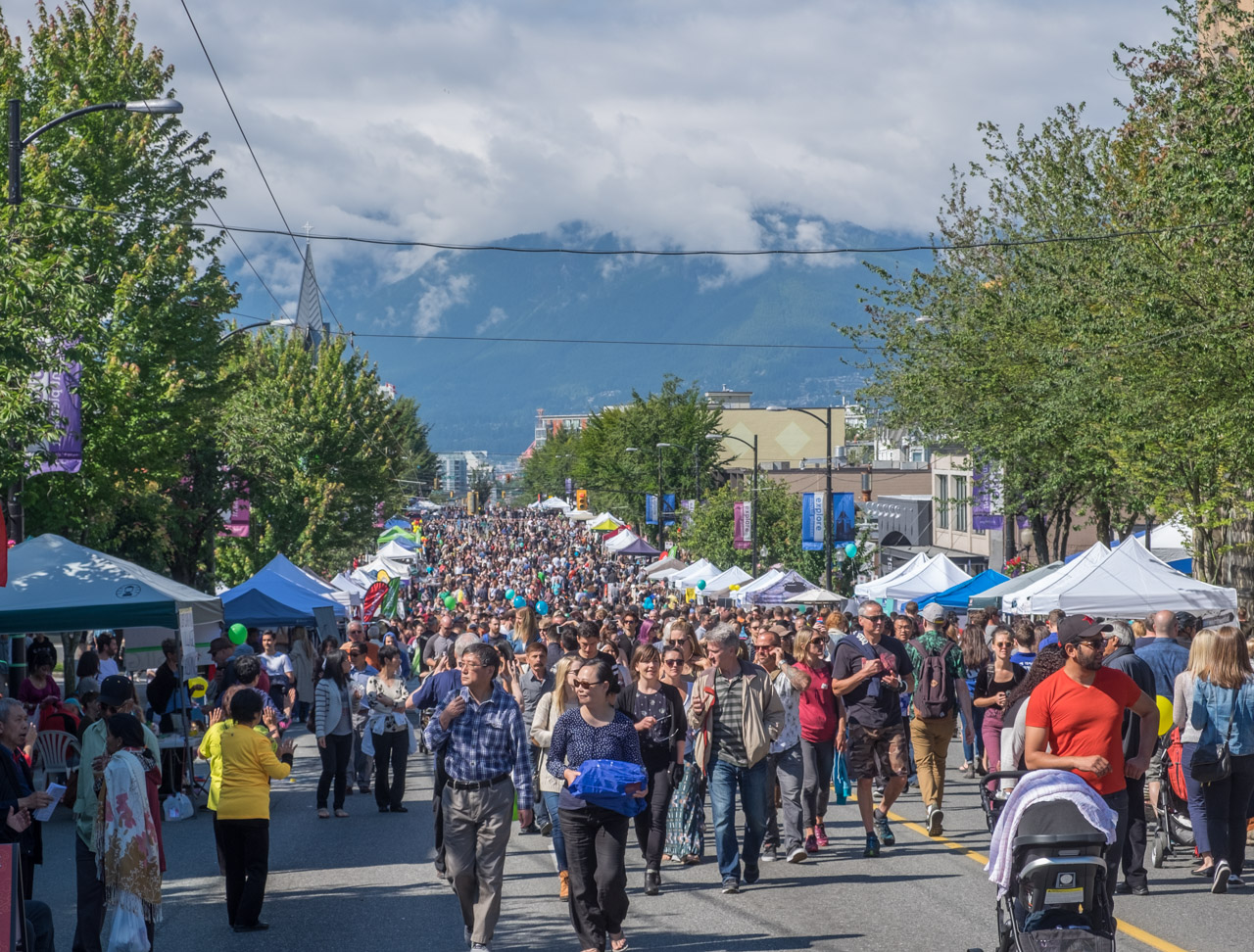
Looking north on Vancouver's Main Street on Car-Free Day, June 19, 2016

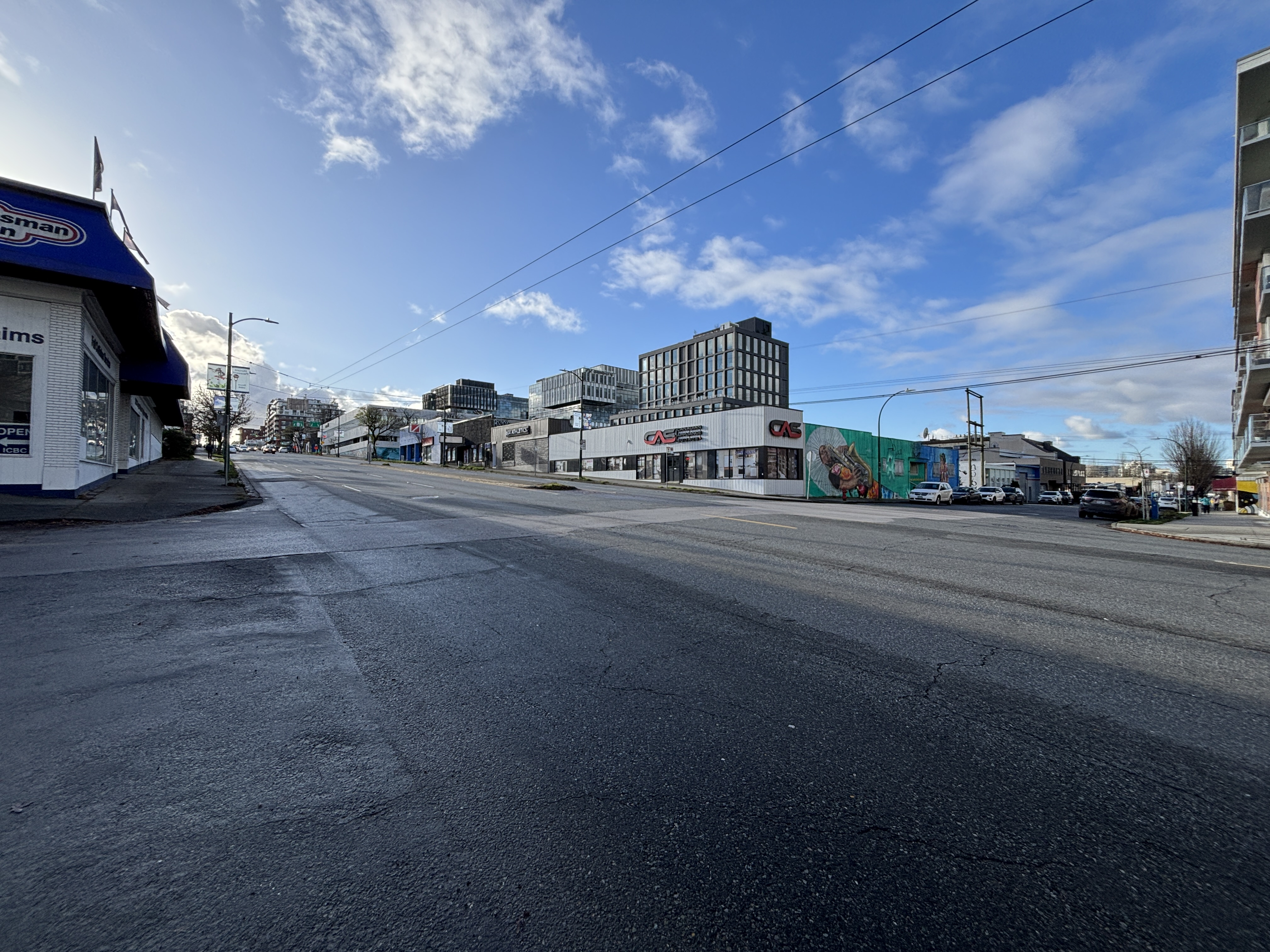
Main Street at 3rd Avenue, looking south

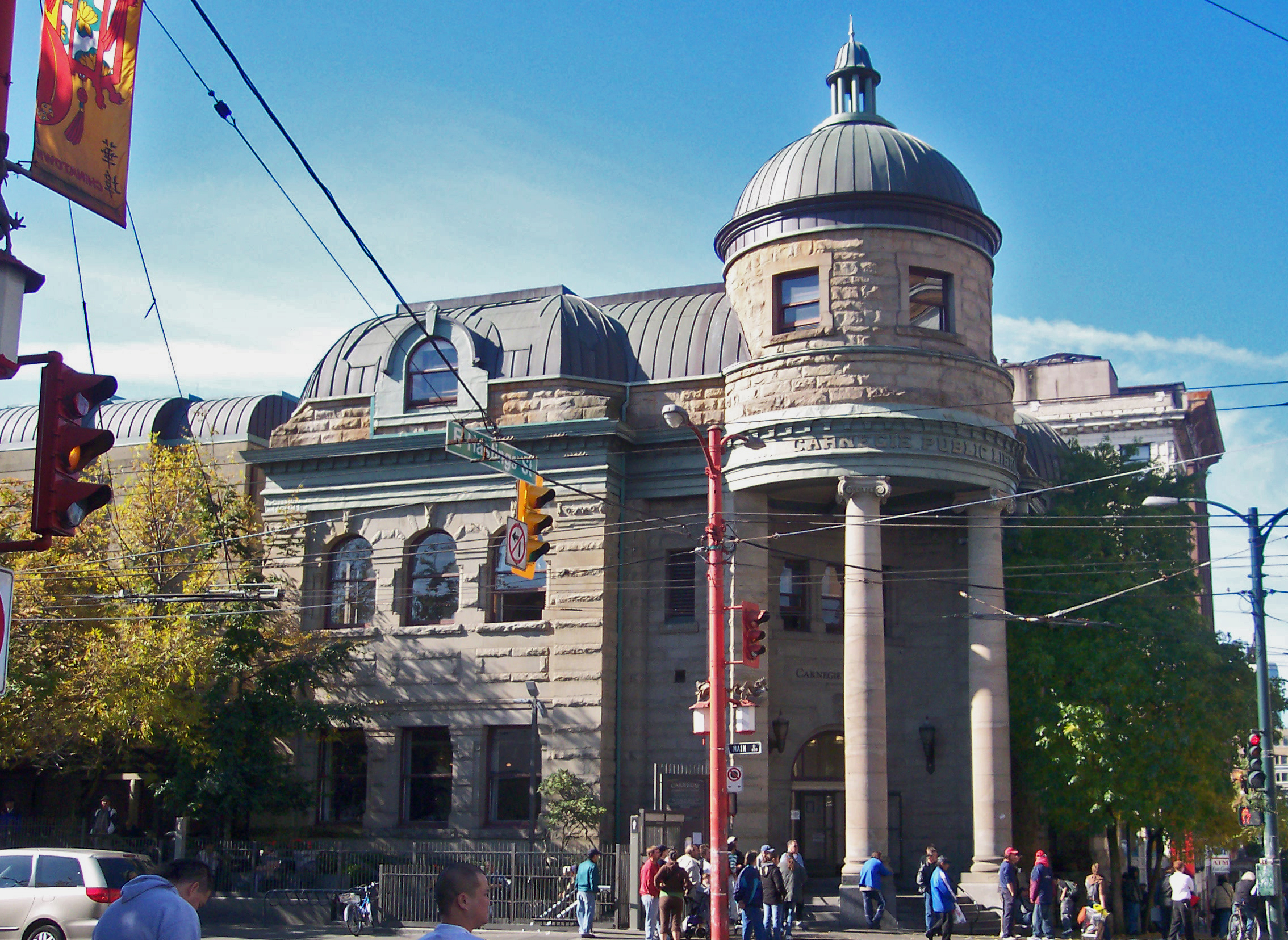
The Carnegie Centre at Main and Hastings

Main Street is a major north–south thoroughfare bisecting Vancouver, British Columbia, Canada. It runs from Waterfront Road by Burrard Inlet in the north, to Kent Avenue alongside the north arm of the Fraser River in the south.

== Route ==
Beginning by the Port of Vancouver terminals near the nexus of the city's historic Downtown Eastside and Gastown districts, the street runs south through Chinatown south of Hastings Street and continues past the Pacific Central railway station and the Main Street–Science World SkyTrain station. At Terminal Avenue, it slopes up into the Mount Pleasant neighbourhood, which mixes commerce, light industry, brewing, and high-density residential areas. The residential/commercial mix continues south of Broadway, with a high density of restaurants and fashion retailing. This neighbourhood was once blue-collar but is growing distinctly upscale.

Between 33rd Avenue and 41st Avenue, the street becomes decidedly more residential as it reaches its topographical summit. South of 41st Avenue, the street enters the Sunset neighbourhood and takes on a markedly Indo-Canadian character. The Punjabi Market district begins just north of 49th Avenue; south of the Market the street again becomes predominantly residential.

At the intersection of Main Street and Marine Drive in southern Vancouver, the area is primarily characterized by big-box commercial development, including a Real Canadian Superstore supermarket. From this intersection to the southern terminus, Main Street consists of commercial uses, including office space, manufacturing, and warehousing.

== History ==
The north end of Main Street is located just west of the historic site of Hastings Mill, the nucleus around which the settlement of Granville, later Vancouver, grew. In its earliest days, the intersection of Main Street and Hastings Street was the centre of downtown Vancouver, boasting the city's central public library (now the Carnegie Centre) and — a few blocks away — the old City Hall. The intersection of Main and Hastings is now a local byword for the poverty, addictions, homelessness, and prostitution often associated with the Downtown Eastside.

The thoroughfare was originally named "Westminster Avenue", since it connects to New Westminster Road (now Kingsway). It received its present name in 1910 at the behest of local merchants, who thought that it bestowed a more cosmopolitan air to the neighbourhood.

Main Street was previously separated into two segments by False Creek, with a bascule bridge linking the two. The two segments were joined together after the eastern section of False Creek was reclaimed for railway lands in the 1910s and 1920s.

== Neighbourhoods ==
Main Street passes through the following Vancouver neighbourhoods (north to south):

- Downtown Eastside
- Paueru Gai
- Chinatown
- Strathcona
- Mount Pleasant
- Riley Park–Little Mountain
- Punjabi Market
- Sunset

== Major intersections ==
From north to south. The entire route is in Vancouver.

km	mi	Destinations	Notes
0.0	0.0	Waterfront Road	
0.3	0.19	Powell Street	One-way pair
0.4	0.25	E Cordova Street	One-way pair
0.5	0.31	East Hastings Street	Former Highway 7A
0.6	0.37	East Pender Street	
0.9	0.56	Union Street, Dunsmuir Street to Highway 99 – City Centre	Former Highway 1A west / Highway 99A north; north end of former Highway 1A / Highway 99A concurrency; access to/from Georgia & Dunsmuir Viaducts
1.0	0.62	Prior Street, West Georgia Street	Former Highway 1A west / Highway 99A north; north end of former Highway 1A / Highway 99A concurrency; access to/from Georgia & Dunsmuir Viaducts
1.5	0.93	Terminal Avenue	Main Street–Science World station; access to Pacific Central Station and Science World
1.9	1.2	East 2nd Avenue	
2.4	1.5	Kingsway	Former Highway 1A east / Highway 99A south; south end of former Highway 1A / Highway 99A concurrency
2.6	1.6	East Broadway (Highway 7)	
2.9	1.8	East 12th Avenue	
4.2	2.6	King Edward Avenue	
5.1	3.2	East 33rd Avenue	Access to Queen Elizabeth Park
5.9	3.7	East 41st Avenue	
6.8	4.2	East 49th Avenue	
8.4	5.2	Southeast Marine Drive	
8.8	5.5	Kent Avenue N	
1.000 mi = 1.609 km; 1.000 km = 0.621 mi: Concurrency terminus
