= Leonard Marsh =

Canadian social scientist (1906–1983)

- Born: Leonard Charles Marsh; September 24, 1906; England
- Died: May 10, 1983 (aged 76)
- Education: London School of Economics
- Occupation(s): Professor and Social Scientist
- Organization: McGill University
- Notable work: Canadians In and Out of Work; A Survey of Economic Classes and Their Relation to the Labour Market

Leonard Charles Marsh (September 24, 1906 – May 10, 1983) was a Canadian social scientist and professor.

== Early life and education ==
Marsh was born in England and graduated from the London School of Economics in 1928. After graduation, he studied wages and housing and conducted research for Sir William Beveridge.

== Move to Canada ==
Marsh moved to Canada in 1930, after being hired as a Director of Social Research at McGill University. McGill was taking part in two American-funded research projects at the time, the Canadian Frontiers of Settlement Project and the Social Science Research Project. Marsh was hired through a grant from the Rockefeller Foundation and named project director for the SSRP. While Director, Marsh published several books on employment in Canada, including Health and Unemployment in 1938. The pivotal text to emerge from Marsh's role as project director was Canadians In and Out of Work; A Survey of Economic Classes and Their Relation to the Labour Market in 1940.

== Subsequent career ==
Leonard Marsh joined the League for Social Reconstruction in 1932 and served as president for two terms, 1937–1938 and 1938–1939. With Harry Cassidy, he edited the League's key publication, Social Planning for Canada, which was published in 1935.

Canadians In and Out of Work was one of the first significant works to analyse class in Canada and remained the most comprehensive study of the subject until John Porter's release of The Vertical Mosaic. The work was not well received by the business community. Marsh and the Social Science Research Project proved to be an irritant to the university and funders and funding was not renewed when the grant ran out in 1940.

Leonard Marsh went on to be named research director for the Federal Government's Advisory Committee on Reconstruction under chair Frank Cyril James in 1941. In early December 1942, the British Government released the Beveridge Report which called for the creation of a postwar welfare state. It was popular in Canada which led Mackenzie King, the Liberal prime minister, to ask James and Marsh to prepare a similar report for Canada in mid-December. Marsh took on the task immediately and with the help of several staff members he was able to complete a draft report in just three months. The Report on Social Security for Canada was submitted to Parliament on March 15, 1943. It called for the establishment of a broad range of social assistance, social insurance and public welfare programs. It subsequently became known colloquially known as "The Marsh Report". Despite the favourable publicity it received in 1943, the report was largely ignored in the short term. Some have even postulated that it was a source of embarrassment for the King government.

In the longer-term many of the Marsh Report's recommendations would come into being in the postwar years. For this reason it is often referred to a blueprint for the development of the Canadian welfare state.

He left the Advisory Committee to become welfare adviser to the United Nations Relief and Rehabilitation Administration from 1944-46.

Marsh was hired by the University of British Columbia's School of Social Work in 1947. In 1959, he was named Director of Research. Marsh joined the Faculty of Education in 1964 as a professor of Educational Sociology. He retired in 1972 and was named Professor Emeritus the same year.

== Notable works ==
- Health and Unemployment: Some Studies of Their Relationships. Published for McGill University by Oxford University Press, 1938.
- Canadians In and Out of Work; A Survey of Economic Classes and Their Relation to the Labour Market. Published for McGill University by the Oxford University Press, 1940.
- Report on Social Security for Canada. Toronto: University of Toronto Press, 1975.
- Rebuilding A Neighbourhood; Report on a Demonstration Slum-Clearance and Urban Rehabilitation Project in a Key Central Area in Vancouver. Vancouver, University of British Columbia, 1950.
- Communities in Canada: Selected Sources. Toronto: McClelland, 1970.

With the League for Social Reconstruction

- League for Social Reconstruction, Research Committee. Social Planning for Canada. Toronto: T. Nelson, 1935.
- League for Social Reconstruction, Research Committee. Democracy Needs Socialism. Toronto: T. Nelson, 1938.
