= Strathcona, Vancouver =

Strathcona
- Neighbourhood
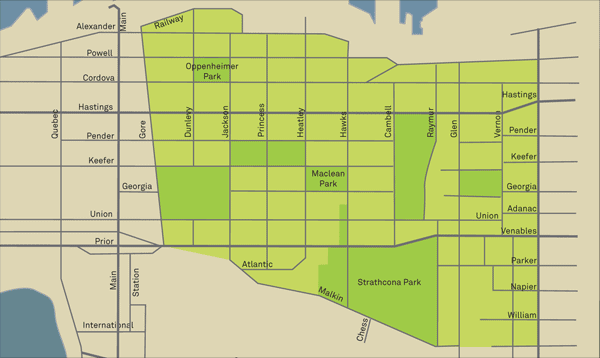
- Streetmap

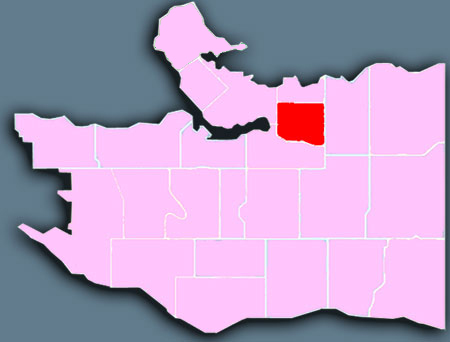
- Location within the city of Vancouver
- Coordinates: 49°16′45″N 123°5′15″W
- Regional district: Metro Vancouver
- City: Vancouver
- Named for: Donald Smith, 1st Baron Strathcona and Mount Royal

Government
  - MP: NDP Jenny Kwan (Vancouver East)
  - MLAs: NDP Joan Phillip (Vancouver-Mount Pleasant)

Area
  - Total: 3.88 km^{2} (1.50 sq mi)

Population (2016)
  - Total: 12,585
  - Density: 3,243.5/km^{2} (8,401/sq mi)

Visible minority (Note: Visible minorities are defined as "persons, other than Aboriginal peoples, who are non-Caucasian in race or non-white in colour.")
  - Chinese: 29.4%
  - Other: 16.3%
- Time zone: UTC−8 (PST)
  - Summer (DST): UTC−7 (PDT)
- Postal code: V6A
- Area codes: 604, 778
- Median income: C$12,495–13,677 (2006)
- Website: strathcona-residents.org strathconabia.com

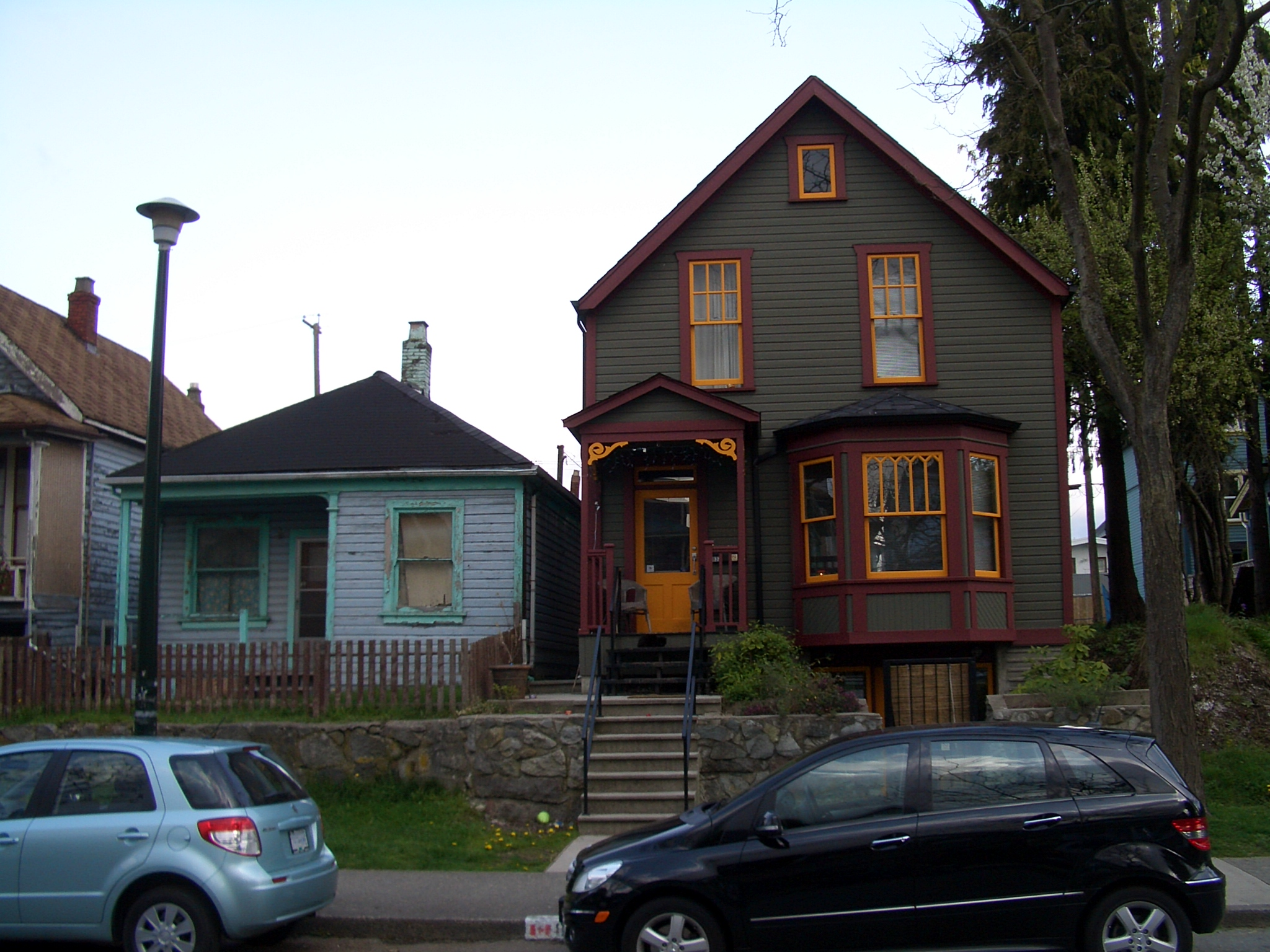
Houses renovated with the attention to the "true colours" and non-renovated, in the neighborhood

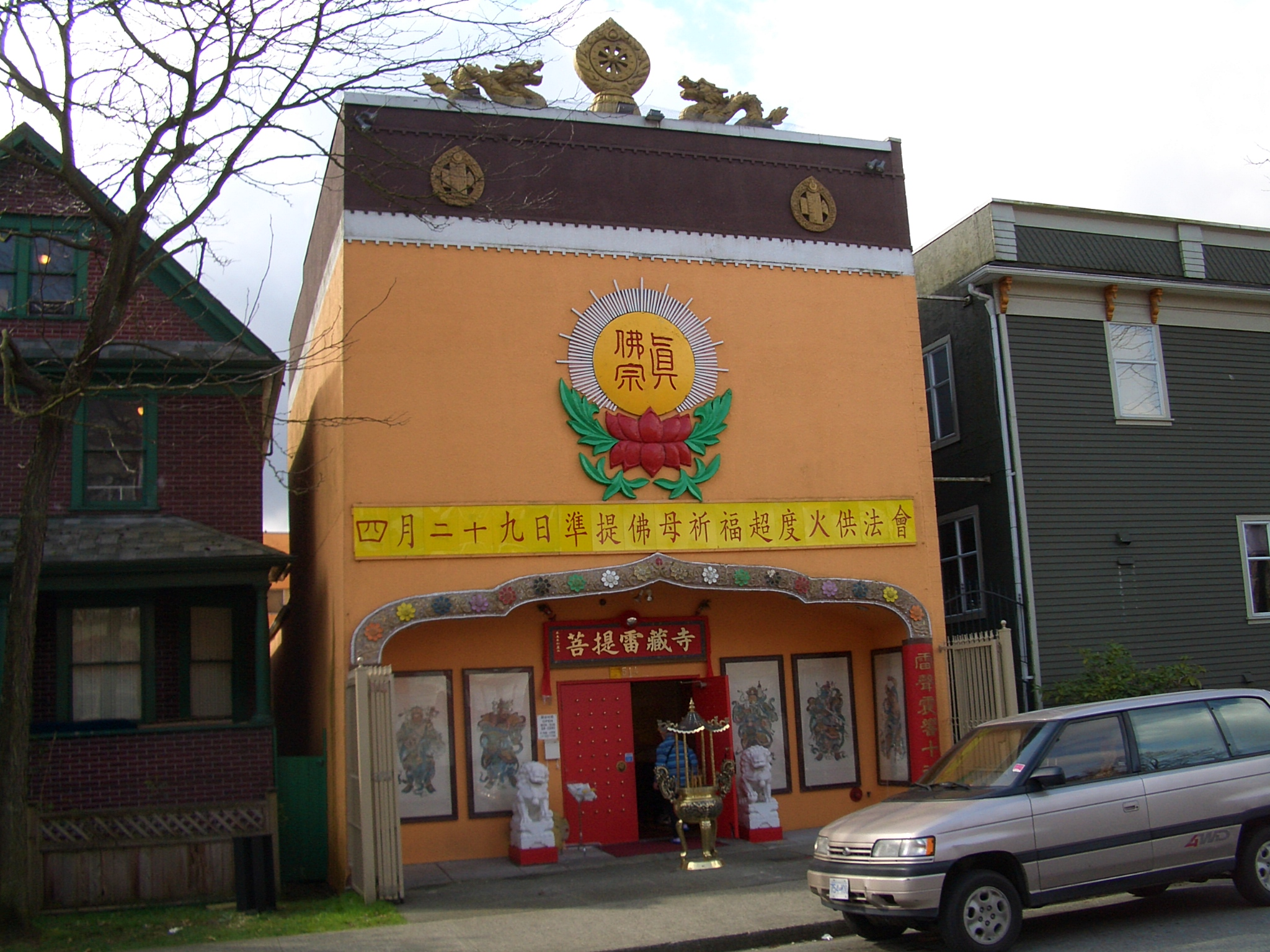
A Buddhist temple in Strathcona

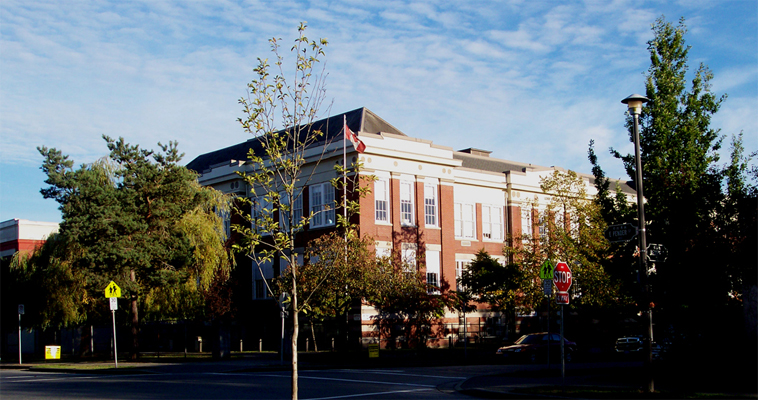
Lord Strathcona Elementary School was founded in 1891 and is the oldest school in Vancouver.

Strathcona is the oldest residential neighbourhood of Vancouver, British Columbia, Canada. Officially a part of the East Side, it is bordered by Downtown Vancouver's Chinatown neighbourhood and the False Creek inlet (across Main Street) to the west, Downtown Eastside (across Hastings Street) to the north, Grandview-Woodland (across Clark Drive) to the east, and Mount Pleasant to the south of Emily Carr University and the Canadian National Railway and Great Northern Railway (now BNSF Railway) classification yards.

By some definitions, Strathcona's northern border is the roads just south of Burrard Inlet, and much of the Downtown Eastside lies within Strathcona. By other definitions, Strathcona's northern boundary is just south of Hastings Street, and the Downtown Eastside is a separate neighbourhood to the north and northwest of Strathcona.

Strathcona has long been a hub of immigration and culture relative to Vancouver's more recently settled neighbourhoods. Chinese immigrants, Vietnamese immigrants, and various groups of European immigrants have characterized the neighbourhood's culture. Although Strathcona was historically a working-class neighbourhood, recently, more middle-class and affluent groups have come to inhabit the neighbourhood. Strathcona is home to many art galleries, family-owned corner stores, and other small businesses.

== History ==
Over 11,800 people live in Strathcona, which grew during the city's boom years between the city's founding in 1886 and 1920 due in large part to the choice of early Vancouver as a railway terminus. It emerged from the original settlement that grew around Hastings Mill. Originally called the East End, the neighbourhood adopted the name Strathcona in the 1960s. Its residents have always been from many ethnic backgrounds, and while it was historically a working-class neighbourhood, it is currently made up by a diverse range of socio-economic and cultural groups. It is the only neighbourhood where English is not the most commonly spoken language, with 61% of residents reporting Chinese as their mother tongue, followed by English at 24%.

The neighbourhood was earmarked for demolition in the 1950s as part of an urban renewal program. Strathcona would have been transformed into "block upon block of identical apartments buildings and townhouses" for social housing. The redevelopment plans proceeded with the construction of the MacLean Park housing development between Union, Keefer, Gore and Jackson, and Stamp's Place on Campbell between Hastings, Union and Raymur some 15 blocks of the neighbourhood were bulldozed including Hogan's Alley, the only Black community in Vancouver. Development was stopped due to opposition from the community, led by residents such as Bessie Lee, Mary Lee Chan, her husband Walter Chan, and daughter Shirley Chan, who banded together to form the Strathcona Property Owners and Tenants Association (SPOTA). Important municipal figures such as mayor Mike Harcourt and the TEAM and later COPE party emerged from this movement.

In 1971, residents came into conflict with the north–south rail line that had bisected the neighbourhood since 1909. Mothers of children who attended Admiral Seymour Elementary School were concerned that trains often blocked the route that their children took to walk to school. This group, which became known as the Militant Mothers of Raymur, occupied the tracks, leading to the construction of a pedestrian/cyclist overpass at Keefer St.

Just as the neighbourhood organisers were making headway at preserving the neighbourhood, city engineers proposed putting a freeway through the southern part of the neighbourhood which would have connected to a proposed waterfront route. The connectors along Gore and Carrall Streets would have partially destroyed Chinatown and Gastown.

The Mau Dan Gardens Co-operative was established in October 1981, the last of five projects initiated by the Strathcona Area Housing Society (SAHS) to provide housing for the residents of the Strathcona area whose homes were expropriated and demolished in the urban renewal clearance scheme of 1965.

In 1972, after protest by the local community, the city abandoned its plan to build a municipal fire hall on the vacant site and reserved the property known as site "C & D" for family housing. The land, owned by the City of Vancouver, is now leased to the Mau Dan Gardens Co-operative Housing Association.

The founding membership of the Co-operative was predominantly of Chinese ethnicity, but included families of Vietnamese, Cambodian, Japanese and Canadian origin.

In recent years, Strathcona has been subjected to a significant gentrification process, reinforcing the economic disparity of the area. The late 19th and early 20th century architecture in the area is a relative rarity in Vancouver and many houses in Strathcona are designated heritage houses. This housing stock in particular is being renovated, thus raising property values and attracting wealthier home owners to the area. A number of homeowners have restored their houses in the original Victorian or Edwardian styles, with a particular attention to the "true colours" of the period, which in some cases has been supported by grants from the "Restore It!" program of the Vancouver Heritage Foundation.

== Education ==
There are two public elementary schools located within Strathcona: Lord Strathcona and Admiral Seymour. Also named for Donald Smith, 1st Baron Strathcona and Mount Royal, Lord Strathcona Elementary was founded in 1891 and is the oldest school in Vancouver. The school is attached to a community centre and the school library formerly doubled as a branch of the Vancouver Public Library. Admiral Seymour Elementary was named in honour of Sir Edward Hobart Seymour, a former Admiral of the fleet of the Royal Navy. Strathcona is in the secondary school catchment area of Britannia Secondary School.

Vancouver Japanese Language School is also located in Strathcona. Established in 1906 as Vancouver Japanese Citizens School (晩香坡共立日本國民學校, Bankūbā Kyōritsu Nihon Kokumin Gakkō), it is the oldest Japanese school in Canada. Although properties owned by Japanese Canadians were forfeited by the government during World War II and were never returned, the school building on Alexander Street is the only property in Canada where half of the ownership was returned to the Japanese Canadian community after the internment. Vancouver Japanese Language School is offering Japanese immersion preschool as well as various Japanese language courses.

== Demographics ==
As of 2006, Strathcona has 11,920 people, a 3% increase from 2001. 13.5% of the population is under the age of 19; 23.5% is between 20 and 39; 38.9% is between 40 and 64; and 24.0% is 65 or older. 43.9% of Strathcona residents speak English as a first language, and 40.3% speak a Chinese language. Its unemployment rate is 4.1%.

Panethnic groups in the Strathcona neighbourhood (2001−2016)
Panethnic group	2016		2006		2001	
Panethnic group	Pop.	%	Pop.	%	Pop.	%
European (Note: Statistic includes all persons that did not make up part of a visible minority or an indigenous identity.)	4,410	44.75%	4,345	38.49%	3,865	34.96%
East Asian (Note: Statistic includes total responses of "Chinese", "Korean", and "Japanese" under visible minority section on census.)	2,995	30.39%	4,940	43.76%	5,195	46.99%
Indigenous	990	10.05%	740	6.55%	635	5.74%
Southeast Asian (Note: Statistic includes total responses of "Filipino" and "Southeast Asian" under visible minority section on census.)	595	6.04%	715	6.33%	675	6.11%
African	295	2.99%	55	0.49%	115	1.04%
Latin American	170	1.73%	110	0.97%	240	2.17%
South Asian	115	1.17%	155	1.37%	145	1.31%
Middle Eastern (Note: Statistic includes total responses of "West Asian" and "Arab" under visible minority section on census.)	75	0.76%	35	0.31%	100	0.9%
Other/Multiracial (Note: Statistic includes total responses of "Visible minority, n.i.e." and "Multiple visible minorities" under visible minority section on census.)	210	2.13%	185	1.64%	95	0.86%
Total responses	9,855	78.31%	11,290	94.71%	11,055	95.51%
Total population	12,585	100%	11,920	100%	11,575	100%
Note: Totals greater than 100% due to multiple origin responses

== See also ==
- History of Vancouver
- Downtown Eastside
