= Mount Pleasant, Vancouver =

Neighborhood of Vancouver, British Columbia, Canada

Coordinates: 49.260°N 123.108°W

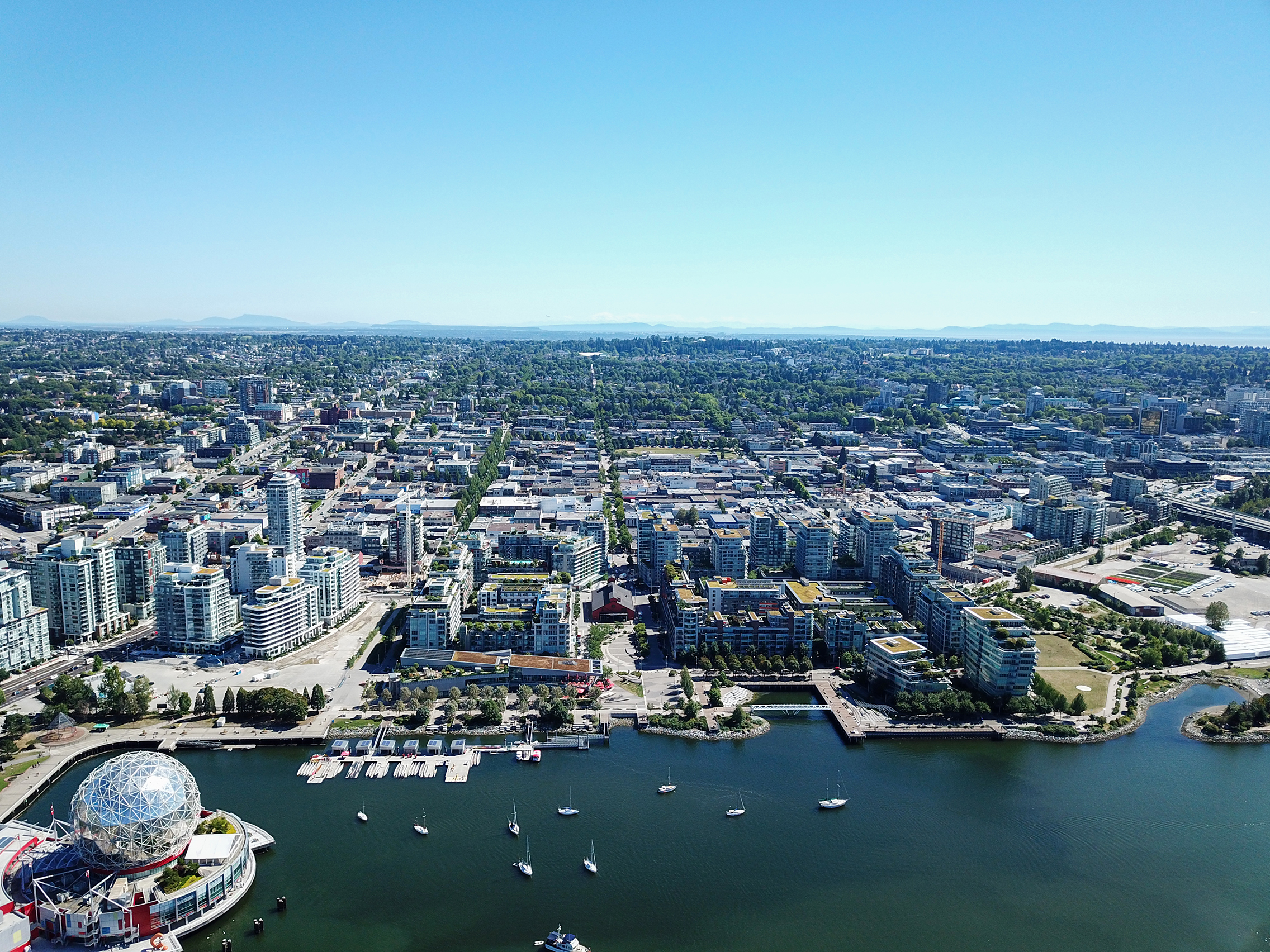
Aerial view of Mount Pleasant, Vancouver in 2018

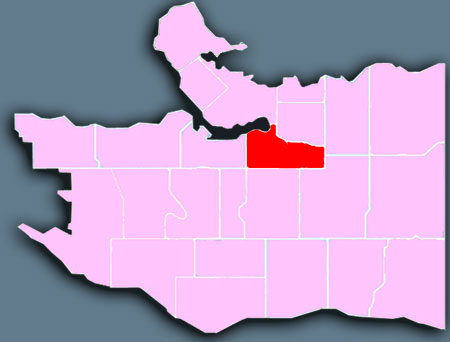
Location of the Mount Pleasant neighbourhood in Vancouver

Mount Pleasant is a neighbourhood in the city of Vancouver, British Columbia, Canada, stretching from Cambie Street to Clark Drive and from Great Northern Way and 2nd, to 16th and Kingsway. The neighbourhood, once characterized as working-class, has undergone a process of gentrification since the early 1990s, including the area around the Main Street and Broadway intersection.

The neighbourhood is served by the Canada Line, an extension of SkyTrain from Downtown Vancouver to Vancouver International Airport.

It is home to a number of artists and writers, including CBC personalities Ian Hanomansing and Tod Maffin, The Tyee editor David Beers and documentary filmmaker Peter W. Klein.

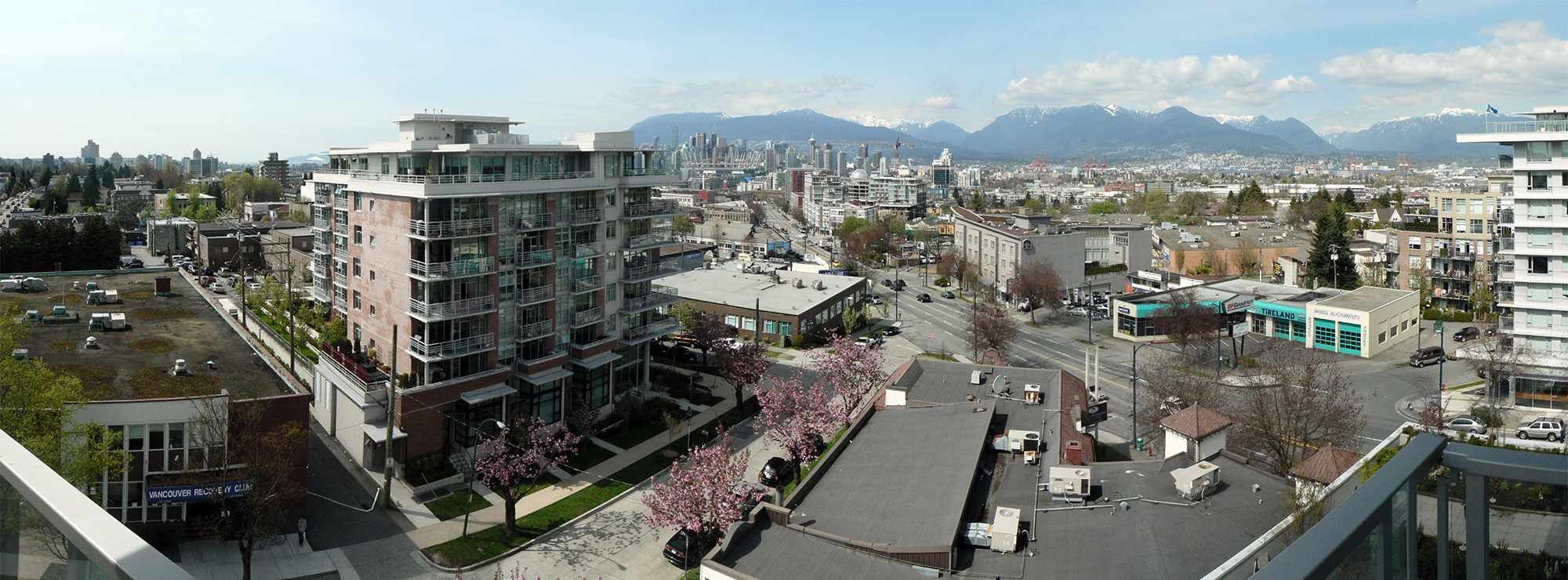
Vancouver seen from Mount Pleasant, looking north across Kingsway just before its intersection with Broadway and Main Street. Vancouver City Hall and Vancouver General Hospital are visible to the far left, Downtown Vancouver to the centre, and North Vancouver to the far right.

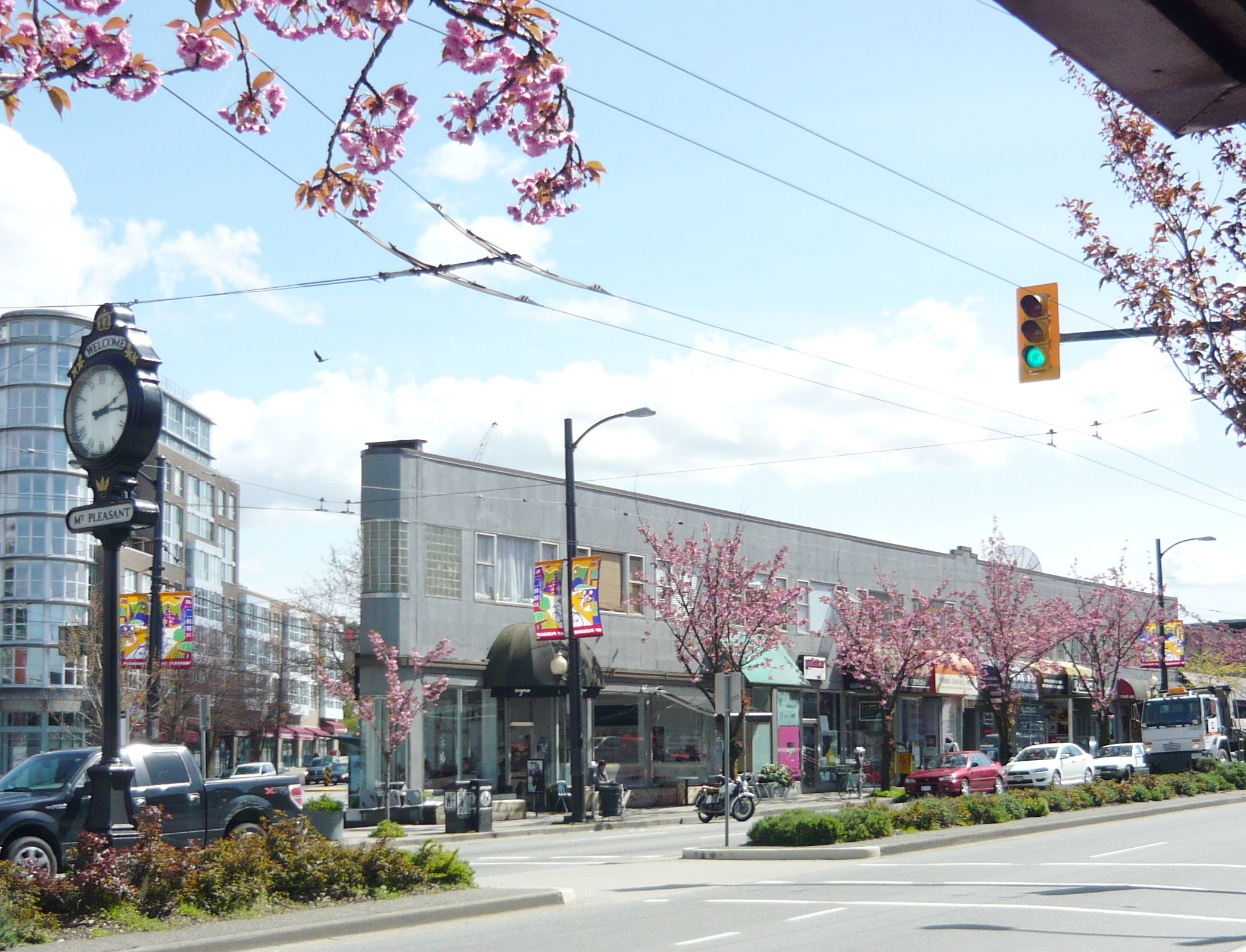
Intersection of Main Street and Kingsway

== History ==
Mount Pleasant owes much of its origins to a former stream. The stream attracted a number of breweries from 1888 to 1912, hence it became known as Brewery Creek. In 1890, the first street cars arrived; as far south as 1st and Main. Brewery Creek, in conjunction with the connecting routes of Main and Kingsway, became the centre of industry and commercialism for the district of Mt. Pleasant. By 1897, there was a substantial population growth centred on Broadway and Main Street. The ability to commute to the City Centre and the industries of Brewery Creek and False Creek provided the draw for many working families that now populated the area below Broadway. In a sense, Mount Pleasant can be called Vancouver's "first suburb".

The area high above False Creek was named "Mount Pleasant" in 1888, after the Irish birthplace of Jane Fortune Kemp the wife of Henry Valentine Edmonds. Edmonds, clerk of the municipal council in New Westminster, was the original owner of much of Mount Pleasant.

== Demographics ==
As of 2016, Mt. Pleasant has 32,955 people. 11.3% of the population is under the age of 20; 49.3% is between 20 and 39; 30.9% is between 40 and 64; and 8.6% is 65 or older. 69.9% of Mt. Pleasant residents speak English as a first language, 7.7% speak a Chinese language, and 3.0% speak Tagalog. The median household income is $66,299 and 15.7% of its population lives in low-income households. The unemployment rate is 4.7%.

Panethnic groups in the Mount Pleasant neighbourhood (2001−2016)
Panethnic group	2016		2006		2001	
Panethnic group	Pop.	%	Pop.	%	Pop.	%
European (Note: Statistic includes all persons that did not make up part of a visible minority or an indigenous identity.)	20,970	65.06%	13,510	57.98%	12,805	52.48%
East Asian (Note: Statistic includes total responses of "Chinese", "Korean", and "Japanese" under visible minority section on census.)	4,700	14.58%	3,270	14.03%	4,110	16.84%
Southeast Asian (Note: Statistic includes total responses of "Filipino" and "Southeast Asian" under visible minority section on census.)	2,675	8.3%	3,410	14.64%	4,145	16.99%
South Asian	1,075	3.34%	650	2.79%	760	3.11%
Indigenous	975	3.03%	865	3.71%	1,025	4.2%
Latin American	435	1.35%	370	1.59%	315	1.29%
African	365	1.13%	390	1.67%	615	2.52%
Middle Eastern (Note: Statistic includes total responses of "West Asian" and "Arab" under visible minority section on census.)	345	1.07%	435	1.87%	310	1.27%
Other/Multiracial (Note: Statistic includes total responses of "Visible minority, n.i.e." and "Multiple visible minorities" under visible minority section on census.)	700	2.17%	395	1.7%	300	1.23%
Total responses	32,230	97.8%	23,300	98.67%	24,400	99.45%
Total population	32,955	100%	23,615	100%	24,535	100%
Note: Totals greater than 100% due to multiple origin responses

== See also ==
- Dude Chilling Park, a public art installation in the district, in Guelph Park

== Footnotes ==
Brewery Creek Urban Study, 1985 by Barb Johnston and Denis Turco . https://web.archive.org/web/20070214021230/http://www.lesliefield.com/bchs/
