= Nora Hendrix =

African Canadian vaudeville performer

Zenora Rose "Nora" Hendrix (née Moore; November 19, 1883 – July 24, 1984) was an African-American vaudeville performer who lived in Vancouver, British Columbia, Canada. She was also the grandmother of Jimi Hendrix.

From the early to late 20th century, Hendrix was a prominent member of Vancouver's vibrant Black Strathcona community. The community thrived within the 1940s and was displaced circa 1970 by the City of Vancouver with the demolition of Hogan's Alley.

== Life in Vancouver ==
Hendrix and her husband (Bertran Philander ‘Ross’ Hendrix) moved to Vancouver, British Columbia from the United States circa 1912.

Soon after relocating, Hendrix became a prominent member of Vancouver's Black community.

In 1918, Hendrix co-founded the city's first Black-owned church (the African Methodist Episcopal Fountain Chapel) which functioned as a social and cultural hub for the growing community. Beyond religious services, the church regularly hosted meetings, bazaars, events and dinners for Strathcona's local residents. From its inception, the congregation took an active stance against anti-black racism in Vancouver – first guaranteeing the fair trial of Fred Deal (a railway porter accused of murder) in 1923, then launching an inquiry into the police killing of longshoreman Clarence Clemons in 1952.

Hendrix also worked as a cook at Vie's Chicken and Steak House – a famous black-owned late-night scene that was patronized by blue-collar workers and world-renowned entertainers alike. Like the Fountain Chapel, Vie's Chicken and Steak operated as cultural hub for the Hogan's Alley community.

Hendrix remained an active member of the community until its eventual displacement.

She remained in Vancouver until the 1980s and passed of cancer on July 24, 1984, at the age of 100.

== Artistry and performance ==
In her youth, Hendrix toured the United States as a vaudeville performer who specialized in song and dance.

She continued singing as a member of the Fountain Chapel Choir and participated in community performances within and around Vancouver.

== Commemorations ==
=== Canada Post Commemorative Stamp ===
In 2014, Canada Post commemorated Hendrix's historic role within Vancouver's Black community by issuing a special edition ‘Hogan’s Alley’ post-stamp that featured a young Nora Hendrix as one of the community's two figureheads.

=== Nora Hendrix Way ===
On February 10, 2021, Vancouver City Council unanimously approved naming a future street on the new St. Paul's Hospital campus “Nora Hendrix Way."

The name was proposed by the Civic Asset Naming Committee to honour Hendrix's role in the community and to signify the city's stated commitment to redress the historical displacement of the Black Strathcona residents.

=== Nora Hendrix Place ===
On March 3, 2019, the City of Vancouver and provincial government jointly founded a 52-unit temporary modular housing project to service of the needs of Black and Indigenous individuals experiencing homelessness in the Strathcona area. Located in the historic Hogan's Alley, the project was named in honour of Hendrix and her legacy within the Black Strathcona community.

=== Historic home ===
In 2006, the Hendrix’ original residence (827 E Georgia St.) was officially listed on the Vancouver Heritage Register. This was the address at which Hendrix raised her five children (and her late grandson, Jimi Hendrix) between 1938 and 1952.
