= Militant Mothers of Raymur =

Canadian women's activist group

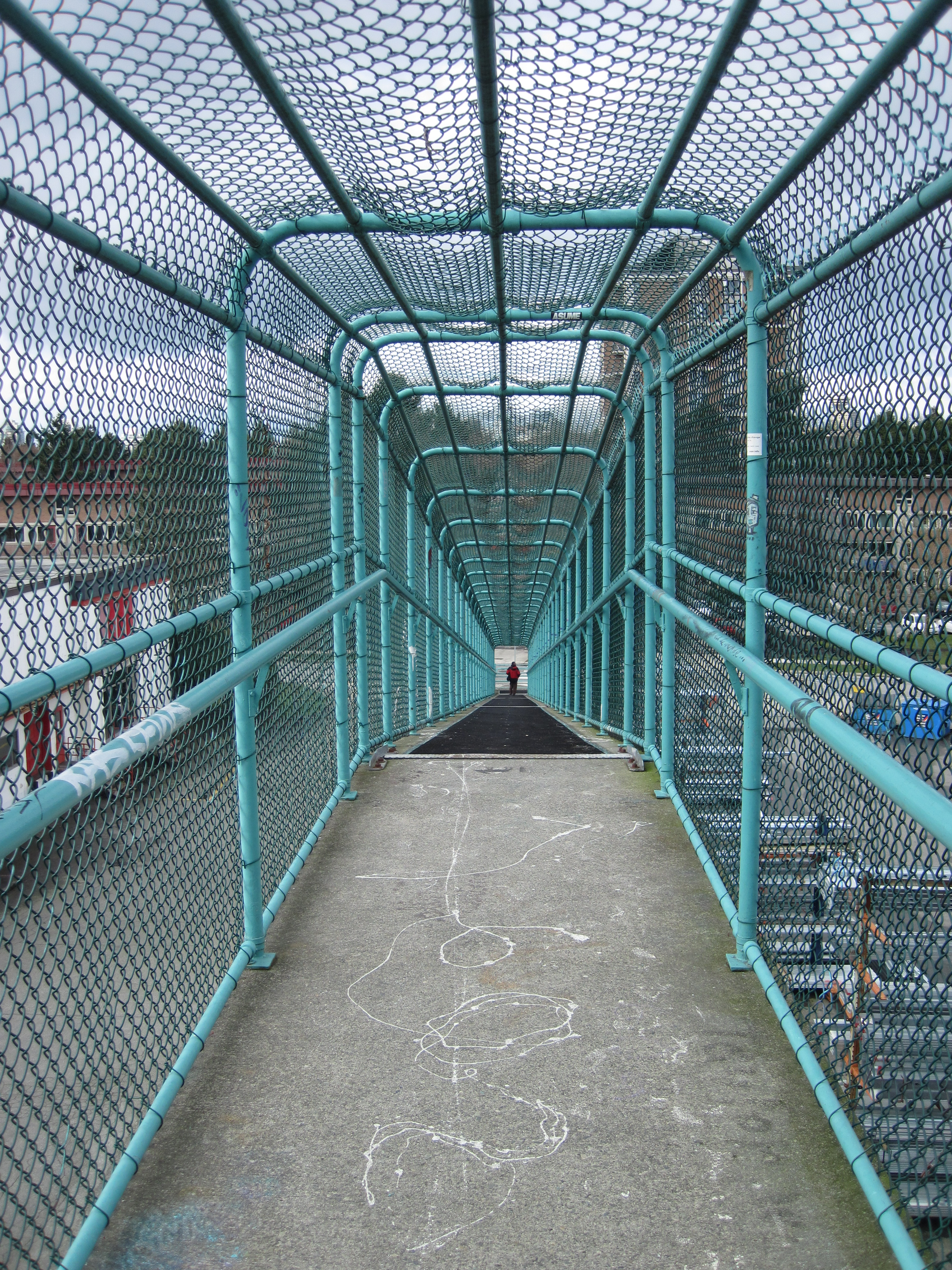
walking west inside the Militant Mothers of Raymur Overpass

The Militant Mothers of Raymur were a group of largely single mothers who coordinated a series of blockades on the railway tracks near their homes, the Ray-Mur Housing Project, starting on January 6, 1971. They were concerned for the safety of the children who needed to cross the railway tracks to attend school at nearby Admiral Seymour Elementary in the Strathcona neighbourhood of Vancouver, British Columbia, Canada.

The grass-roots group was named for the social housing project in which they resided, Ray-Mur Housing Project (now called Stamp's Place), a 250-unit building home to working-class and low-income residents and families. The children who lived in Ray-Mur were in the elementary school catchment zone of nearby Admiral Seymor Elementary and as such had to cross the busy tracks each day to and from school. The tracks ran between the Canadian National and Burlington Northern Railways' freight yards and the Burrard Inlet and were active while students were on their way to school. As a result, children often had no option but to climb between slowly moving trains or roll under parked trains in order to cross, with one boy allegedly having his feet crushed by a moving train in the late 1960s.

After months of petitioning for an overpass and a change in the trains schedules to city officials, the Canadian National Railway, and Burlington Northern Railway, the group decided to engage in civil disobedience and erect a blockade to force the organizations to take action. Following CN Rail's failure to adjust their schedules as promised, "its conductors [launch of] a not-so-silent campaign of harassment", and the City of Vancouver's inaction on the construction of an overpass, the group erected a second and larger blockade on March 24, 1971. A tent was pitched atop the tracks and several of the women stayed there for two nights and three days; the group received media attention and public opinion gradually swayed in their favour. The women argued their case at Vancouver City Hall and fought injunctions with the aid of a volunteer lawyer. Although the city then promised to build the overpass, the women continued hosting vigils on the tracks until construction began later that month. Construction was completed in time for the school year.

The women in the group included Jean Amos, Hilkka Atva, Barbara Burnet, Babs Cain, Pat Chan, Dorothy Cox, Toni Graeme, Alice Hamilton (mother of activist and political candidate Jamie Lee Hamilton), Carolyn Jerome, Siegrun Meszaros, Joan Morelli, Diana Saunders, Muggs Sigurgeirson, Vi Smith, Judith Stainsby, Helena States, Ollie Strauman, and Sheila Turgeon. Many of the women later founded a food co-op in the area and advocated for the construction of a community centre, which opened in 1976 and was named the RayCam Cooperative Centre.

The overpass was closed indefinitely in February 2026 due to structural safety concerns.

== Legacy ==
A linocut print about the group by Joyce Woods was published in the Spring 1983 (#15) issue of the Open Road newsjournal as a poster for that issue and commissioned by Bob Sarti for that issue.

Theatre in the Raw's 2014 musical, The Raymur Mothers: They Wouldn't Take No for an Answer, was based on the events. It was put on as a part of the Downtown Eastside's annual Heart of the City festival.

A mosaic on the sidewalk near the housing complex commemorates the group.

In 2019, the City of Vancouver announced that the overpass, then called the Keefer Street Pedestrian Overpass, would be officially renamed as the Militant Mothers of Raymur Overpass in honour of the women who fought for its construction.

== See also ==
- Direct action
