= Carnegie Center for Arts and History =

- Jackson Free Library
- U.S. National Register of Historic Places
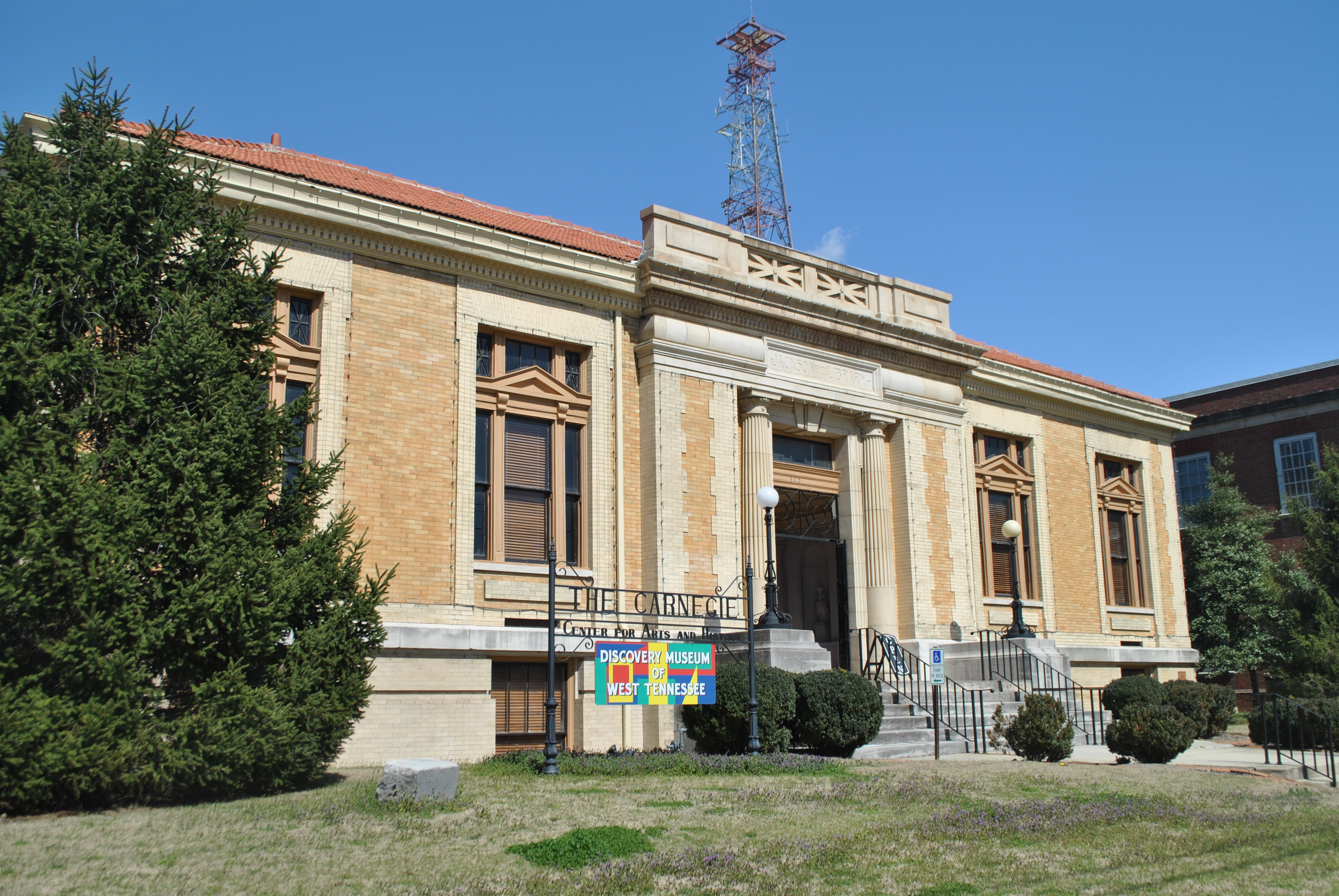

- Location within Tennessee Location within the United States
- Location: College and Church Sts., Jackson, Tennessee
- Coordinates: 35°36′58″N 88°49′1″W
- Area: 1 acre (0.40 ha)
- Built: 1901
- Architectural style: Renaissance, Italian Renaissance
- NRHP reference No.: 75001769
- Added to NRHP: June 26, 1975

The Carnegie Center for Arts and History is a museum and events venue in downtown Jackson, Tennessee, housed in the former Jackson Free Library.

The Jackson Free Library, which opened in 1903, was the first public library in Jackson. Part of the funding for its construction came from philanthropist Andrew Carnegie. After the Jackson-Madison County Library was built to replace it, the Free Library underwent a period of deterioration that ended in 1987 when the city undertook to restore it. It was listed on the National Register of Historic Places in 1975.

The facility is now a community museum, featuring rotating art and history exhibits. The Carnegie also hosts the Legends of Tennessee Music collection, including artifacts from Carl Perkins, Eddy Arnold, and Sonny Boy Williamson.

The museum was also formerly known as the Discovery Museum of West Tennessee.
