= Transportation in Vancouver =

TransLink major route map (2016)

Transportation in Vancouver, British Columbia, has many of the features of modern cities worldwide. Unlike many large metropolises, Vancouver has no freeways into or through the downtown area. A proposed freeway through the downtown was rejected in the 1960s by a coalition of citizens, community leaders and planners. This event "signalled the emergence of a new concept of the urban landscape" and has been a consistent element of the city's planning ever since.

As the city is surrounded by water on three sides, it has several bridges to the north and south. Although similar to most other cities in that the automobile serves as the primary mode of transport, it has alternatives such as the SkyTrain system, which is the longest fully automated light metro system in the world, and an extensive network of bicycle paths.

Until 2020, Vancouver was one of only a few major cities in North America without ridesharing company services, due to a provincial law banning their operation. Legislation was amended to allow such services in 2018. The first ridesharing companies, Uber and Lyft, were approved and began operating in the region in January 2020.

== Public transport ==
The Metro Vancouver Regional District operates a regional rapid mass transit network, under the auspices of the South Coast British Columbia Transportation Authority (formerly Greater Vancouver Transportation Authority). Known as TransLink, it is responsible for all aspects of municipal transport. In addition to public transit, TransLink is also responsible for maintaining some roads and providing ferry service within the Lower Mainland.

TransLink introduced a smart card based electronic payment system called Compass Card to replace existing monthly and daily passes, tickets and cash. TransLink has been slowly phasing in use of the Compass Card. Summer 2015 saw most post-secondary school students begin using the fare cards. TransLink rolled out the card to the general population in November 2015. The Compass Card has a [C$]6 refundable deposit. It is a NXP Mifare DESFire EV1 card.

=== Bus service ===
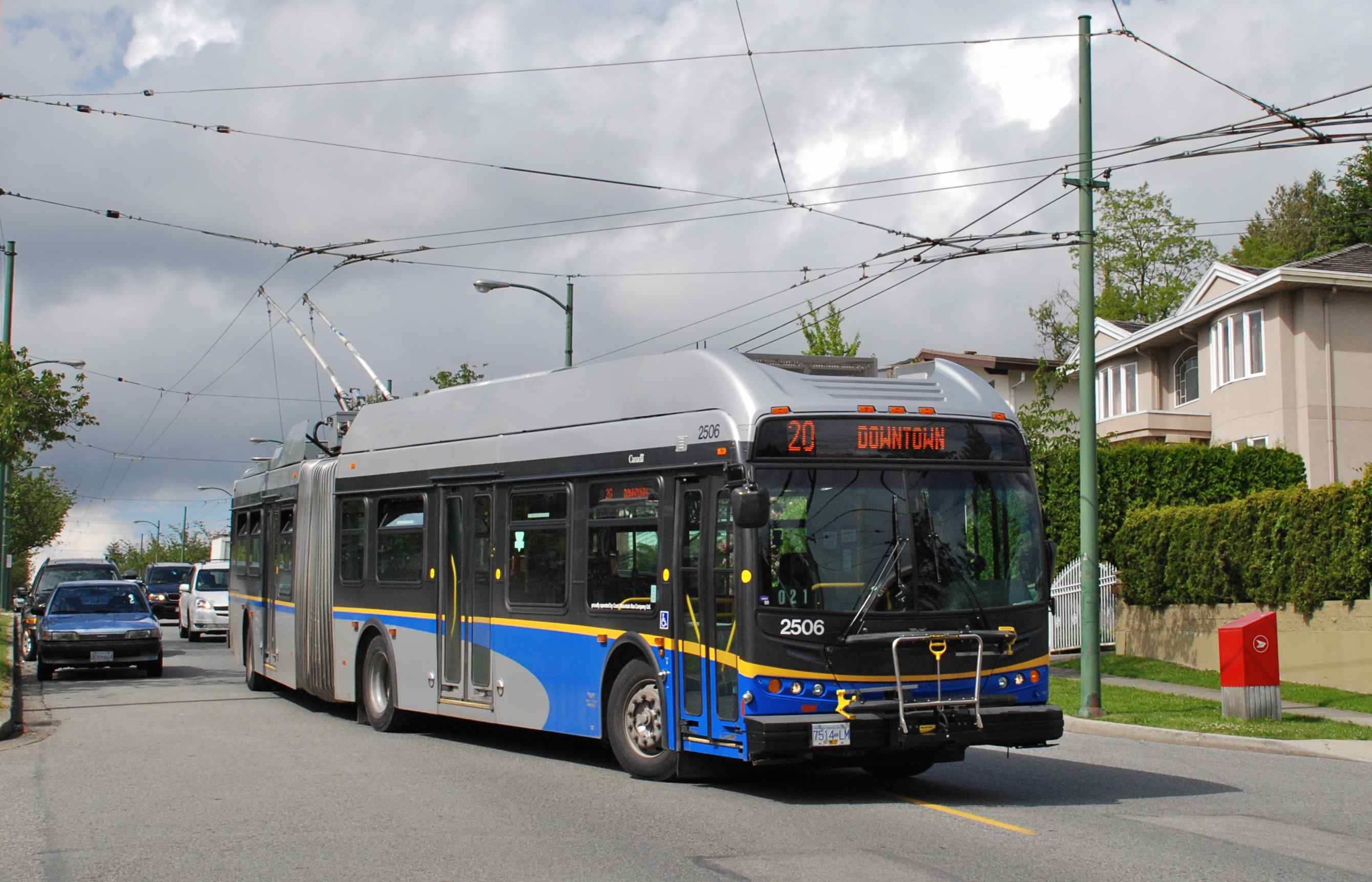
A TransLink-operated electric trolley bus in Vancouver

Bus service operates throughout most of the region under a subsidiary of TransLink, known as Coast Mountain Bus Company. TransLink was established by the provincial government as a way to divorce itself from the responsibilities of roads, bridges and transit service. Ultimately the provincial government retains responsibility for funding of all projects under the aegis of TransLink. Service in West Vancouver and Lions Bay is contracted through West Vancouver Blue Bus.

All buses are wheelchair-accessible and carry cycle racks; they can carry two wheelchairs and bicycles. Vancouver is actively maintaining and upgrading its trolleybus fleet. With purchases of 188 E40LFRs and 74 E60LFRs from New Flyer Industries (in 2005–2009), the trolley network serves the downtown core and much of the city of Vancouver proper with fully wheelchair-accessible and bicycle-friendly zero-emission buses.

Certain diesel commuter buses which travel to the suburbs as RapidBus have bicycle racks, wheelchair lifts, reading lights and high back reclining seats. Frequency in Greater Vancouver ranges from every couple of minutes within downtown Vancouver to two to three trips a day in far-flung suburbs such as Maple Ridge, Langley, and Aldergrove.

=== SkyTrain ===
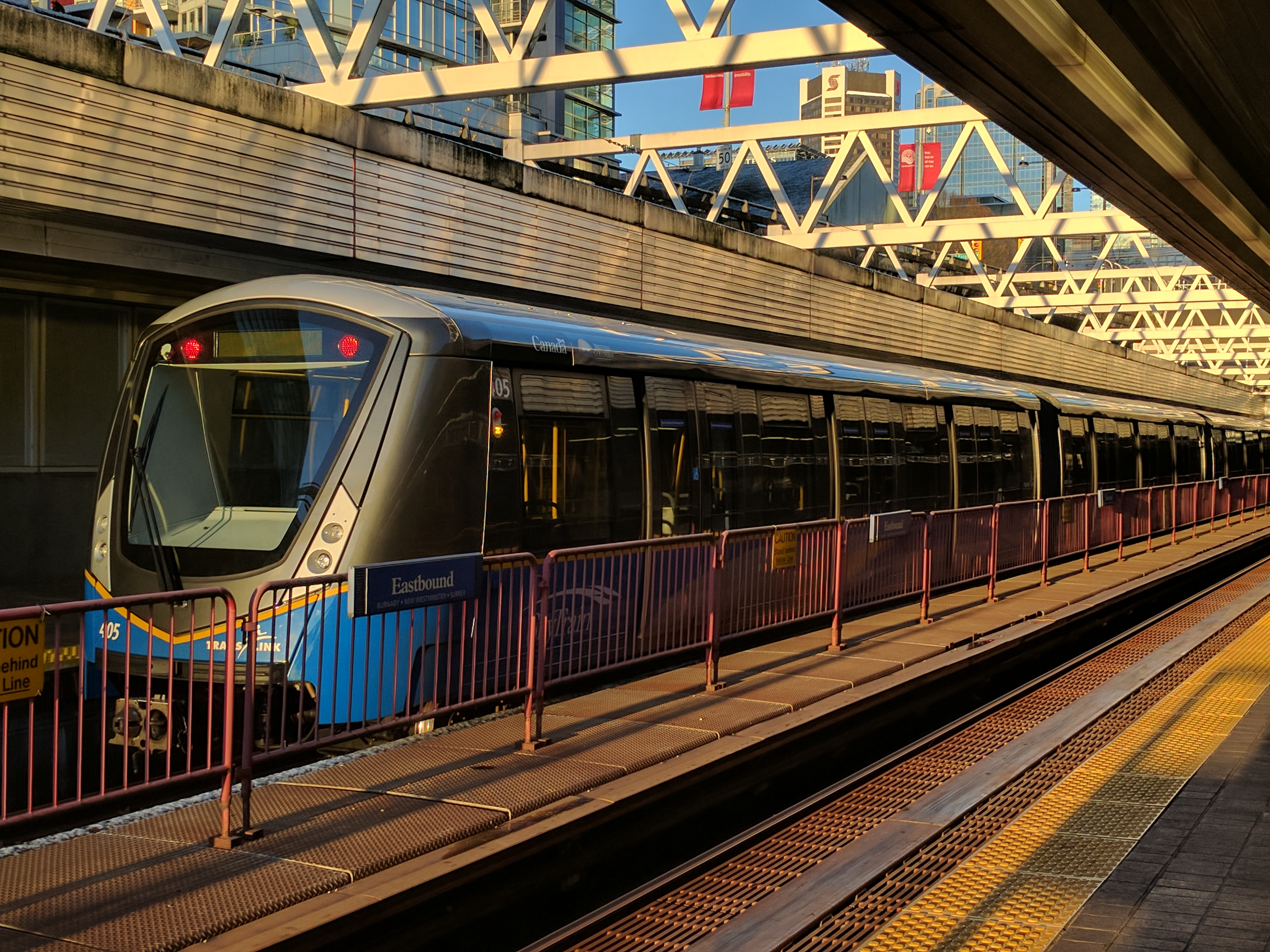
SkyTrain's Bombardier ART Mk III at Stadium–Chinatown station

The SkyTrain is an advanced rapid metro system operating fully automated trains on three lines. Built for the Expo 86 world's fair, it has since become the world's second longest automated light rapid transit system using the world's longest transit-only bridge, the SkyBridge. The Expo Line and Millennium Line link downtown to the suburbs of Burnaby, New Westminster, Surrey, and Coquitlam.

A third rapid transit line connecting downtown Vancouver to central Richmond and the Vancouver International Airport, known as the Canada Line, started operation on August 17, 2009. It uses Hyundai Rotem rolling stock instead of the Innovia linear induction technology used on the first two lines.

==== Future expansion ====
Plans from the 2000s to expand the Expo Line to the southeast, increasing its capacity and extending its route further into the city of Surrey, were superseded in the mid-2010s by a proposed light rail line. These plans were themselves superseded in 2018 in favour of a return to the planned SkyTrain extension.

As of 2021, construction is underway for a $2-billion extension of the Millennium Line west towards Kitsilano and Point Grey. The phase 1 extension would start at the current VCC–Clark SkyTrain station terminus, then run under the Broadway corridor to terminate at a station at Arbutus Street; it is expected to be completed in 2025. At a future date, a phase 2 extension would be built to the University of British Columbia.

In 2022, funding for a 16-kilometre (9.9 mi) extension of the Expo Line southeast through Surrey into Langley was formally approved by the provincial and federal governments. Major construction is expected to proceed from 2024 until the line opens in 2028.

In early 2022, TransLink and the Mayors' Council approved the 10-year priority projects of the Transport 2050 plan through to the early 2030s. These projects includes several rapid bus transit lines and the extension of the SkyTrain system.

=== Downtown streetcar ===
The city was planning the first phase of a downtown streetcar from Granville Island around False Creek to Waterfront Station and then to Stanley Park using a combination of modern low-floor trams and heritage streetcars. The Vancouver Downtown Historic Railway was running the phase-zero route, Granville Island-Main Street SkyTrain station, in the summer months, as a demonstration.

From January 21 to March 21, 2010, a free demonstration service called the Olympic Line (named after the 2010 Winter Olympics) ran along 1.8 km of the Downtown Historic Railway, from Granville Island to Olympic Village Station, using two Bombardier Flexity Outlook streetcars borrowed from the Brussels tramway.

Plans were being developed that would have extended the streetcar network into Yaletown making a ring around the downtown peninsula as phase two. Longer range plans were being discussed that may have extended the streetcar from Granville Island west onto the Arbutus corridor, east along Hastings Street and/or south along Main Street. However, there are no current plans for a streetcar network in Vancouver, and the Olympic Line demonstration line was decommissioned.

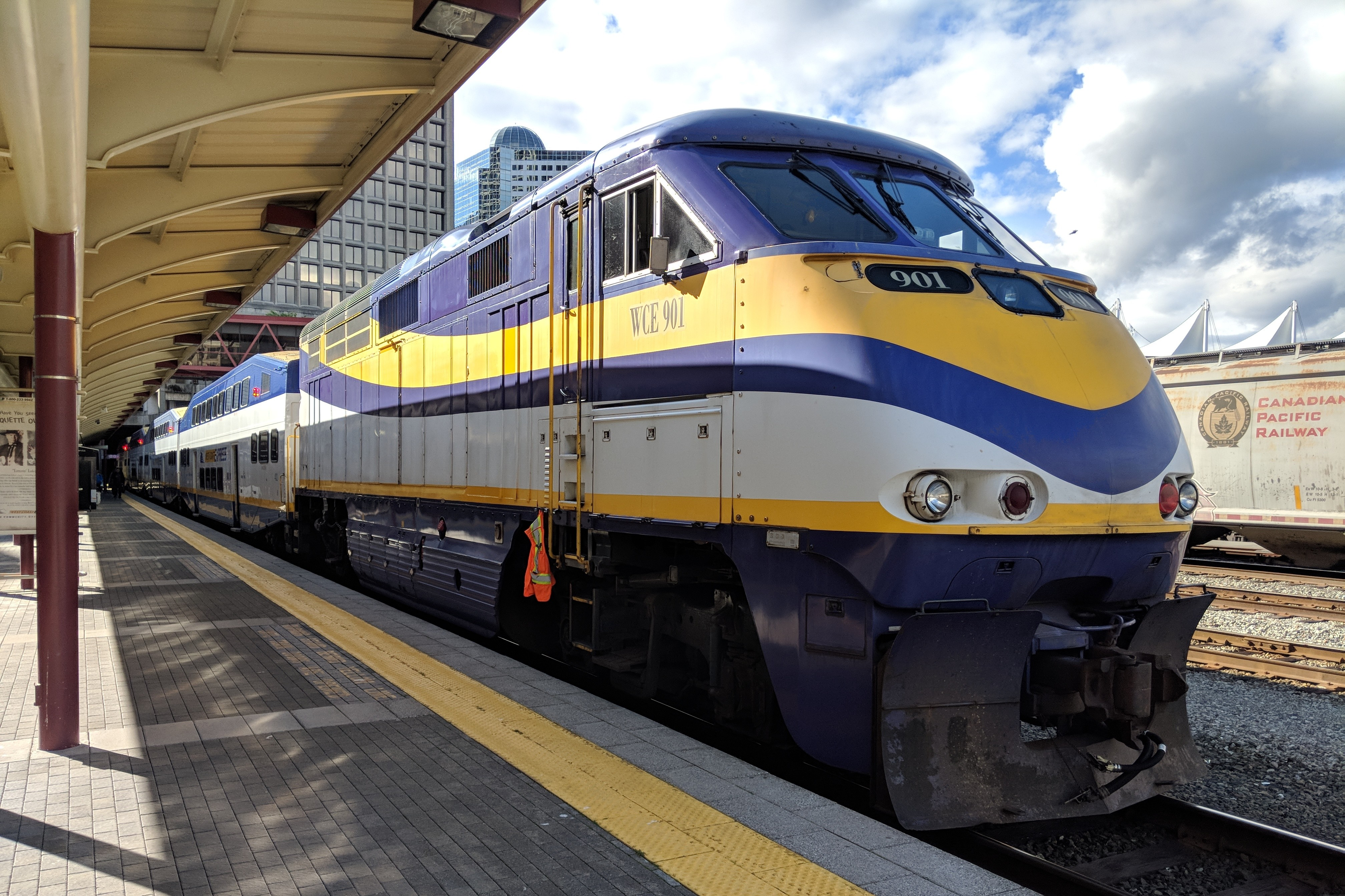
TransLink operates a commuter railway, the West Coast Express.

=== West Coast Express ===
The West Coast Express, a heavy commuter rail train, serves Port Moody, Coquitlam, Port Coquitlam, Pitt Meadows, Maple Ridge, and Mission. These services have an integrated ticketing system.

=== SeaBus ===
The SeaBus is a passenger-only ferry connecting downtown Vancouver and the City of North Vancouver across Burrard Inlet. There are three ferries in the fleet, which is owned and operated by the Coast Mountain Bus Company. The newest vessel was put into service in 2014.

== Cycling ==
Canadian census data shows that cycling mode share for the city is 3.7 percent as compared to 1.7 percent for the Metro Vancouver area. In neighbourhoods such as Point Grey, Kitsilano, Mount Pleasant and Grandview Woodlands the cycling mode share can be over 10 percent. Within the downtown core, the combined walking and cycling mode is as high as 50 percent.

=== Cycling infrastructure ===
Vancouver is served by a network of over 300 lane-km of on- and off-road bicycle routes. Most of these routes are local street bikeways (also known as bike boulevards), streets that have extensive traffic calming measures such as traffic circles, and signal control to facilitate crossing of major roads. Neighbourhoods are encouraged to plant and care for the circles and boulevards and add public art along bike routes.

Map of bike lanes in Downtown Vancouver and the surrounding area

Since 2004, with the implementation of the Downtown Transportation Plan the City has been adding more bicycle lanes on roads in the densely populated downtown core, signalling its desire to encourage greater commuter use of bicycles. A lack of separated facilities in the downtown core and poor bridge crossings remain as an obstacle to provide facilities that serve the needs of novice and advanced cyclists. The City of Vancouver is continuing to provide additional racks and other types of bike parking.

The Central Valley Greenway, a 25-kilometre (16 mi) green bicycle corridor, was officially opened on June 27, 2009. This route forms a regional connection linking downtown Vancouver to Burnaby and New Westminster. Within the City of Vancouver, the Central Valley Greenway is almost entirely separated from traffic; counts completed by the City of Vancouver show that almost 2,000 cyclists per day were using this route within one month of the opening.

On May 7, 2009, Vancouver City Council approved a bicycle lane trial on the Burrard Bridge which began on July 13. It saw the southbound motor-vehicle curb lane and the northbound-side sidewalk allocated to bicycles, with the southbound-side sidewalk allocated to pedestrians. The reassigned lane was separated from motor vehicles by a physical barrier. As part of the trial, traffic pattern changes to accommodate feeder bicycle traffic were also completed on Pacific St. next to the North bridgehead over complaints from local merchants that cited lack of consultation and a negative impact on their businesses. Two weeks into the trial, the City of Vancouver released a data report showing daily bicycle travel across the bridge had increased by an average of 30 percent. The same report indicated little change in pedestrian trips, a slight drop in motor vehicle trips, but no change in motor vehicle travel times between 12th Avenue and Georgia Street along Burrard via the bridge.

Proposed cycling infrastructure upgrades have often been met with concerns about impacts to the business community. Three days into the Burrard Bridge Bike Lane trial, a local merchant reported a 46 percent drop in sales compared to the same days the year before. Six weeks into the trial another local merchant reported a 25 percent drop in sales, and a local restaurant reported a 30 percent drop in sales. In July 2011 Stantec was commissioned by the city to survey businesses in areas around recently installed downtown bike lanes in order to prepare a report summarizing impacts to businesses of the bike lanes; 32 percent of business responded to the survey. The study concluded that there was a total loss of $2.4 million in sales for nearby businesses amounting to $480,000 in lost profits a year, which was categorized as "moderate economic impacts." However, in 2017, the upgrades were welcomed by the Downtown Vancouver Business Improvement Association as a "competitive edge" for local employers.

TransLink, the regional transportation authority, permits two bicycles aboard each SkyTrain car at all times except in the peak direction at morning and afternoon rush periods. The Canada Line Skytrain permits one bicycle per car with no limitations on time of day or direction. All buses are equipped with bicycle racks. The Seabus, which connects Vancouver to North Vancouver, allows up to six bicycles per sailing during all hours of operation.

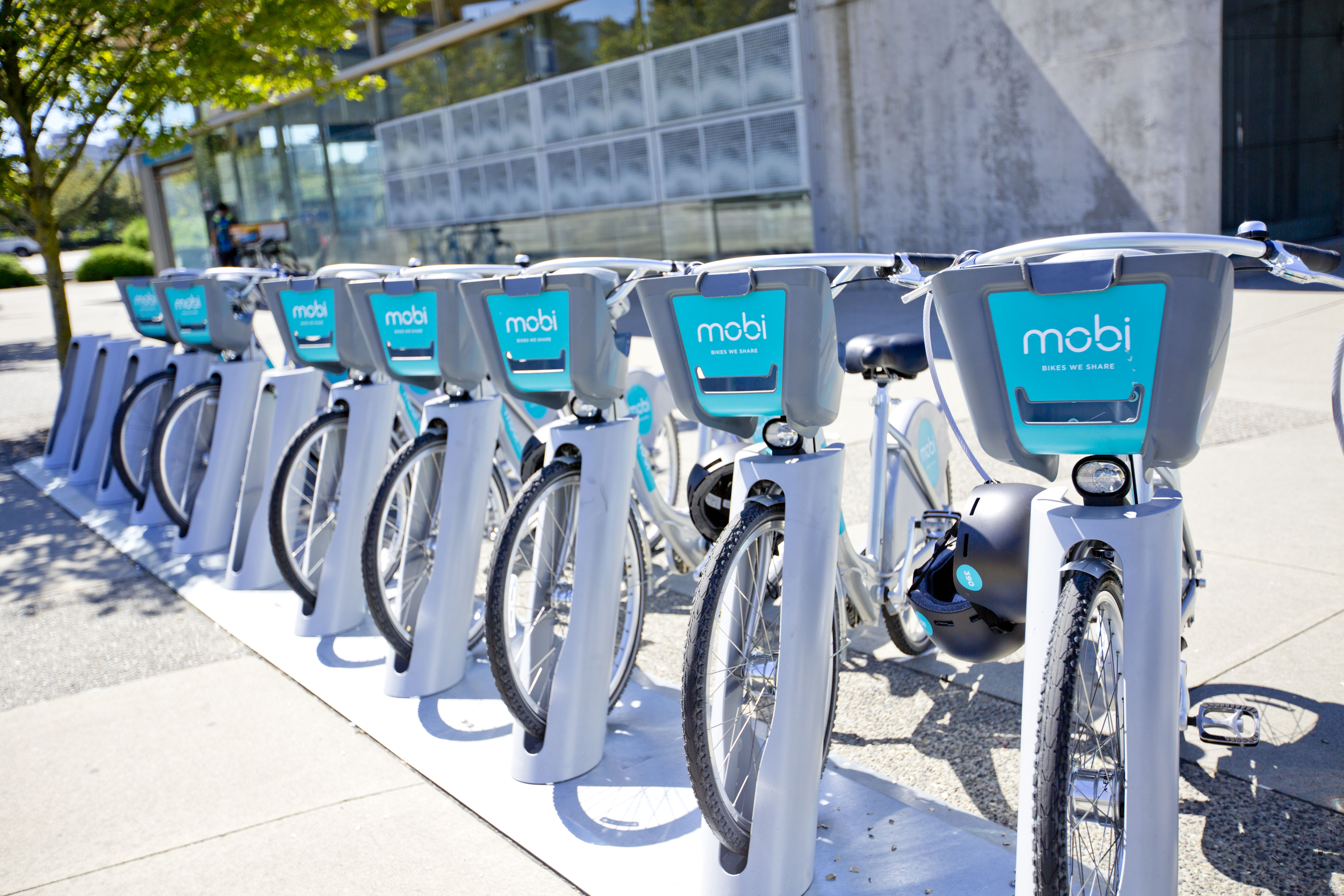
The city has administered the Mobi bike sharing program since 2016.

=== Bike share ===
On July 20, 2016, a bicycle sharing system known as Mobi launched in the City of Vancouver. In September 2018, Uber announced plans to launch its dockless electric bicycle sharing system, Jump Bikes in Vancouver.

=== Bicycle theft ===
On August 24, 2009, the Vancouver Police Department announced a sharp increase in bicycle theft, with the first 3 weeks of August experiencing a 53 percent increase in thefts over 2008. Constable Jana McGuinness, Vancouver Police spokeswoman was quoted as saying, "there is no link between the increase in bike thefts and the recent dedicated bike lanes on Burrard Bridge."

== Freeways ==
Map of provincial highways and freeways in Metro Vancouver

Municipal bylaws and geography have protected Vancouver from the spread of urban freeways, and the only freeway within city limits is Highway 1, which passes through the eastern edge of the city. All other limited-access routes entering the city (Highway 99, Knight Street, Grant McConachie Way), cease being freeways before they enter Vancouver's city limits. From Highway 1, Hastings Street is the primary route to Downtown. Other freeways in the region include Highways 1A, 7, 10, 15, 17, and 91.

The lack of freeways in the City of Vancouver is primarily due to the protests of concerned citizens as the city was being developed. During the late 1950s, proposals were made by the City to put a freeway through the heart of Chinatown. The Chinese community joined together with non-Chinese supporters to prevent the freeway from being implemented, and by 1971 Chinatown was declared a historical area. The only sections built were the Dunsmuir and Georgia viaducts, which became low-speed streets.

== Car sharing ==
There are two car sharing companies that operate in Vancouver: Modo and Evo. There were previously four car sharing companies, but in 2020, Car2go left Vancouver after nearly ten years as it restructured and pulled out of the North American market, and Zipcar left the city after nearly 13 years, citing issues with provincial insurance.

Modo and Evo are Canadian car sharing services that operate different models. Modo is a cooperative and its cars have dedicated parking spots, whether on street or in parking lots. Their vehicles must be returned to the dedicated parking spot they were originally picked up from. Evo was created by the British Columbia Automobile Association, and its cars can be parked nearly anywhere and can be booked for one-way travel and left in a legal parking spot within the vehicle's zone's geographic boundary.

== Airport ==
Vancouver is served by Vancouver International Airport (YVR), located on Sea Island in the City of Richmond, immediately south of Vancouver. YVR is the second busiest airport in Canada and one of the busiest international airports on the west coast of North America.

Vancouver Harbour Water Aerodrome on Burrard Inlet and a heliport near Waterfront Station link downtown directly to Victoria, Nanaimo and YVR.

Metro Vancouver also has a few minor airports and airfields with no scheduled flights, including Boundary Bay Airport, Delta/Delta Heritage Air Park, Fort Langley Airport, Langley Regional Airport, Pitt Meadows Airport, & Surrey/King George Airpark.

== Rail ==
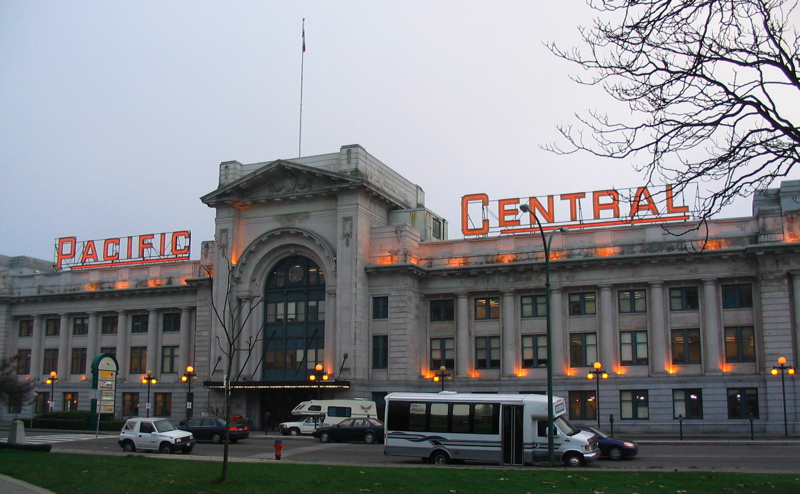
Pacific Central Station is the western terminus for several Via Rail inter-city routes.

Rail service is operated from the following stations:

- Waterfront station – Regional rail service operated by West Coast Express to Mission.
- Pacific Central Station – Inter-city passenger rail service is operated by Via Rail to the interior and Eastern Canada, Toronto, and intermediate points aboard The Canadian. Inter-city passenger rail service operated by Amtrak Cascades to Seattle, Washington and Portland, Oregon.
- Rocky Mountaineer Station – Tour passenger train services operated by the Rocky Mountaineer to the interior, Rocky Mountains en route to Banff and Jasper.

== Ferries ==
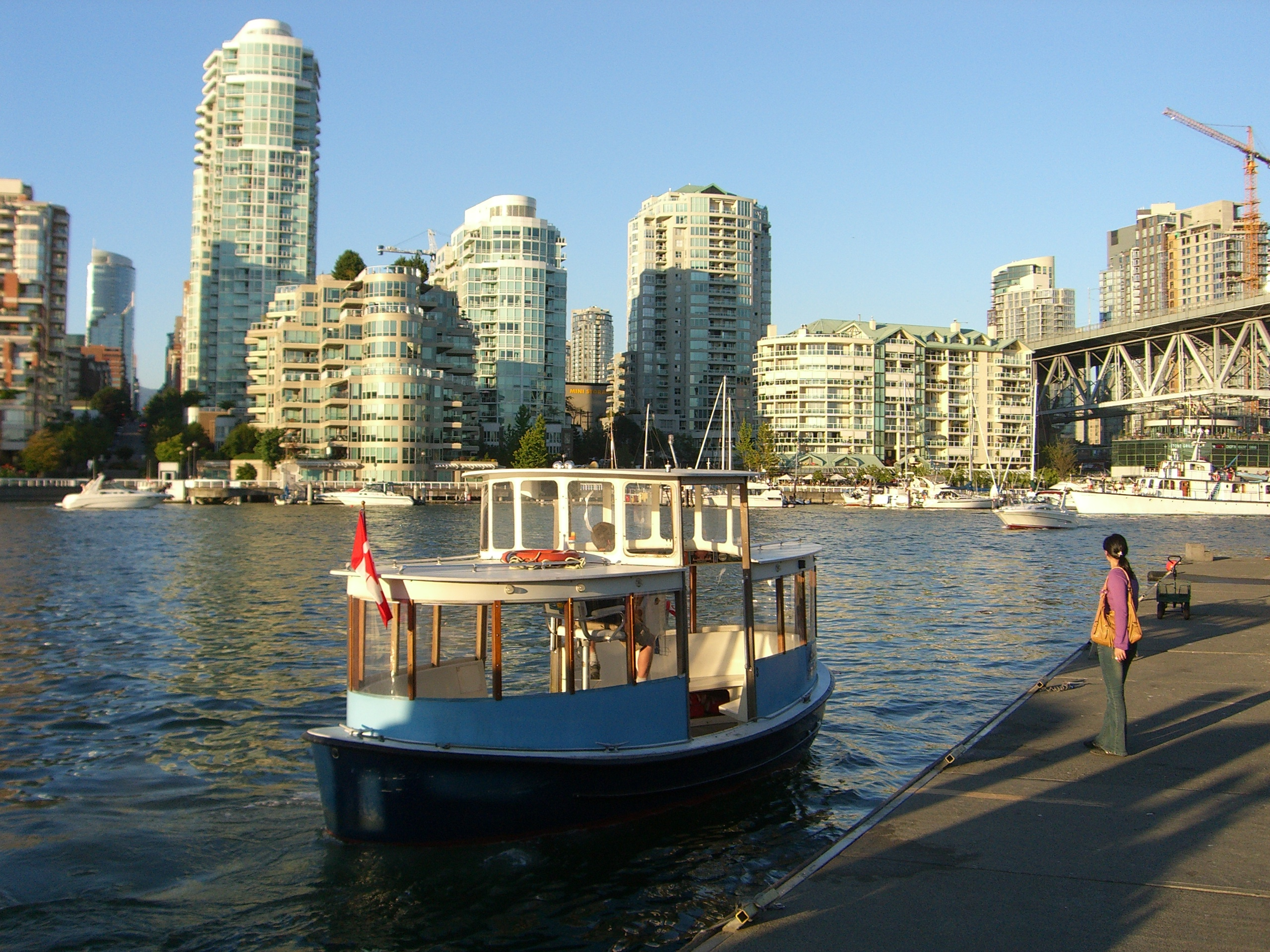
False Creek Ferry is a private company that operates a passenger and bicycle ferry service around Downtown Vancouver.

=== Large ferries ===
Three BC Ferries terminals serve the Metro Vancouver area. Two are major terminals: one is to the northwest, at Horseshoe Bay in West Vancouver, and the other is to the south, at Tsawwassen in Delta. The third one is at Snug Cove on Bowen Island, which is a minor facility and is only served by a route between it and Horseshoe Bay. Routes link the mainland to Vancouver Island, the Sunshine Coast, and the Gulf Islands from the two major terminals.

Several passenger-only ferries have operated from Vancouver to destinations on Vancouver Island, mainly run by private companies. V2V Vacations launched a service from Vancouver to Victoria in 2017 and operated it until shutting down in 2020. A service connecting Vancouver to Nanaimo, named Hullo, began operating on August 16, 2023.

=== Mini-ferries ===
The Aquabus and False Creek Ferries are private companies that operate passenger and bicycle ferries connecting the downtown peninsula with Granville Island and the False Creek neighbourhoods. English Bay Launch operates daily scheduled foot-passenger water taxi service between Granville Island, Coal Harbour and Bowen Island. Coastal Link Ferries operates daily scheduled foot-passenger water taxi service between Coal Harbour, West Vancouver, and Bowen Island. The City of New Westminster also operates a passenger commuter ferry, the Q to Q Ferry, crossing the north arm of the Fraser River between New Westminster Quay and Queensborough a neighbourhood of New Westminster.

=== Inland ferry ===
The Ministry of Transportation and Transit operates the Barnston Island Ferry between Port Kells, Surrey and Barnston Island. It is one of the 14 free inland ferries in British Columbia.

== Taxis ==
Several private taxicab companies operate 24-hour service in Vancouver, including Yellow Cabs, Vancouver Taxi, Black Top Cabs, and MacLure's Cabs. Taxis and drivers are regulated by the city and, as of 2006, 477 licensed cabs operated in the city, including 59 wheelchair-accessible vehicles. As of 2009, a taxi ride to or from Vancouver International Airport costs approximately $30–$32. Cabs in Vancouver are powered by gasoline, natural gas, and electricity. There is also a pedicab company operating in downtown Vancouver called Tikki Tikki pedicabs, usually operating on Thursday, Friday and Saturday nights.

== Major streets ==
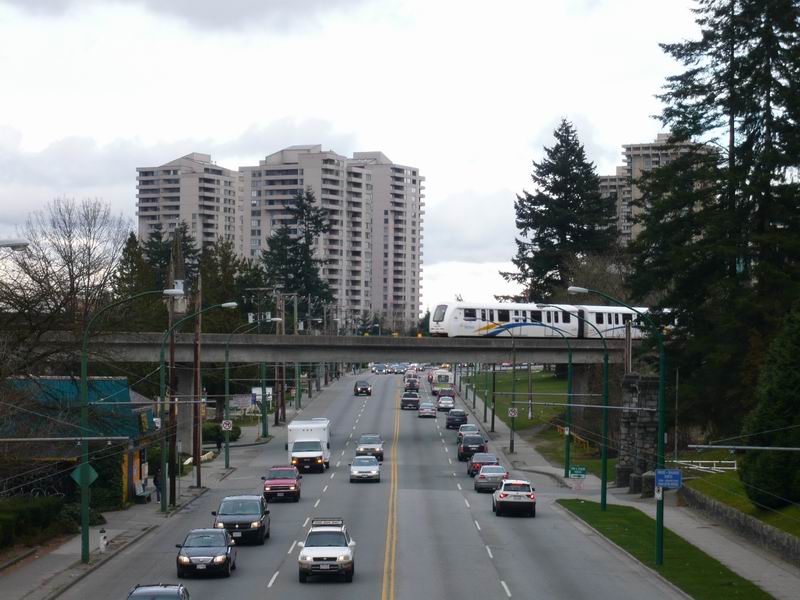
Kingsway is a major thoroughfare in Vancouver. It runs diagonally from northwest to southeast.

- Boundary Road
- Broadway
- Burrard Street
- Cambie Street
- Commercial Drive
- Davie Street
- Hastings Street
- Howe Street
- King Edward Avenue
- Kingsway
- Knight Street
- Georgia Street
- Main Street
- McGill Street
- Granville Street
- Oak Street
- Robson Street

== See also ==
- Plug-in electric vehicles in British Columbia § Vancouver
