= Granville Island Water Taxi Services =

Former transport service in Vancouver, Canada

Granville Island Water Taxi Services was a privately owned and operated water taxi service in the Lower Mainland, British Columbia, Canada, which was replaced by English Bay Launch in 2009. It was one of three water taxi services connecting Bowen Island to Vancouver with regularly scheduled service.

Granville Island Water Taxi Services operated enclosed vessels that could transport up to twelve passengers, who were allowed to bring bicycles on board.

== Stops ==
Regularly scheduled routes operated between stops at the following locations:

- Granville Island
- Coal Harbour
- Snug Cove

== See also ==
- Aquabus
- False Creek Ferries
