= Henry Barnes (traffic engineer) =

American traffic engineer (1906–1968)

Henry A. Barnes
- Born: December 16, 1906
- Died: September 16, 1968 (aged 61)
- Resting place: Forestville Cemetery
- Spouse: Hazel M. Barnes
- Engineering career
- Discipline: Traffic Engineer

Henry A. Barnes (December 16, 1906 – September 16, 1968) was an American traffic engineer and commissioner who served in many cities, including Flint, Michigan; Denver, Colorado; Baltimore, Maryland; and New York City. Barnes was responsible for many innovations in traffic engineering, including synchronized traffic signals, actuated traffic signals (signals whose timing varies based on the presence of automobiles and pedestrians), and bus lanes.

== Barnes Dance ==
In traffic signal operation, a Barnes Dance or Barnes Shuffle is a period during which all motor vehicle traffic is stopped and pedestrians given exclusive right of way, allowing them to cross in every direction at the same time. It was first used in Kansas City and Vancouver in the late 1940s and subsequently adopted in other cities such as Denver, New York, San Diego, Baltimore, and Washington, D.C. Barnes stated that he did not invent the concept but promoted its widespread use. The phrase originated from City Hall reporter, John Buchanan, who wrote, "Barnes has made people so happy, they're dancing in the street."

== Traffic Engineer and Commissioner ==
=== Flint, Michigan ===
Barnes served in Flint until 1947.

=== Denver ===
Denver city's first professional traffic engineer from 1947 to 1953, where he oversaw the conversion of Denver Tramways to bus and trolley coach.

=== Baltimore ===
Barnes came to Baltimore in 1953 for a one-month job as consultant traffic engineer, but Mayor Thomas D'Alesandro, Jr. (father of Nancy Pelosi) was so impressed he hired Barnes as traffic commissioner. At Baltimore, Barnes installed a traffic-control computer that was, in 1957, the largest of its kind in the world. He had the pedestal honoring Johns Hopkins moved to Charles and 33rd Street; previously it had been responsible for a number of fatalities. Barnes asked the mayor for a raise from $18,000 to 20,000 and took the traffic commissioner position at New York City when the request was turned down.

=== New York City ===
Barnes was appointed traffic commissioner to New York City on January 15, 1962, by Mayor Robert F. Wagner, and kept on by Mayor John V. Lindsay. In 1962, Barnes fought with domineering city planner Robert Moses and killed the planned elevated Lower Manhattan Expressway. In 1963, he had an idea for expanding the Long Island Expressway capacity in Queens by adding three more lanes in each direction plus a second, four-lane deck above it. The upper deck would have no exits and run inbound in the morning and outbound in the evening. The "semi-actuated signal" that allows pedestrians to influence the change of traffic lights was another idea of Barnes, thought to have been introduced in 1964. With regards to the city's traffic signals, Barnes declared to repaint all of the traffic signals throughout the city of New York in the early 1960s. Prior to the early 1960s, traffic signals throughout the city were originally dark olive green. They were repainted yellow in the early 1960s. He was also involved in the completion of converting major avenues to one-way in New York City, a project started in 1949. He reportedly suggested solving Manhattan's traffic problems by making all avenues one-way, north. Barnes endorsed the use of seat belts, built municipal parking garages and implemented widespread use of parking meters.

== Recognition ==
Barnes was featured in Life Magazine November 13, 1964, edition – "New York's traffic jam doctor". He also appeared as a "Mystery Guest #1" on the television show What's My Line? which first aired on February 18, 1962. Barnes was also featured in Popular Mechanics Magazine in January 1953.

The Theodore M. Matson Memorial Award was bestowed on him in 1968.

His autobiography, The Man with the Red and Green Eyes, was dedicated to his wife, Hazel M. Barnes (September 1, 1909 - September 20, 1992).

== Death ==
Barnes died in September 1968 at age 61, suffering a heart attack on the job.

== Published works ==
- Autobiography – The Man with the Red and Green Eyes. Dutton. 1965. OCLC 522406.
- Barnes, Henry A. (November 1955). "Engineering Studies of Urban Traffic Flow". Journal of the Operations Research Society of America. 3 (4): 536–544. doi:10.1287/opre.3.4.536.
