= Yaletown =

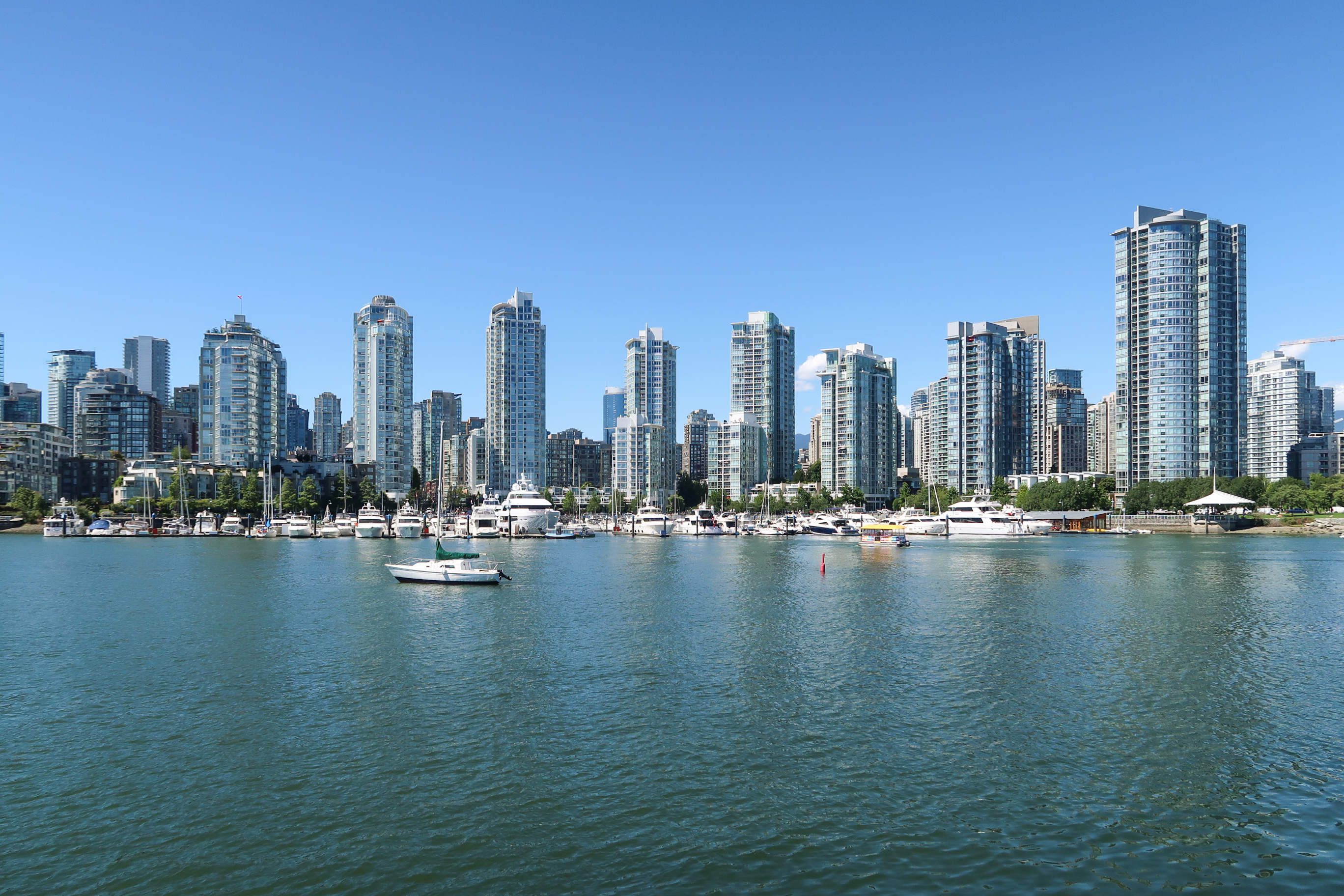
- Yaletown, as seen from False Creek

- Location in Metro Vancouver
- Coordinates: 49°16′32″N 123°7′15″W
- Country: Canada
- Province: British Columbia
- City: Vancouver
- Region: Downtown Vancouver

Yaletown is an area of Downtown Vancouver, Canada, bordered by False Creek and Robson and Homer Streets. Formerly a heavy industrial area dominated by warehouses and rail yards, since the 1986 World's Fair it has been transformed into one of the most densely populated neighbourhoods in the city.

== History ==
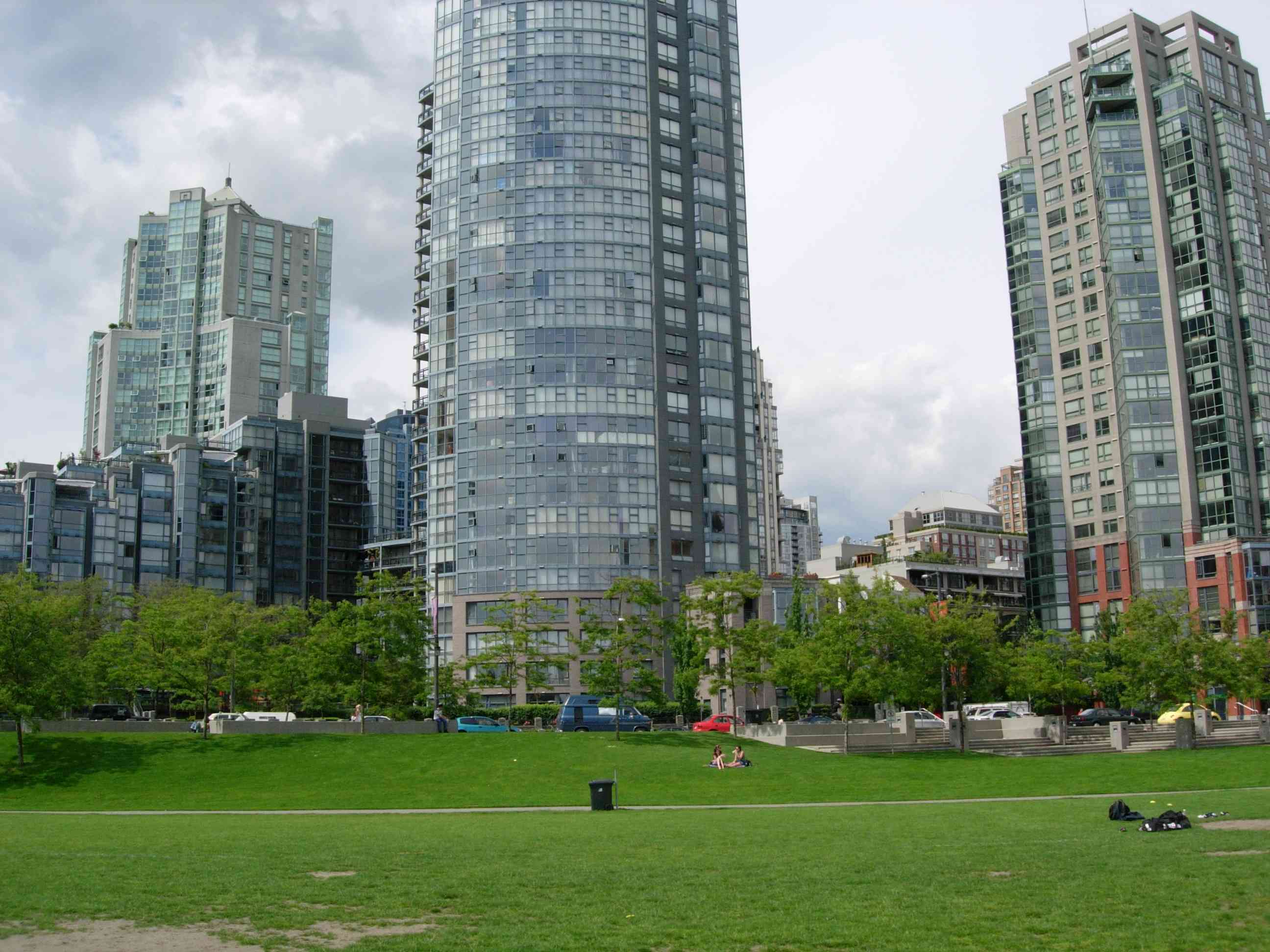
Yaletown, as seen from David Lam Park

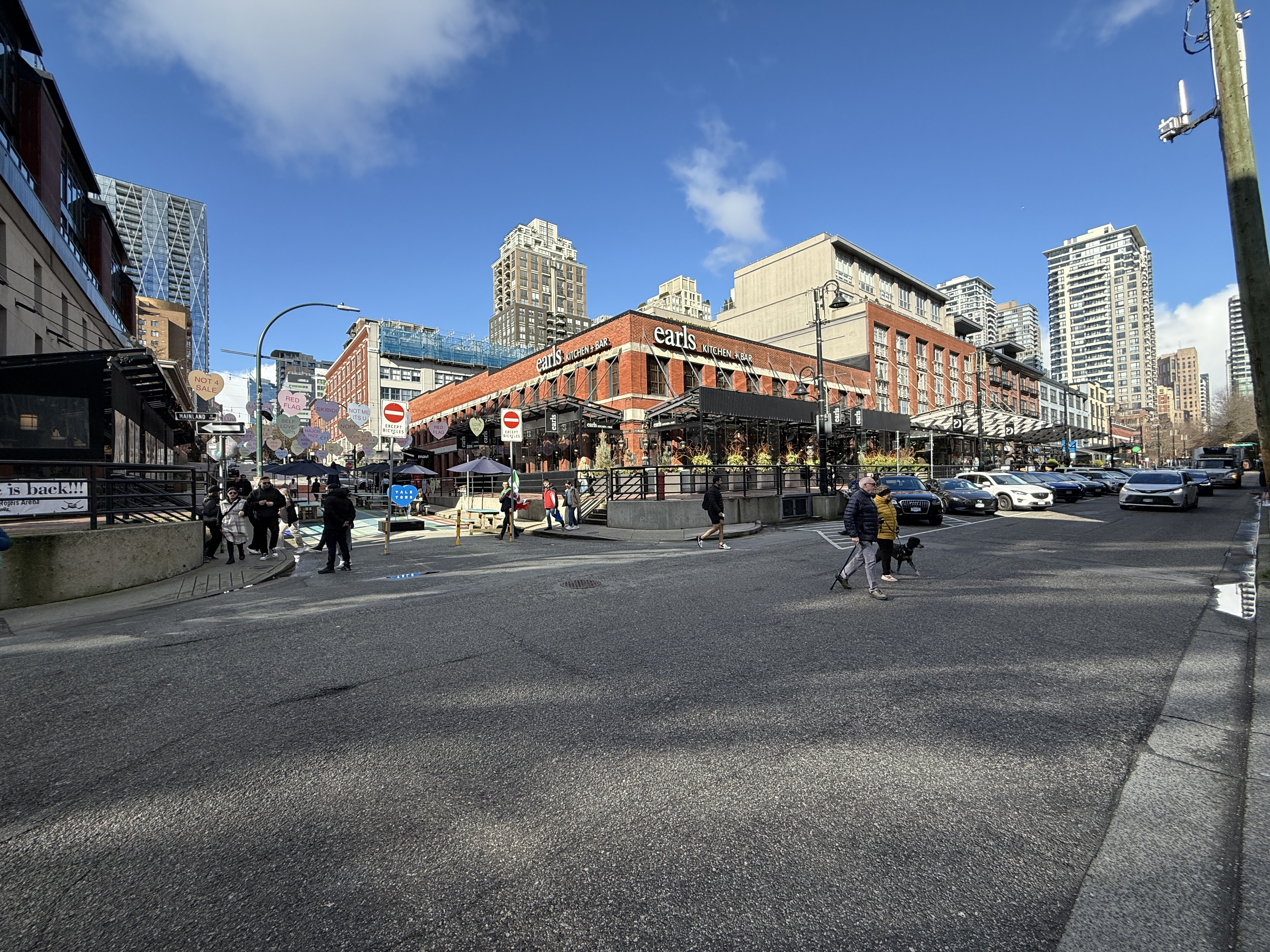
Mainland Street have several fine dining restaurants

Soon after the construction of bridges across False Creek in 1889, railway yards in the area were developed by the Canadian Pacific Railway (CPR) under the leadership of William Cornelius Van Horne. Many of the CPR workers were resettled from Yale, British Columbia, named after chief trader James Murray Yale, thus the name "Yaletown". Many of the brick railway-era buildings survive to this date.

After the real-estate boom and bust cycles of the 20th century, the area became shoddy and contaminated and was bought up by the city. After Expo 86, held on neighbouring former industrial land, the whole area became ripe for development. The site was sold to Hong Kong–based developer Li Ka-shing, setting in motion the redevelopment process which continues to this day.

== Planning and architecture ==
From the start, city planners imposed strict guidelines on the development, in particular requiring a substantial amount of development of the public realm and preservation of existing heritage stock. In part, the city's adoption of new zoning plans in the Central Area Plan (1991) also aided in the process of rejuvenation by establishing objectives of improving livability and providing for office space within Yaletown, as well as preserving its heritage structures. Thus there are generous areas set aside for parks, waterfront access, community centres, and schools. Along the shore of False Creek, the Stanley Park Seawall linear park has been continued through the area, forming its southern boundary.

While little or no original housing from the 19th century survives, several older buildings from the industrial days still exist. Hamilton Street and Mainland Street are the most significant, comprising two intact streetscapes from that era. They are lined with handsome brick warehouses built on rail platforms, many with cantilevered canopies. These have been converted into loft style apartments and offices, with boutique stores, bars and restaurants at the ground level. During the latter years of the dot com boom in the late 1990s, these streets housed Vancouver's "multimedia gulch", similar to the SOMA area of San Francisco.

Nearby, at the junction of Davie Street and Pacific Boulevard, an old brick Canadian Pacific railway roundhouse (Drake Street Roundhouse) has been converted into the Roundhouse Community Centre, which uses the old engine turntable as a small outdoor amphitheatre. In another tribute to the rail history of the area, it also houses Engine No. 374, which pulled the first passenger train into Vancouver in 1887.

Spilling around the central core of Hamilton and Mainland Streets, most other architecture in Yaletown is newly built on the old derelict yards, the vast majority in a uniform glass and concrete high-rise style. Most of these buildings are apartment blocks.

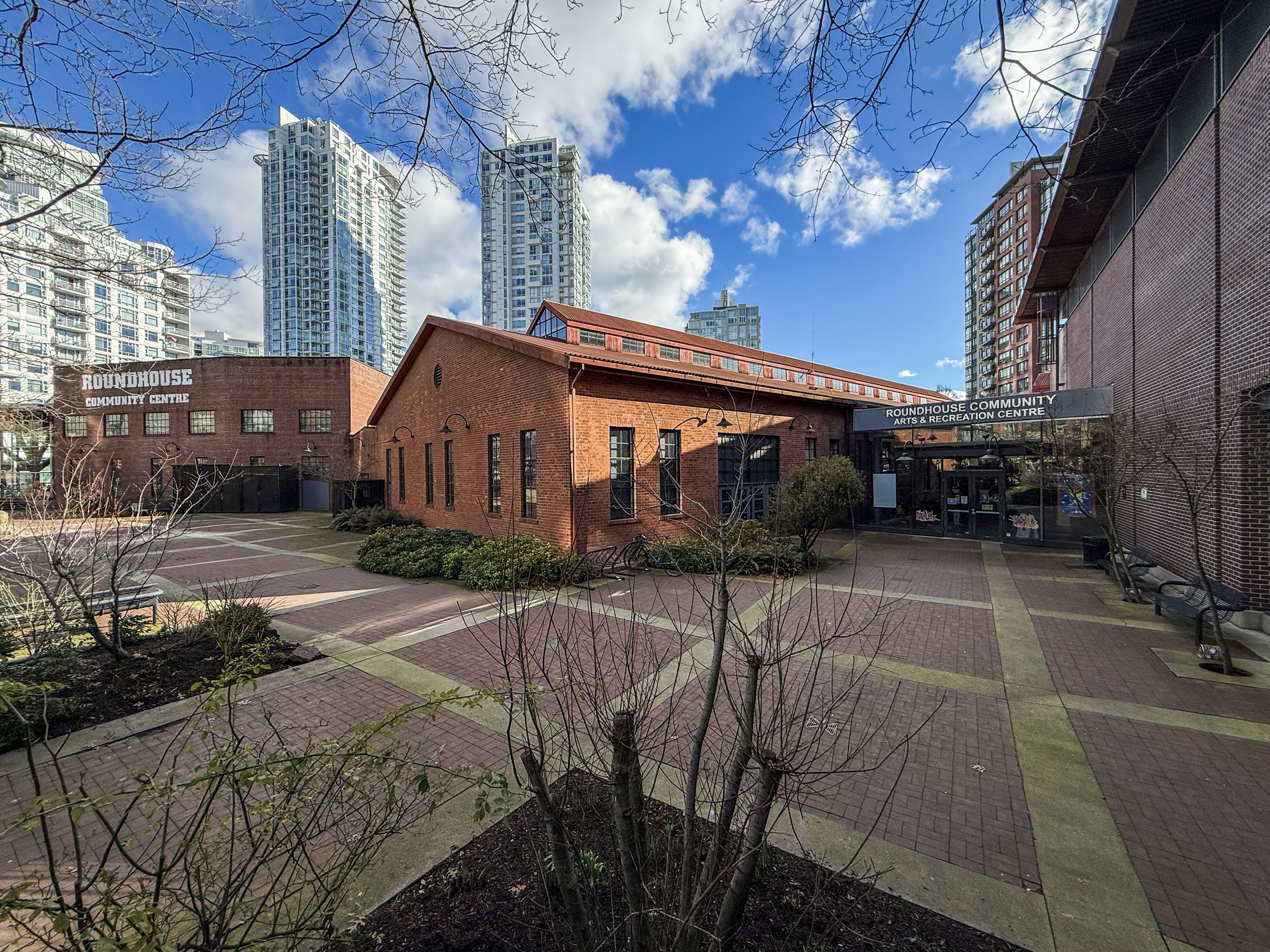
Roundhouse Community Arts & Recreation Centre

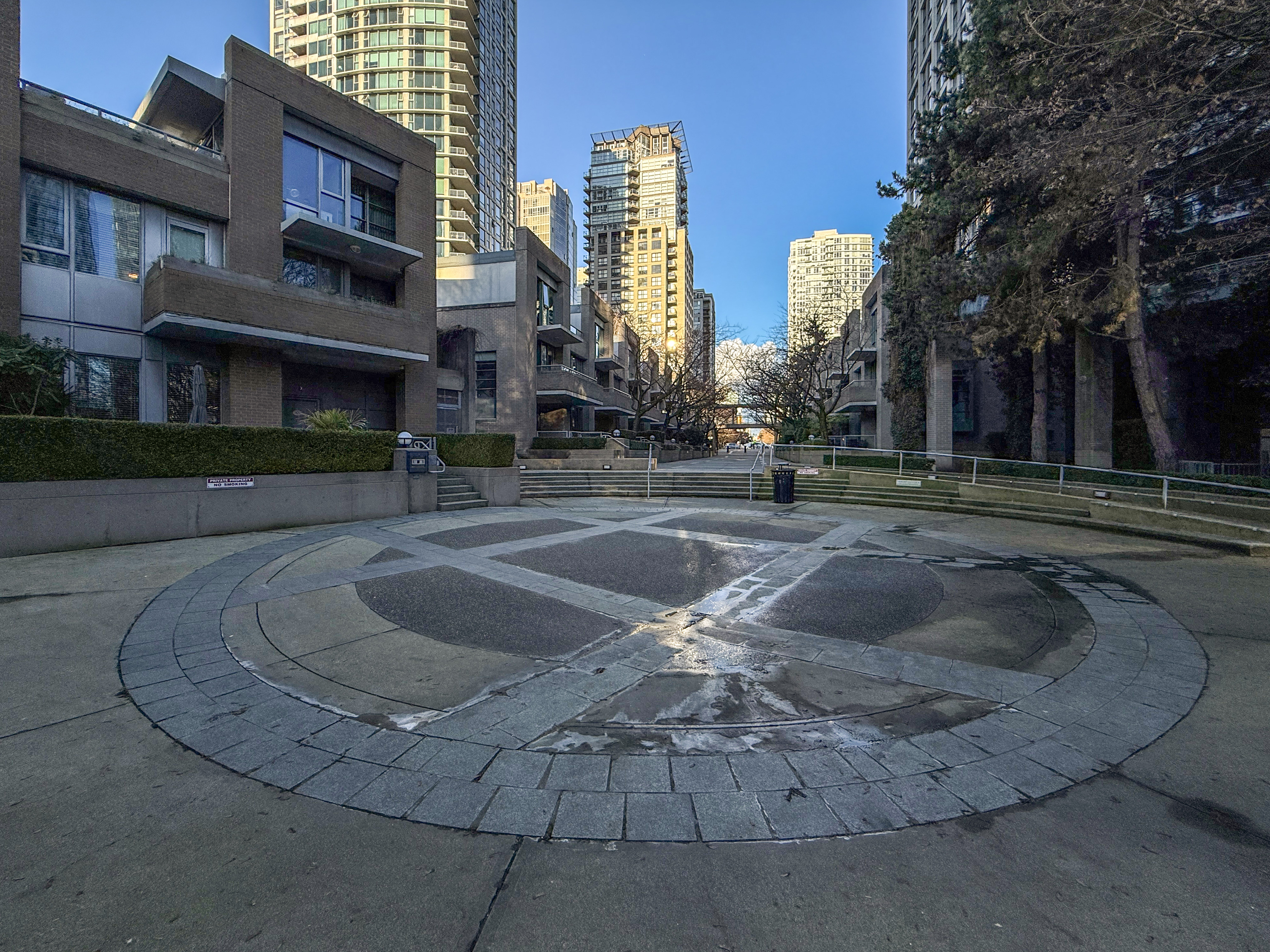
Beatty Walk in Yaletown

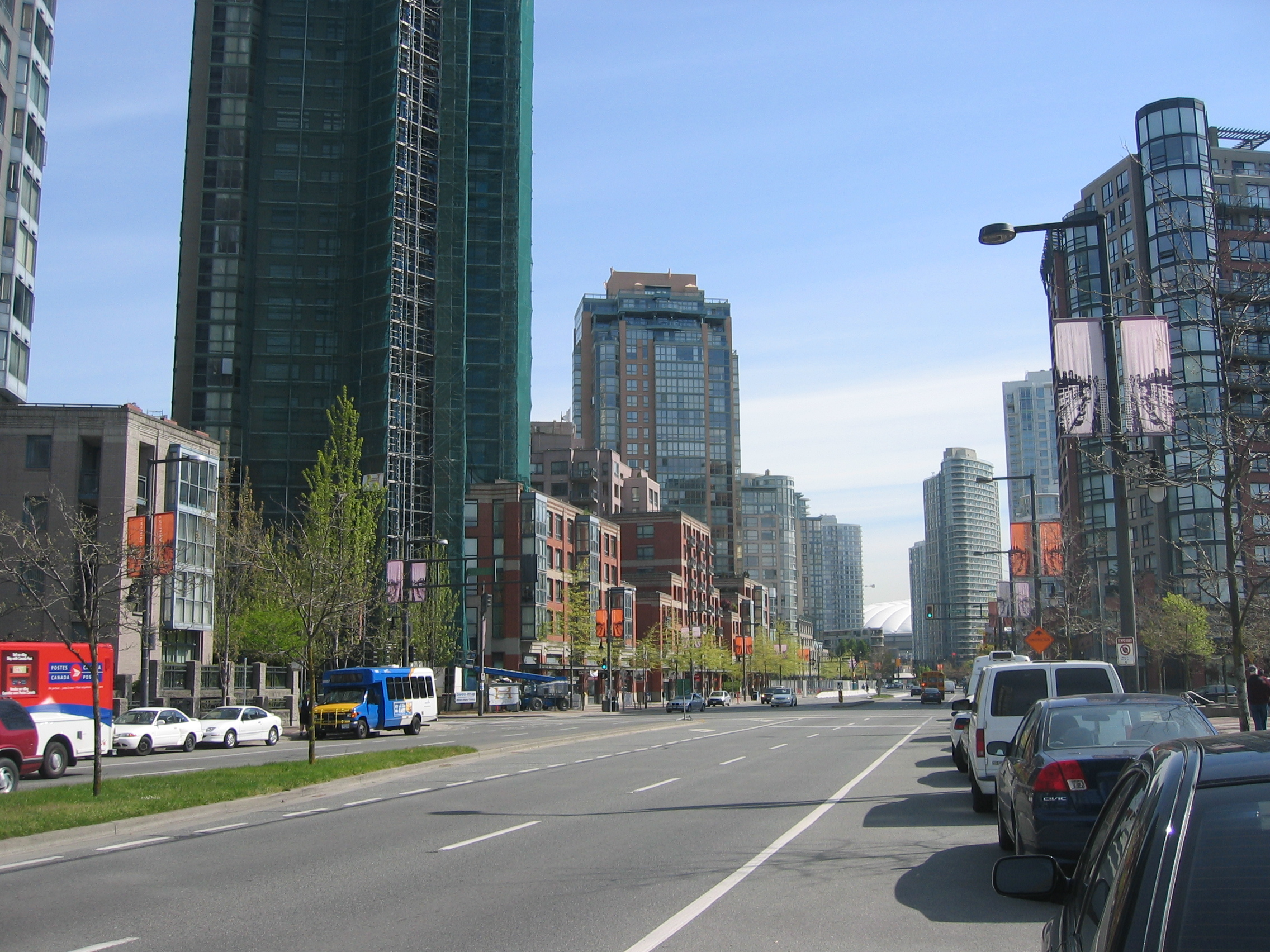
Pacific Boulevard, one of the major roads in Yaletown

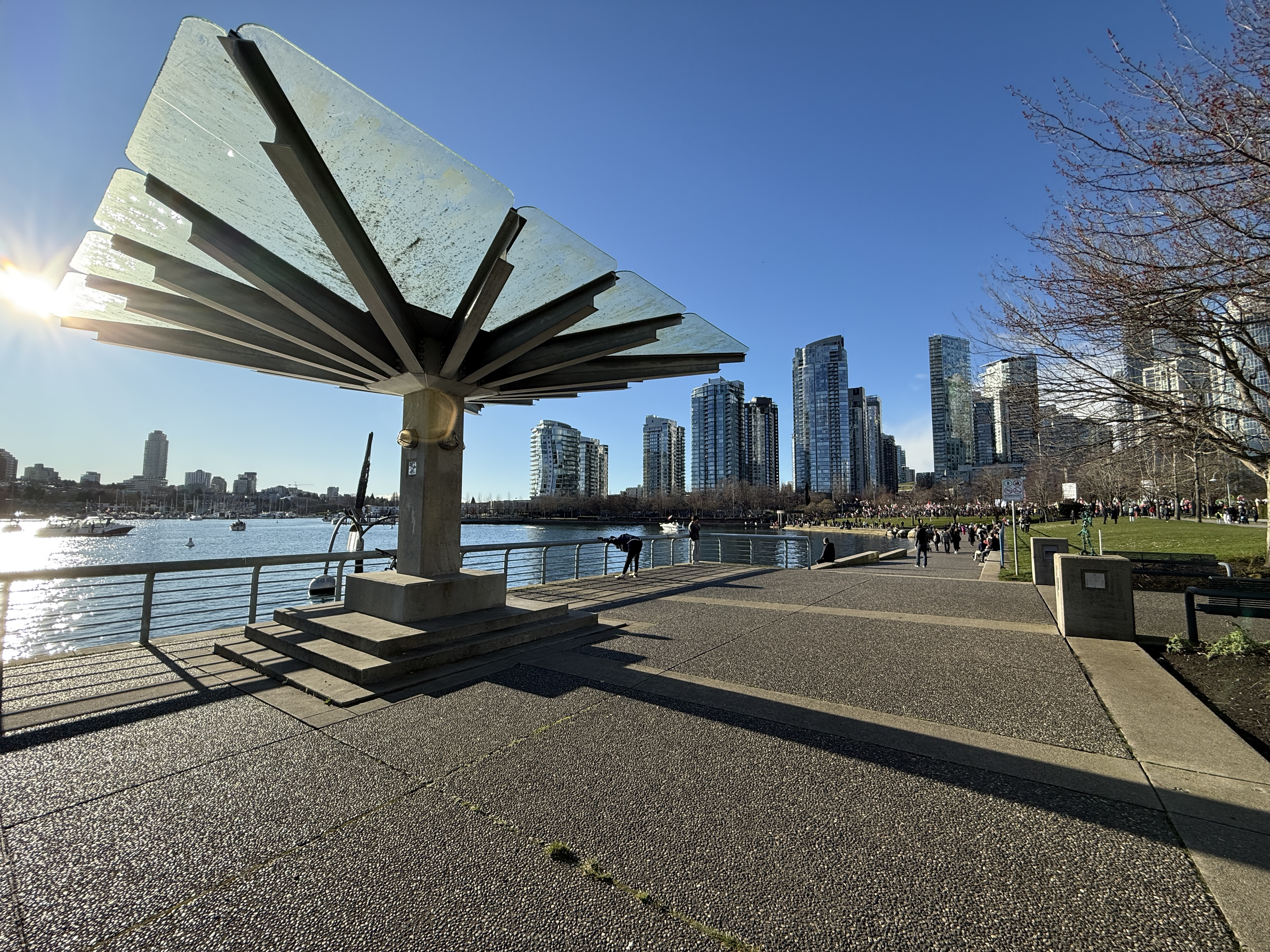
The view from David Lam Park, overlooking False Creek

== Transportation ==
The Aquabus and False Creek Ferries provide passenger service from Yaletown to various stops around False Creek, including Granville Island and Science World. Yaletown is served by the Yaletown–Roundhouse SkyTrain station on the Canada Line, as well as buses 6 and 23.

== Education ==
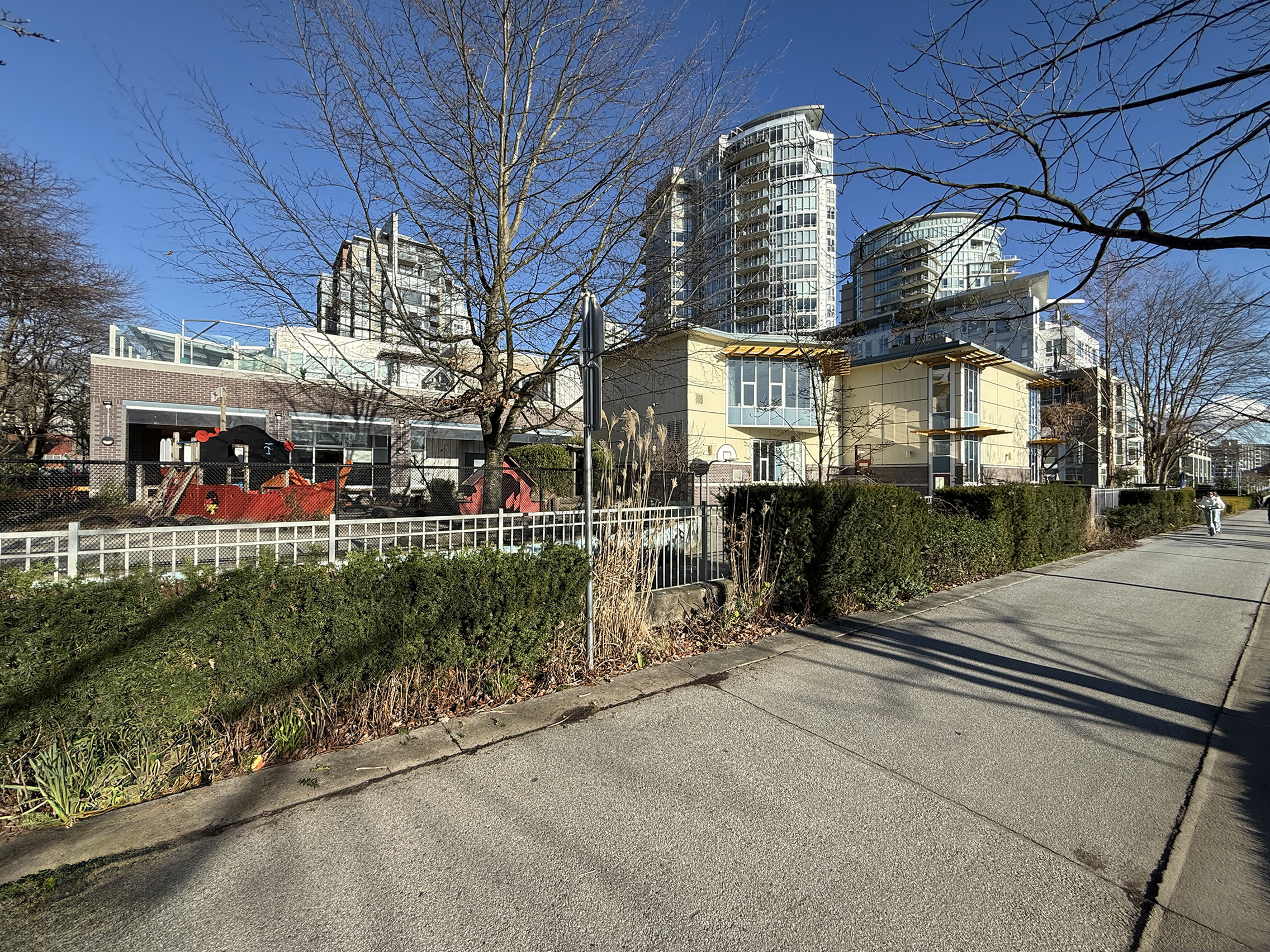
Dorothy Lam Children's Centre and Elsie Roy Elementary School

The Yaletown waterfront is also home to Elsie Roy Elementary School, the first new elementary school to be opened in an inner-city Vancouver neighbourhood since 1975. Yaletown is also home to a number of English language schools.

== See also ==
- Vancouverism
