= 2010 Olympic Village =

Residential development in Vancouver, British Columbia, Canada

Coordinates: 49°16′15″N 123°6′24″W

Vancouver Olympic Village
- Neighbourhood / Olympic Village
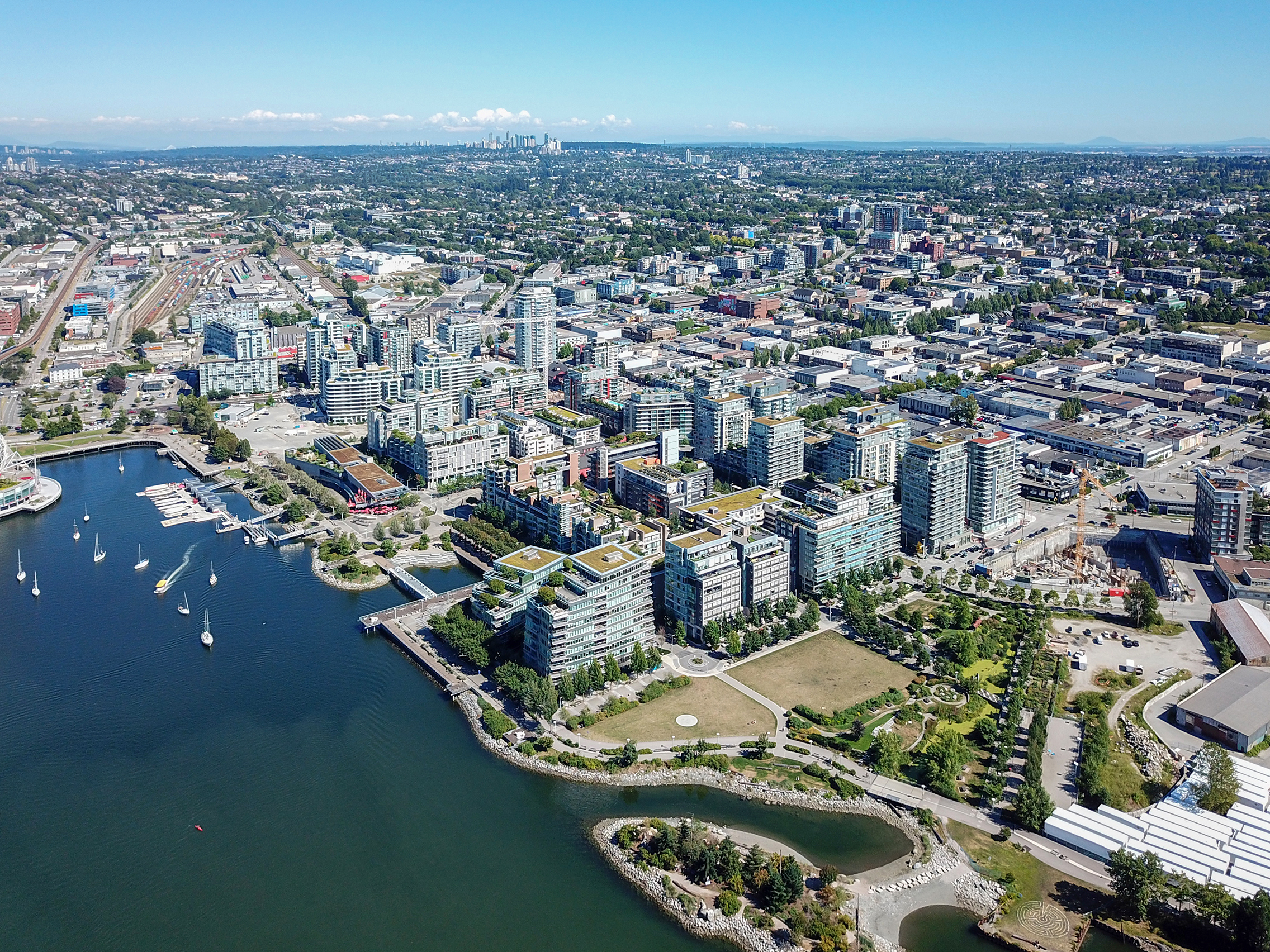
- Interactive map of Vancouver Olympic Village
- Country: Canada
- City: Vancouver, British Columbia
- Neighbourhood: Southeast False Creek
- Construction began: February 2006
- Completed: November 1, 2009; 17 years ago
- Built by: Millennium Development Group
- Key people: Peter Malek, Shahram Malek
- Named for: 2010 Winter Olympics and Paralympics

The Vancouver Olympic Village (VVL) is a neighbourhood and Olympic Village built by Millennium Development Group in Vancouver, British Columbia, Canada, originally built for the 2010 Winter Olympics and 2010 Winter Paralympics.

The site is located on the shoreline at the southeast corner of False Creek, north of First Avenue between Ontario and Columbia Streets.

Boasting over a thousand units, ranging over a million square feet, the Village was able to accommodate over 2,800 athletes, coaches, and officials for the 2010 Winter Olympics.

Following the Olympics, the accommodations became residential housing. Today, the Village is a mixed-use community, with approximately 1,100 residential units, area parks, and various retail and service outlets. Southeast False Creek is the neighbourhood development that was built around the Olympic Village and in which the Village now sits at the core of.

== Whistler Olympic and Paralympic Village ==
The Whistler Olympic and Paralympic Village (WVL), located in Whistler, British Columbia, also served the 2010 Winter Olympics and the 2010 Winter Paralympics. Smaller than the VVL, it accommodated 2,400 athletes, coaches, and officials with 450 beds made especially with wheelchair access. Site preparation began in 2006 with construction starting in March 2007 and it was completed in Summer 2009.

== Village overview ==
The Vancouver Olympic Village is located in section 2A of Southeast False Creek

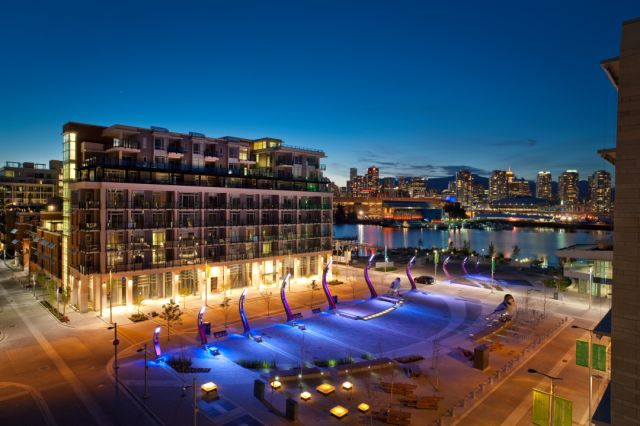
Olympic Village Square

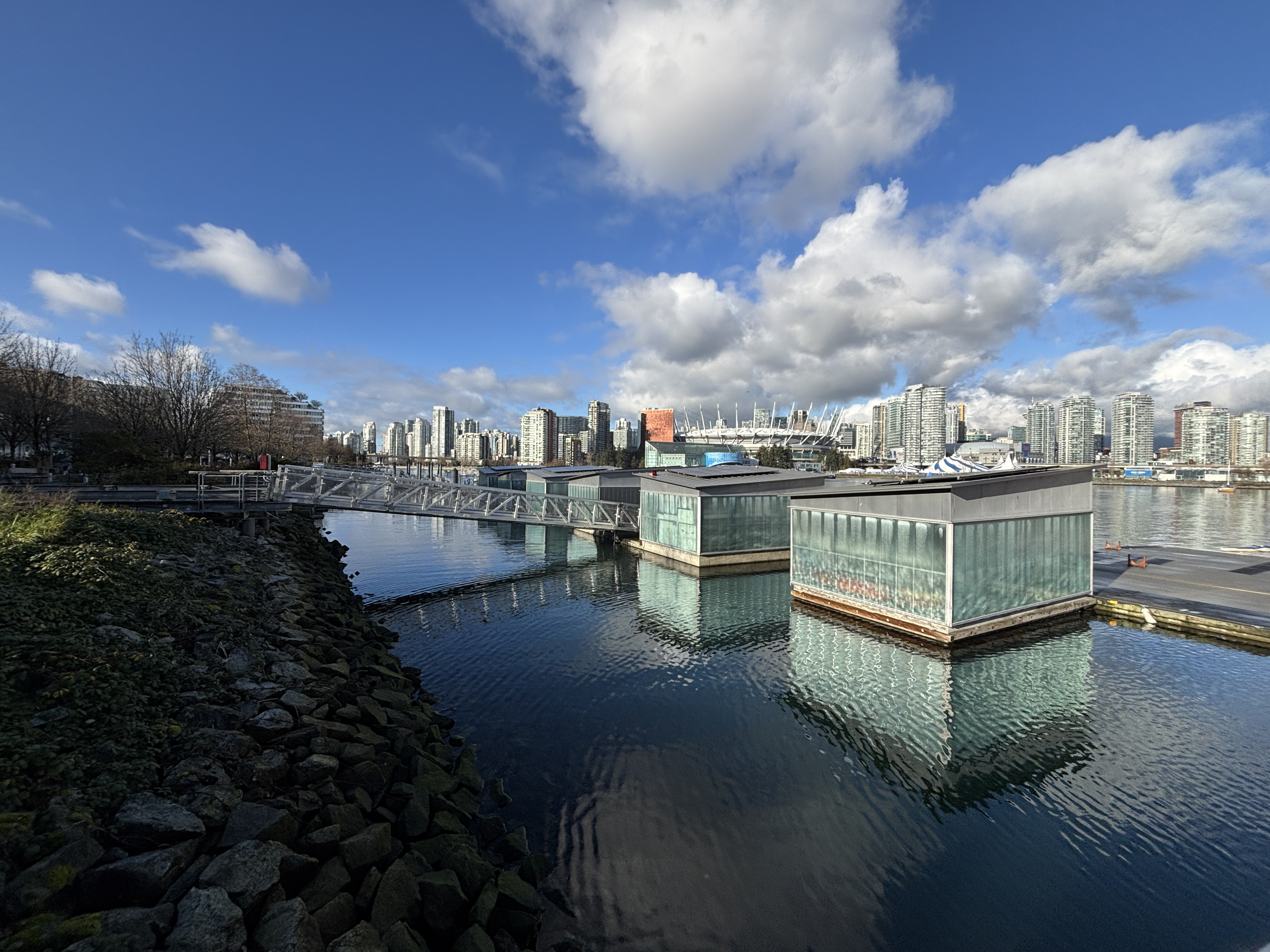
Olympic Village Ferry Dock

The site, a former industrial area which mostly consisted of parking lots, is located on the shoreline at the southeast corner of False Creek, north of First Avenue between Ontario and Columbia Streets. Just south of Science World, its waterfront is part of the False Creek Seawall promenade and bike route, and is adjacent to the stations of the former Vancouver Downtown Historic Railway, the Spyglass Place pedestrian ferry wharf (served by Aquabus and False Creek Ferries), the Science World pedestrian ferry wharf (normally served by Aquabus and False Creek Ferries but closed temporarily from 25 January 2010 to 24 March 2010), and the Main Street and Olympic Village SkyTrain stations.

Boasting over a thousand units, ranging over a million square feet, the Village was able to accommodate over 2,800 athletes, coaches, and officials for the 2010 Winter Olympics.

Following the Olympics, the accommodations became residential housing. Today, the Village is a mixed-use community, with approximately 1,100 residential units, area parks, and various retail and service outlets.

Southeast False Creek is the designation given to the neighbourhood that the Olympic Village resides in, bordered by Cambie, Main, West 2nd Avenue, and False Creek. In 2012, the site had 252 affordable housing units and another 100 units are for "modest market housing". The City of Vancouver projected that Southeast False Creek would eventually become home to up to 16,000 people by 2020.

As part of the development, Millennium Development Group built the Creekside Community Recreation Centre, a 45,000 sq ft (4,200 m^{2}) LEED platinum-standard community centre that opened in summer 2010.

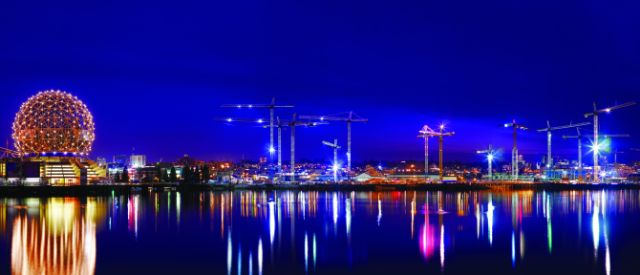
Olympic Village during construction

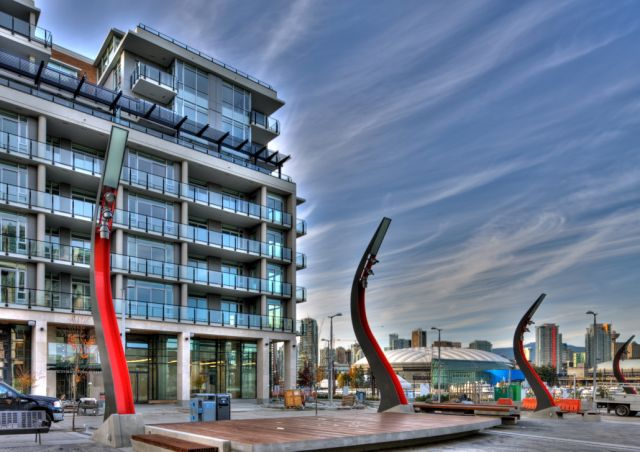
Vancouver 2010 Olympic Truce Installation

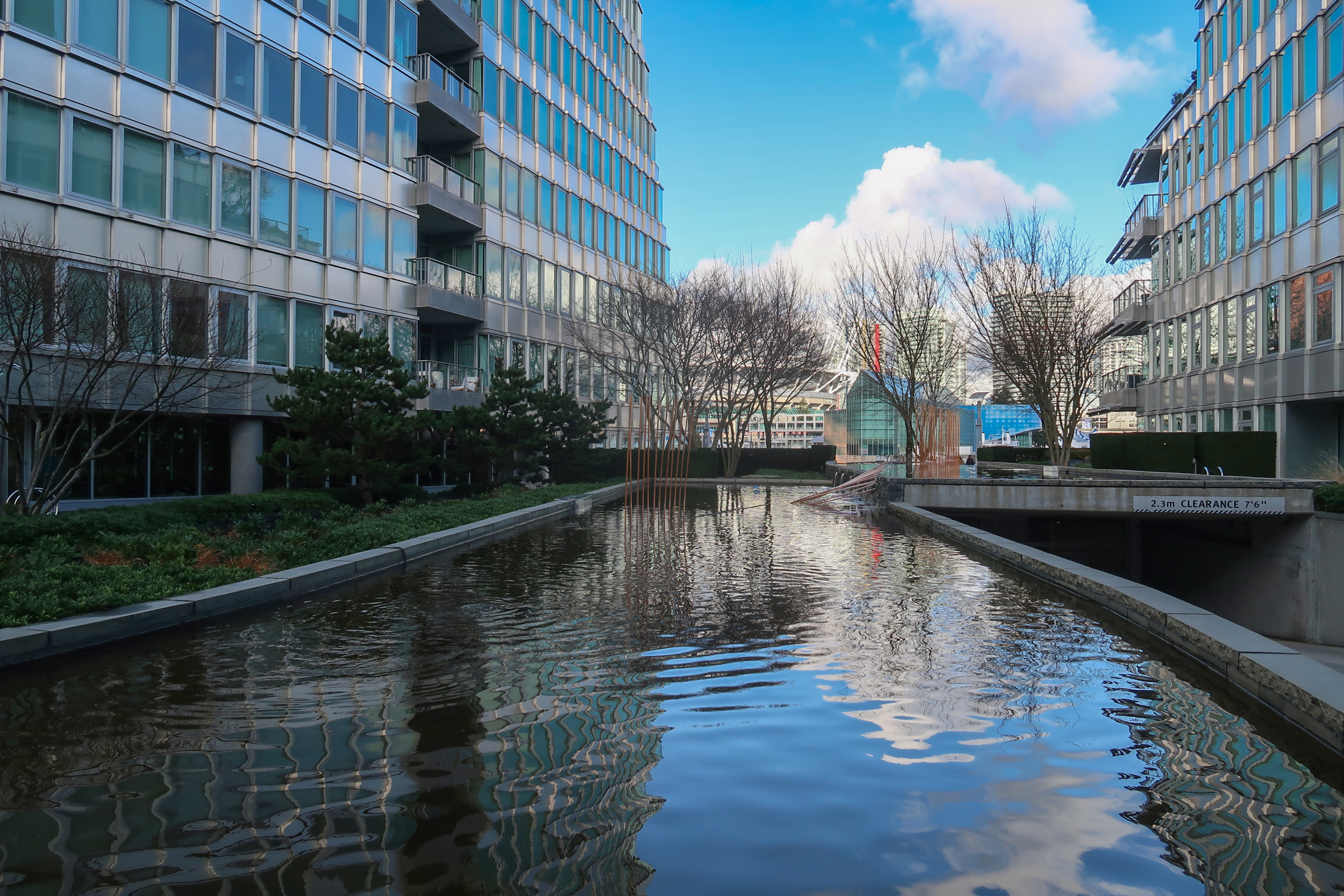
181 Athletes Way landscape area

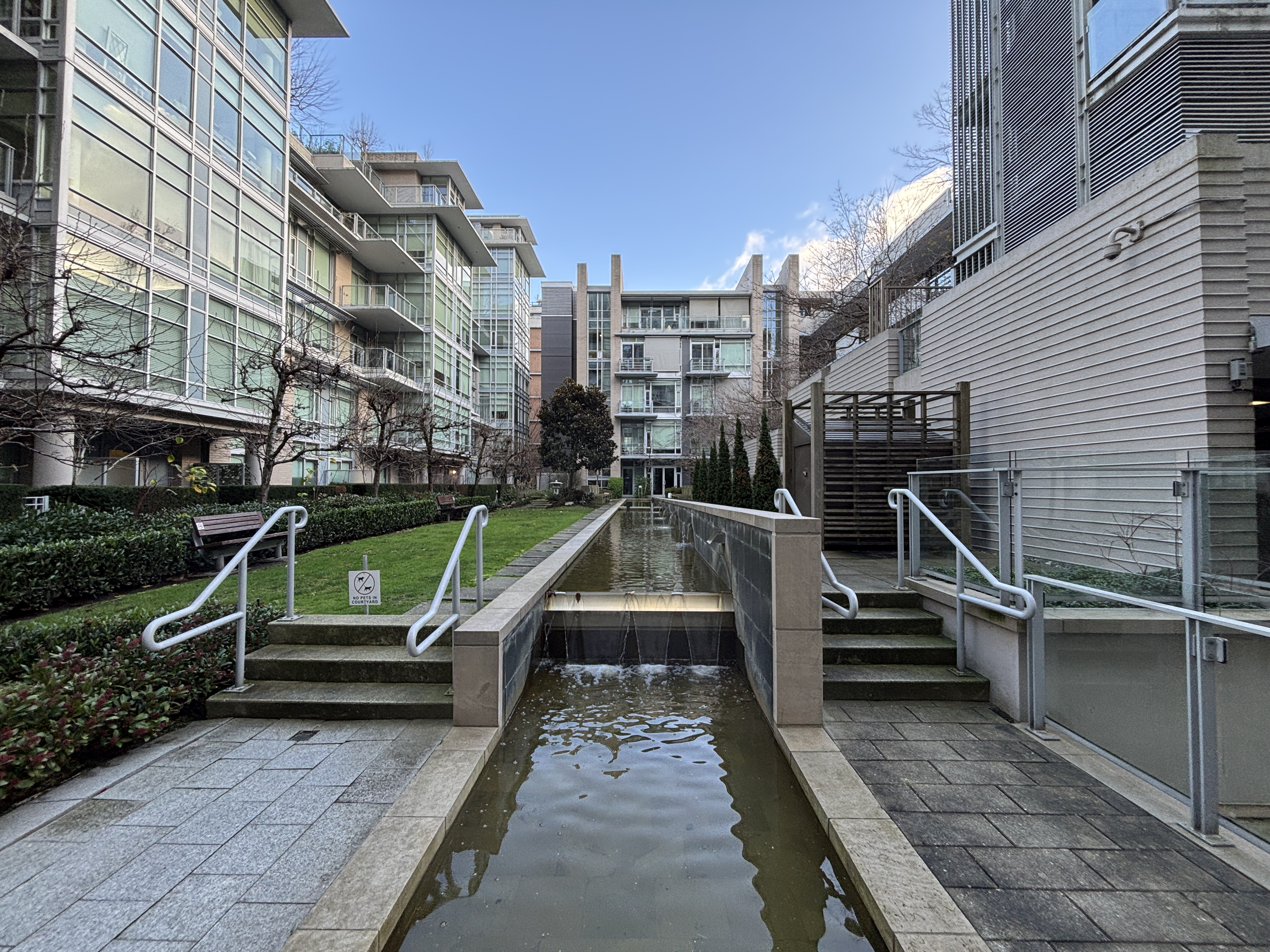
Garden in Kayak - Village On False Creek

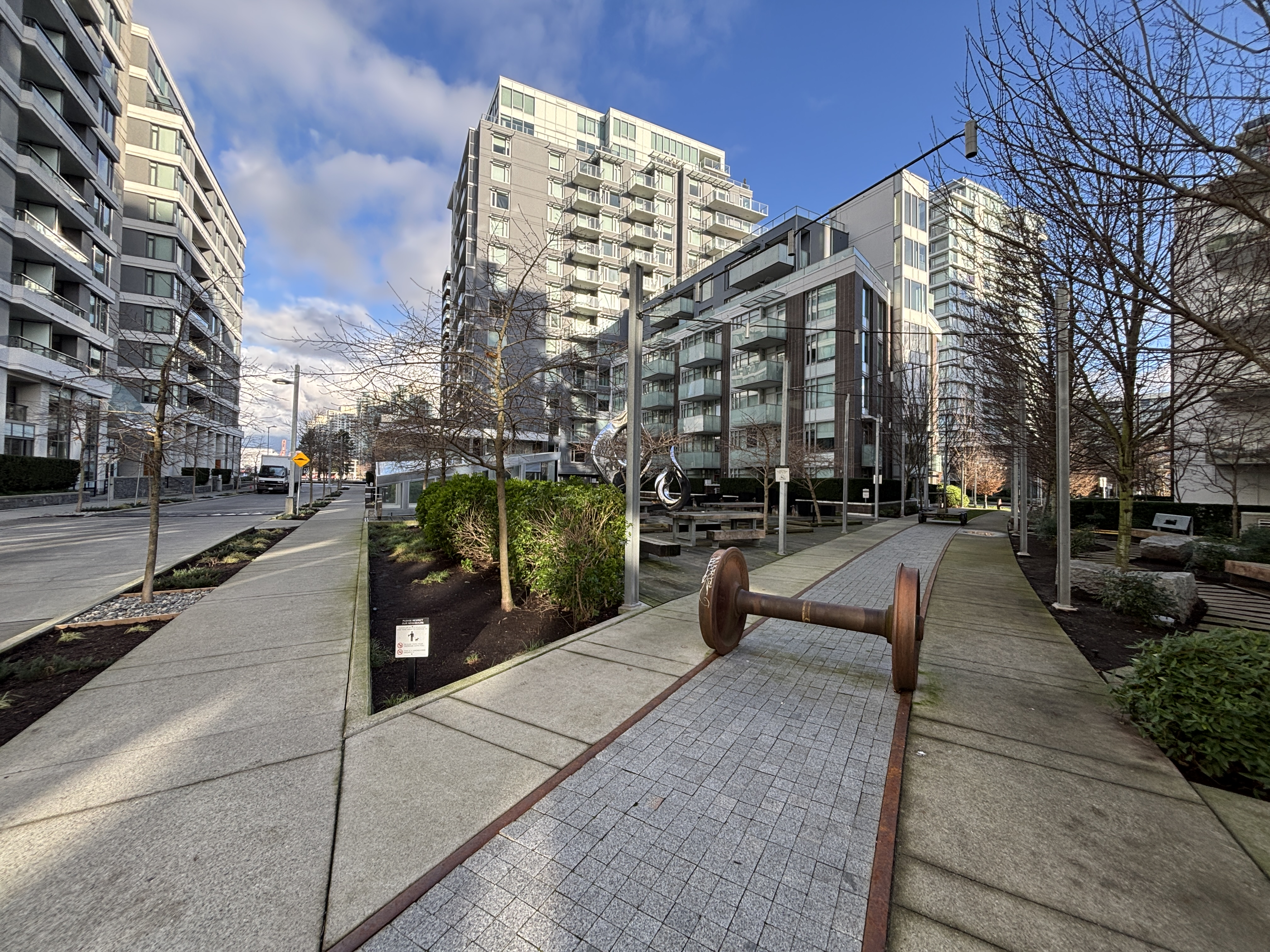
Former Historic Railway near Pullman Porter Street

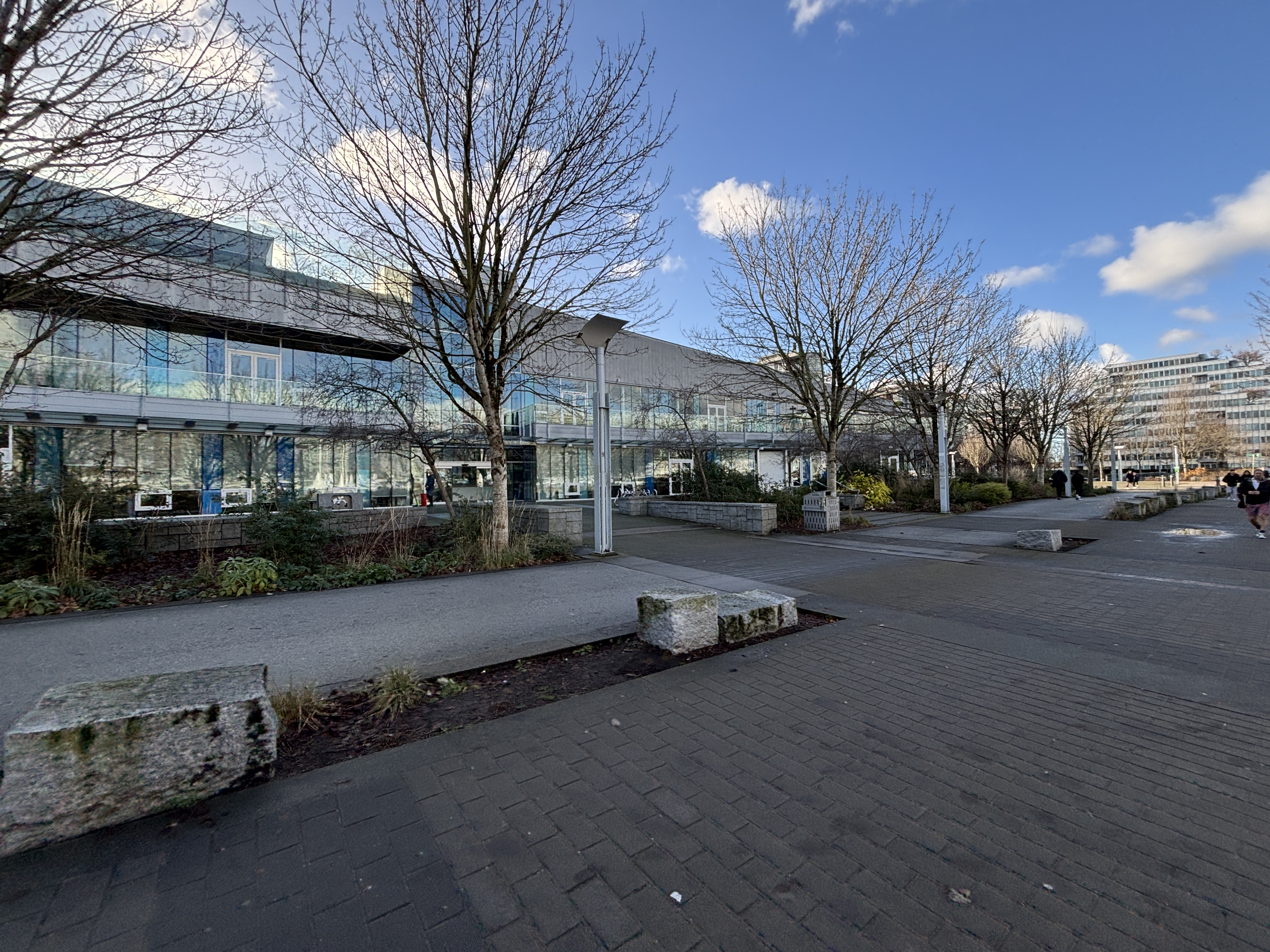
Creekside Community Recreation Centre

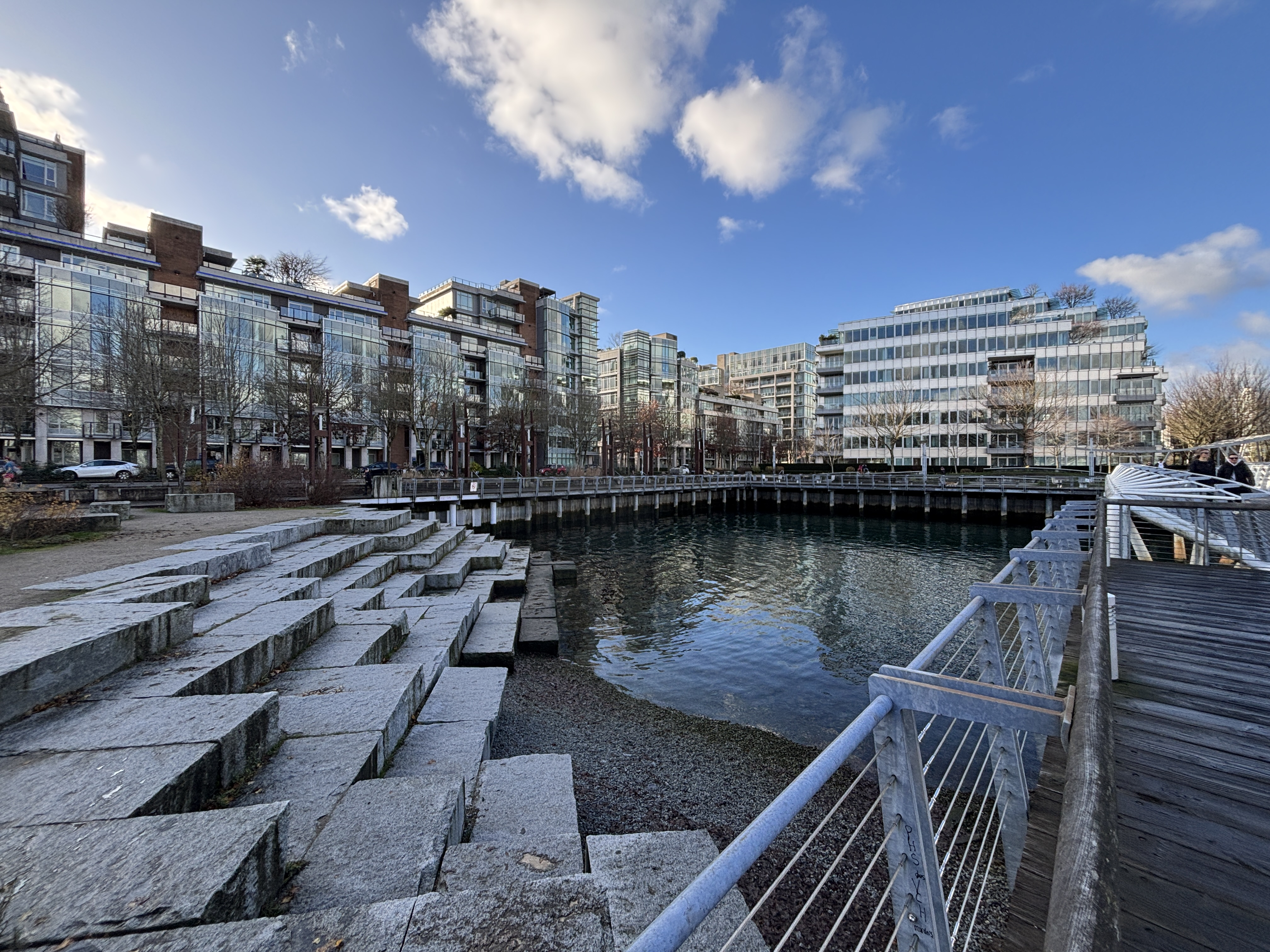
Waterfront steps near Canoe Bridge

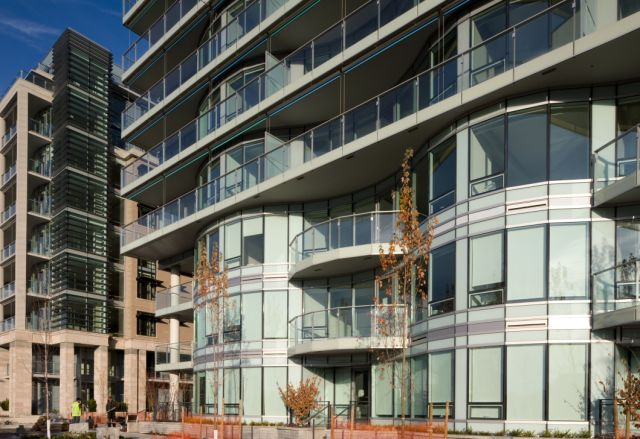
Townhouse in 181 W 1st Ave

== History ==
=== Construction ===
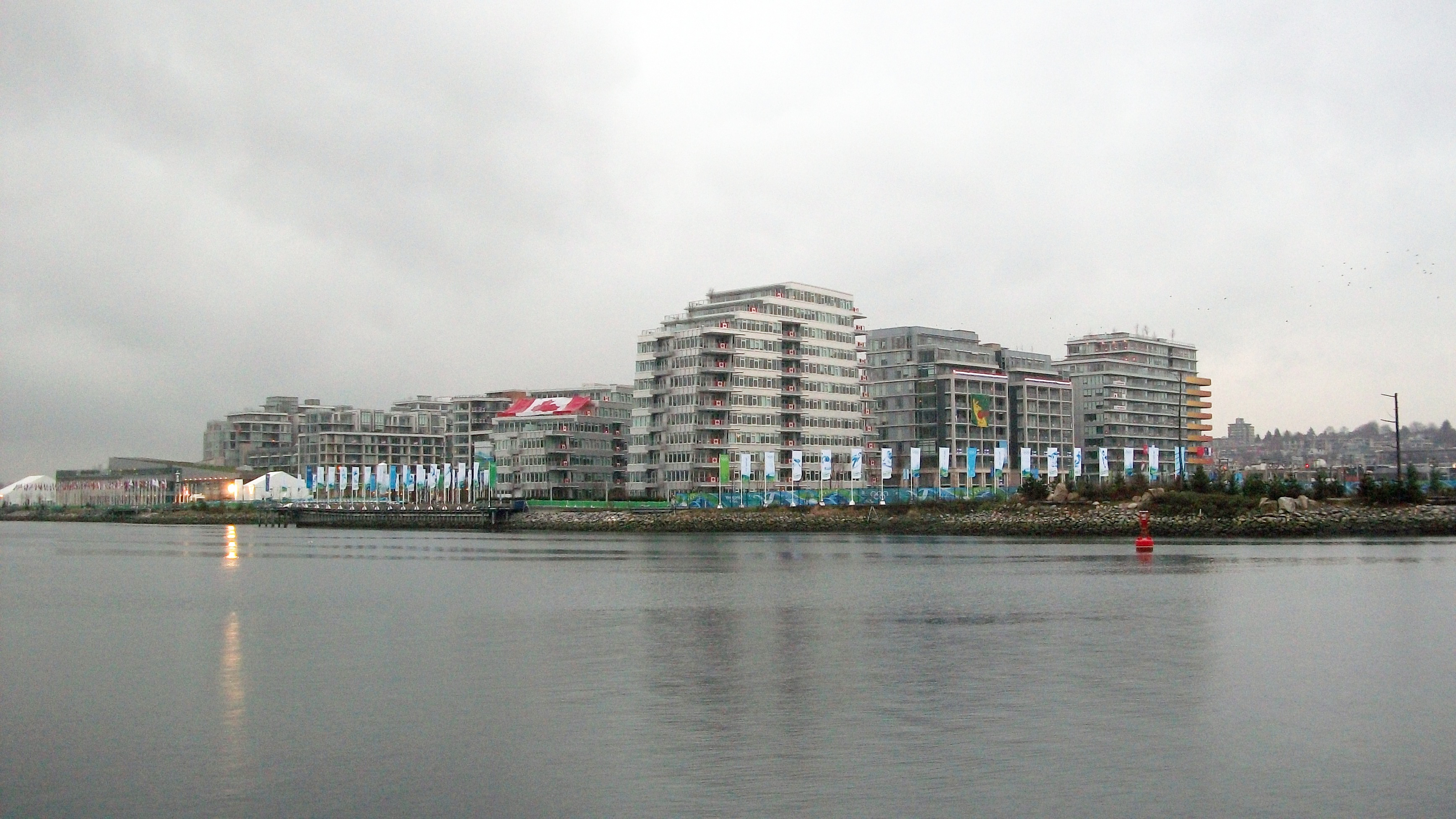
The Olympic Village shot from across False Creek, two days before the Opening Ceremonies of the 2010 Olympics.

Preparation and construction of the site began in February 2006. Construction was completed on 1 November 2009 by Millennium Development Group, and turned over to the Vancouver Organizing Committee for the 2010 Olympic and Paralympic Winter Games (VANOC) for use during the Winter Games. On 7 April 2010, it was returned to the City of Vancouver. The village was converted into residential housing, a community centre, daycare, retail, and service spaces.

Residents released video documenting problems with their units, including water pouring out of light fixtures, heat not working, cracks in ceilings, hardwood floors bubbling from moisture and bedrooms too small to fit a bed. More than 60 condo owners at the Village filed a class-action lawsuit against the builder. The lawsuits were subsequently dropped.

Rennie Marketing Systems executive director Bob Rennie mentioned that any construction deficiencies were "minor". “On TV, a toilet leaked,” he said. “That ran for three minutes and everybody thought that the whole village was like that.”

=== Funding crisis ===
In September 2007, a three-way deal was struck to complete the village with minimal public money: the developer, Millennium Developments, would build the project and sell the units as condominiums, borrowing funds from New York-based investment firm Fortress Investment Group, with the City of Vancouver acting as guarantor, leasing the land to Millennium until the games were complete.

Amid high supply and labour costs, slow condo sales, and the ongoing U.S. subprime mortgage crisis, Fortress halted its funds in September 2008, leaving Millennium in "anticipatory default". Thus, the city in its role as guarantor became responsible for finding funds to complete the project. In October 2008, city council advanced $100 million to Millennium, which was not made public until three weeks after. The city's Chief Financial Officer resigned shortly before the municipal election in November 2008.

The election resulted in the defeat of the NPA: candidate Peter Ladner was defeated, and Vision Vancouver gained control of council and the mayoralty. Ladner's defeat has been directly ascribed to the secret loan, as Vision promised more transparency in the city's finances.

At the beginning of 2009, costs continued to go over budget and the city faced a $458 million shortfall. On 15 January 2009, the deputy city manager overseeing construction of the Olympic Village resigned. Prime minister Stephen Harper ruled out any possibility of a bailout from the federal government.

With time running out, mayor Gregor Robertson made a request to the provincial government to amend the Vancouver Charter to allow the city to borrow extra funds, asserting that losses would be mitigated by rising property values. On 18 January 2009, an emergency meeting of the Legislative Assembly approved Bill 47, the Vancouver Charter Amendment Act, allowing the City of Vancouver to borrow unlimited sums for the Olympic Village—without the ordinary voter referendum required by previous legislation. The city then proceeded to buy out Fortress's share of the project, becoming the sole lender to Millennium.

In November 2010, seven months after the successful completion of the games, the village's holding company and the City of Vancouver agreed to place the property into voluntary receivership.

In 2014, a Vancouver Sun review by Rob MacDonald, a notable Vancouver developer, praised Millennium for their accomplishment in creating the Vancouver Olympic Village under trying circumstances. The same year, the city sold off the last shares in the project and cleared its debt from 2009. A later assessment in 2020 regarded the project as a success, creating a thriving neighbourhood.

=== Australia banner controversy ===
A giant banner hung from the Village by members of the Australian team attracted controversy in early February 2010 when a member of the International Olympic Committee toured the site and expressed concern that it might contravene policy, as the banner is not the flag of Australia but rather depicts a kangaroo wearing boxing gloves. The Australian deputy prime minister at the time Julia Gillard called the request for the banner's removal a disgrace. According to a representative of the Australian team, the flag has been at every Olympic Village since the 2000 Games in Sydney. The image had flown from the victorious Australian yacht in the 1983 America's Cup and is now a mascot of Australia's Olympic teams; the Australian Olympic Committee owns the image's trademark. After IOC president Jacques Rogge discussed the issue with John Coates, chief of the AOC, it was confirmed that the flag could remain at the Olympic Village. "While the IOC is of the view that the display of the boxing kangaroo at the Olympic village is a breach of the IOC rules relating to clean venues, the IOC is not going to request us to take down the boxing kangaroo flag on this occasion," Coates said. The AOC was required to register the image with the IOC. The controversy sparked a demand for a version of the boxing-kangaroo flag at a Vancouver flag shop.

=== Post-Olympics ===
Following the Olympics, the Village became a mixed-use community with approximately 1,100 residential units, area parks, and various retail and service outlets. In 2012, the site had 252 affordable housing units and another 100 units are for "modest market housing". The City of Vancouver projected that Southeast False Creek would eventually become home to up to 16,000 people by 2020.

On 28 April 2014, the City of Vancouver officially paid down the entire $630 million debt of the Olympic Village development and recovered an additional $70 million.

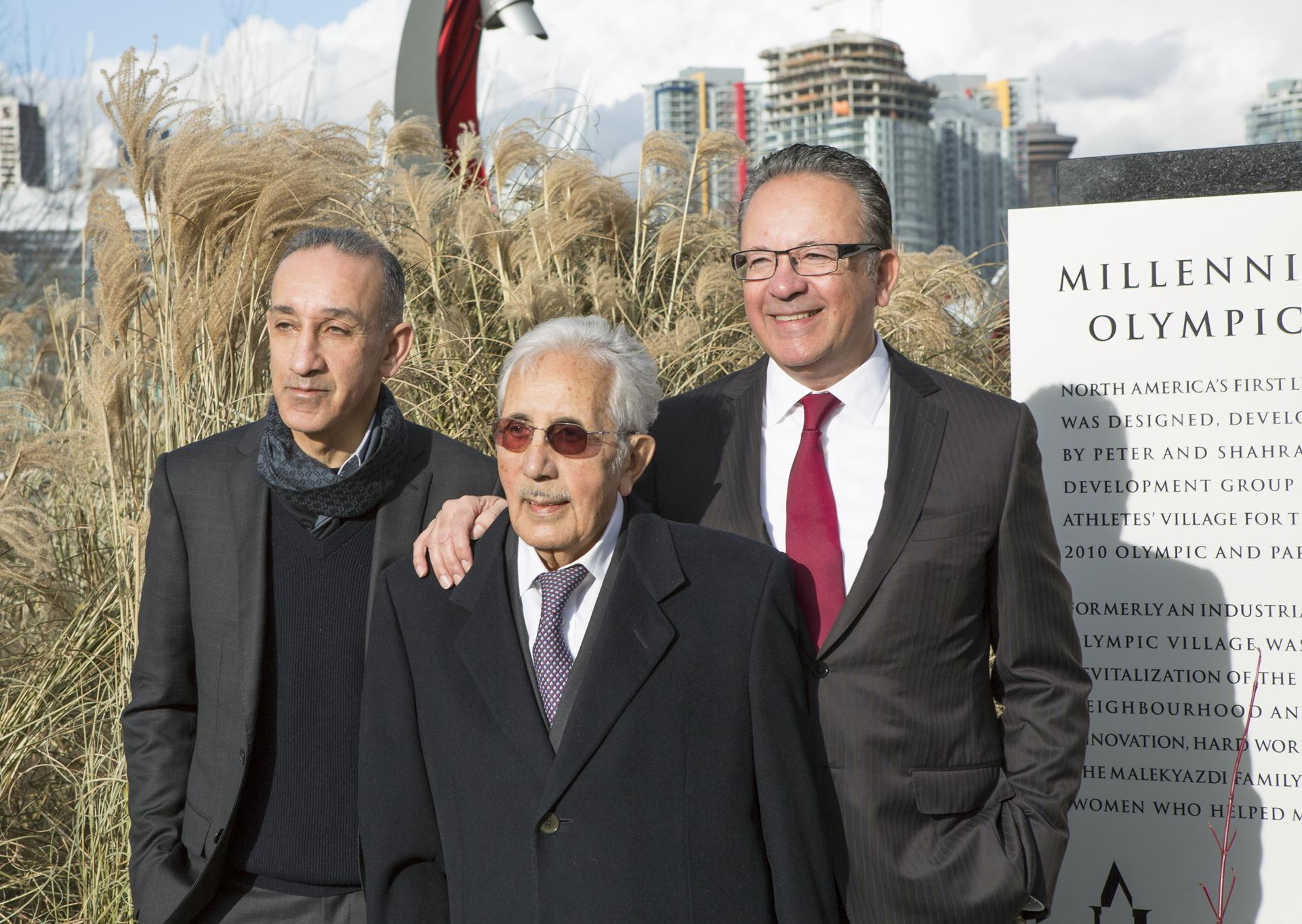
The Olympic Village plaque unveiling honoring Millennium Development Group. Shahram Malek (left), Amir Malekyazdi (middle), Peter Malek (right).

On 12 December 2014, the City unveiled a plaque honouring Millennium Development Group's role in designing, developing and constructing the Olympic Village, named "Millennium Water Olympic Village". The wording on the plaque states:

North America's first LEED Platinum community was designed, developed and constructed by Peter and Shahram Malek's Millennium Development Group in time to open as the athletes' village for the successful Vancouver 2010 Olympic and Paralympic Winter Games.

Formerly an industrial site, Millennium Water Olympic Village was the catalyst for the revitalization of the surrounding False Creek neighbourhood and is a testament to the innovation, hard work and community spirit of the Malekyazdi family and hundreds of men and women who helped make this vision a reality.

== See also ==
- List of Olympic Villages
