= Coastal Link Ferries =

Canadian ferry company

- Industry: Transportation
- Founded: 2008
- Headquarters: British Columbia, Canada
- Key people: Ihab Shaker, CEO
- Services: Ferry service

Coastal Link Ferries was a ferry company in the Lower Mainland of British Columbia, Canada.

Its vessel, the Coastal Runner, began service in October 2008 between Bowen Island and Vancouver Public Dock in Coal Harbour. The crossing takes 40 minutes.

The vessel carries 67 passengers and has Wi-Fi, washrooms, and tables for passengers.

In October 2009, the company was unanimously approved by the West Vancouver city council to run a 6-month trial connecting the 14th Street Pier in West Vancouver and Coal Harbour with a 15-minute ferry trip.
