= English Bay Launch =

Water taxi in British Columbia, Canada

English Bay Launch is a privately owned and operated water taxi service in the Lower Mainland, British Columbia, Canada, which replaced Granville Island Water Taxi Services in 2009. It is one of three water taxi services connecting Bowen Island to Vancouver with regularly scheduled service. It operates an enclosed 27-foot Eagle Craft vessel named The Eagle 14. Passengers are allowed to bring bicycles on board.

== Stops ==
Regularly scheduled routes operate between stops at the following locations:

- Granville Island
- Coal Harbour
- Snug Cove

== See also ==
- Aquabus
- False Creek Ferries
