= Aquabus =

Ferry service in British Columbia, Canada

- Locale: Granville Island, Vancouver
- Waterway: False Creek
- Transit type: Passenger ferry Water taxi
- Owner: Aquabus Ferries Ltd.
- Operator: Aquabus
- Began operation: 1985
- No. of vessels: 18
- No. of terminals: 8
- Website: theaquabus.com

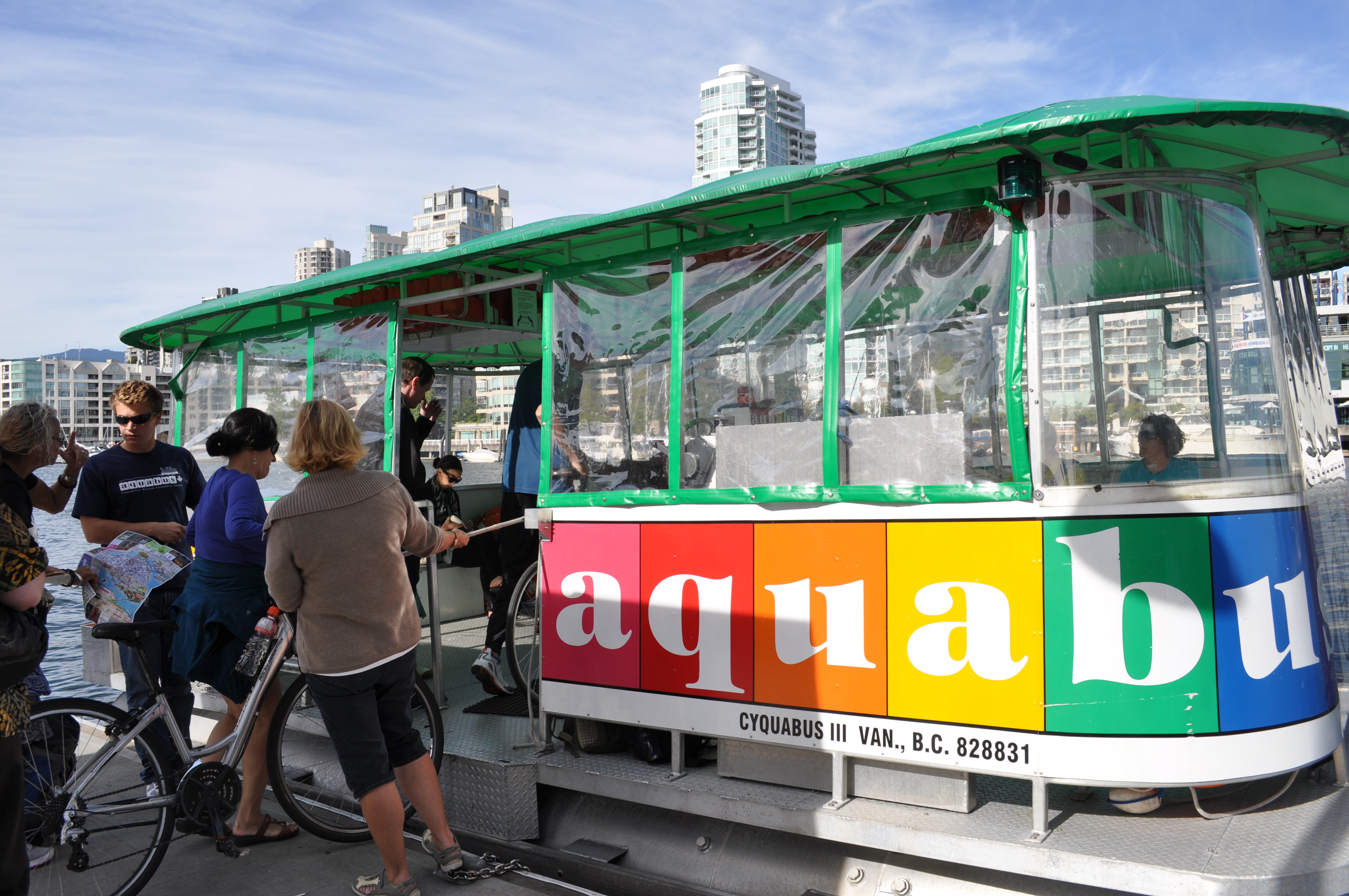
Aquabus boarding at Granville Island

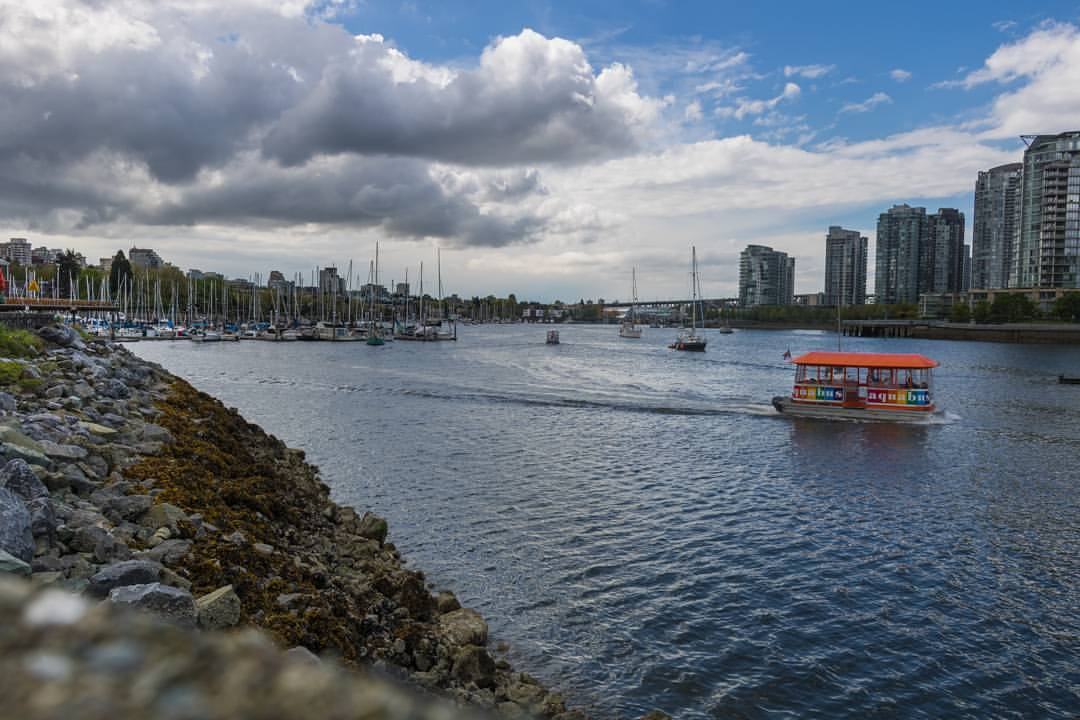
Aquabus sailing through False Creek

The Aquabus, also known as Aquabus Ferries Ltd., is a privately owned and operated ferry service that provides commuter and sightseeing services to locations all along False Creek of central Vancouver, British Columbia, Canada. The Aquabus started service in 1985.

As of 2026 the service calls at eight docks between Hornby Street and False Creek South.

== History ==
The beginning of ferry service throughout False Creek occurred in mid-1979 when Brian and Laura Beesley began operating a tour and water taxi service around Granville Island and False Creek. The Aquabus Ferry Company was formed in 1986 by Jeff Pratt, the son of George Pratt who was a former partner at competitor Granville Island Ferries division False Creek Ferries. It has since grown along with the population surrounding False Creek. Four Benford-designed ferries were in operation by Expo 86 and the additional three plus a bicycle ferry, Cyquabus I, were in service by 1995. The heritage ferry, the Rainbow Hunter, was built in 1950. As Vancouver grew, Aquabus incorporated two more larger bicycle ferries, the Cyquabus II and the Cyquabus III, in 2003 and 2006. In mid-2008, one of the Benford ferries was converted to a fully electric propulsion system and was used as a test platform for Aquabus' exploration of alternative energy. In the second quarter of 2010, the Aquabus Ferry Company acquired two new bicycle ferries, Cyquabus IV and Cyquabus V, and sold the heritage Rainbow Hunter.

== Fleet ==
The Aquabus fleet comprises eleven fully accessible vessels and seven vessels of the traditional Benford design used on False Creek.

The accessible vessels accommodate bicycles, strollers, wheelchairs, and walk-on passengers. The Benford vessels are smaller craft designed for by naval architect Jay Benford; four were in service by Expo 86.

== Stops and routes ==
Aquabus operates a water-taxi-style service on False Creek between eight numbered docks. Unlike the competing False Creek Ferries network, Aquabus does not publish separate colour-coded route lines; vessels call at all stops on the creek and passengers board at the nearest dock.

Granville Island (Dock 2) is the central transfer point on the network.

=== Stops ===
The Aquabus makes these scheduled stops:

Dock	Stop	Location
1	Hornby Street	South foot of Hornby Street
2	Granville Island	Next to the Arts Club Theatre
3	David Lam Park	At Homer Street, Yaletown
4	Stamp's Landing	Near Leg-in-Boot Square
5	Spyglass Place	Olympic Village, south shore beneath the Cambie Bridge
6	Yaletown	Foot of Davie Street
7	Plaza of Nations	Across from BC Place
8	The Village	False Creek South, near the pedestrian approach to BC Place and Science World

== See also ==
- English Bay Launch – operates water taxis from Granville Island
