= False Creek Ferries =

Ferry service in British Columbia, Canada

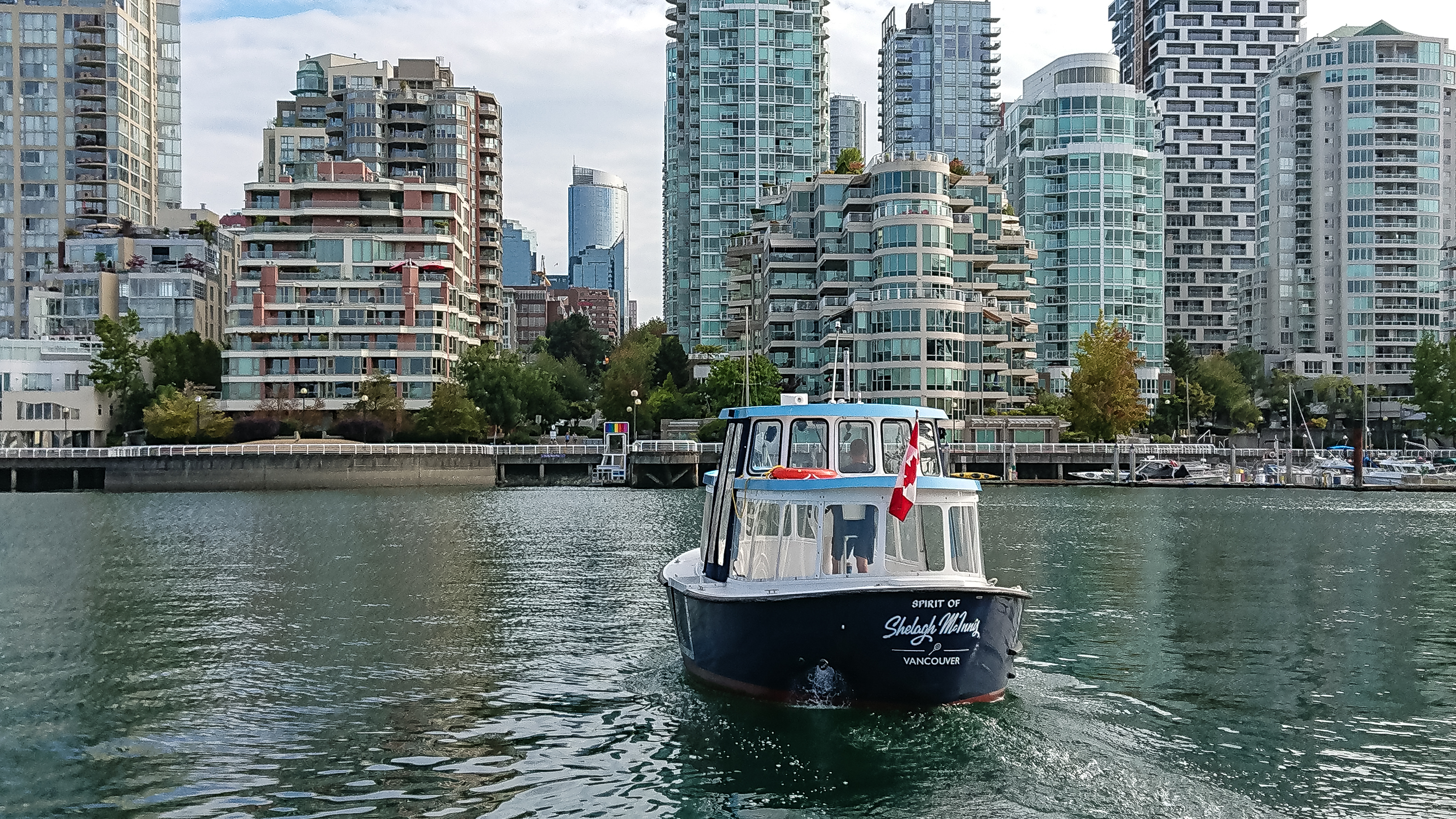
- Locale: Granville Island, Vancouver
- Waterway: False Creek, English Bay
- Transit type: Passenger ferry Water taxi
- Owner: Granville Island Ferries Ltd.
- Operator: False Creek Ferries
- Began operation: 1982
- System length: 2.1 nmi (3.9 km)
- No. of lines: 3
- No. of vessels: 19
- No. of terminals: 9
- Website: granvilleislandferries.bc.ca

The False Creek Ferries are a passenger ferry service connecting nine stops along False Creek in Vancouver, British Columbia, Canada, operated by Granville Island Ferries Ltd. The service is part of the transportation infrastructure of the metro core of Vancouver, connecting Granville Island with high-density residential locations along False Creek, including Sunset Beach (West End), Kitsilano, Yaletown, and the former 2010 Olympic Village. The ferries are part of the broader public transit landscape in Vancouver, though they are privately owned, and operate independently from TransLink, the regional transportation authority.

== History ==
Ferry service on False Creek was established in 1981 by Brian and Laura Beesley from Granville Island using four electric ferries. The ferries were 18 feet long and powered by 36 volt electric motors. Six, 6 volt rechargeable deep cycle batteries supplied the fuel. They were originally named after the Beesley's relatives: Alice May, Iris Maud, Nora Eileen and Juanita Dee. Although the original fleet has since been removed from regular service, three have found new life in differing capacities. The Alice May was renamed the Shelagh Mary and remains in the False Creek Ferries fleet as a crew launch. The Juanita Dee was sold & now operates out of the Ganges Marina on Saltspring Island as "The Queen of De Nile". The Iris Maud has been completely rebuilt and is now the private steam launch "Crouton" in Kelowna, BC.

In 1982, False Creek Ferry Ltd was sold to George McInnis and George Pratt who incorporated the company as Granville Island Ferries Ltd and operated it as False Creek Ferries. The company began operations at the Aquatic Centre dock in the West End on August 1, 1983 with two newly commissioned 12-passenger ferries, "Spirit of False Creek 1" and "Spirit of False Creek 2", which were built using designs by Jay Benford. These were the first two vessels of Benford's Spirit class. In 1984 the "Tymac II" was leased by False Creek Ferries for the newly created Maritime Museum run to Kitsilano pending completion of the remaining three Spirit class ferries, "Spirit of False Creek 3", "Spirit of False Creek 4" and "Spirit of False Creek 5".

Granville Island Ferries Ltd. was founded by George McInnis, with George Pratt as a partner. In the winter of 1985, Pratt left the company. Following that departure, his son Geoff Pratt incorporated a competing company, Aquabus Ferries Ltd, in June of 1985 using the same False Creek Ferry design.

== Fleet ==
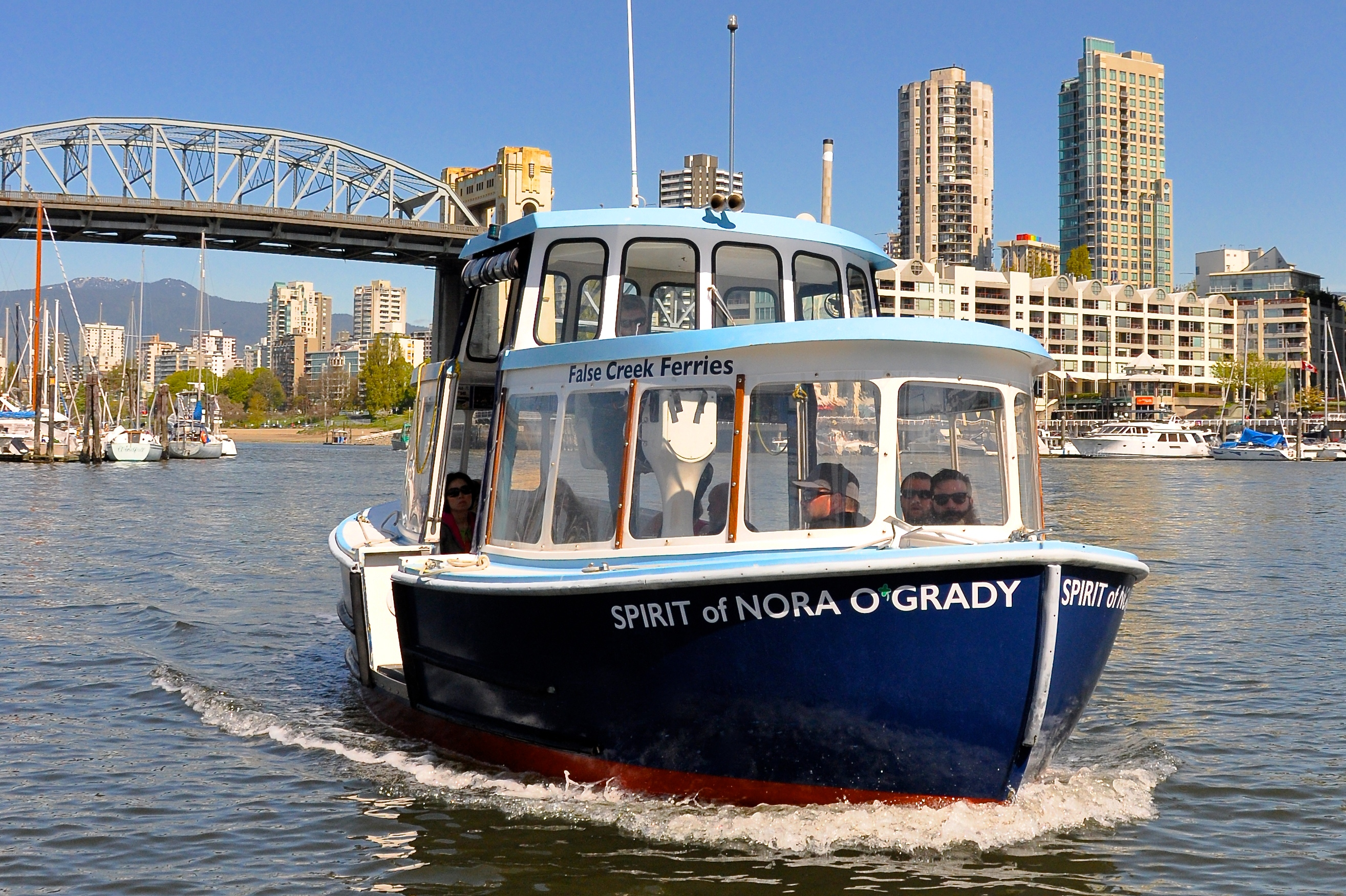
Spirit of False Creek 5

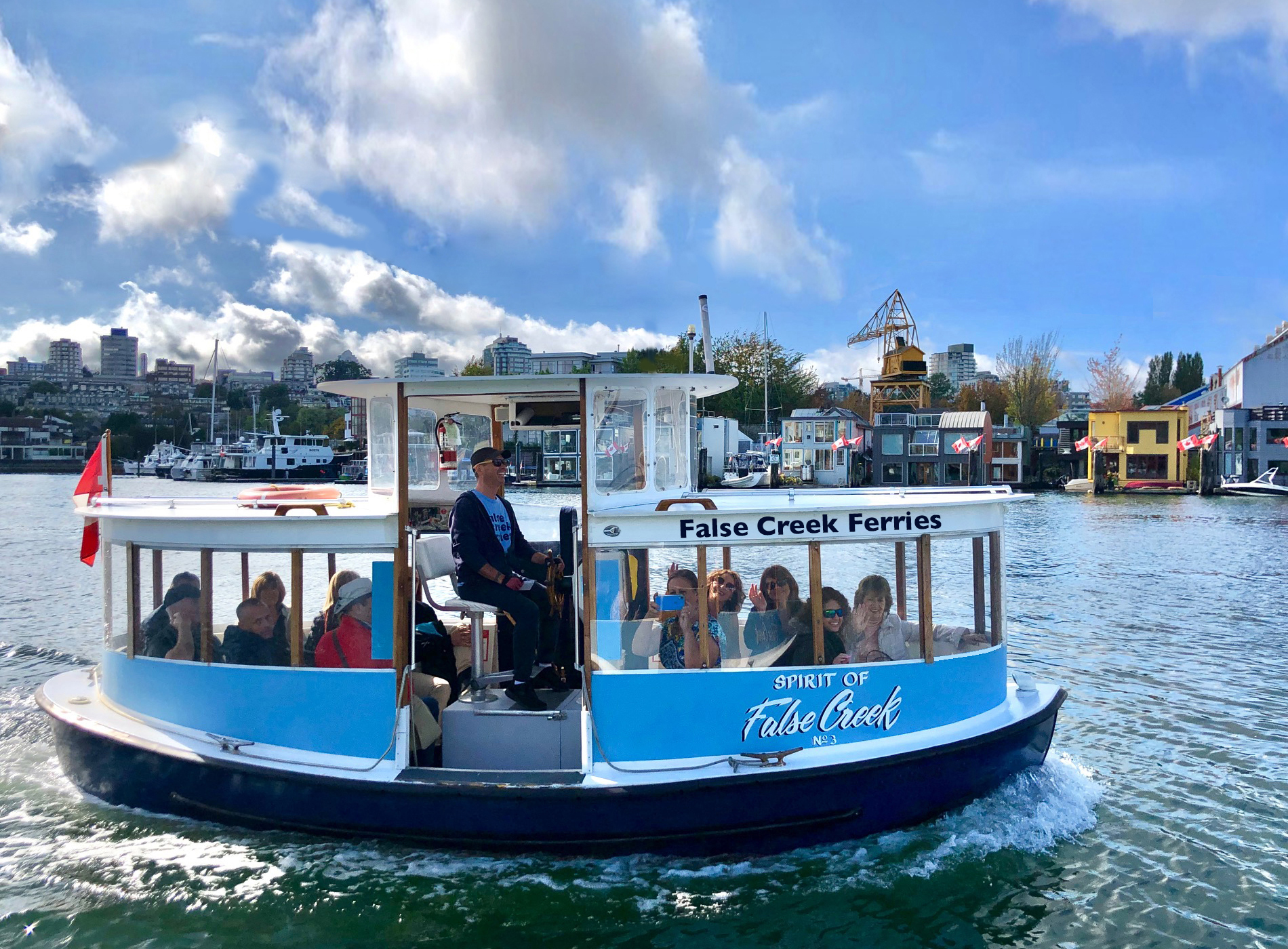
Spirit of False Creek 3

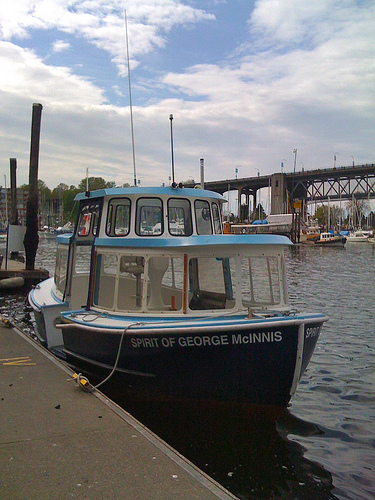
Spirit of George McInnis

- The "Spirit Class" comprises seven 12-passenger ferries designed by marine architect Jay Benford expressly for False Creek Ferries. Each vessel is 20 feet long, with a beam of eight feet, and draws two feet of water. Their maximum speed is about six knots. The first of the class, "Spirit of False Creek 1", was launched in 1982, followed closely by her first sister ship, "Spirit of False Creek 2", both built by Paul Miller in Coal Harbour. "Spirit of False Creek" 3, 4 & 5 were built by Independent Shipyards in Coombs, BC. "Spirit of Cindy Lee" and "Spirit of Lil Bood" were built in Port Hueneme, California.
  - Spirit of False Creek 1
  - Spirit of False Creek 2
  - Spirit of False Creek 3
  - Spirit of False Creek 4
  - Spirit of False Creek 5
  - Spirit of Cindy Lee
  - Spirit of Lil Bood
- The "Balfry Class" ferries are essentially enlarged versions of the Spirit class ferries. "Spirit of Cy Balfry", "Spirit of Nora O'Grady", "Spirit of George McInnis", and "TootSea" were built in 1989 in Port Hueneme, California by marine architect Bob Lyon at Harbour Hopper Ferries. "Spirit of False Creek 10" was built in Richmond, BC in 2002. The two most recent additions to the fleet, "Spirit of Shelagh McInnis" and "Spirit of False Creek XVII", were built in 2018 by West Bay Marine of Delta, BC.
  - Spirit of Cy Balfry
  - Spirit of Nora O'Grady
  - Spirit of George McInnis
  - Spirit of False Creek 10
  - TootSea
  - Spirit of Shelagh McInnis
  - Spirit of False Creek XVII
- The remaining three vessels in the fleet are open-deck boats referred to as "Novel Class": the converted commercial lifeboat "Spirit of Ned"; and the two converted Canadian Navy lifeboats "Stanley 1" and "Stanley 2".
  - Spirit of Ned
  - Stanley 1
  - Stanley 2
- While no longer on the active roster, the "Shelagh Mary", one of the original electric boats, is retained as a crew launch and heritage vessel.

== Stops and routes ==
Line	Route	Peak departure frequency	Off-peak departure frequency
1	Aquatic Centre — Granville Island	2 minutes	5 minutes
2	Granville Island — Kitsilano/Maritime Museum	10 minutes	15 minutes
3	Granville Island — Olympic Village/Science World	7 minutes	15 minutes

Routes operate between the following locations:

- Granville Island
- Aquatic Centre - at Sunset Beach on English Bay near Thurlow Street at Beach Avenue in the West End
- Maritime Museum - at Vanier Park in Kitsilano
- Yaletown Quayside Marina - at Davie Street and Marinaside Crescent
- David Lam Park - in Yaletown at the foot of Homer Street.
- Stamp's Landing - near Monk McQueens restaurant and Leg-in-Boot Square
- Spyglass Place - near the Olympic Village beneath the Cambie Street Bridge on the south shore
- Plaza of Nations - across from BC Place
- Olympic Village/Science World - near the SkyTrain Main Street-Science World Station in front of Creekside Community Centre

The stops are served by three routes. Passengers wishing to use multiple routes may purchase a through fare for transferring at either the Granville Island or Aquatic Centre hubs.

- Blue Line (Granville Island - Aquatic Centre)
- Yellow Line (Granville Island - Aquatic Centre - Maritime Museum)
- Red Line (Granville Island - David Lam Park - Stamp's Landing - Spyglass - Yaletown - Plaza of Nations - Olympic Village/Science World)

== See also ==
- The Aquabus - operates passenger ferries from Granville Island
- English Bay Launch - operates water taxis from Granville Island
