= Downtown Vancouver =

- City centre
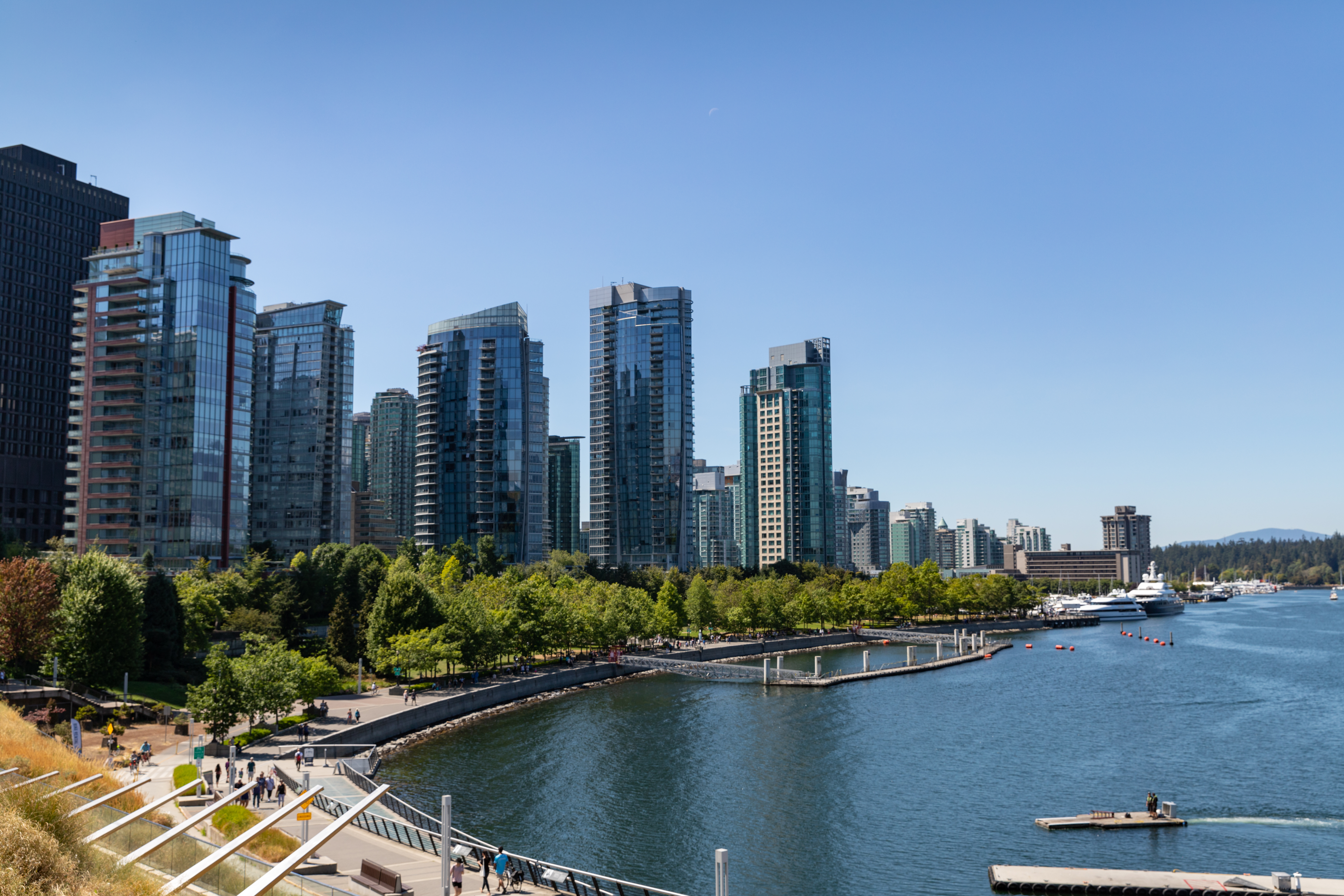
- High-rise towers in Coal Harbour

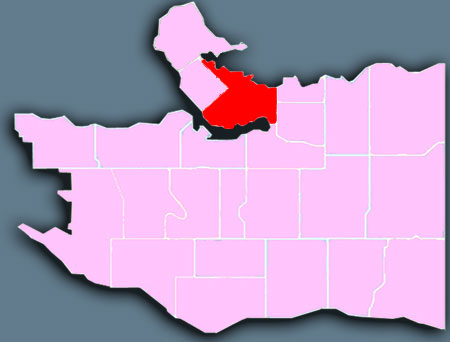
- Location of Downtown Vancouver shown in red
- Coordinates: 49°17′03″N 123°07′16″W
- Country: Canada
- Province: British Columbia
- City: Vancouver
- Communities: List of Communities: Chinatown; Coal Harbour; Gastown; Yaletown; West End

Area
  - Total: 3.7 km^{2} (1.4 sq mi)

Population
  - Total: 121,932
  - Density: 16,764/km^{2} (43,420/sq mi)
- Website: vancouver.ca/news-calendar/downtown.aspx

Downtown Vancouver is the city centre of Vancouver, British Columbia, Canada. Situated on the northwestern shore of the Burrard Peninsula in the Lower Mainland region, it occupies most of the north shore of the False Creek inlet, which cuts into the Burrard Peninsula creating the Downtown Peninsula, where the West End and Stanley Park are located.

Along with the West End, Stanley Park and the nearby Downtown Eastside, Downtown makes up Central Vancouver, one of the city's three main areas (the others being East Vancouver and the West Side).

With a disproportionately large amount of residential towers for a geographically constrained area, Downtown Vancouver is one of the densest areas in the country.

== Geography ==
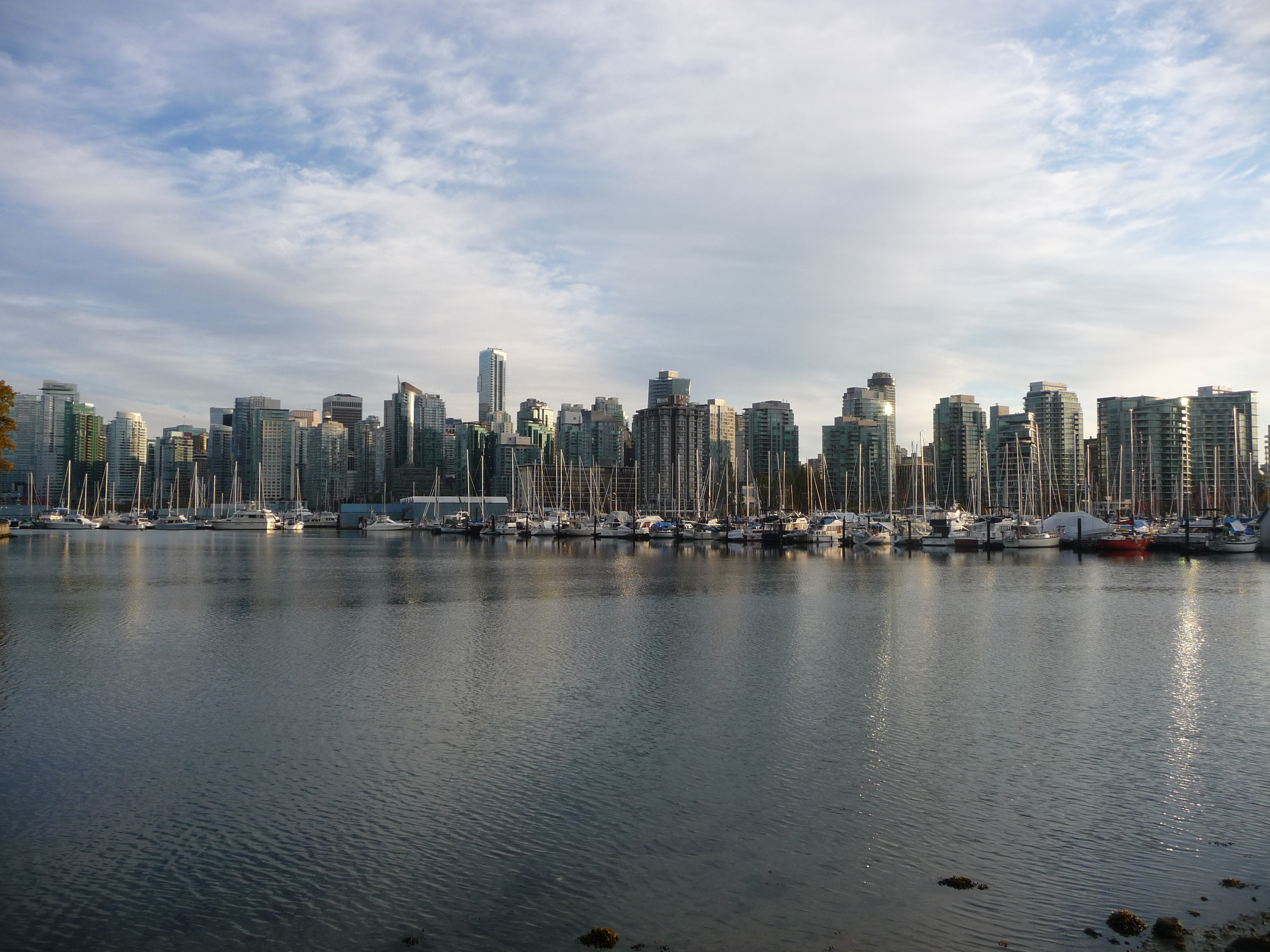
Downtown Vancouver is bounded by Burrard Inlet to the north.

The Downtown area is officially considered to be bounded by Burrard Inlet to the north, the West End to the west, Granville Island / Fairview and Mount Pleasant across the False Creek to the south, and the Downtown Eastside and Strathcona to the east and southeast. Most unofficial sources also include the West End and Stanley Park in Downtown (the so-called "Downtown Peninsula"), but the City of Vancouver officially defines them as separate neighbourhoods.

Besides the readily identifiable office towers of the financial and central business districts, Downtown Vancouver also includes residential neighbourhoods in the form of high-rise apartments and condominiums in Yaletown and Coal Harbour, and other Downtown neighbourhoods include the Granville Mall and Entertainment District, Downtown South, Gastown, Chinatown and Japantown.

=== Notable sub-neighbourhoods ===
- Yaletown is a heritage area of Downtown, located along False Creek and the seawall. Formerly home to the Vancouver's warehouses, the area has been revitalized with commercial and residential developments, and is now home to an upper middle class with a mix of condominiums and apartments.
- Coal Harbour is the Vancouver's former port area. Like Yaletown, the area has been redeveloped for residences and some business, and is now home to high-income residents.
- Gastown is another heritage area of the city. Tourist shops are found near the notable Gastown steam clock. The area is mixed with lower- and middle class residents living in apartments, condominiums and lofts.
- Chinatown is where many Chinese immigrants established their homes and businesses when they first moved to Vancouver. Residential areas are home to low-income residents in apartments. There are some warehouses still located in the area.
- Crosstown is a roughly four-block area at the western edge of Chinatown, east of Yaletown and south of Gastown, connecting these three neighbourhoods. It is a compact, high-density neighborhood including high-end heritage buildings (include the historic Sun Tower), a row of heritage high-rise boutique loft conversions along Beatty Street, and nine mixed-use residential condominium towers, all with easy access to major amenities of Downtown either by foot, SkyTrain or SeaBus. As one of the fastest-growing area of Downtown with an influx of new investments and businesses, the neighbourhood offers parks, traditional restaurants, coffee/tea shops, outdoor markets, clothing and many more retail shops.
- Japantown was an old neighbourhood located east of Gastown that once had a notable concentration of Japanese immigrants. It ceased to be a distinctly ethnic Japanese area during World War II when Japanese Canadians were interned and had their properties permanently confiscated by the King government, and although some Japanese returned after the war, the community never revived to the original state. As the Japantown ceased to exist, the area is now often marketed as Railtown by real estate developers due to the proximity of the West Coast Express railways.

== Demographics ==
Panethnic groups in the Downtown Vancouver neighbourhood (2001−2016)
Panethnic group	2016		2006		2001	
Panethnic group	Pop.	%	Pop.	%	Pop.	%
European (Note: Statistic includes all persons that did not make up part of a visible minority or an indigenous identity.)	31,730	53.91%	24,665	57.93%	16,940	61.11%
East Asian (Note: Statistic includes total responses of "Chinese", "Korean", and "Japanese" under visible minority section on census.)	13,225	22.47%	9,905	23.26%	6,720	24.24%
Middle Eastern (Note: Statistic includes total responses of "West Asian" and "Arab" under visible minority section on census.)	4,475	7.6%	2,245	5.27%	640	2.31%
South Asian	2,610	4.43%	1,130	2.65%	650	2.34%
Southeast Asian (Note: Statistic includes total responses of "Filipino" and "Southeast Asian" under visible minority section on census.)	1,980	3.36%	1,245	2.92%	610	2.2%
Indigenous	1,430	2.43%	1,380	3.24%	1,150	4.15%
Latin American	1,585	2.69%	750	1.76%	495	1.79%
African	655	1.11%	615	1.44%	310	1.12%
Other/Multiracial (Note: Statistic includes total responses of "Visible minority, n.i.e." and "Multiple visible minorities" under visible minority section on census.)	1,160	1.97%	650	1.53%	200	0.72%
Total responses	58,855	94.88%	42,580	98.08%	27,720	99.04%
Total population	62,030	100%	43,415	100%	27,990	100%
Note: Totals greater than 100% due to multiple origin responses

== Architecture ==
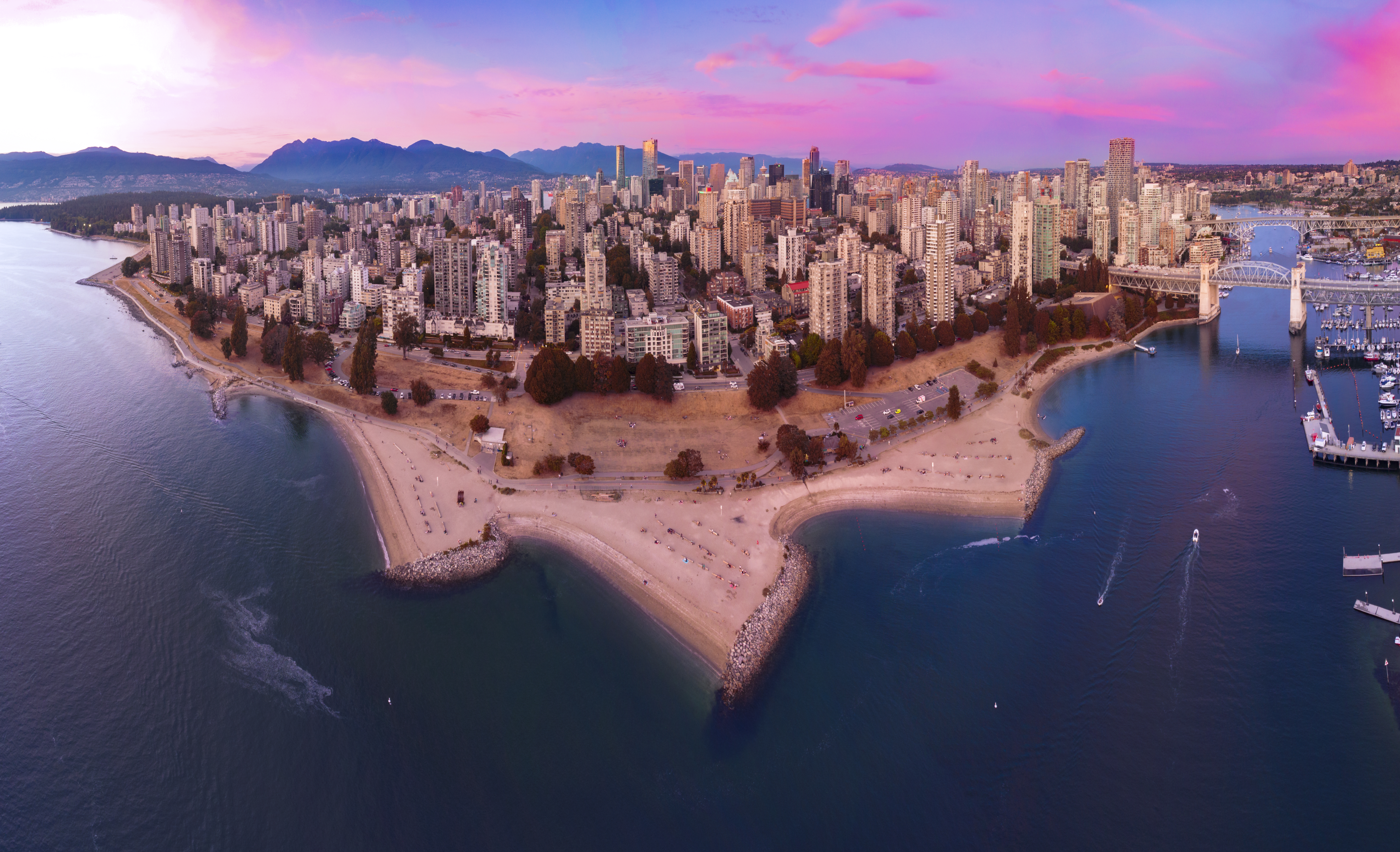
Sunset over Downtown Vancouver

The downtown area includes most of the remaining historic buildings and many of the larger notable buildings in the region. All but one of Vancouver's tallest buildings are located within Downtown Vancouver, the one being Marine Gateway North located next to Marine Drive station.

=== Sports ===
There are two major sporting facilities in the downtown core, Rogers Arena (formerly GM Place) and BC Place Stadium. The NHL's Vancouver Canucks play at Rogers Arena, while the CFL's BC Lions and MLS's Vancouver Whitecaps FC use the neighbouring BC Place Stadium. The SkyTrain's Stadium–Chinatown station provides easy rapid transit access to the district.

== Transportation ==
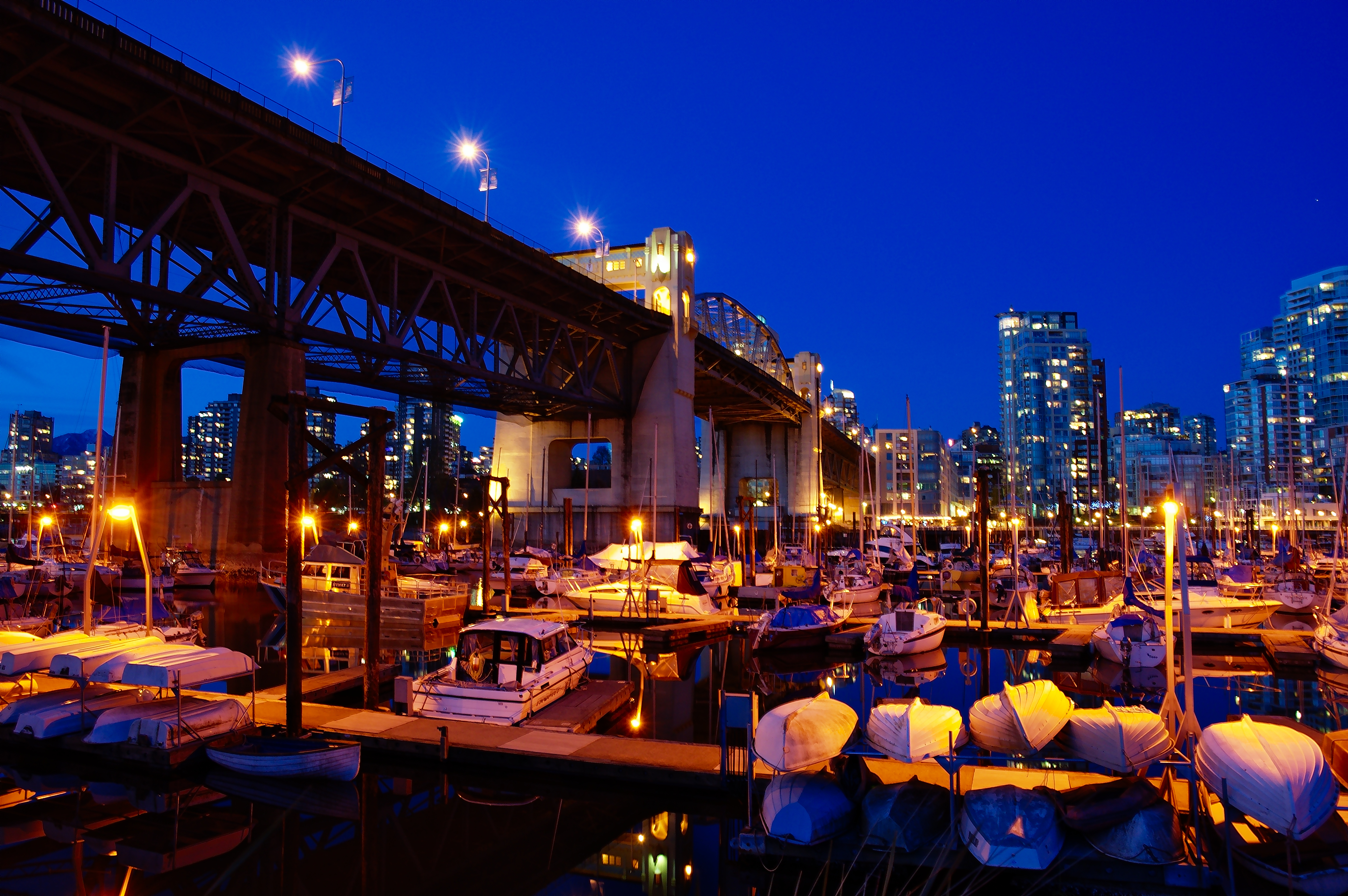
Burrard Street Bridge is a major bridge and access point to Downtown.

The presence of water on three sides limits access to downtown Vancouver. There are four major bridges: the Lions Gate Bridge – connecting to the North Shore municipalities and the Trans Canada Highway – and the Burrard Street Bridge, the Cambie Street Bridge, and the Granville Street Bridge that provide access to the commercial and residential areas south of False Creek.

The historic Waterfront station is the principal transit hub for the downtown core. There are six rapid transit stations located in downtown Vancouver running on two SkyTrain lines: the Expo Line and Canada Line. The Expo Line travels from Waterfront station at the foot of the central harbour and through Dunsmuir Tunnel to the east. The Canada Line travels from Waterfront station and tunnels south under Granville Street and Davie Street, linking downtown to central Richmond and Vancouver International Airport. SeaBus is a passenger-only ferry that connects from Waterfront station to the North Shore in 10 to 12 minutes. The West Coast Express commuter rail system travels from Waterfront station to the eastern suburbs and exurbs. The West Coast Express travels from Waterfront to Moody Centre, Coquitlam Central, Port Coquitlam, Pitt Meadows, Maple Meadows Station, Port Haney and Mission City as its terminus station Terminals are also available near Waterfront station for float planes and helicopters.

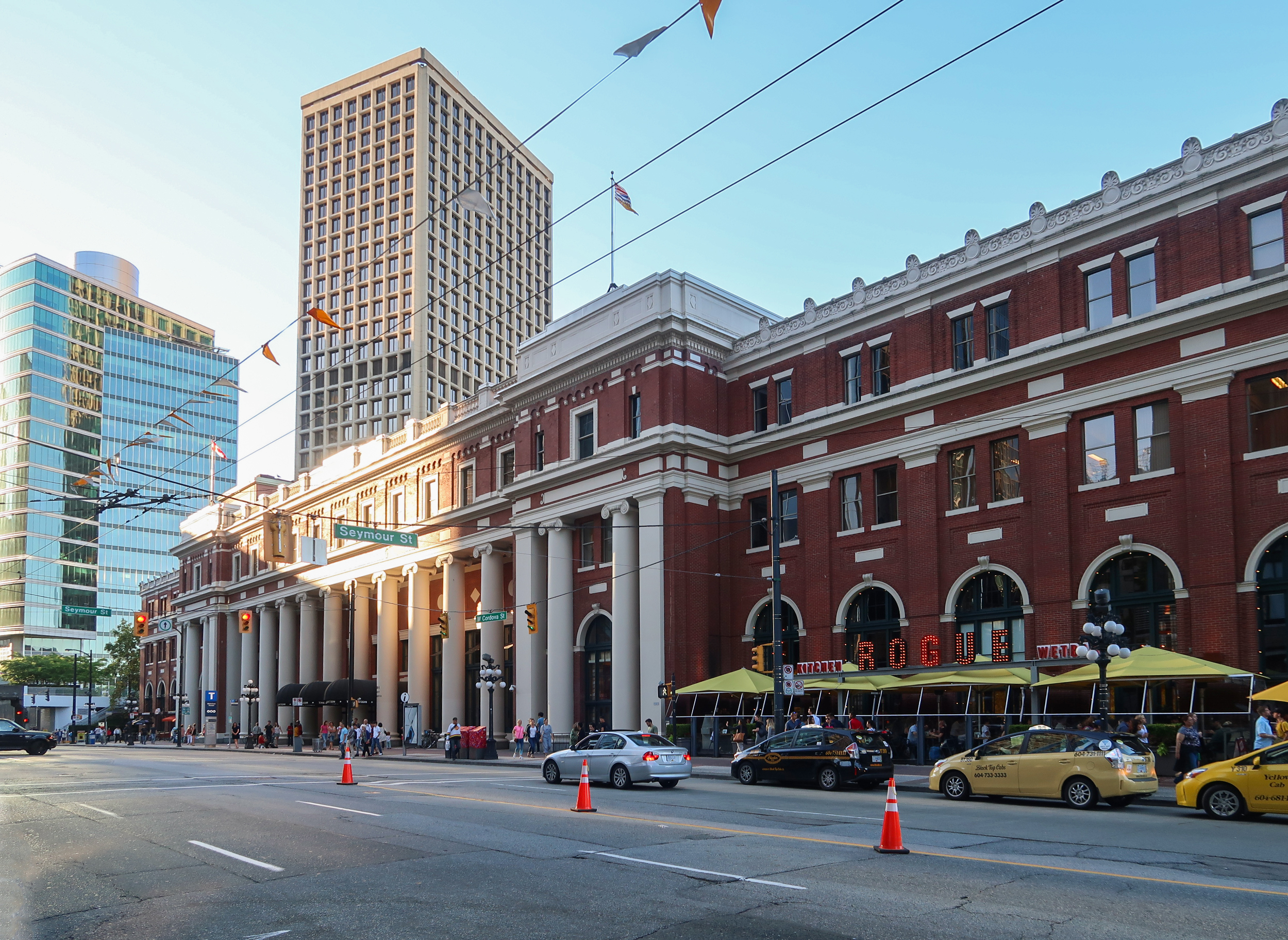
Waterfront station is a major intermodal public transportation hub in Downtown Vancouver.

Most north–south Vancouver bus routes serve Downtown Vancouver, in addition to suburban routes from the North Shore and Burnaby.

There are two private passenger water taxi operators (False Creek Ferries and the Aquabus), providing service between several downtown neighbourhoods, False Creek, and Granville Island.
