= List of neighbourhoods in Vancouver =

Vancouver is made up of a number of smaller neighbourhoods and communities with their own distinct cultures and histories. While there is some disagreement on all of the names and boundaries of these areas, the City of Vancouver officially divides the city into 22 neighbourhoods for administrative purposes.

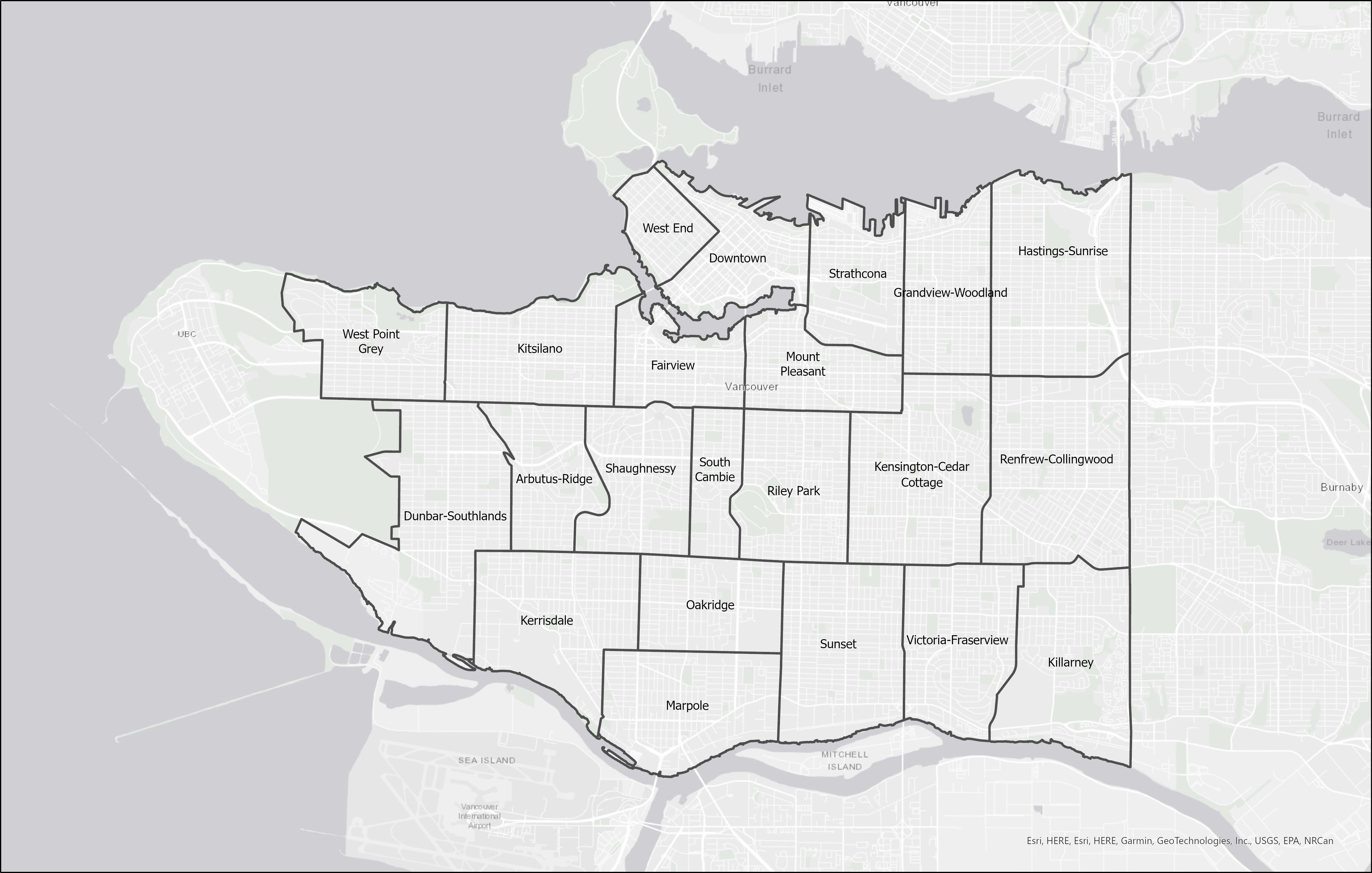
Neighbourhoods of Vancouver

== Official neighbourhoods ==
The City of Vancouver uses neighbourhood boundaries to break up the city's geographic area for delivering services and resources. The 22 official neighbourhoods are as follows:

- Arbutus Ridge - Located in the middle of Vancouver's west side, characterized by tree-lined streets and heritage homes with large lot sizes.
- Downtown - The Central business district of Vancouver, containing offices and popular entertainment venues as well as housing in the form of high-rises and apartments.
- Dunbar-Southlands - An affluent neighbourhood on the western side of the city, primarily containing single family dwellings. The neighbourhood also contains the Musqueam Indian Band Reserve #2.
- Fairview - Contains the popular attractions of Granville Island and the South Granville shopping district. The neighbourhood is also the location of the Vancouver General Hospital and contains many health-related institutions.
- Grandview-Woodland - A mature neighbourhood in east Vancouver that is a diverse mixture of commercial, industrial, single-family and multi-family residential dwellings with a rich ethnic history and features.
- Hastings-Sunrise - One of Vancouver's oldest neighbourhoods, it is mainly residential, with a dense strip of shops along Hastings Street. It is also known for being the home of Hastings Park and the Pacific National Exhibition.
- Kensington-Cedar Cottage - One of the most multicultural neighbourhoods in the city and located in the middle of east Vancouver. It is the location of Trout Lake and is also home to Little Saigon, a hub for Vancouver's Vietnamese-Canadian community.
- Kerrisdale - A primarily residential neighbourhood bisected by the Arbutus Greenway and containing the Kerrisdale Village shopping area.
- Killarney - Located in the southeastern corner of the city, it mostly contains single-family residences with a few multi-family homes as well as townhouses and high-rises in the recent Fraserlands development along the river.
- Kitsilano - Located along the south end of English Bay, the neighbourhood is known for its popular beaches.
- Marpole - The neighbourhood contains a diverse range of low-density to high-density residential and multiple commercial streets. It was once the site of a Musqueam village.
- Mount Pleasant - Known for its unusual stores, heritage buildings, artistic residents, and arts-focused festivals.
- Oakridge - Known for being the location of Oakridge Mall, the neighbourhood is mostly residential and is the hub of Vancouver's Jewish population.
- Renfrew-Collingwood - A large, primarily residential neighbourhood located in Vancouver's East side. There are many Filipino-Canadian businesses surrounding the Joyce-Collingwood Skytrain Station.
- Riley Park - Located in the centre of Vancouver and contains two shopping hubs, including many of the city's vintage and antique shops. The neighbourhood is home to the city's highest point at the top of Little Mountain.
- Shaughnessy - An affluent and mostly residential neighbourhood containing large detached homes and a large number of heritage homes from the first half of the 20th century.
- South Cambie - One of Vancouver's smallest neighbourhoods, it contains multiple medical facilities including BC Children's Hospital, BC Women's Hospital & Health Centre and Canadian Blood Services.
- Strathcona - One of the city's oldest neighbourhoods, containing a mix of houses and apartments. It has historically been the home to Vancouver's British, Irish, Russian, Croatian, Greeks, and Scandinavian, Japanese and Chinese populations.
- Sunset - An ethnically diverse, working-class neighbourhood filled with single family homes, low-rise apartments, and small retail shops. Home to Little India (Punjabi Market), it is the centre of Vancouver's Indo-Canadian population.
- Victoria-Fraserview - A multiculturally diverse neighbourhood with a large Chinese-Canadian population, it contains a mixture of retail and residential development. The south side was historically an industrial centre, but is currently being redeveloped into a residential neighbourhood.
- West End - English Bay and Stanley Park are located here. In addition, it is home to the city's historical gay community, the Davie Village.
- West Point Grey is a mixed commercial and residential area. Housing is a mix of single-detached homes and apartments.

== Other areas ==
There are other distinct areas of the city which do not have official neighbourhood status. These communities typically have distinct cultures and character, which differentiate them from their surrounding areas.

- Yaletown is a heritage area of the city. Formerly home to the city's warehouses, the area has been revitalized with commercial and residential developments. Home to an upper-middle class with a mix of condos and apartments. The area is located along False Creek and the seawall.
- Coal Harbour is the city's former port area. Like Yaletown, the area has been redeveloped for residences and some business. Home to high-income residents.
- Gastown is another heritage area of the city. Some streets are still cobblestone. Tourist shops are found near the notable Gastown Steam Clock. The area is mixed with low and middle class residents living in apartments, condos and lofts.
- Chinatown is another heritage area, where many Chinese immigrants established their homes and businesses when they first moved to Vancouver. Residential areas are home to low income residents in apartments. There are some warehouses still located in the area.
- Downtown Eastside is one of the oldest neighbourhoods in the city, and has recently struggled with social issues such as homelessness, drug use, unemployment, among others.
- Crosstown is a roughly four-block area that connects Chinatown, Vancouver, Gastown, and Yaletown/Stadium District. Notable landmarks include the historic Sun Tower and a row of heritage high-rise boutique loft conversions.
- False Creek

== See also ==
- Metro Vancouver
- West Vancouver
- North Vancouver
