= Seawall (Vancouver) =

Stone wall constructed around Stanley Park

Coordinates: 49.313398°N 123.145634°W

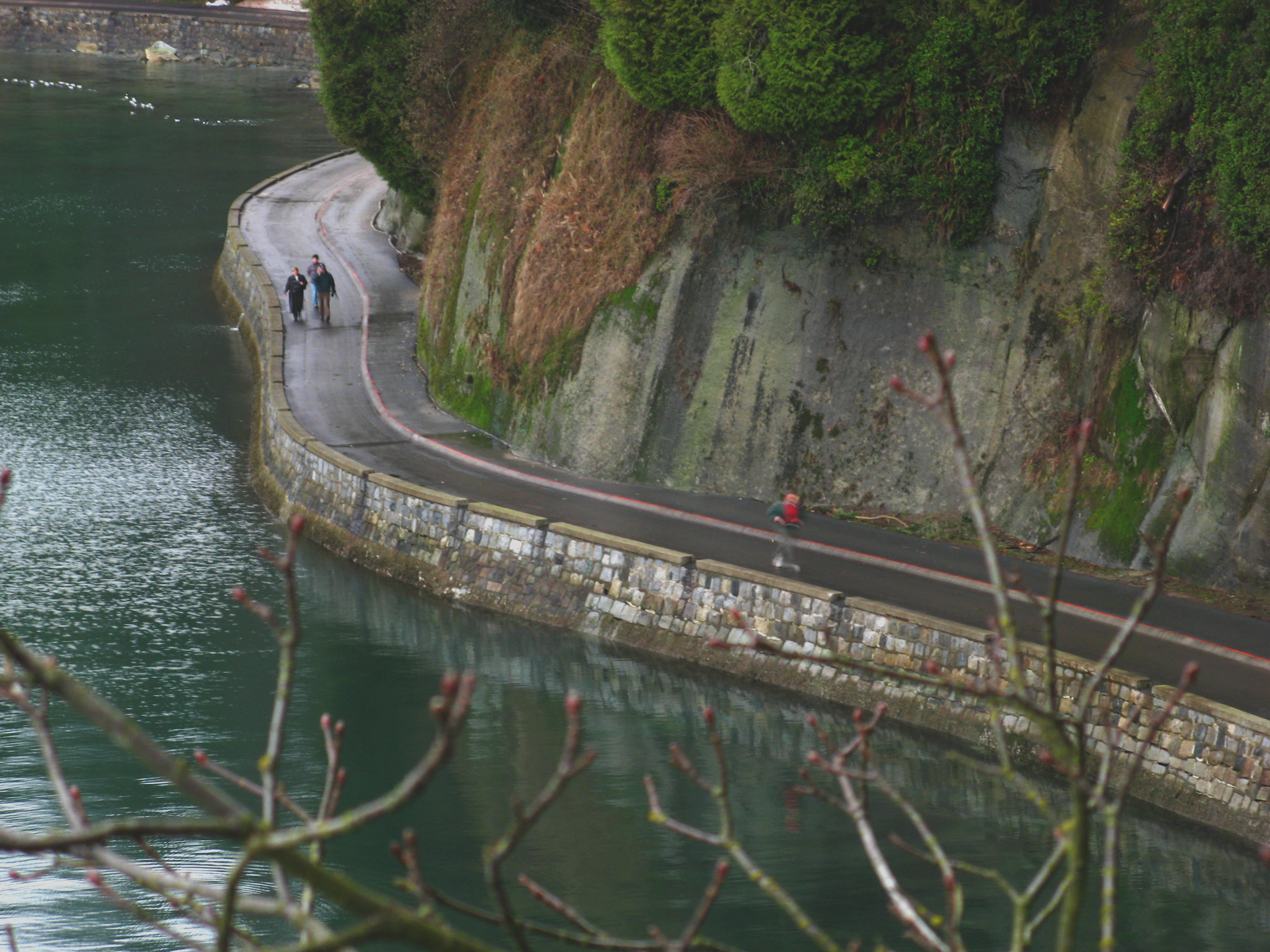
The seawall in Stanley Park

The seawall in Vancouver, British Columbia, Canada, is a stone wall that was constructed around the perimeter of Stanley Park to prevent erosion of the park's foreshore and is the world's longest uninterrupted waterfront path. Colloquially, the term also denotes the pedestrian, bicycle, and rollerblading pathway on the seawall, one which has been extended far outside the boundaries of Stanley Park and which has become one of the most-used features of the park by both locals and tourists.

While the whole path is not built upon the seawall, the total distance from CRAB park, around Stanley Park and False Creek to Spanish Banks is about 30 kilometres (19 mi).

Despite perennial conflicts between pedestrians, cyclists, and inline skaters, park users consider the seawall to be the most important feature of Stanley Park and it is the most used feature within the park.

== History ==
The original idea for the seawall is attributed to park board superintendent, W. S. Rawlings, who conveyed his vision in 1918:

It is not difficult to imagine what the realization of such an undertaking would mean to the attractions of the park and personally I doubt if there exists anywhere on this continent such possibilities of a combined park and marine walk as we have in Stanley Park.

The proposal was made to the federal government that it should help finance seawall construction because it owned the park and only leased the land to the city. It was argued that the waves created by ships passing through the First Narrows were eroding the area between Prospect Point and Brockton Point. On this basis, the federal government helped pay for the wall only until 1967 because the portions of the park vulnerable to erosion were now protected.

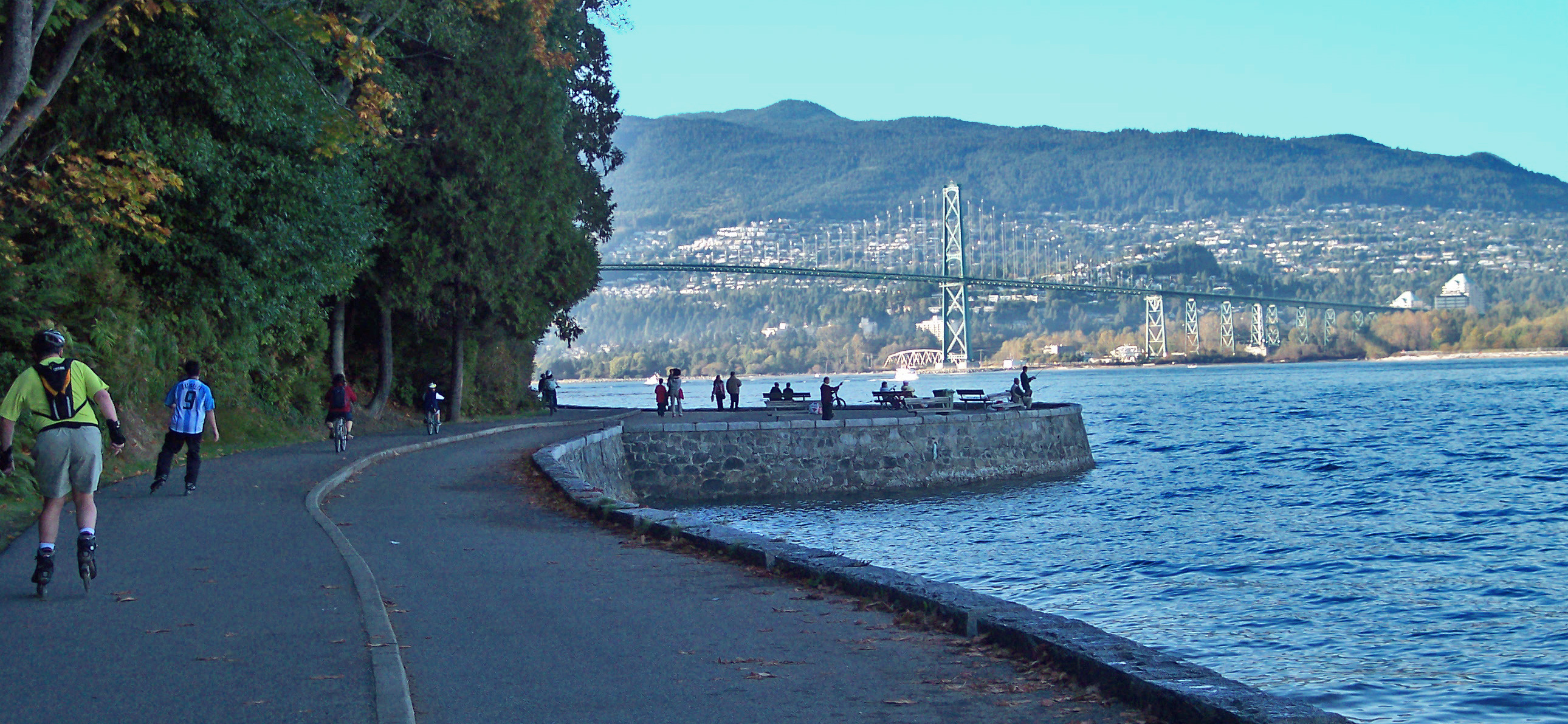
Park visitors walk, bike, roll, and fish on the seawall. The Lions Gate Bridge is in the background.

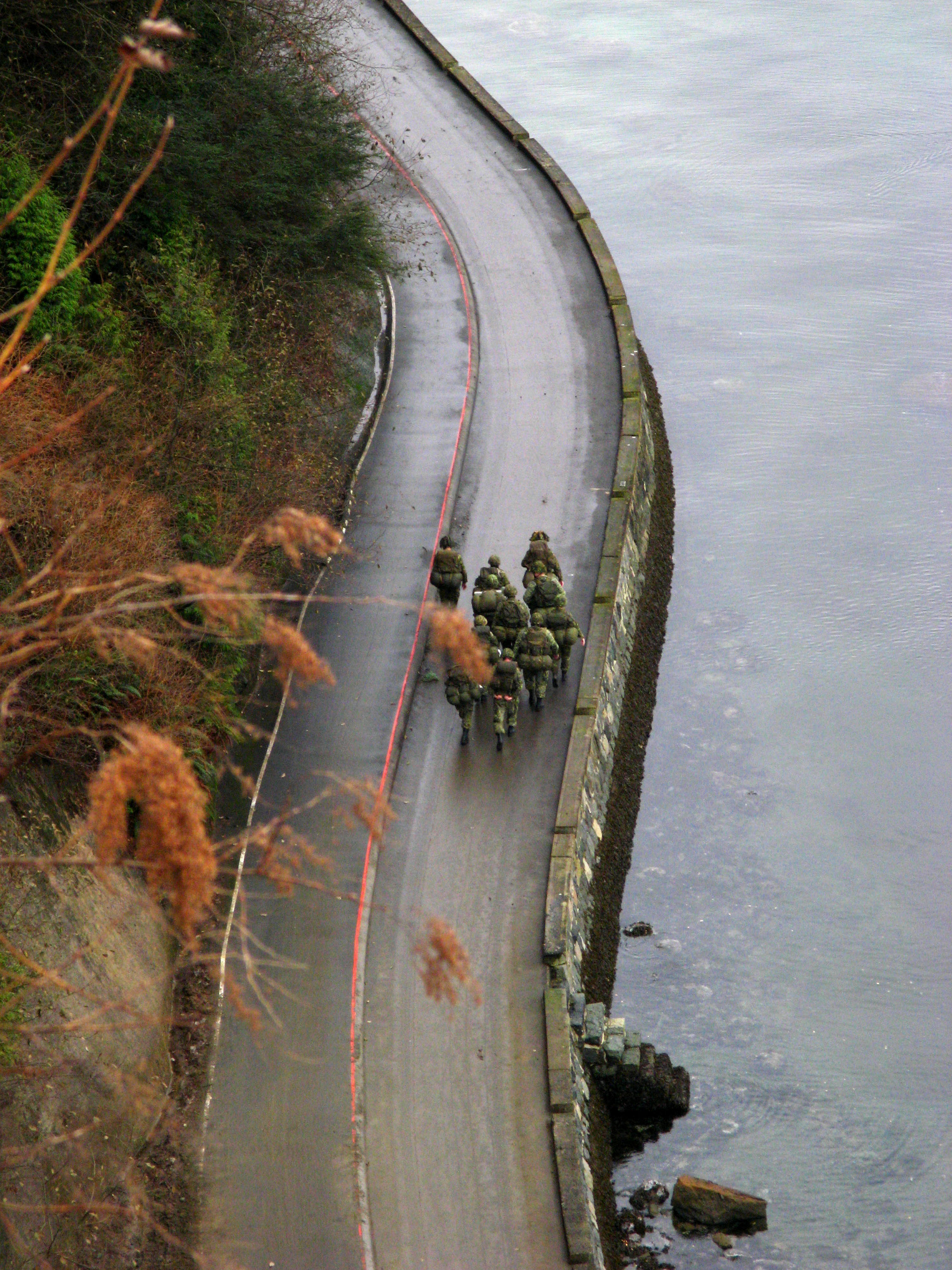
Reserve soldiers walking on the pedestrian side of the seawall, near Siwash Rock in Stanley Park.

Most of the Stanley Park portion of the wall was built between 1917 and 1971, although the park portion was not completed until 1980.

The viability of the wall continues to be under threat, as became apparent due to a king tide in January 2022. High waves together with debris destroyed part of the wall.

=== Construction ===
In contrast to the continuity during Cunningham's oversight of the project, construction of the seawall was intermittent, owing to the short-term funding commitments of the civic and federal governments. The first 4,000 feet (1,200 m) was completed between 1914 and 1916. A series of storms threatened the foreshore near Second Beach during the war, when water flooded the patch of land between the beach and Lost Lagoon. In 1920, the wall served as a workfare project for 2,300 unemployed men (the largest number of workers at any one time), and by 1939, an additional 8,000 feet (2,400 m) of the wall was finished. Another 9,100 feet (2,800 m) was built between 1950 and 1957, and the final 2,500 feet (760 m) was not taken on until 1968. On 26 September 1971, the last block, completing the original vision of the seawall, was tapped into place by H. H. Stevens, who also helped initiate the project in 1914 as a Member of Parliament for Vancouver. Others who laboured on the wall included unemployed relief workers again during the Great Depression, and seamen from HMCS Discovery on Deadman's Island facing punishment detail in the 1950s. Also in that decade, stone sets from the recently dismantled BC Electric Railway streetcar system were incorporated into the seawall. The original Stanley Park section of the 22 kilometres (14 mi) Vancouver Seawall is approximately 9 kilometres (5.6 mi) from Coal Harbour / Vancouver Rowing Club to Second Beach.

=== James Cunningham ===
James "Jimmy" Cunningham, a master stonemason, dedicated his life to the construction of the seawall from 1931 until his retirement. Even after he retired, Cunningham continued to return to monitor the wall's progress, until his death at 85. Cunningham continued supervising construction into his last days despite being ill and, on at least one occasion, went to check the seawall's progress still wearing pajamas. He died on 29 September 1963, long before the wall was finished, but remains the one most associated with the project, and a commemorative plaque can be found near Siwash Rock, where his ashes were also scattered.

== Seawall conflict ==
A protracted conflict between pedestrians and cyclists plagued the seawall for years. Strolling pedestrians took issue with cyclists speeding by, while cyclists felt they had a right to cycle the seawall. As traffic increased over time, collisions were becoming more frequent. Cycling on the seawall was consequently outlawed, and by 1976, the Vancouver Police Department had issued 3,000 tickets to offenders. A solution was proposed in 1977 by a Calgary-based group of charitable foundations. It offered to pay $900,000 to widen the path on the English Bay side to 6 metres (20 ft) in order to accommodate both cyclists and pedestrians on the condition that the city match that amount. The proposal triggered an outcry from environmentalist groups, such as the Save Our Parkland Association. City council nonetheless agreed to the plan, but conflict between user groups persisted. The issue was not resolved until 1984 when the bicycle lane of the seawall was designated one-way in a counterclockwise direction around the park, which it remains today. That resolution brought fewer accidents, but as late as 1993, proposals to ban cycling on the seawall continued to be put forth. The popularity of inline skating in the 1990s also contributed to the debate over seawall use, as well as skateboarders to a lesser extent, until users were divided into wheeled versus non-wheeled camps. It appears unlikely that a consensus will emerge over the most appropriate mode of travelling the seawall, but as long as accidents remain minimal, it is unlikely to re-emerge as a pressing park-use issue. A survey conducted for a 1992 task force on the park found that 65% of park users supported bicycle traffic on the seawall compared with 20% who favoured banning cyclists.

The seawall route has continued to expand, so that a continuous, mostly seaside, path for pedestrians, cyclists, and inline skaters now extends for a total of 22 kilometres (14 mi). Starting from Coal Harbour, it winds around Stanley Park, along Sunset Beach, around False Creek, past the Burrard Street Bridge, through Vanier Park, and finishes at Kitsilano Beach Park.
