= The Westin Bayshore =

Hotel in Vancouver, British Columbia

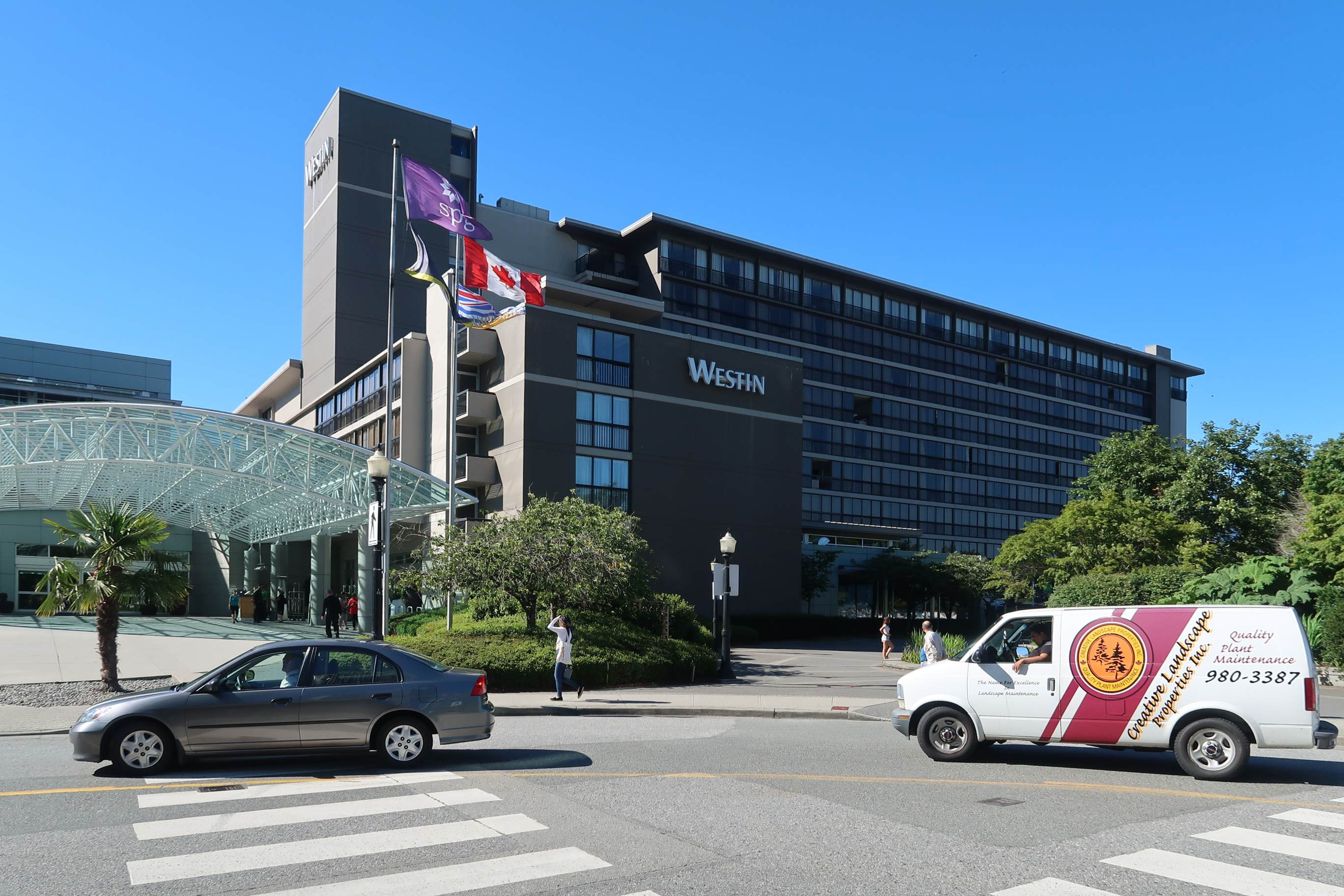
- The hotel's original 1961 wing

- Location within Downtown Vancouver (British Columbia)

General information
- Location: 1601 Bayshore Drive; Vancouver, British Columbia; V6G 2V4
- Coordinates: 49°17′35″N 123°7′46″W
- Opened: March 27, 1961

Design and construction
- Architect: Douglas C. Simpson

Website
- www.marriott.com/en-us/hotels/yvrwi-the-westin-bayshore-vancouver/overview/

The Westin Bayshore is a hotel overlooking Coal Harbour in Vancouver, British Columbia.

== Description ==
The hotel has 499 rooms in two buildings, a low-rise structure built in 1961 and a newer tower built in 1970.

== History ==
The Bayshore Inn was developed by local Vancouver businessmen Hugh Martin and Douglas Welch, through their Marwell Construction company. The site was previously tidal flats in Coal Harbour. Four and a half acres were reclaimed by dumping fill and sinking concrete piles 40 feet down to bedrock. Welch and Martin originally planned to build a motel on the site. However, when they partnered with Seattle-based Western Hotels, the chain's head, Edward Carlson, convinced them to build a full-service resort hotel. Marwell and Western shared the $6 million construction cost. The hotel was the first to be constructed from scratch by Western Hotels, which had previously built its business on assuming management of already operating hotels up and down the West Coast.

The 308-room hotel was designed by Vancouver architect Douglas C. Simpson in a T shape, with a low-rise four-story wing facing the street, and a taller eight-story wing jutting out towards the water. The Bayshore Inn opened on March 27, 1961. The chain became Western International Hotels in 1963. The tower wing was added in 1970.

On March 14, 1972, the world's most famous fugitive billionaire, Howard Hughes, moved into the hotel. The eccentric business magnate lived in the hotel's three-room, top-floor penthouse for 6 months, and was never seen outside of his room, despite the media's best attempts to photograph him.

The Bayshore Inn was renamed The Westin Bayshore when the hotel chain was renamed Westin Hotels in 1981.

The hotel complex was sold in November 2015 for $290 million, which represented the largest single-asset sale in Canada in 2015 and a record for a Vancouver hotel on both a per-key and gross-value basis.

The Canada men's national soccer team will be based out of the hotel for the duration of the 2026 FIFA World Cup.

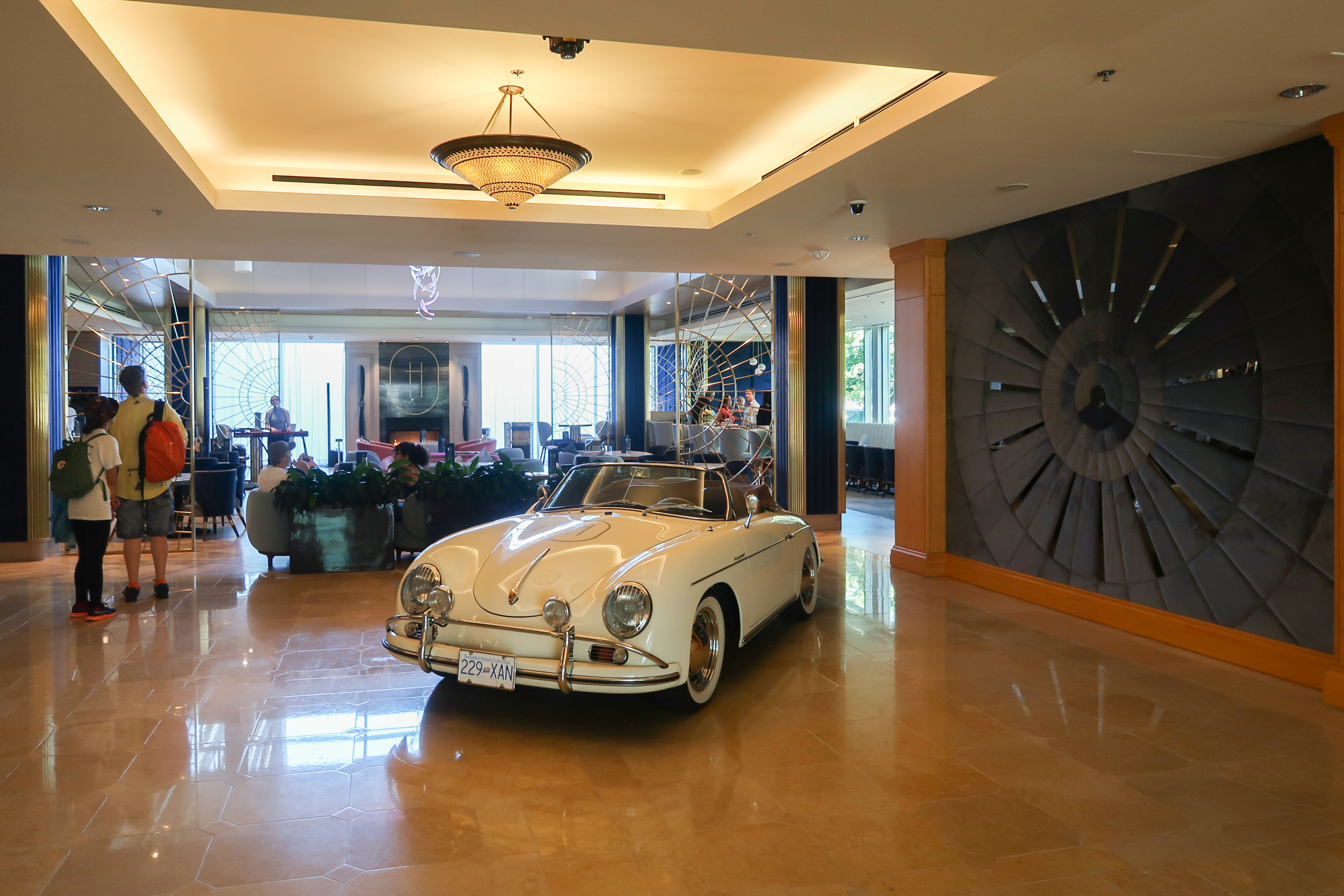
Lobby

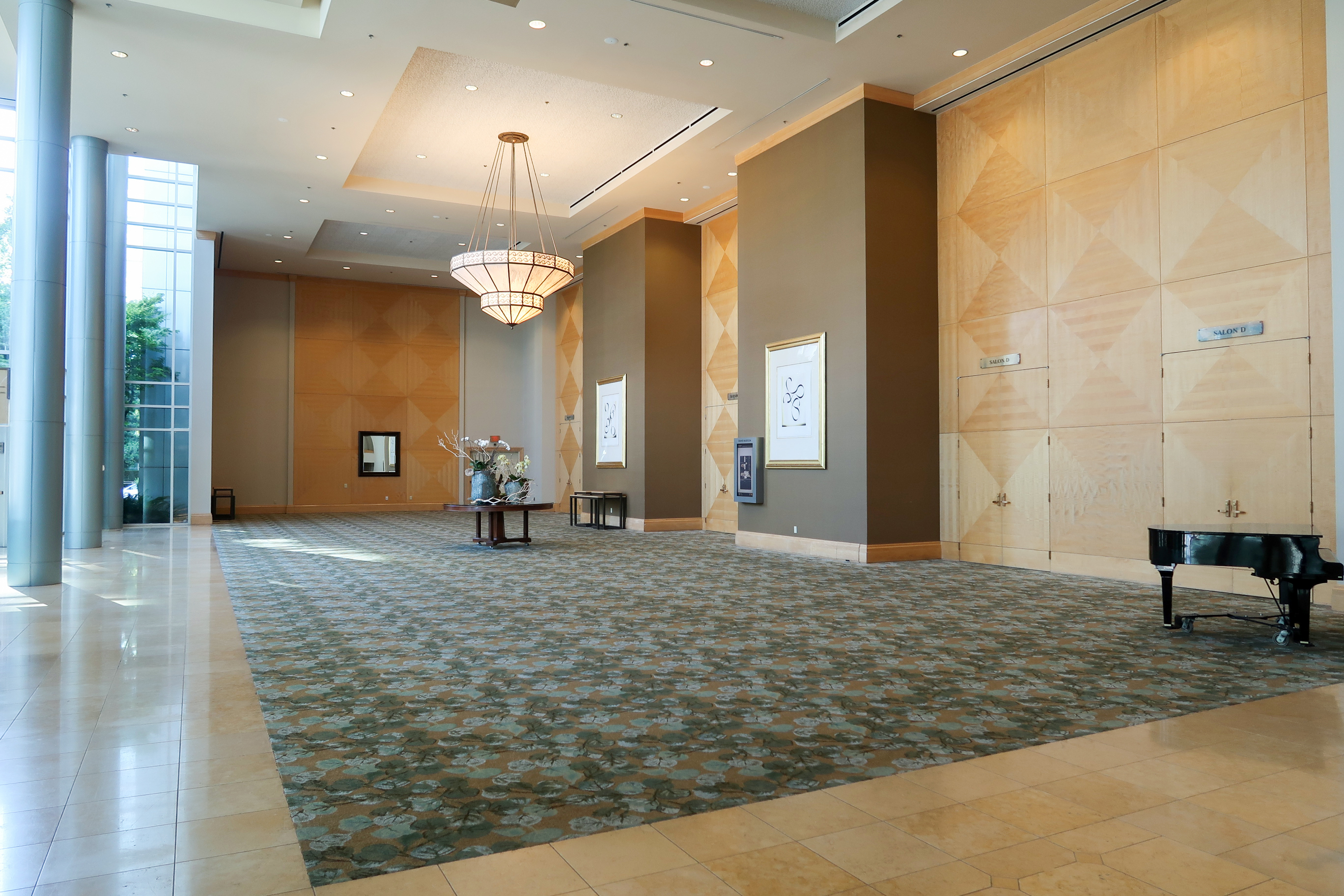
Ballroom front lobby

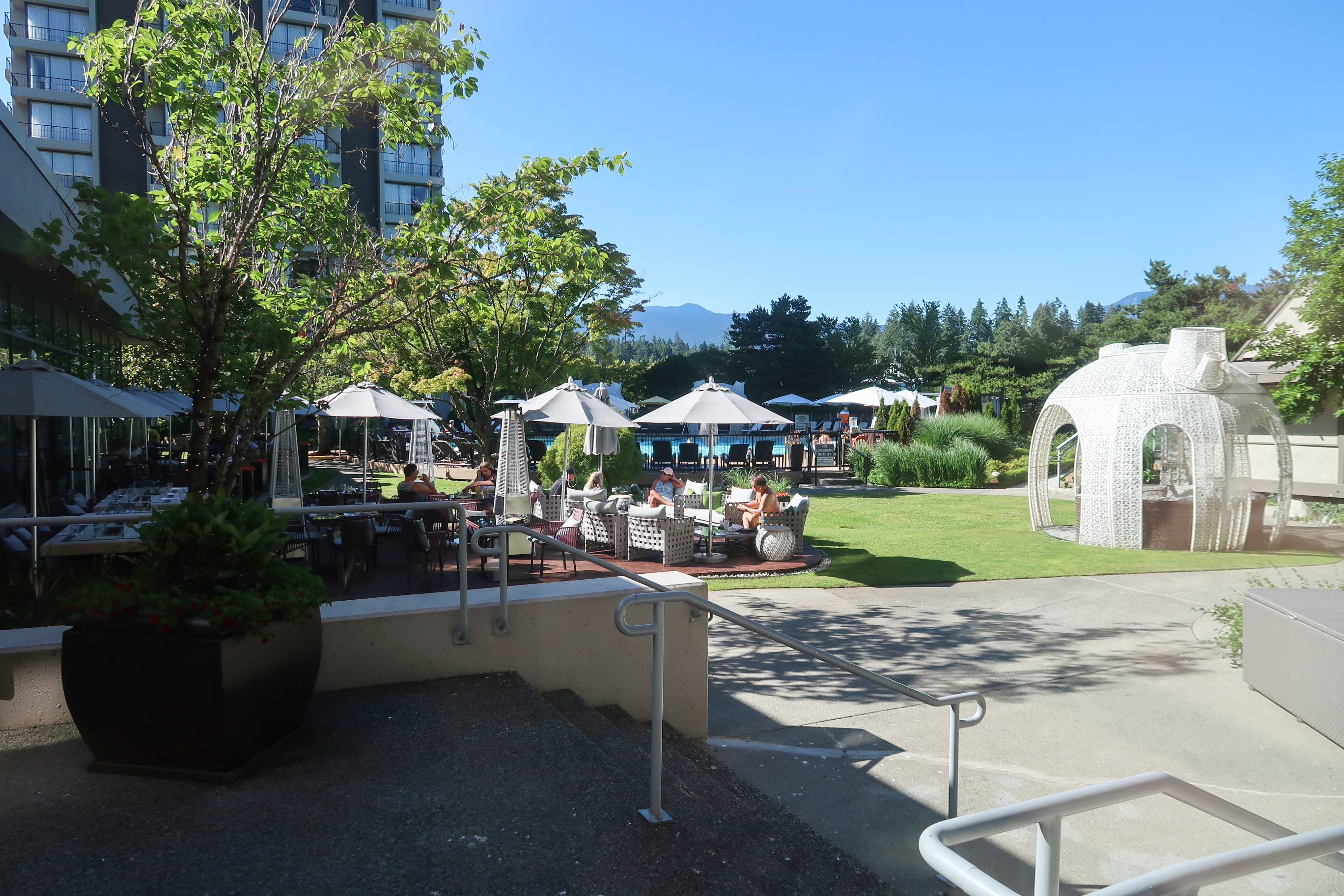
Outdoor garden

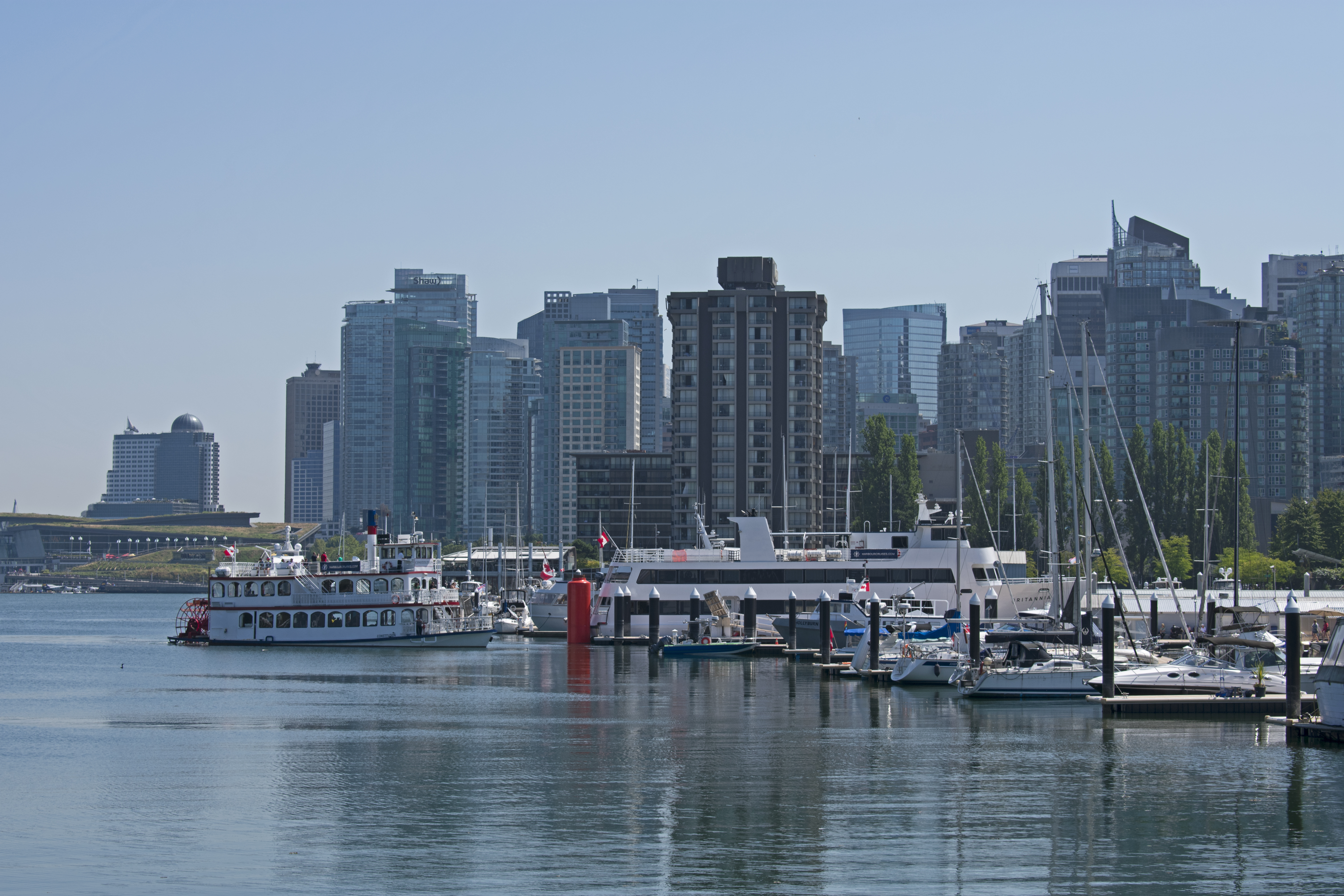
The Westin Bayshore and Coal Harbour, 1970 tower in center
