= West End, Vancouver =

West End
- Neighbourhood
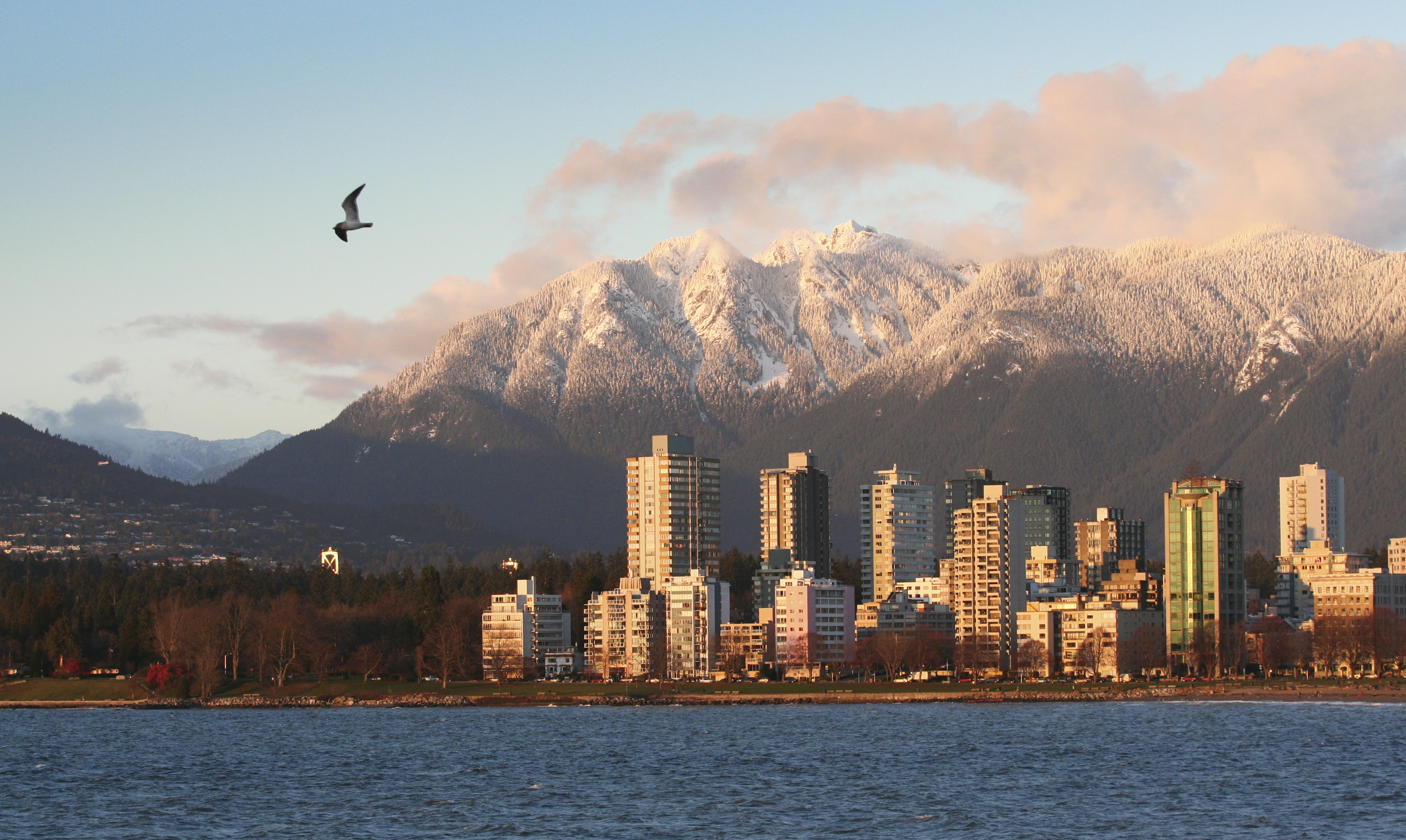
- View of the West End and English Bay at sunset

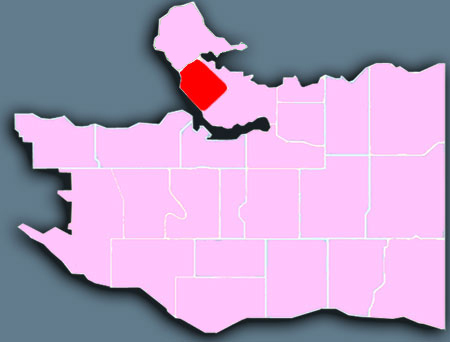
- Location of the West End shown in red
- Coordinates: 49.285°N 123.134°W
- Country: Canada
- Province: British Columbia
- City: Vancouver

Area
  - Land: 1.98 km^{2} (0.76 sq mi)

Population (2016)
  - Total: 47,200
  - Density: 23,838.4/km^{2} (61,741/sq mi)
- Time zone: UTC−08:00 (PST)
  - Summer (DST): UTC−07:00 (PDT)
- Forward sortation area: V6E
- Area codes: 604, 778, 236, 672
- Website: vancouver.ca/community_profiles/west_end/index.htm

The West End is a neighbourhood in Vancouver, British Columbia, Canada, located between the Coal Harbour neighbourhood and the financial and central business districts of Downtown Vancouver to the east, Stanley Park to the northwest, the English Bay to the west, and Kitsilano to the southwest across the False Creek opening.

The West End is not to be confused with the West Side (which denotes the western half of the non-downtown part of Vancouver city to the south) or West Vancouver ("West Van"), a separate municipality (conversely, and to the confusion of some, "East Van", "the East End", and "the East Side" all denote East Vancouver). Conversely to the West End, sometimes “the East End” can be used to refer to the Eastern End of Downtown aka the Downtown Eastside.

The definition of the "official neighbourhood" of the West End, according to the city, is the area west of Burrard Street, east of Lost Lagoon, and south of West Georgia Street. Historically the term originated and remains used by Vancouverites to refer to everything from Burrard Street to Stanley Park, including the Stanley Park Neighbourhood west of Denman Street and the Coal Harbour Neighbourhood. Coal Harbour Neighbourhood is officially designated as west of Burrard and to the north of West Georgia, although the newly built areas between West Pender Street and the waterfront are expressly "Coal Harbour" and not considered part of the West End.

== History ==
Like all of Vancouver, the West End was originally a forested wilderness. The area was purchased in 1862 by John Morton, Samuel Brighouse, and William Hailstone, three men known as the "Three Greenhorn Englishmen", or just the "Three Greenhorns", a nickname they earned from others who thought they were buying a massive plot of wild land at an inflated price. The men had plans to establish a brickworks on the shore of Coal Harbour, and their land claim was originally staked with the hopeful intent of mining for porcelain clays, but the grade of clay was not fine enough for that use. When those plans failed (a lack of transportation being a key factor) they sold a good portion of the area, by then known as the Brickmaker's Claim, to Victoria investors who in turn tried to promote its development as New Liverpool. The only thing that happened with that scheme was a subdivision plan registered with the Land Titles office in New Westminster. Another name used for the property was the Brighouse Estate (Brighouse as a name came to refer to a particular part of Richmond, where "Greenhorn" J. Morton also owned property). One of the partners, observant that brick was a valuable building commodity despite the abundance of timber in the region, moved the brick-clay operations to Sumas Mountain, establishing the community of Clayburn, now a neighbourhood of Abbotsford.

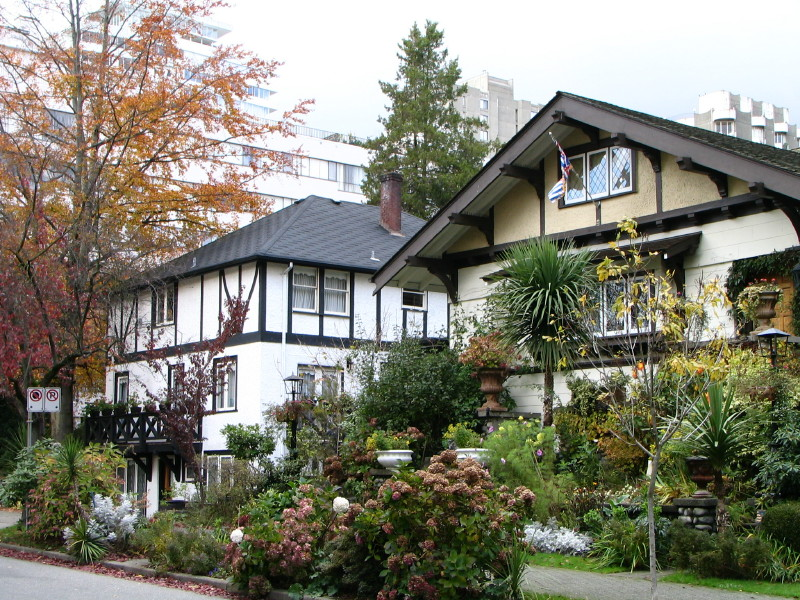
A couple of typical older-era houses on Comox Street

Later, with the arrival of the Canadian Pacific Railway, with its terminus at nearby Coal Harbour, the West End became Vancouver's first upscale neighbourhood, home to the richest railroad families. Many of these families lived along Georgia Street, known at that time as "Blue Blood Alley" for all the posh mansions built there. Later mansions (including the Davie mansion) were built in then remoter areas of the West End as the financial district's land values displaced the high-toned residences. This role was ultimately dropped with the increasing vogue for the upscale Shaughnessy neighbourhood, and as middle-class housing of various kinds began to fill out the West End. As the city grew, the West End became a transitory place for new arrivals from elsewhere in Canada, the United Kingdom, and later for immigrants from other countries, establishing a tradition of diversity. Following World War II, a significant German commercial community emerged along Robson Street, giving birth to the nickname Robsonstrasse, a name still occasionally used in marketing despite the loss of its original meaning.

=== Sex work displacement ===
West End residents have been very active in shaping their neighbourhood and maintaining its liveability. In the 1970s, residents banded together to calm traffic that was using the neighbourhood as a shortcut between downtown Vancouver and the suburbs of the North Shore, across the Lions' Gate Bridge. They also staged a successful, yet destructive "Shame the Johns" campaign to rid the West End of the sex work that was then visible in the neighbourhood. This campaign was formed by a group of politicians called the Concerned Residents of the West End (CROWE), prominently containing cisgender white gay men, who aided in the formation of a 1984 injunction granted by then-B.C. Supreme Court Justice Allan McEachern. This injunction banned sex workers from working west of Granville Street, which forcibly displaced them away from the relative safety and community support of Davie Street. Following this, they were forced into Yaletown, then Mount Pleasant, where they were repeatedly protested by "Shame the Johns vigilantes", down East Broadway, and eventually into the Downtown Eastside, where already vulnerable sex workers are more open to violence and abuse than ever before. These displacements were worse repetitions of earlier erasures that happened on Dupont and Alexander Street. Further, this displacement largely targeted transgender, two-spirit and First Nations women, replicated the colonial practices and dispossession of land from the Musqueam, Burrard, and Squamish First Nations.

== Demographics ==
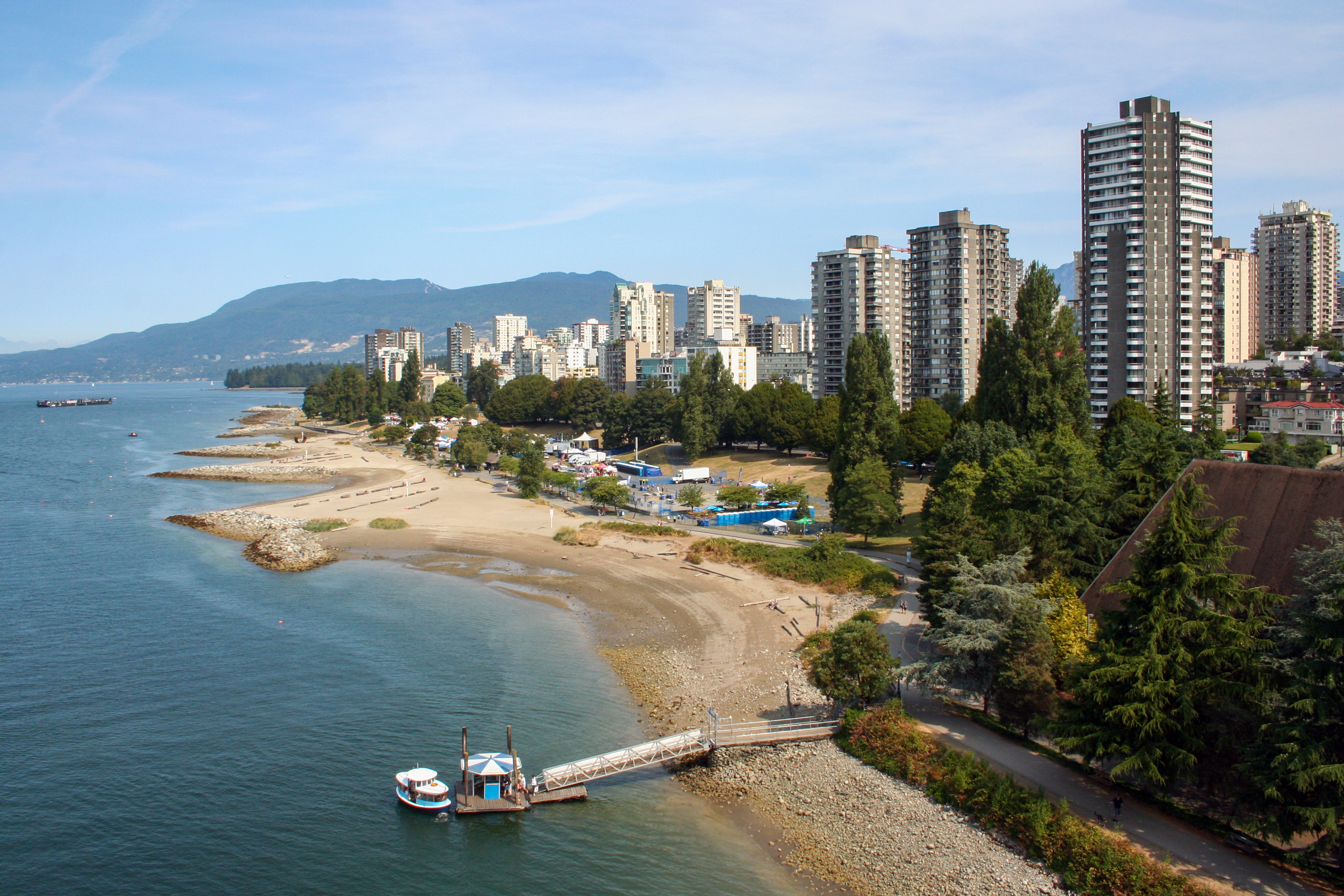
View of West End along the Vancouver coast and Beach Avenue

The West End is bordered by downtown on the one side, Stanley Park on the other and by water on two. The West End is home to a mixed population, old and young, of Canadians, immigrants and international transient residents. Like other downtown neighbourhoods, the West End is very densely populated. It is adjacent to the downtown core business and financial districts, with traffic calmed streets punctuated by concrete islands, sidewalk barricades, and mini-parks and many residential heritage buildings including The Manhattan, The Beaconsfield, The Beverly and The Queen Charlotte.

Close to 45,000 people of all ages, incomes, ethnicities, and sexual orientations live in the West End. The age group of 20–39 years consistently ranks the largest at 48%, followed by 40-64 at 34%, 65+ at 13% and under 19 at 6%. Containing 7.4% of the City's population, the West End welcomed 14% of new Vancouverites between 2001 and 2006. The West End is also home to Western Canada's largest LGBTQ community. Vancouver's gay village, called Davie Village, is centred primarily on Davie Street between Burrard and Bute.

The share of single-parent families in the West End is about 12%, compared to 17% for the City of Vancouver. Statistics also show that the West End is home to many children — the downtown peninsula now has more children than traditional family neighbourhoods such as West Point Grey or Kerrisdale. Lord Roberts Annex offers kindergarten to grade 3. The student population of Lord Roberts Elementary School (k-grade 7) represents 43 countries and 37 languages. King George Secondary School (grades 8-12) celebrated 100 years in 2014.

In 2021, the Statistics Canada census reported that, in Vancouver, 166,490 households were renters, which represented about 55% of all private households in Vancouver. In 2025, the RTB rendered a judicial decision for a West End building with 170 apartments in the Cardero Case which inspired major changes in the City of Vancouver by-laws to better protect tenants from unsanitary living conditions, poor building maintenance and the lack of proper ventilation inside the homes of Vancouver residents.

Panethnic groups in the West End neighbourhood (2001−2016)
Panethnic group	2016		2006		2001	
Panethnic group	Pop.	%	Pop.	%	Pop.	%
European (Note: Statistic includes all persons that did not make up part of a visible minority or an indigenous identity.)	32,265	69.06%	31,065	70.09%	31,130	74.28%
East Asian (Note: Statistic includes total responses of "Chinese", "Korean", and "Japanese" under visible minority section on census.)	5,365	11.48%	7,110	16.04%	5,910	14.1%
Middle Eastern (Note: Statistic includes total responses of "West Asian" and "Arab" under visible minority section on census.)	2,175	4.66%	1,160	2.62%	1,000	2.39%
Latin American	1,785	3.82%	1,105	2.49%	585	1.4%
Southeast Asian (Note: Statistic includes total responses of "Filipino" and "Southeast Asian" under visible minority section on census.)	1,465	3.14%	1,295	2.92%	955	2.28%
South Asian	1,320	2.83%	860	1.94%	860	2.05%
Indigenous	1,070	2.29%	665	1.5%	810	1.93%
African	625	1.34%	570	1.29%	425	1.01%
Other/Multiracial (Note: Statistic includes total responses of "Visible minority, n.i.e." and "Multiple visible minorities" under visible minority section on census.)	655	1.4%	485	1.09%	215	0.51%
Total responses	46,720	98.98%	44,320	99.46%	41,910	99.5%
Total population	47,200	100%	44,560	100%	42,120	100%
Note: Totals greater than 100% due to multiple origin responses

== Amenities ==
The West End is particularly famous among visitors for Robson Street. It was historically known as the Robsonstrasse, for the postwar period when it was a hub for immigrants from Germany, and was home to owner operated boutiques, schnitzel houses and other bistro-style dining establishments until the 1980s when the transition to the current fashionable shopping and dining area stretching from Burrard Street to Jervis Street, began. Many restaurants and shops can also be found along Denman Street closer to Stanley Park, and Davie Street between Burrard and Jervis streets.

Numerous parks and beaches can be found throughout the West End including Alexandra Park, Cardero Park, Nelson Park, Stanley Park and Sunset Beach. These parks range in size from 0.22 hectares (Morton Park) to over 406 hectare (Stanley Park). A portion of the Stanley Park Seawall promenade runs along the waterfront from Burrard Bridge to Ceperly Park.

The area is also known for English Bay Beach, a large park on English Bay which used to be thronged during the annual Celebration of Light fireworks display each year mid-summer. St. Paul's Hospital, one of Vancouver's largest and oldest health facilities, sits at the neighbourhood's eastern edge on Burrard Street.

Community Centres in the West End include the Vancouver Aquatic Centre, West End Community Centre, Coal Harbour Community Centre and Barclay Manor. Depending on the centre, they offer swimming pools, gyms, fitness centres and an ice rink, as well as many meeting and all-purpose rooms for rent.

== See also ==
- Davie Village
- The West End Journal
