= Deadman's Island (Vancouver) =

Island in Canada

Coordinates: 49.2953°N 123.1228°W

Deadman Island
Native name: skwtsa7s Nickname: Deadman's Island

Geography
- Area: 3.8 ha (9.4 acres)

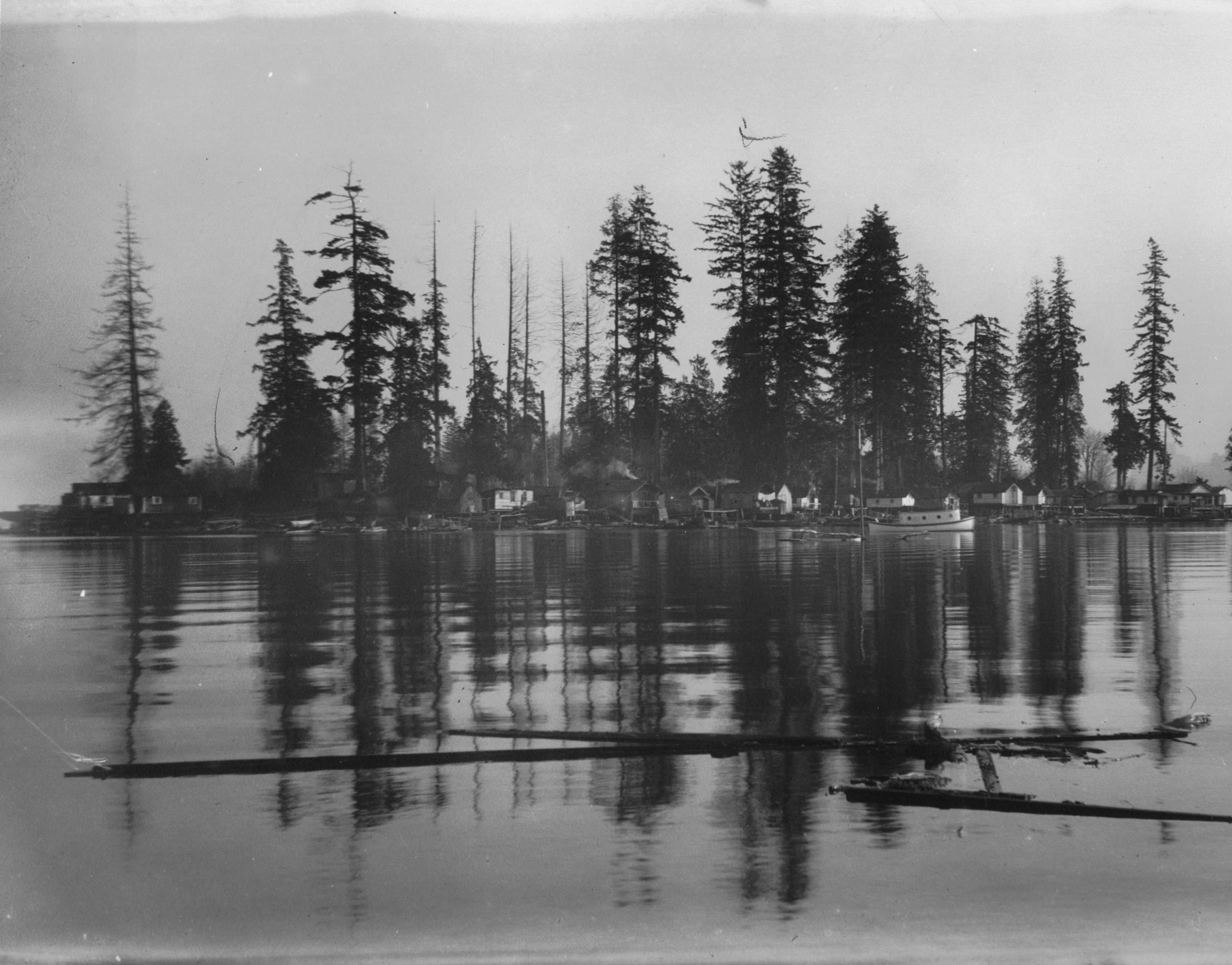
Deadman Island, 1910 showing squatters' houses.

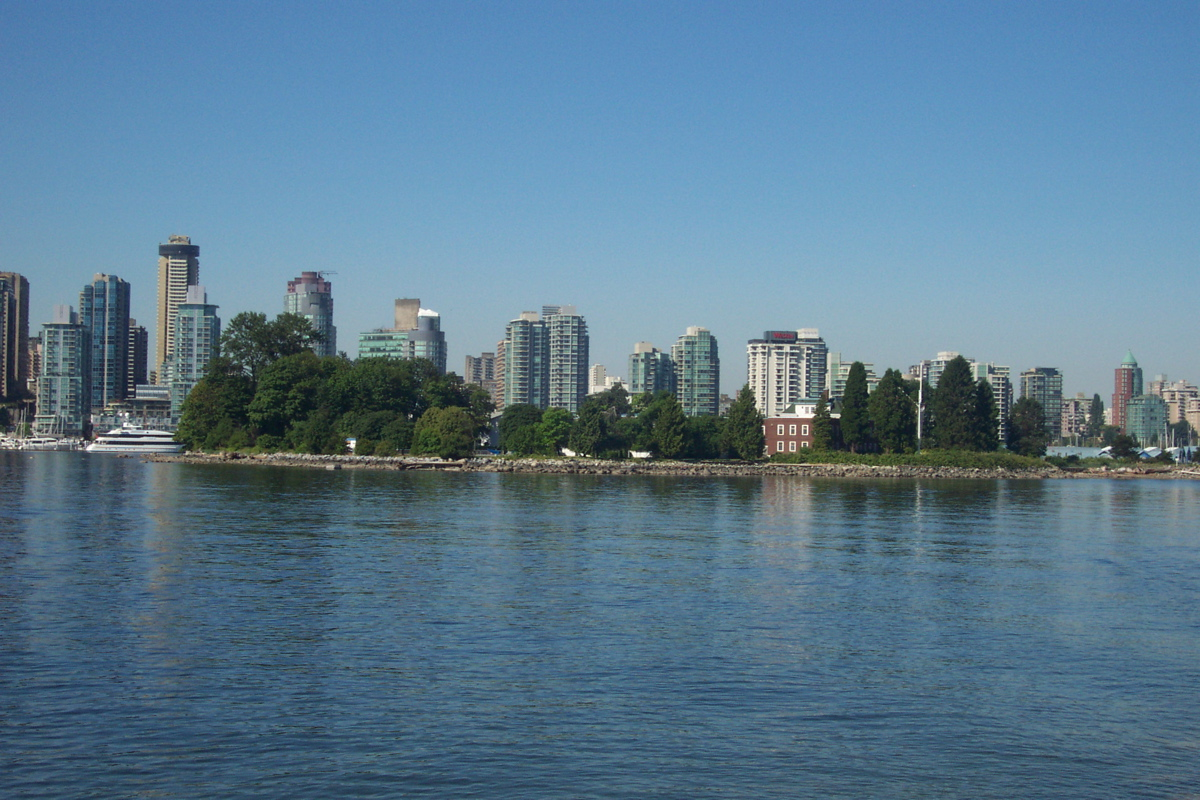
Deadman Island in 2006

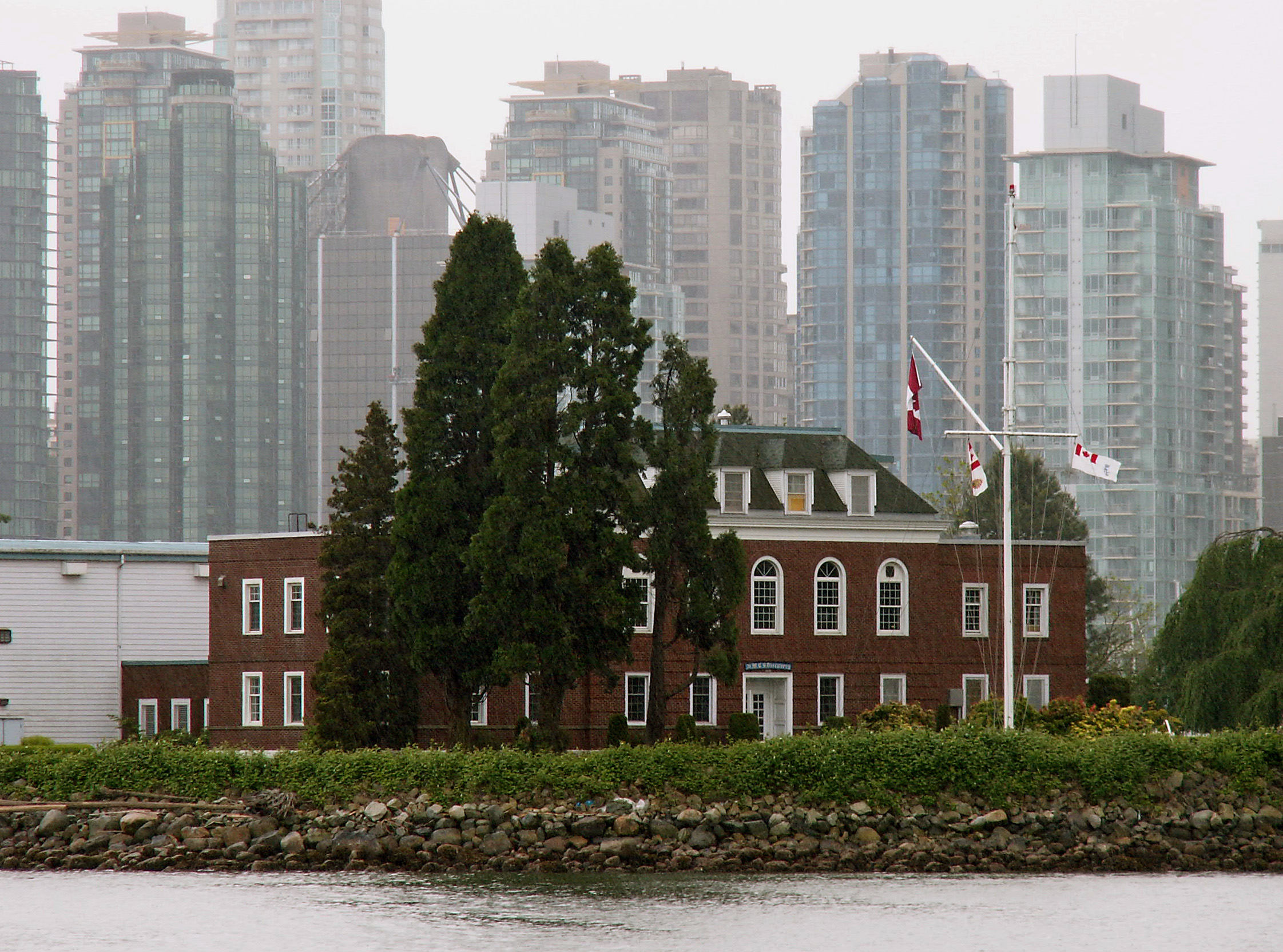
Naval Reserve Division HMCS Discovery on Deadman Island.

Deadman Island is a 3.8 ha island to the south of Stanley Park in Coal Harbour in Vancouver, British Columbia. The indigenous Squamish name is "skwtsa7s", meaning simply "island." Officially designated Deadman Island by the Geographical Names Board of Canada in 1937, it is commonly referred to as Deadman's Island. In its long history, it has been a battle site, a native tree-burial cemetery, and a smallpox and squatter settlement. Today it is the site of Vancouver's Naval Reserve Division, HMCS Discovery.

== Early history ==
One of Vancouver's first white settlers, John Morton, visited the island in 1862. Morton discovered hundreds of red cedar boxes lashed to the upper boughs of trees and one had evidently fallen and broken to reveal a jumble of bones and a tassel of black hair. The island was the tree-burial grounds of the Squamish people. Undeterred, Morton took a fancy to the island and attempted to acquire it. He changed his mind when Chief Capilano pointed out that the island was "dead ground" and was a scene of a bloody battle between rival tribes in which some two hundred warriors were killed. It's said that "fire-flower" grew up at once where they fell, frightening the foe into retreat. The macabre name of the island is thought to reflect this history, although the Squamish name is simply skwtsa7s, meaning "island."

Settlers continued to use the island as a cemetery prior to the 1887 opening of Mountain View Cemetery. Between 1888 and 1892, Deadman Island became a quarantine site for victims of a smallpox epidemic and burial ground for those who did not survive.

== Ludgate affair ==
This small islet again became the site of conflict when Theodore Ludgate leased the island from the federal government in 1899, to the chagrin of the mayor and other civic officials who assumed that it was included in the original Stanley Park land grant. Mayor James Garden, with police accompaniment, tried to prevent Ludgate from clearing the land by reading the first ever Vancouver riot act after a showdown between Ludgate's men and the police. Ludgate escaped arrest, and police guards were left on the island, but the protracted legal battle that followed gave Ludgate the opportunity to proceed with his plan to build a saw mill and log the island. By 1911, Ludgate had won his case, cleared the island of both trees and the squatter community that lived there. Ludgate was subsequently unable to meet the terms of his lease, and the island reverted to the Dominion government. In 1930, the island was offered to the city by the federal government to be used as a park, but a park never materialized, and it was instead turned into a naval station in 1944.

== His Majesty's Canadian Ship Discovery ==
HMCS Discovery is Vancouver's Naval Reserve Division that is housed in the stone frigate that is strategically located on the island in support of the security of Vancouver Harbour. The facility housed the Joint Maritime Operations Centre for the APEC Summit in 1997 and the 2010 Winter Olympics. In addition to the Naval Reserve Division, RCSCC Corps 47 Captain Vancouver and NLCC Captain Rankin have their weekly parades at HMCS Discovery and the facility houses a naval museum. The island is connected to the mainland of Stanley Park at low tide, as well as via a short timber-structure bridge.

== Future of the island ==
The city's lease of Deadman Island from the federal government expired in 2007 and was subsequently renewed in 2008. The former mayor of Vancouver, Sam Sullivan, "envisioned it as the home for a ferry shuttle from downtown, a maritime museum and a building to celebrate the island's aboriginal heritage." The Musqueam First Nation, however, claim the island as part of its land claim in the area. The island's future remains with the Department of National Defence and its status controversial, as it has been through much of Vancouver's history.
