= HMCS Discovery =

Coordinates: 49°17′42.76″N 123°7′22.13″W

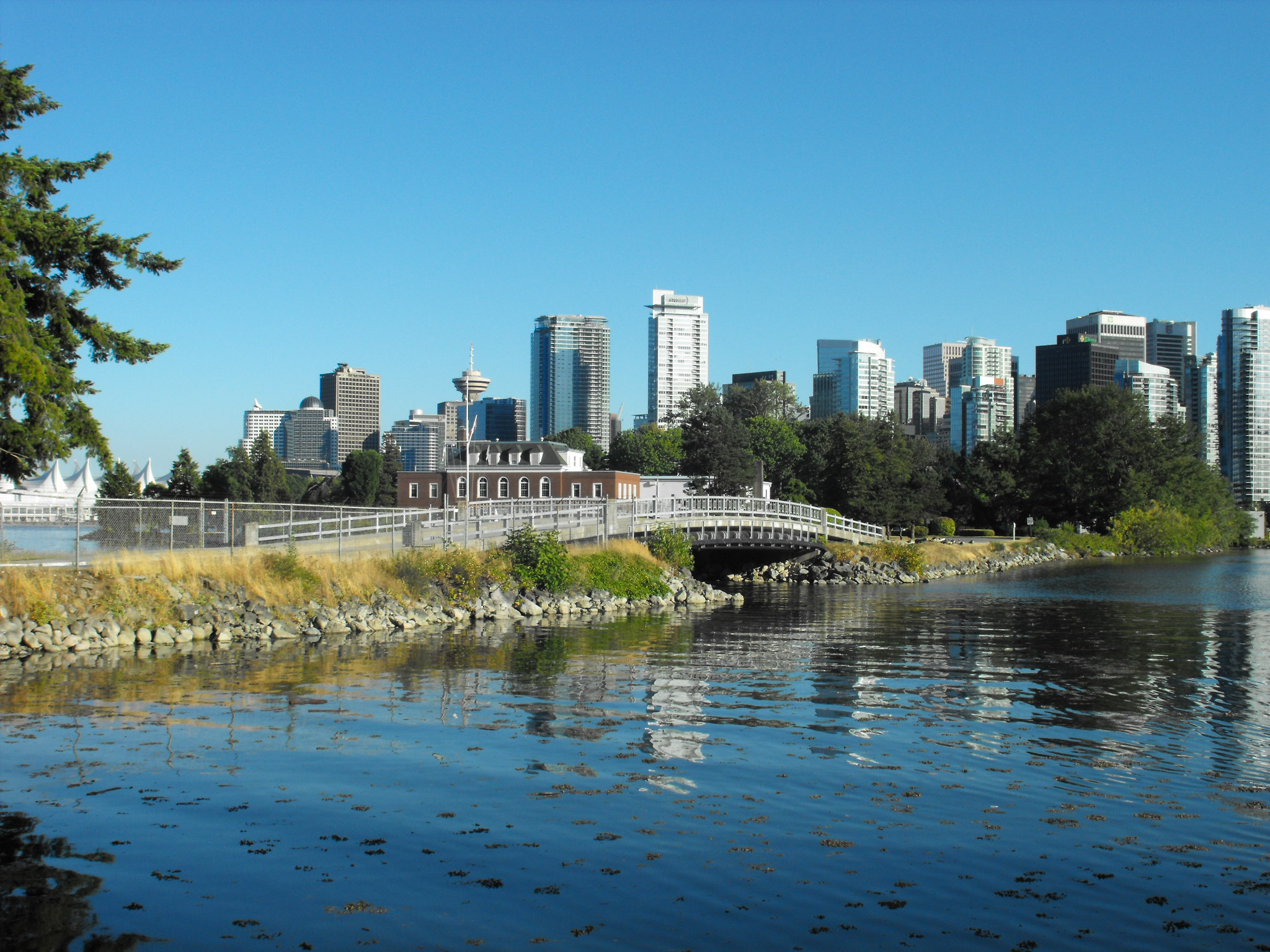
- HMCS Discovery on Deadman's Island, as seen from Stanley Park
- Active: 1941–present
- Country: Canada
- Branch: Royal Canadian Navy
- Type: Naval Reserve division
- Role: Reserve unit
- Size: 250
- Part of: Canadian Forces Naval Reserve
- Garrison/HQ: 1200 Stanley Park Drive; Vancouver, British Columbia; V6G 3E2
- Mottos: Steadfast and Vigilant
- Colours: Blue, white and gold
- Equipment: 24 ft (7.3 m) RHIB (ZH-733 CDO)
- Battle honours: Portland, 1653; Copenhagen, 1801

Commanders
- Commanding Officer: Cdr Jeff Baxter
- Executive Officer: LCdr Neal Henne
- Coxswain: CPO2 Matthew Williams

HMCS Discovery is a Royal Canadian Navy Reserve division and based in Vancouver, British Columbia, Canada. Created during World War II from the Vancouver Half Company of the Royal Naval Canadian Volunteer Reserve, it was used for recruitment and training, and provided almost 8,000 personnel during the war. It continued its training role after the war, and is also headquarters for several Cadet units.

The stone frigate takes its name from HMS Discovery, the ship used by George Vancouver to chart most of North America's northwestern coast. Originally based at the Stanley Park Barracks, in 1944 it moved to its current location on Deadman Island, in Coal Harbour, adjacent to Stanley Park.

== History ==
=== World wars ===
Discovery traces its history to the creation of the "Number 2 (Vancouver) Company" of the Royal Naval Canadian Volunteer Reserve at the beginning of the First World War. This small group was composed of 87 members of the Royal Vancouver Yacht Club who served and were demobilized at the end of the war. It was not until May 1924 that Lieutenant-Commander J.W. Hobbs was given permission to form the first "Vancouver Half Company" of the Naval Volunteer Reserve. Robert Louis Stevenson's schooner Casco was used for a time to train cadets in the 1920s.

During the Second World War, the role of the reserves increased, reflecting the need to maintain sufficient manpower for the war effort. On 1 November 1941, the division was newly commissioned as HMCS Discovery and it moved into Stanley Park Barracks. In 1944, the unit was permitted to occupy Deadman Island in Stanley Park and turn this property into a training facility. During the Second World War, Discovery was one of the greatest sources of naval recruits in Canada, having enrolled 372 officers, 6,974 ratings and 650 Wrens (Women's Royal Canadian Naval Service – WRCNS). Of those, 61 were killed in action. At the end of the war, Discovery became the discharge centre for the whole of the British Columbia mainland, and 8,378 men and women were discharged through the base.

=== Modern era ===
HMCS Discovery continues to serve as a training facility, force-generating personnel for Canadian Armed Forces (CAF) operations. Discovery personnel have been deployed to Korea, the Persian Gulf, Egypt, Bosnia, Iraq, Japan, Golan Heights and Afghanistan. The facility provided support for the 1997 APEC meeting in Vancouver. It was the Olympic Maritime Operations Centre for the 2010 Winter Olympics and conducted port-security around the country.

It is also the site of the Western Region Diving Centre, coordinating the efforts of the various port inspection diving teams at Naval Reserve Divisions in Western Canada. The unit continues to serve as host and ambassador to dozens of foreign vessels visiting the Port of Vancouver.

In addition to the Naval Reserve, Discovery houses Royal Canadian Sea Cadet Corps Captain Vancouver and Navy League Cadet Corps Captain Rankin. Discovery is also the site of the Naval Museum of Vancouver and Vancouver Naval Veterans Association.

== Badge ==
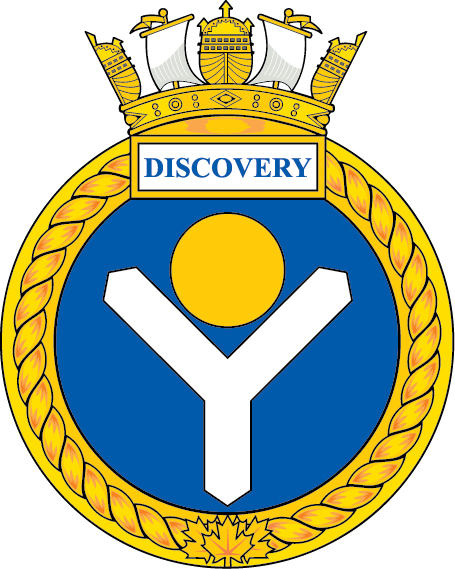

Sir Arthur W. Cochran, Clarenceaux King of Arms, suggested that the badge of HMCS Discovery take the form of a rebus. It depicts a gold disc on top of a shake-fork that looks like the letter Y; a "disc over Y".
