= Coal Harbour =

- Neighbourhood
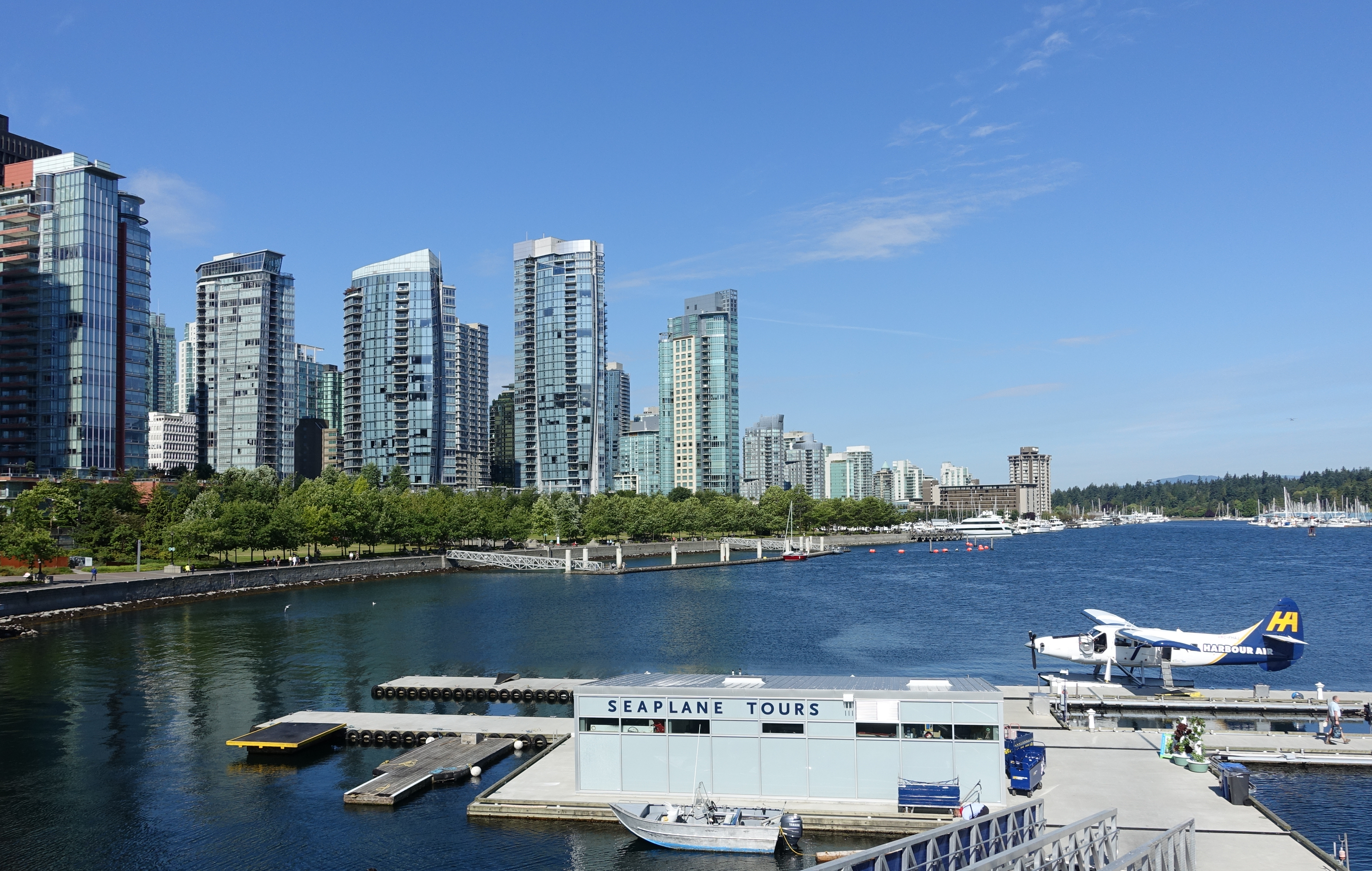

- Coal Harbour in Vancouver
- Coordinates: 49°17′35″N 123°07′32″W
- Country: Canada
- Province: British Columbia
- City: Vancouver

Area
  - Total: 0.573 km^{2} (0.221 sq mi)

Population (2021)
  - Total: 10,441
  - Density: 18,222/km^{2} (47,190/sq mi)
- Time zone: UTC-8 (PST)
  - Summer (DST): UTC-7 (PDT)
- Website: coalharbour.org

Coal Harbour is a section of Burrard Inlet lying between Vancouver's Downtown Peninsula and the Brockton Point of Stanley Park. It has also now become the name of the neighbourhood adjacent to its southern shoreline.

== Neighbourhood ==
Coal Harbour is used to designate the relatively new official neighbourhood of the City of Vancouver bounded by roughly Burrard Street and Pender near the Financial District to West Georgia Street near the West End in the south to Stanley Park in the north. The neighbourhood consists of numerous high-rise residential apartment and condominium towers with luxury townhome podiums.

=== Features ===
The northwestern section near Stanley Park features picturesque parkland, private marinas, several rowing and boating clubs, high-end shops and restaurants, and a community centre designed by architect Gregory Henriquez. To the east is Deadman's Island, the site of the naval station and museum HMCS Discovery, where the harbour itself opens up to the Burrard Inlet. Towards the Financial District in the southeast, the neighbourhood is dominated by high-rise office buildings, hotels and numerous apartment towers. Immediately south lies Vancouver's Luxury Zone along Alberni Street.

Coal Harbour is home to Vancouver Harbour Water Aerodrome, located a few blocks from Canada Place and the Vancouver Convention Centre. Within the harbour is a floating gas station for marine vessels. The 2010 Winter Olympics cauldron is installed at Jack Poole Plaza.

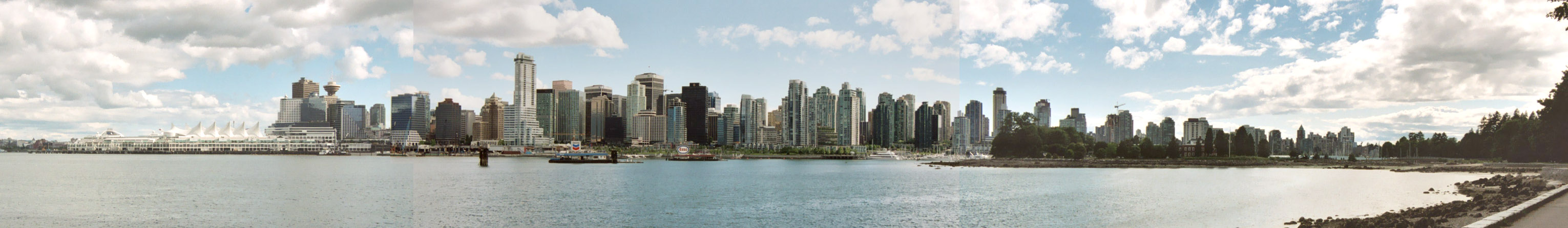
Coal Harbour residential skyscrapers (on the right) from Stanley Park, with the financial district (on the left) and the rest of Downtown Vancouver (in the background)

== History ==
Historical population
Year	Pop.	±%
2006	7,748	—
2011	8,552	+10.4%
2016	9,190	+7.5%
2021	10,441	+13.6%

The discovery of coal in the harbor in 1862 inspired the name. In the days when the area along West Pender Street was an upper-class residential district, Coal Harbour was known as Blueblood Alley because of the many large mansions along it.

Notable inhabitants and developments in Coal Harbour's past include:

- Squamish settlements, notably on Deadman Island, Brockton Point and Lumberman's Arch.
- In 1862 minor exploration began of the visible coal seams on the flank of the bluff overlooking the harbour, first noted by Captain Vancouver. This bluff was approximately where most of West Hastings Street is today. The coal was low-grade, but its occurrence in clays similar to porcelain-making clays of the English Midlands led to the staking of what is known as the Brickmaker's Claim by the Three Greenhorns. The Brickmaker's Claim is now the West End. No clay was ever mined nor porcelain ever made, but one of the Greenhorns was the developer of the clay mine and brickworks at Clayburn on Sumas Mountain near Abbotsford.
- A settlement of Kanakas (Hawaiians) near today's Bayshore Inn and the eastern end of Lost Lagoon was known as the Kanaka Rancherie, or the Cherry Orchard due to its many cherry trees. The area is now called Devonian Harbour Park, and memorial cherry trees have been planted there in memory of AIDS victims, a poignant tribute connected to the work of AIDS Vancouver.
- The Vancouver Boating Club, now Vancouver Rowing Club, from 1887 (originally at the bottom of the bluff at the foot of Howe Street)
- The Pacific Lumber Mill Company in the late 19th century
- The Royal Vancouver Yacht Club (their first clubhouse floated in Coal Harbour at the foot of Cardero street in 1903)
- Denman Arena was built in 1911 to house the Vancouver Millionaires professional ice hockey club on the Kanakas Ranch site at Georgia and Denman. The Arena would host the only victory by a Vancouver team of the Stanley Cup in 1915. The Denman Auditorium was built adjacent to the Arena in 1927 for concerts and smaller events. The Arena was destroyed by fire in 1936. The Auditorium remained in use until its demolition in 1959.
- Boeing Canada's Seaplane and Boat Factory beginning in the 1910s; (they purchased the Hoffar-Beeching Shipyard at 1927 West Georgia in 1929)
- William Boeing's yacht, the superb Taconite, was built at Hoffars in 1931.
- The Vancouver Shipyards through the 1930s
- The CP Rail Station & Canadian Pacific Steamships passenger terminal/dock
- The Royal Canadian Air Force began work on a seaplane base and reconnaissance station at Coal Harbour in 1940. As part of the war effort, the RCAF turned over its direction finding and intercept facility to the Royal Canadian Navy. Due to an organizational change in 1942, the RCN ratings stationed at Coal Harbour and the ones from Ucluelet were withdrawn and moved to Gordon Head near Victoria.
- Harbour Ferries, a tour-boat and water-taxi service, continues to operate from docks in Coal Harbour
- Howard Hughes, who resided in the top two floors of the Bayshore Inn (now The Westin Bayshore) for 5 months and 28 days in the 1970s (6 months would have triggered Canadian residency and taxation issues for Mr. Hughes).
- Trader Vic's, for many years held to be Vancouver's best night-out, was launched in a tiki-style hut next to the Bayshore.
- HMCS Discovery, a naval base on Deadman Island.
- In 1993 Vancouver City Council froze applications for the development of the Marathon Realty lands between Canada Place and The Westin Bayshore. The company was required to reach an agreement with The First Narrows Floating Co-op, representing floating home and live-aboard boat residents in pre existing marinas, for their inclusion in the redevelopment of the waterfront. Negotiations concluded with the guarantee of space for residents in Coal Harbour Marina on extended leases.
- Between 1994 and 2010, the previous Canadian Pacific Railway lands along Coal Harbour were redeveloped into a highrise community and Convention Center.
