= Sports in Vancouver =

Overview of sports traditions and activities in Vancouver

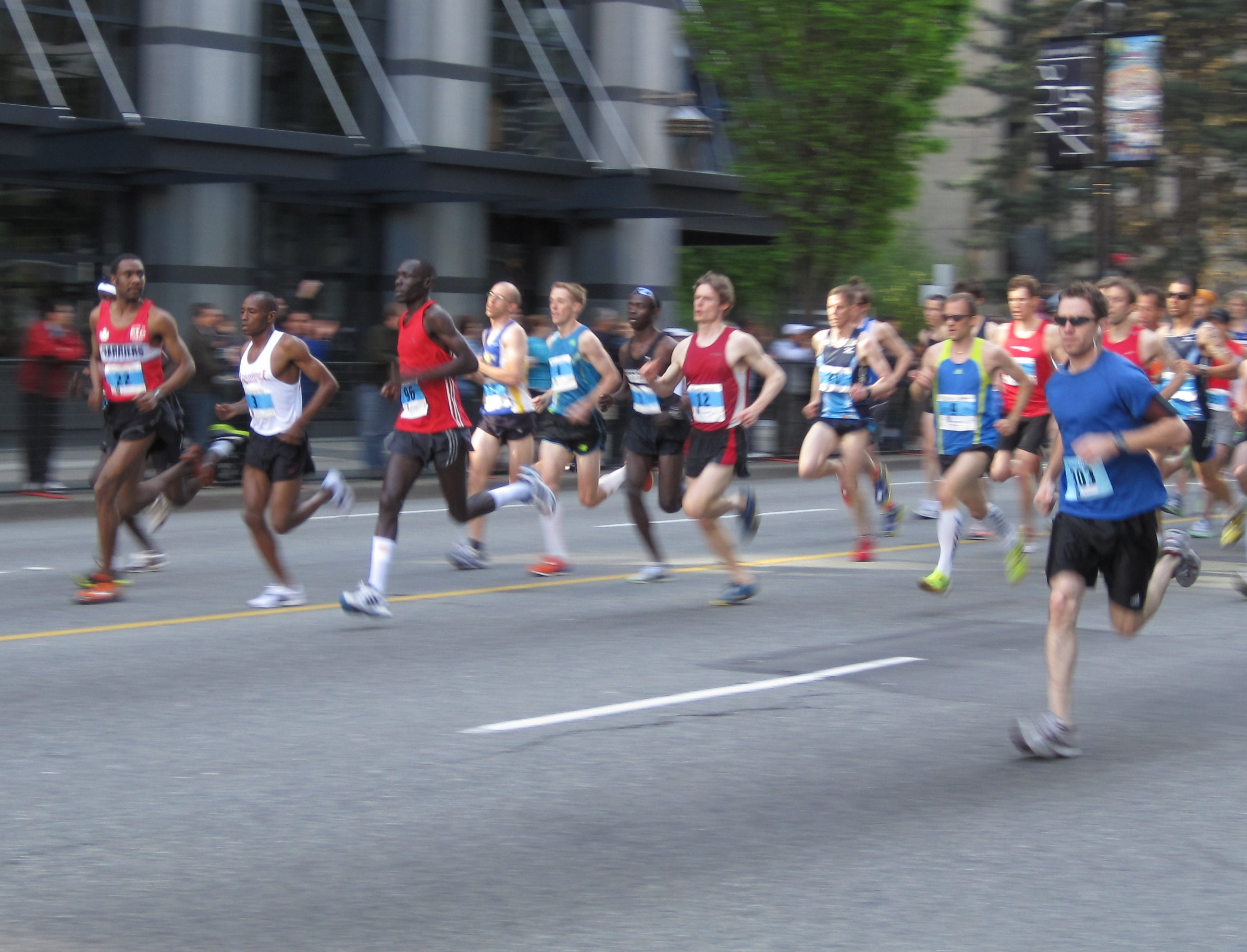
Participants running after the start of the 2010 Vancouver Sun Run

There have been a wide variety of sports in Vancouver since the city was founded. Team sports such as ice hockey, lacrosse, and Canadian football have extensive history in the area, while the city's relatively mild climate and geographical location facilitate a wide variety of other sports and recreational activities.

== Major professional teams ==
Team	Sport	League	Venue (capacity)	Established	Titles
BC Lions	Canadian Football	CFL	BC Place (54,405)	1954	6
Vancouver Canucks	Ice Hockey	NHL	Rogers Arena (18,910)	1970	0
Vancouver Whitecaps FC	Soccer	MLS	BC Place (22,120)	2011	0
Vancouver Warriors	Box Lacrosse	NLL	Rogers Arena (18,910)	2018	0
Vancouver Goldeneyes	Ice Hockey	PWHL	Pacific Coliseum (16,281)	2025	0
Vancouver FC	Soccer	CanPL	Willoughby Stadium (6,560)	2023	0
Vancouver Canadians	Baseball	MiLB	Nat Bailey Stadium (6,500)	2000	15
Vancouver Bandits	Basketball	CEBL	Langley Events Centre (5,276)	2018	0
Vancouver Rise FC	Soccer	NSL	Swangard Stadium (5,288)	2025	1
WFC2	Soccer	MLSNP	Swangard Stadium (5,288)	2014	0
Vancouver Guardians	Cricket	GT20	TD Cricket Arena (5,000)	2026	0
Vancouver Surge	Esports	CDL	No home stadium	2019	1

== Sports teams ==
A number of amateur and professional sports teams are based in Vancouver.

=== Amateur ===
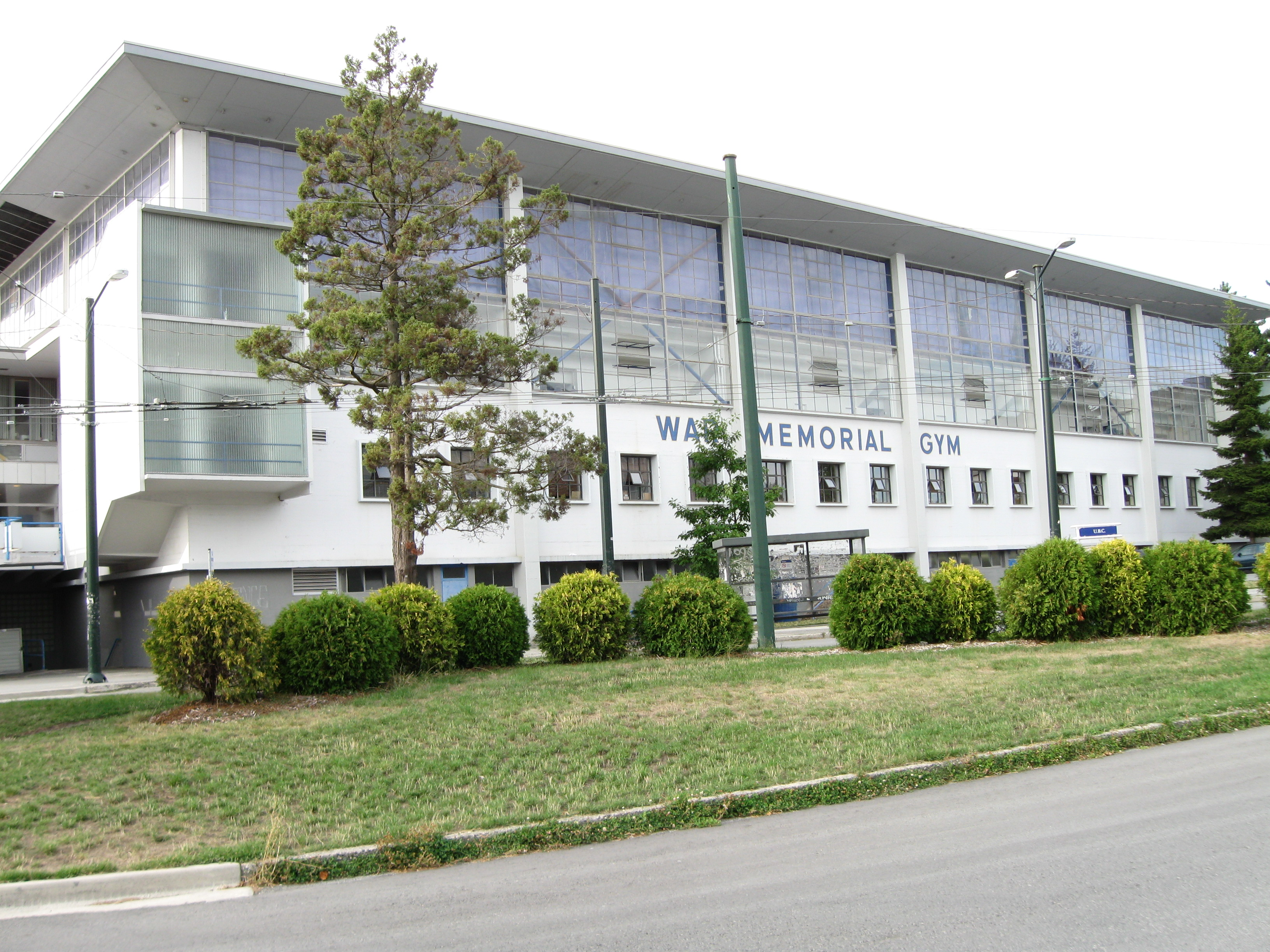
The War Memorial Gym at the University of British Columbia is used as the home venue for several UBC varsity teams

The Vancouver Giants of the Western Hockey League, founded in 2001, play their home games in Langley. The Giants hosted and won the 2007 Memorial Cup. The Vancouver area also has a number of hockey teams in the Tier II British Columbia Hockey League.

There are a number of amateur lacrosse teams in Greater Vancouver, competing under the auspices of the British Columbia Lacrosse Association. The New Westminster Salmonbellies have won the Mann Cup, Canada's senior lacrosse championship, a record 24 times. There are also several amateur teams in sports such as soccer, baseball, softball, Canadian football, field hockey, rugby, Gaelic football, Water Polo, disc ultimate and roller derby.

Prominent annual amateur sports events in Vancouver include the BC High School Basketball Championship at the PNE Agrodome, the High School Football Championship at BC Place, and the Canada Cup softball tournament in South Surrey. Also notable is the college rivalry between the UBC Thunderbirds and Simon Fraser Red Leafs (formerly SFU Clan), who meet annually in the Shrum Bowl (football) and Buchanan Cup (basketball). These are very popular sport events in Vancouver.

=== Professional ===
Vancouver is home to a number of professional sports teams, including a number of teams in major professional sports leagues of North America, including the Canadian Football League, Major League Soccer, and the National Hockey League.

==== BC Lions ====
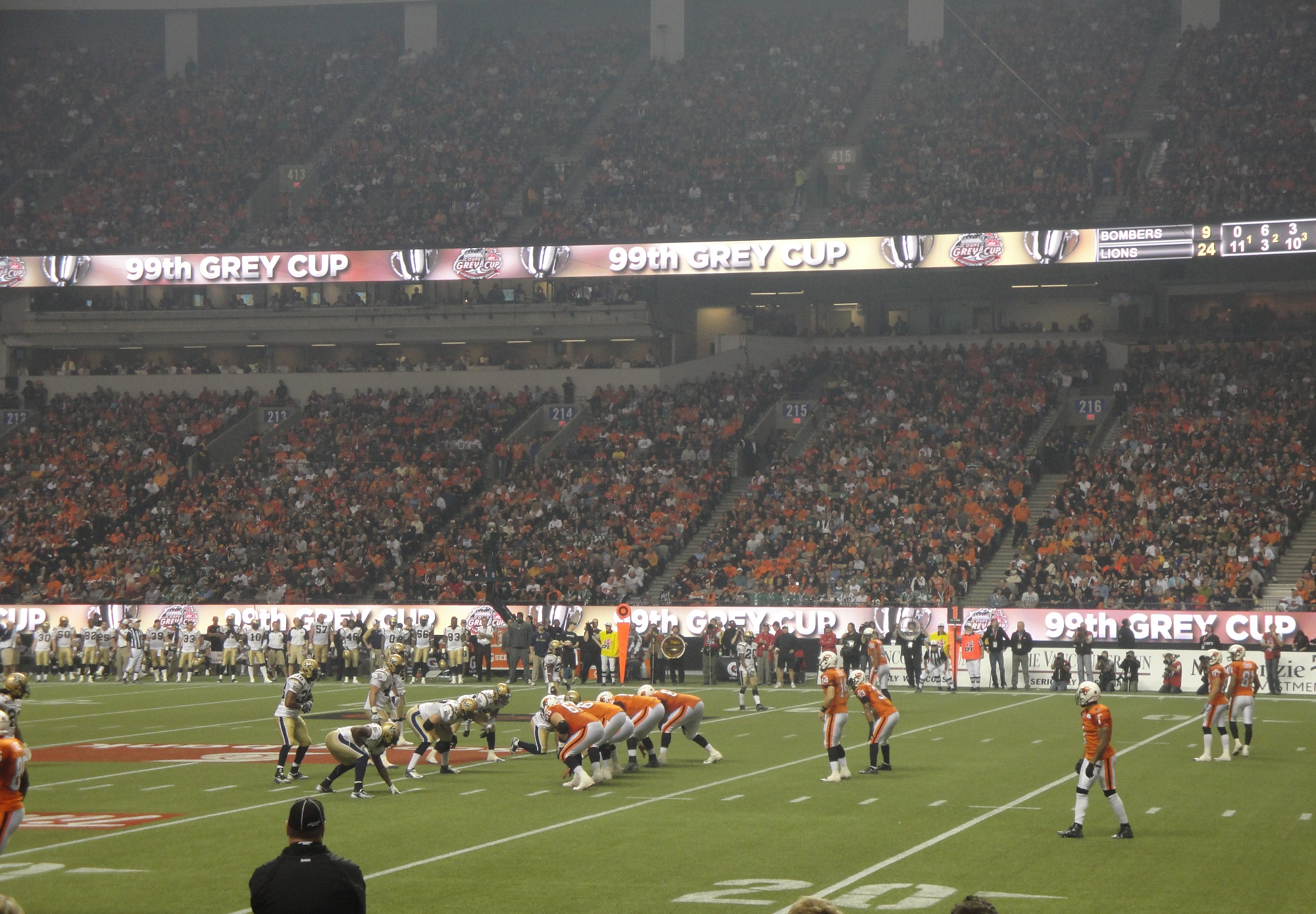
The BC Lions and the Winnipeg Blue Bombers line up during the 99th Grey Cup at BC Place

The British Columbia (BC) Lions have played in the Canadian Football League since 1954, and have won the Grey Cup six times, in 1964, 1985, 1994, 2000, 2006 and in 2011. Vancouver has hosted the Grey Cup championship fourteen times, most recently in 2011. The Lions play their home games at BC Place Stadium in downtown Vancouver, having previously played at Empire Stadium in East Vancouver until the end of the 1982 season.

==== Vancouver Canadians ====
The Vancouver Canadians play in the High-A West of the Minor League Baseball (MiLB). The Canadians play their home games at Scotiabank Field at Nat Bailey Stadium and are affiliated with the Toronto Blue Jays of Major League Baseball. Minor league baseball has a long history in Vancouver, including the Vancouver Beavers, the Vancouver Capilanos, an earlier incarnation of the Canadians and the Vancouver Mounties; both the latter two played in the Class AAA Pacific Coast League. Vancouver has been recently suggested as a potential expansion site for a Major League Baseball team although it is possible they would need a specific stadium rather than playing their home games at BC Place Stadium in downtown Vancouver. (Link)

==== Vancouver Canucks ====
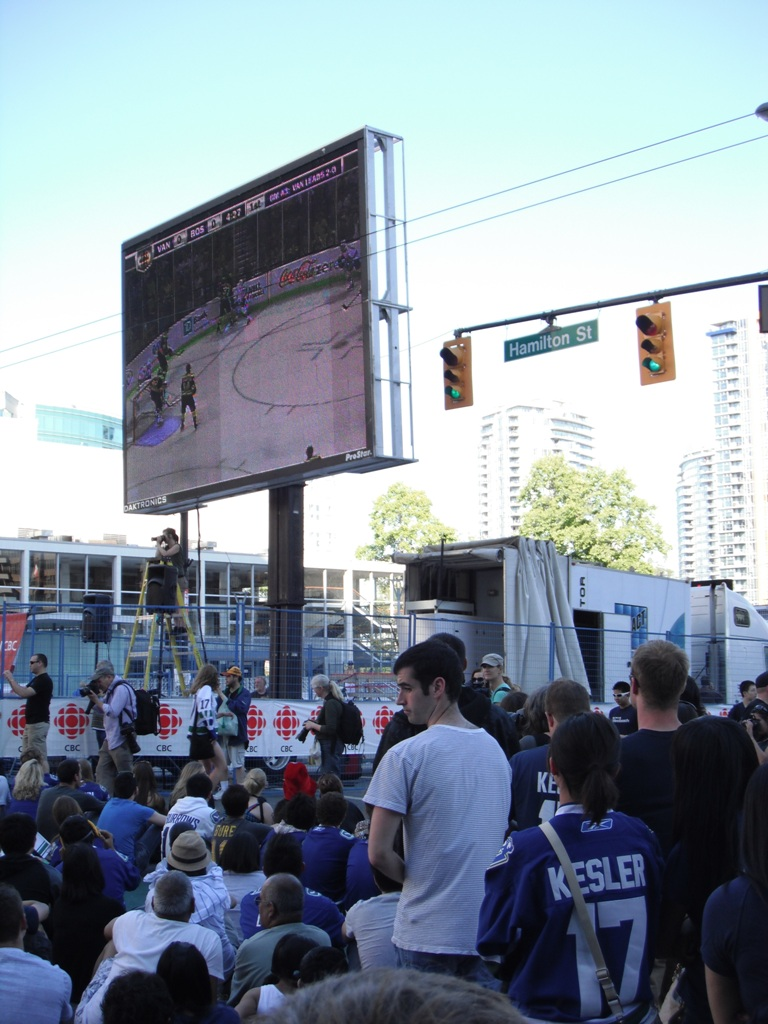
Spectators at Hamilton Street and West Georgia Street watch the Vancouver Canucks and the Boston Bruins play during the 2011 Stanley Cup Finals

The Vancouver Canucks have played in the National Hockey League since 1970, and have reached the Stanley Cup finals three times, in 1982, 1994 (the Canucks' 1994 run was unfortunately marred by the 1994 Stanley Cup riot) and 2011 (which again incited the 2011 Stanley Cup riot after the Canucks' loss to Boston). The Canucks play their home games at Rogers Arena, having previously played at the Pacific Coliseum until 1995. Previous incarnations of the Canucks played in the Pacific Coast Hockey League and Western Hockey League and won multiple championships. The Vancouver Blazers, a World Hockey Association team, attempted to compete with the Canucks between 1973 and 1975, but moved to Calgary thereafter. An early professional hockey team known as the Vancouver Millionaires won the Stanley Cup in 1915.

==== Vancouver Warriors ====
The Vancouver Warriors are a box lacrosse team in the National Lacrosse League. The team moved from Everett, Washington for the 2014 NLL season. Between 2014 and 2017, the team (then known as the Vancouver Stealth) were based in the Vancouver suburb of Langley, British Columbia, with home games played at the Langley Events Centre (LEC). In 2018, the team was purchased by Canucks Sports & Entertainment, who relocated the team to Rogers Place in Vancouver, and announced that they would be rebranding the team as the Vancouver Warriors for the 2018-19 season.

==== Vancouver Whitecaps FC ====
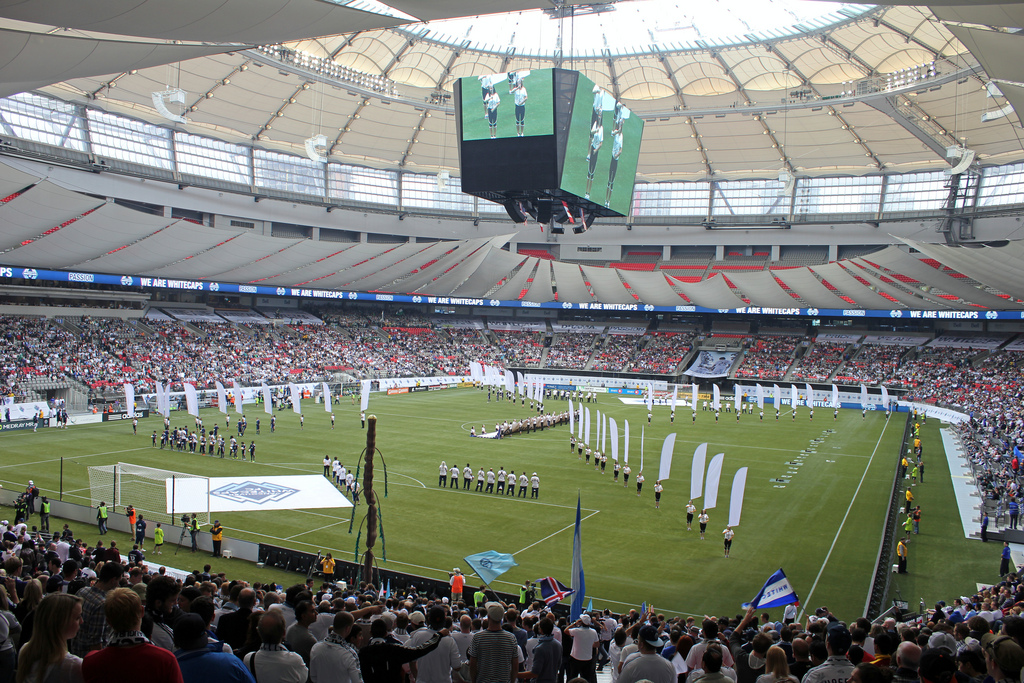
Ceremonies prior to a game between the Vancouver Whitecaps and the Portland Timbers at BC Place

In the 2011 season, the Vancouver Whitecaps FC joined Major League Soccer. The squad plays their home games in a renovated BC Place Stadium.

==== Vancouver Knights ====
The Vancouver Knights were one of the inaugural teams in the Global T20 Canada Twenty20 cricket tournament. The team does not have a designated home venue, playing all their matches at Brampton, Ontario. They were the inaugural champions, having won in 2018.

==== Vancouver Rise FC ====
Vancouver Rise FC joined the Northern Super League in 2025, the top division of women's soccer in Canada, and won the inaugural Diana B. Matheson Cup on November 15, 2025.

==== Vancouver Goldeneyes ====
The Vancouver Goldeneyes joined the Professional Women's Hockey League in 2025 as the league's first expansion team.

==== Former teams ====
The expansion Vancouver Grizzlies of the National Basketball Association were one of the anchor tenants of GM Place upon its completion in 1995, but moved to Memphis, Tennessee after just six years of operations in Vancouver. Professional basketball has been rumoured to return to Vancouver, most recently in the form of the Vancouver Dragons of the Continental Basketball Association, but has yet to establish itself. Vancouver continues to have a huge interest in acquiring a full-time National Basketball Association team and having them play their home games at Rogers Arena. Vancouver has also had professional lacrosse (Vancouver Ravens, National Lacrosse League, 2001-2004) and roller hockey (Vancouver Voodoo, Roller Hockey International, 1993-1996) teams. The Vancouver Blazers of the World Hockey Association played in the Pacific Coliseum for two seasons (1973/74 and 1974/75).

The Vancouver Royal Canadians were an association football team based in Vancouver, British Columbia, Canada that played in the United Soccer Association. The league was made up of teams imported almost entirely from Scotland and England. The Vancouver club was actually Sunderland A.F.C. of English Football League.

Following the 1967 season, the USA merged with the National Professional Soccer League to form the North American Soccer League with the teams from the former USA having to create their rosters from scratch. The San Francisco Golden Gate Gales franchise folded and their owners bought a controlling interest in the Royal Canadians renaming them the Vancouver Royals. Their home field was Empire Stadium.

The Vancouver Nighthalks were a semi-professional ultimate team that competed in the Major League Ultimate association. They played home games at the Thunderbird Stadium at University of British Columbia until 2016 where they had suspended play after the MLU was suspended. The Vancouver Riptide played in the American Ultimate Disc League from 2013 to 2017 playing home games at the Burnaby Swangard Stadium. They folded after the 2017 AUDL Season due to a lack of attendance and sponsorship and are moving down to Portland for the 2020 season.

== Sporting events ==
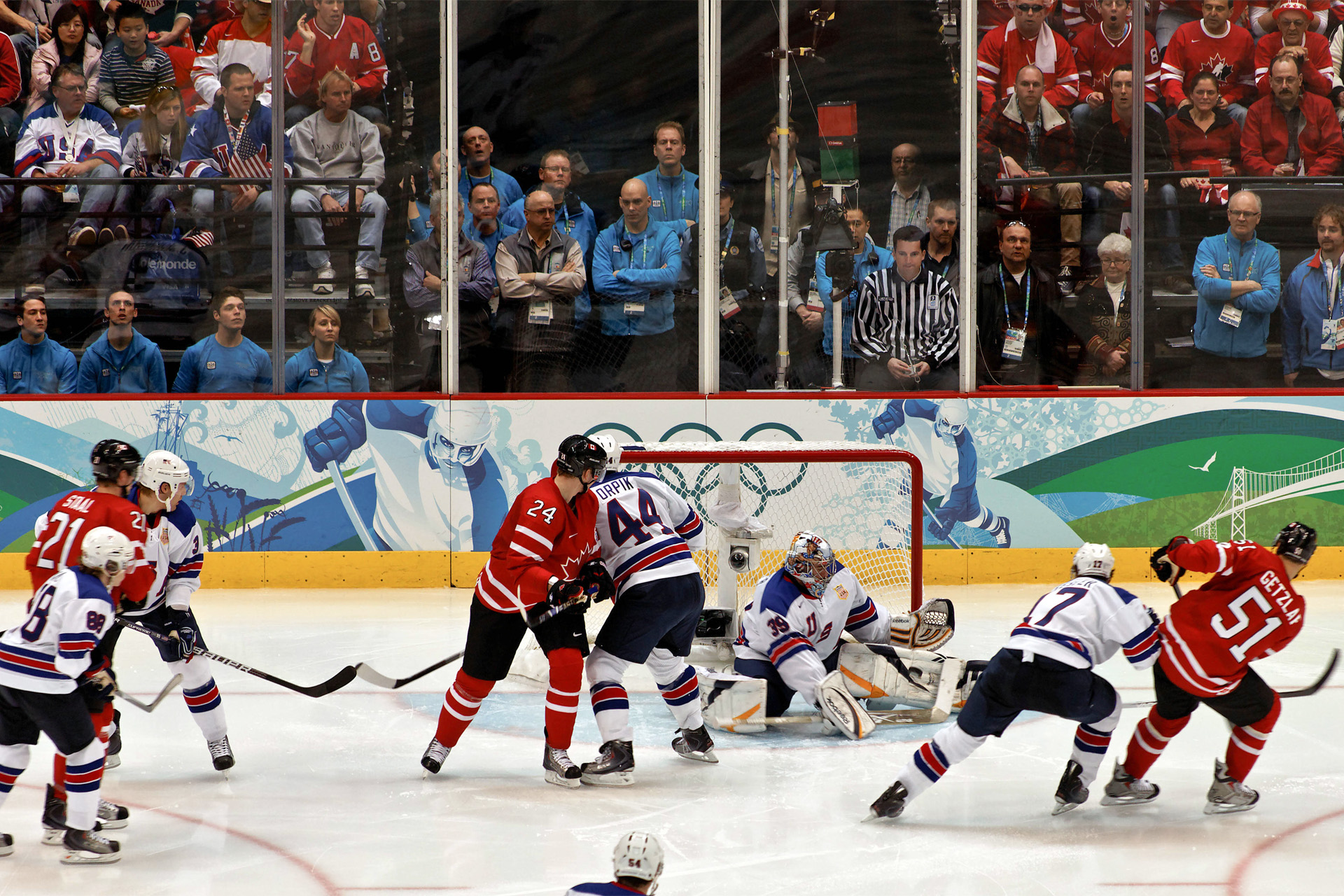
Ice hockey game between the Canadian and US men's national teams during the 2010 Winter Olympics in Vancouver

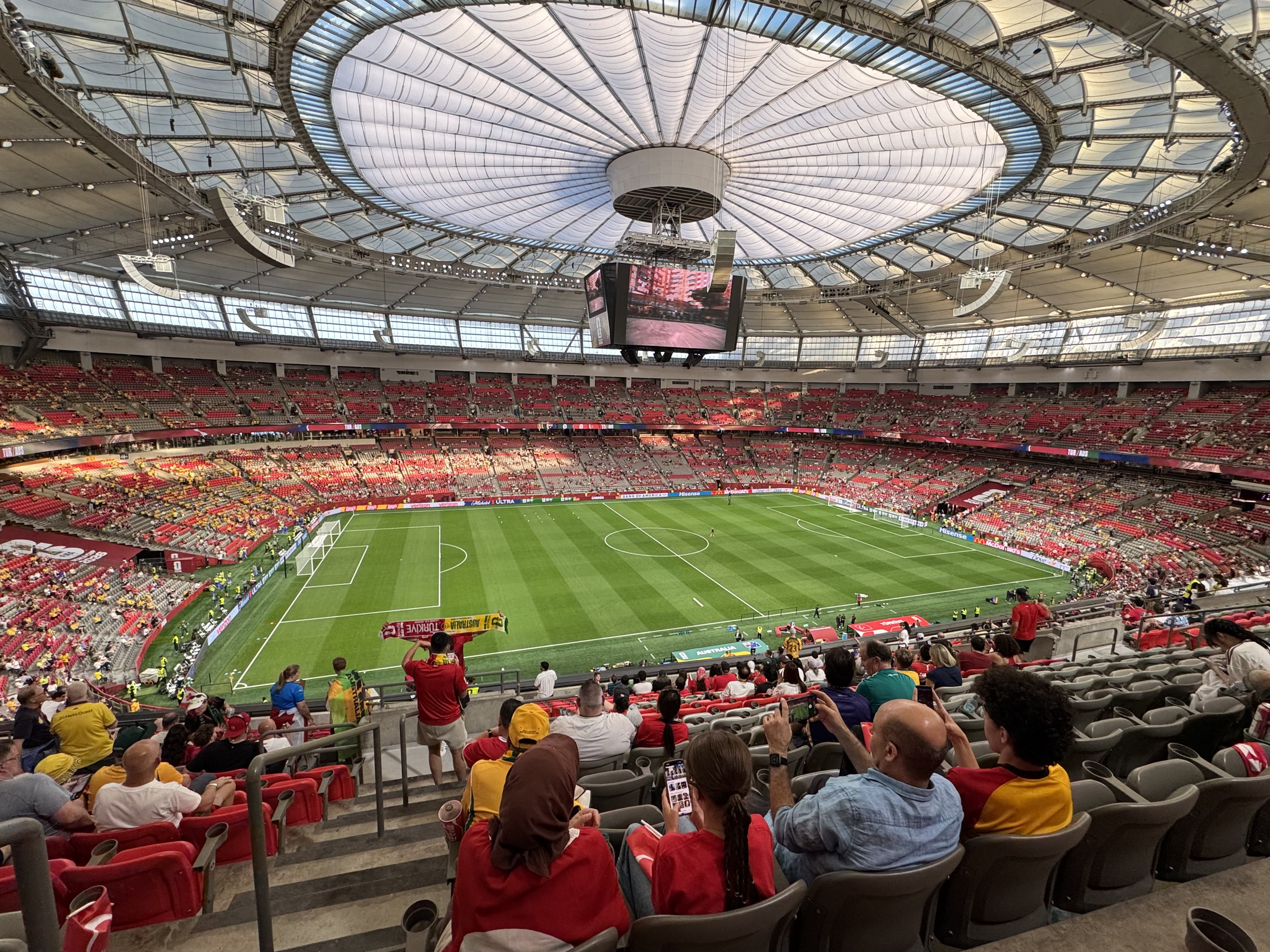
Inside BC Place prior to the Australia vs. Turkey match at the 2026 FIFA World Cup.

The Vancouver area has also hosted multiple BC Games amateur sports events. The Slam City Jam skateboarding championship was held in Vancouver from 1994 to 2005, and was set to return in 2008. Upcoming events include the 2008 World Ultimate and Guts Championship and the 2009 World Police and Fire Games.

Annual events include the Vancouver Marathon (42K/21K), the Vancouver Sun Run (a 10 km race), Vancouver Half-Marathon, Gastown Grand Prix, Canadian International Dragon Boat Festival, Vancouver Open and the Cloverdale Rodeo. Former annual events include the Molson Indy Vancouver, a Champ Car race held from 1990 to 2004; the British Columbia Derby held at Hastings Racecourse from 1946 to 2025, and the Greater Vancouver Institutional, a golf tournament held from 1996 to 2010. The Canadian Open, a golf tournament which alternates venues annually, was last held in Vancouver in 2011.

The 2010 Winter Olympics and Paralympics took place in Vancouver, and was organized by what was called VANOC (Vancouver Organizing Committee for the 2010 Olympic and Paralympic Winter Games). The 2010 Winter Olympics was the third Olympics hosted by Canada, and the first by the province of British Columbia. In the 2010 Winter Olympics, the mascots were Miga, a mythical sea bear, part orca and part kermode bear, Quatchi, a sasquatch, and Sumi, an animal guardian spirit with the wings of the Thunderbird and legs of a black bear. Miga and Quatchi were the mascots for the Olympics while Sumi was the mascot for the Paralympics.

Vancouver hosted multiple matches during the 2026 FIFA World Cup.

Other past sports events hosted in Vancouver include:

- 1954 British Empire and Commonwealth Games
- 1973 Canada Summer Games
- 1989 World Police and Fire Games
- 1990 Gay Games
- 2006 World Junior Ice Hockey Championships
- 2007 Memorial Cup
- 2007 FIFA U-20 World Cup held at Swangard Stadium
- 2008 World Ultimate and Guts Championships
- 2009 World Police and Fire Games
- 2015 FIFA Women's World Cup held at BC Place
- 2019 World Junior Ice Hockey Championships held at Rogers Arena
- 2023 CEBL Championship Weekend
- 2023 Laver Cup
- 2025 Invictus Games
- 2025 U SPORTS Basketball Championships

== Facilities ==
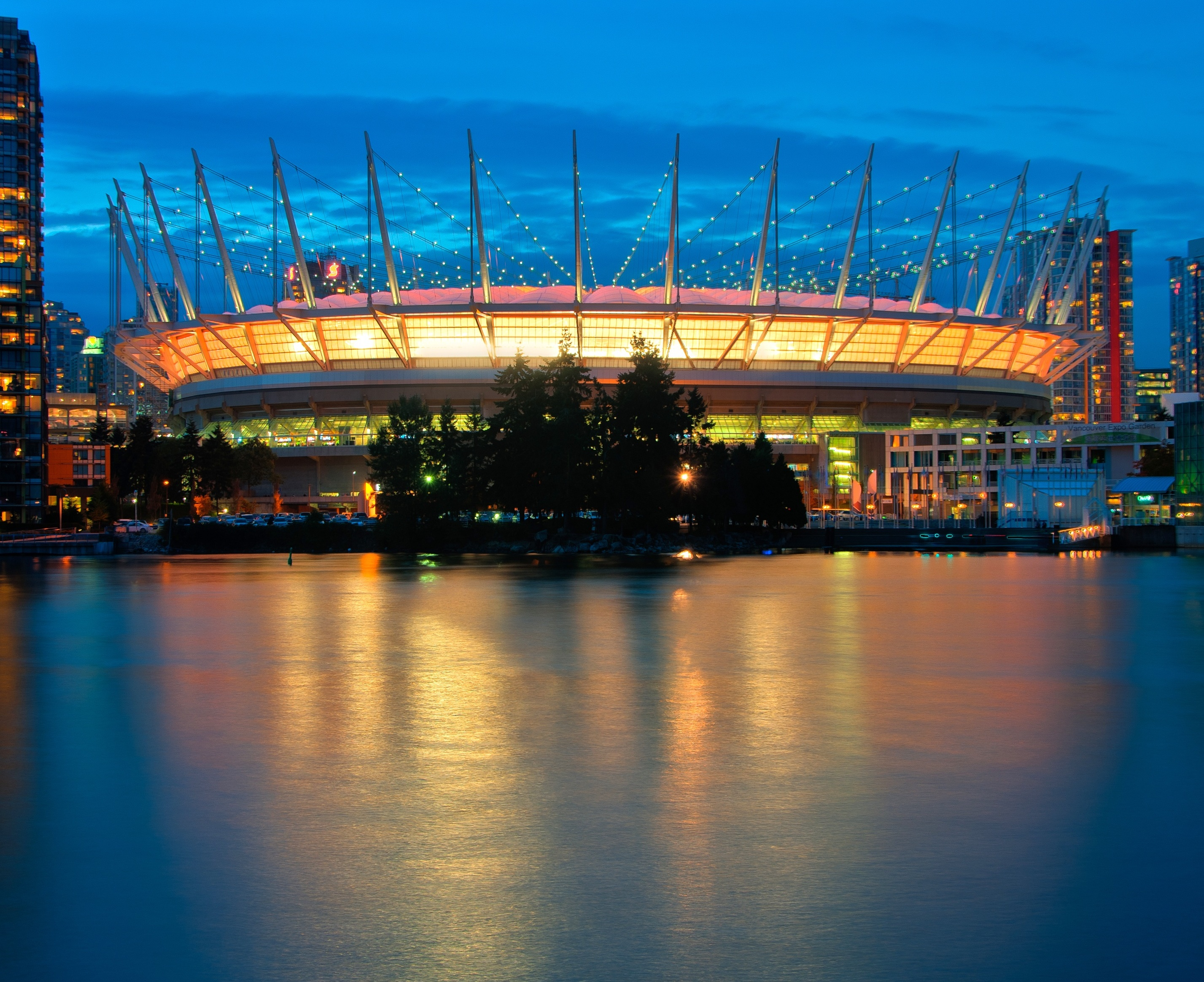
BC Place, home venue for the BC Lions and Vancouver Whitecaps

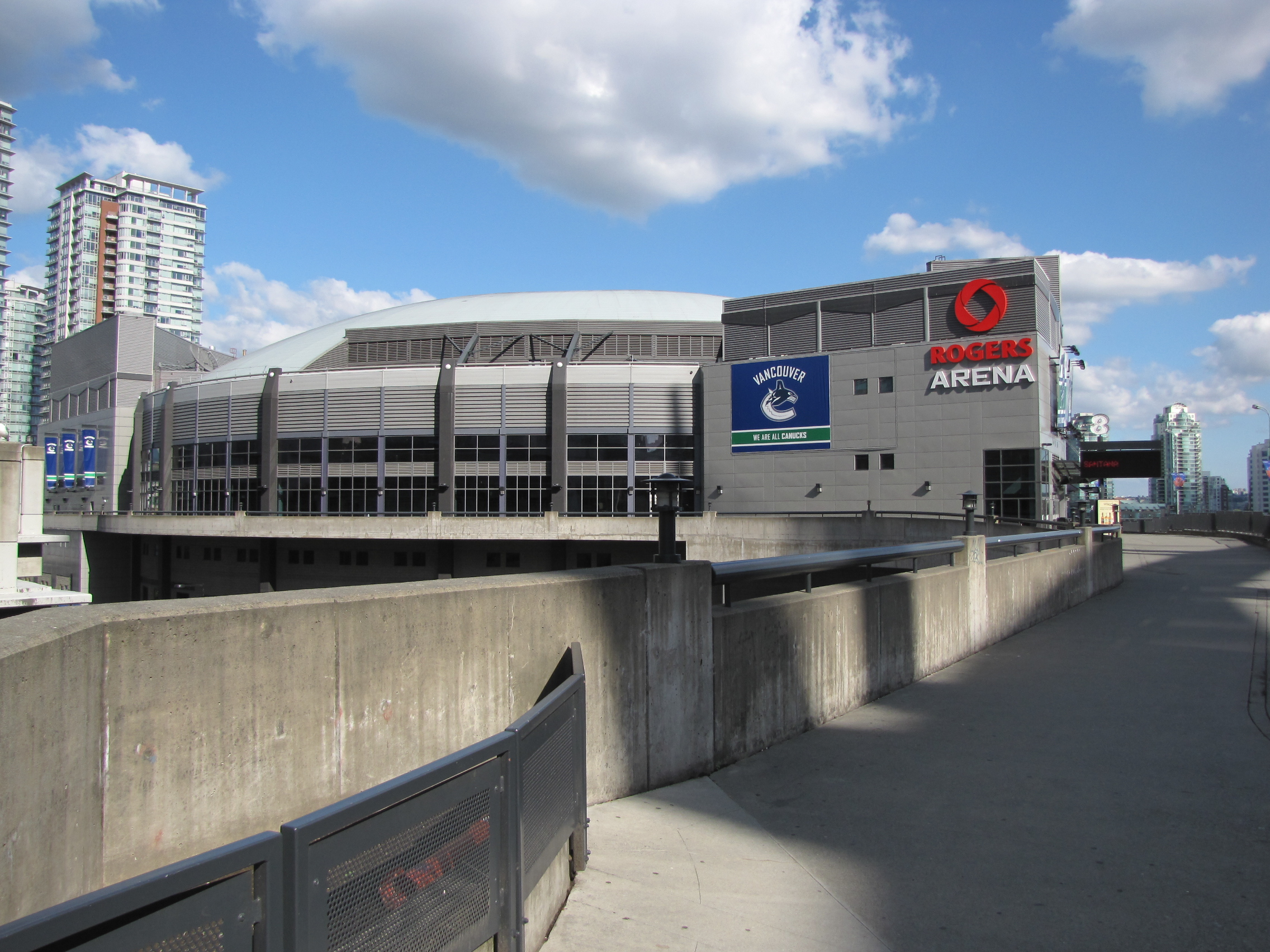
Rogers Arena, home venue for the Vancouver Canucks, Vancouver Warriors, and former home of the Vancouver Grizzlies

Major sports facilities in Vancouver are Rogers Arena (a.k.a. GM Place, Canada Hockey Place), BC Place, the Pacific Coliseum, the PNE Agrodome and Nat Bailey Stadium. BC Place is also home to the BC Sports Hall of Fame, founded in 1966. There are many other facilities throughout the city and surrounding area, including 8 Rinks in Burnaby, the Canucks' main practice venue.

The relatively mild climate of Vancouver, its extensive parkland, and close proximity to ocean, mountains, rivers and lakes provides it with a number of areas for outdoor sporting activities, both competitive and recreational. The area is a popular destination for outdoor sports and recreation, including on and off-road cycling, skateboarding, hiking, alpine and cross-country skiing, snowboarding, disc sports, golf, and water sports. The nearby North Shore Mountains are home to three ski hills, Cypress Mountain, Grouse Mountain, and Mount Seymour; each are within 20 to 30 minutes (driving time) of downtown Vancouver.

Vancouver's iconic Seawall is the longest uninterrupted waterfront path in the world at 28km, stretching from the Vancouver Convention Centre near Stanley Park, all the way to Spanish Banks Park towards the city's western edge. Its length, friendliness to pedestrians, and iconic views have made it a popular destination for Vancouver's many run clubs. These free public facilities, plus a mild climate relative to the rest of Canada, have led to a rapid spread these urban running groups, with the city now being home to several.

== Parks ==
- Charleson Park

== Media ==
Vancouver's major daily newspapers, the Vancouver Sun and Vancouver Province, provide extensive coverage of local sports. CKNW was historically the main radio broadcaster of Vancouver's sports teams, but CKST, an all-sports station founded in 2001, broadcasts the Canucks, Lions, Whitecaps and Canadians as of 2007. On television, most events are carried by Sportsnet Pacific, TSN, CBC, or Shaw TV. Additionally, CTV presently broadcasts Seattle Seahawks games through its partnership with the NFL.

== Famous athletes ==
The Vancouver area has produced a number of notable athletes, including Cam Neely (born in Comox, raised in Lower Mainland), Joe Sakic, Cliff Ronning, Milan Lucic, Mathew Barzal, Ryan Nugent-Hopkins, Morgan Rielly, Carey Price, Martin Jones, Brent Seabrook, Ryan Johansen and Paul Kariya (hockey); Larry Walker, Justin Morneau, Jeff Francis, and Adam Loewen (baseball); Bob Lenarduzzi, Domenic Mobilio, Emilio Reuben, Brian Budd (born in Toronto, raised in Vancouver) and Christine Sinclair (soccer); Lui Passaglia, Paris Jackson and Adam Braidwood (football); Harry Jerome, Charmaine Crooks, Percy Williams (Track & Field); Steve Nash (born in South Africa, raised in Vancouver) (basketball)

== See also ==
Media related to Sports in Vancouver at Wikimedia Commons

- Baseball in Vancouver
- Vancouver Cross Country
