= Hinge Park =

Park in Vancouver, British Columbia, Canada

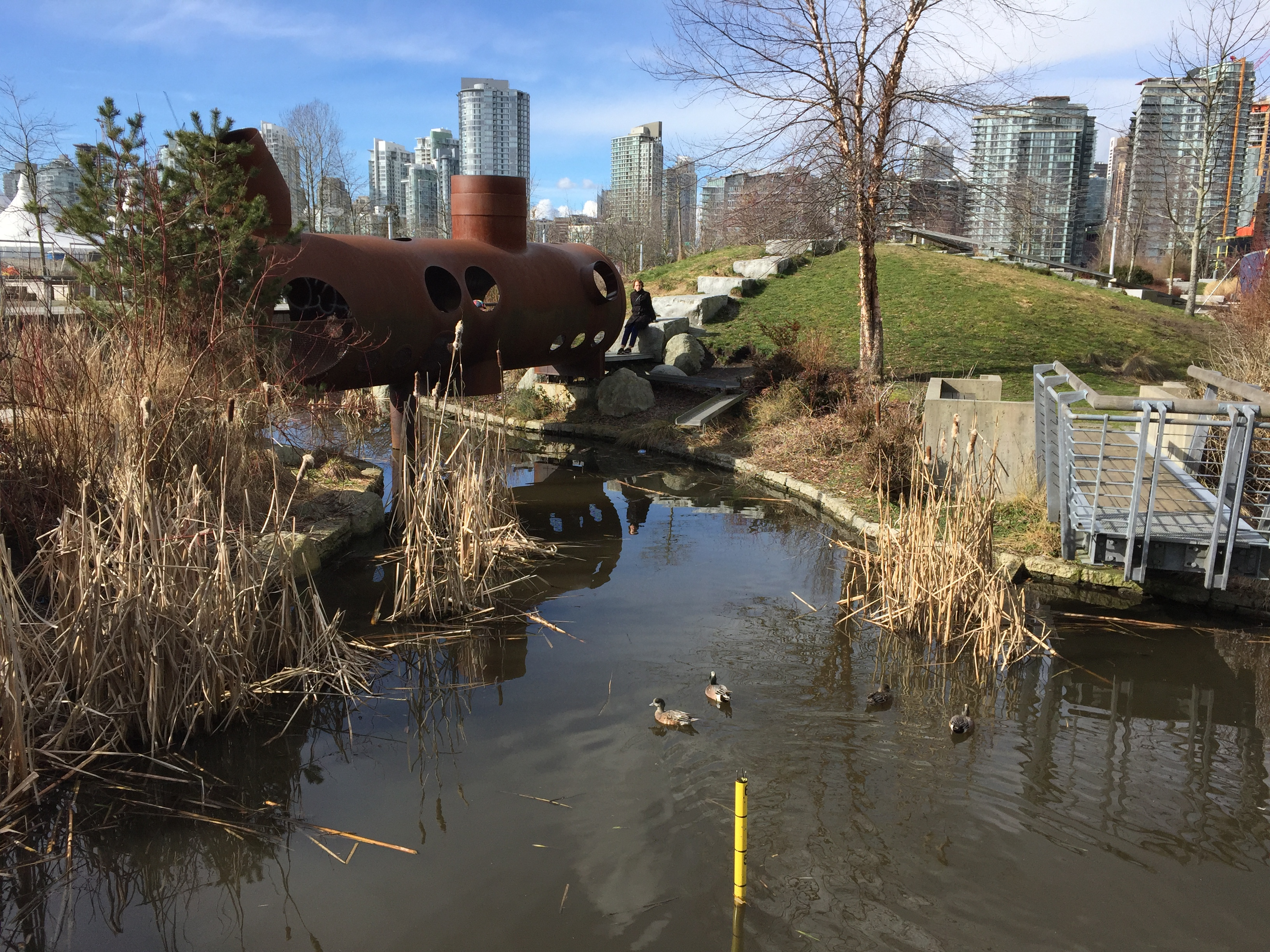
- North View of Hinge Park

- Location within Greater Vancouver Regional District
- Location: Vancouver, British Columbia
- Coordinates: 49°16′17″N 123°06′38″W
- Area: 2.3 acres (0.93 ha)
- Established: 2009
- Website: covapp.vancouver.ca/parkfinder/parkdetail.aspx?inparkid=240

Hinge Park is a naturalized wetland park in the city of Vancouver, British Columbia. Hinge Park covers 2.3 acres and also connects to Habitat Island which covers around 1.5 acres. The park includes a trail in Habitat Island, a walking/biking trail along the shoreline of False Creek, public art installations, picnic tables, benches, docks, a children's play area, a bridge constructed from sewer pipe, a water pump with metal runnels at the top of a small hill, and the Olympic Village dog park.

== History ==
The name of this park is based on the bend in Vancouver's street grid, where Cambie St. intersects with West 2nd Ave. This park was created as one of the amenities for the 2010 Winter Olympics athletes. It was designed to give historical reference to its former use as an industrial land, hence the bridge constructed from sewer pipe. The industrial land was named as a City Works Yard that was built in the 1920s which included an incinerator that assisted residents with waste disposal. The unsorted waste was burned and left highly contaminated the soil. This led to a reform of the land, and some suggested that the City Works Yard be made into an infrastructure theme park to educate people about the environmental effects of infrastructure. The park was designed to clean storm water runoff before it reached the ocean. The park is a naturalized wetland, meaning this area of Vancouver was not originally a wetland environment prior to its construction. However, the wetland park has seemingly incorporated itself into the ecosystem and has become an important habitat to preserve wildlife.

== Ecology ==
=== Habitat Island ===
Habitat Island or Habitat Compensation Island was intended to be a shoreline created due to a Department of Fisheries and Oceans policy, in which requires a shoreline to be created when a portion of natural waterfront is lost to urban development. Habitat Island was constructed with left over excavation material (soil, rocks, and sand). As the island’s name implies, it provides a variety of small ecological habitats for a wide variety of plants and animals to thrive from.

=== Wildlife ===
The creation of Hinge Park and Habitat Island has incorporated freshwater wetlands, rocky inter-tidal zones, and shoreline forest habitats into the dense urban environment of Olympic Village. These novel habitats have promoted biodiversity by becoming a unique gathering spot for wildlife. Wildlife sightings in Hinge Park and Habitat Island include coyotes, river otters, raccoons, herring, beavers, and several species of waterfowl. Earlier in April 2013, a pair of beavers were first sighted in Hinge Park and have made the stormwater-fed wetland their home. Since establishing a local lodge in January 2015, the pair of beavers have quickly gained popularity over social media and is loved by many locals in the community. Since July 2016, up to three baby beaver kits have been spotted living with their parents. The urban habitat of Hinge Park is smaller than the usual habitats that beavers occupy, meaning the amount of available resources to allow the beaver population to thrive will be challenging. Currently, there are no plans to capture, kill, or relocate the beaver family, however trees have been wrapped in wire mesh to reduce the number of trees taken down by the beavers.

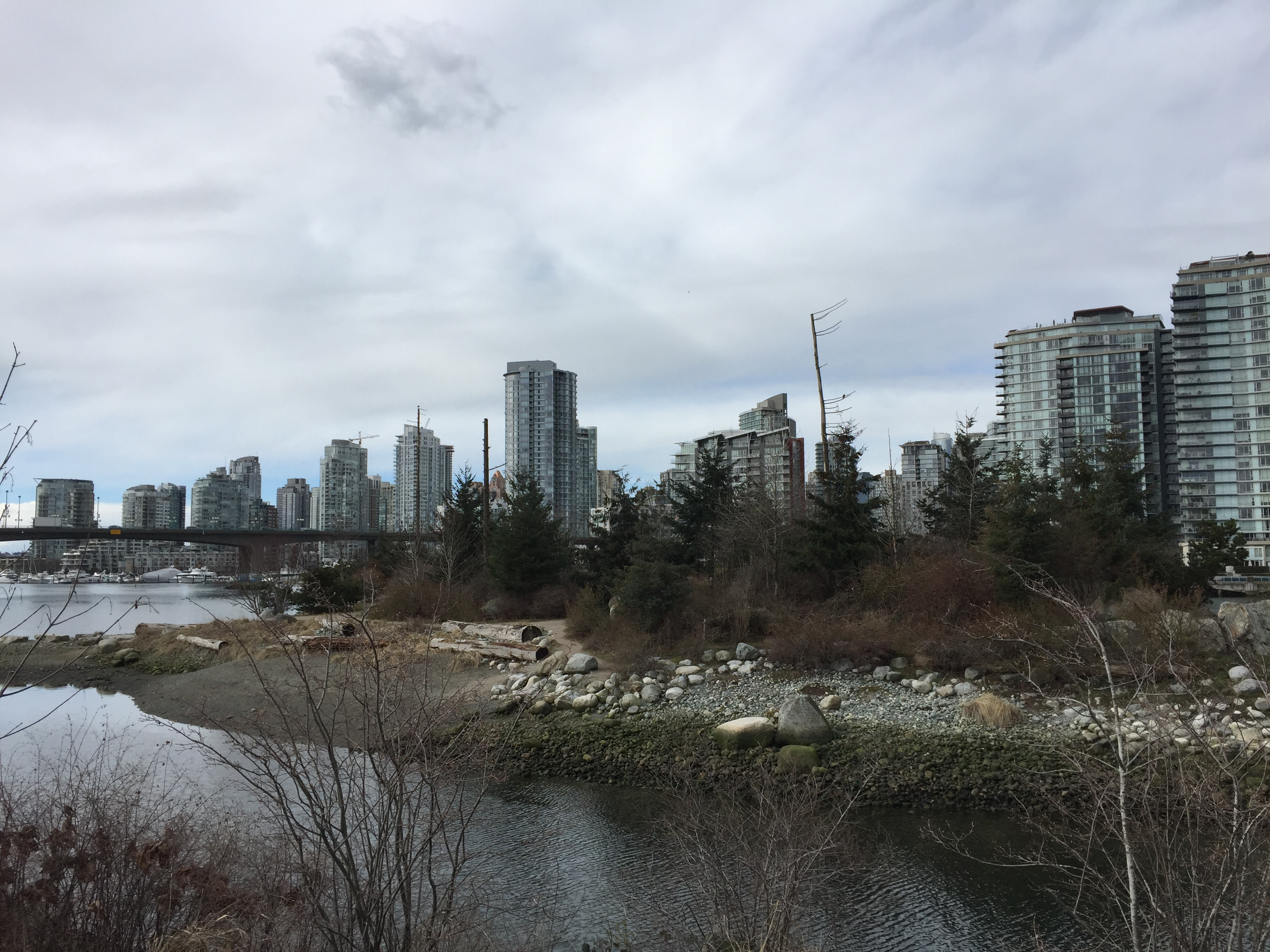
North view of Habitat Island from Hinge Park

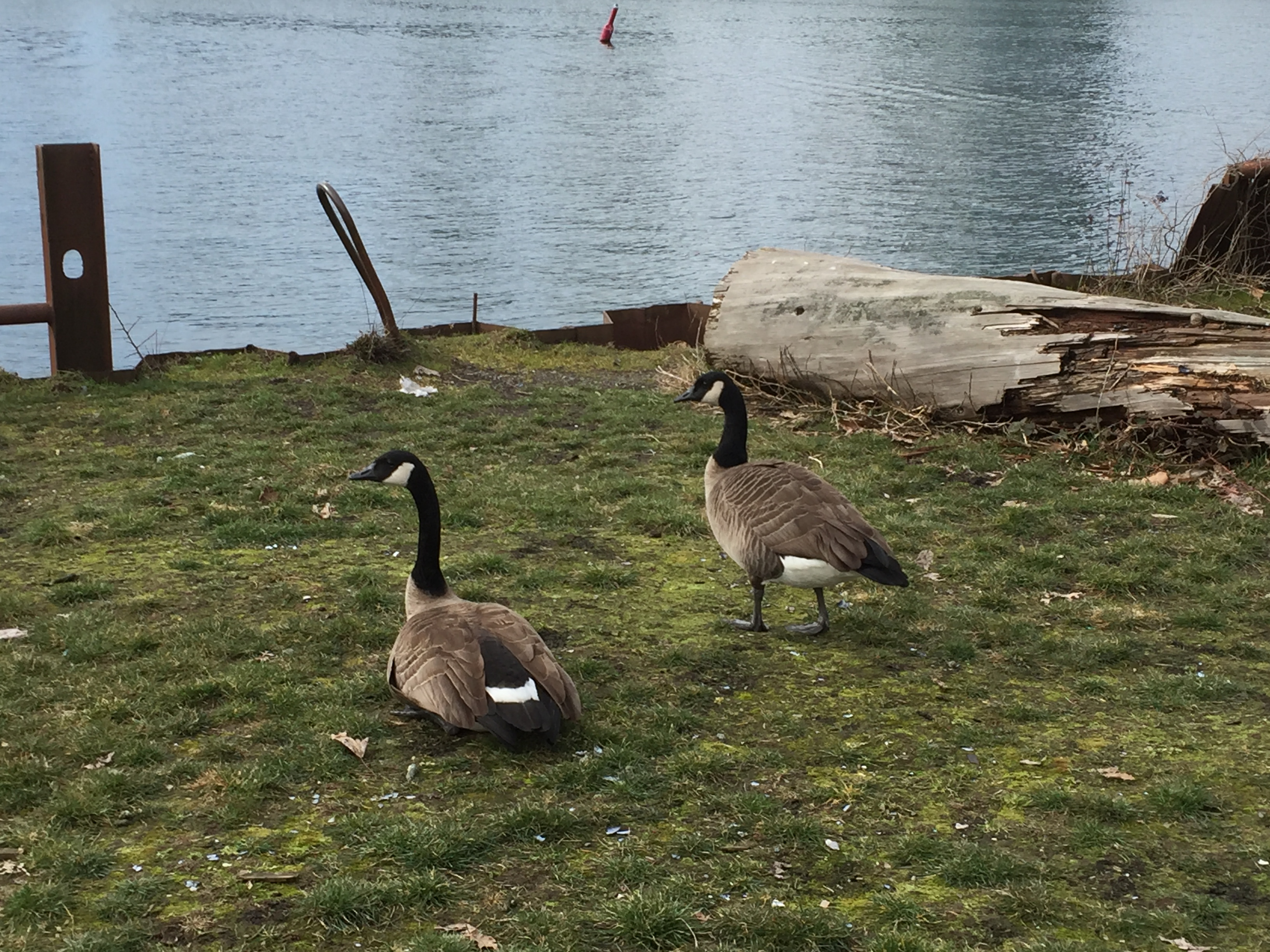
Geese on the north shore of Hinge Park

== Activities ==
Hinge Park includes a children's play area where there are a set of jungle ropes and a small climbing wall. Also, near the play area is a small hill with a slide, a water pump that can be used in the summer, and a big rusty tube bridge. Furthermore, there is a walking and biking trail that connects with the rest of False Creek trail. There is another trail that leads to Habitat Island which is located north of Hinge Park which give hikers a view of False Creek across the river. Other activities include a dog off-leash area for owners to allow their pets to run freely. There are various dog meet ups across the Lower Mainland and Hinge Park can be one of those meet up locations. Other amenities located in the park include outdoor picnic tables, benches, and available parking. Food/beverage services and public washrooms are not available at the park, however, these amenities are available at Olympic Village Square located one block west of Hinge Park.

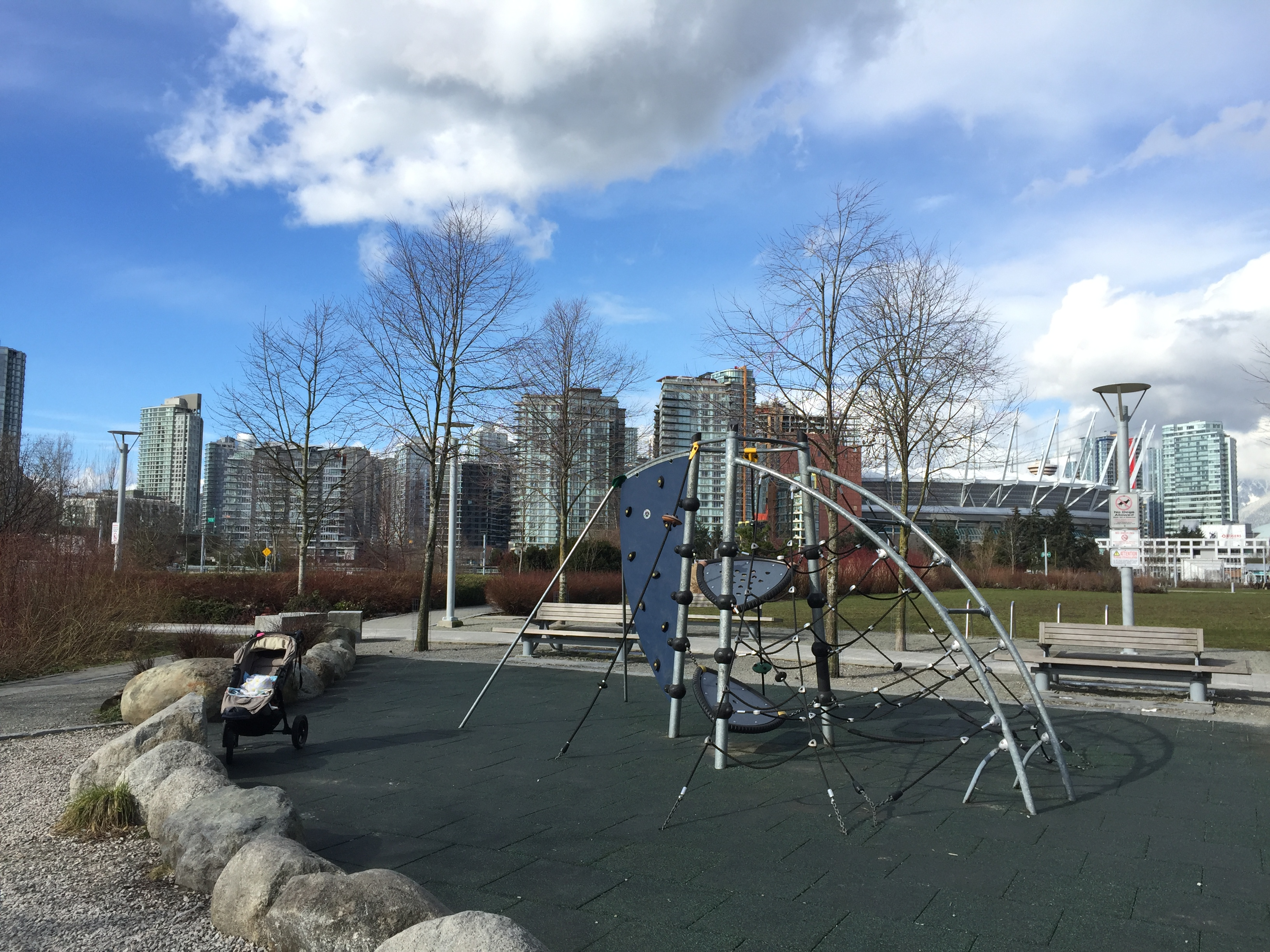
Children's playing area

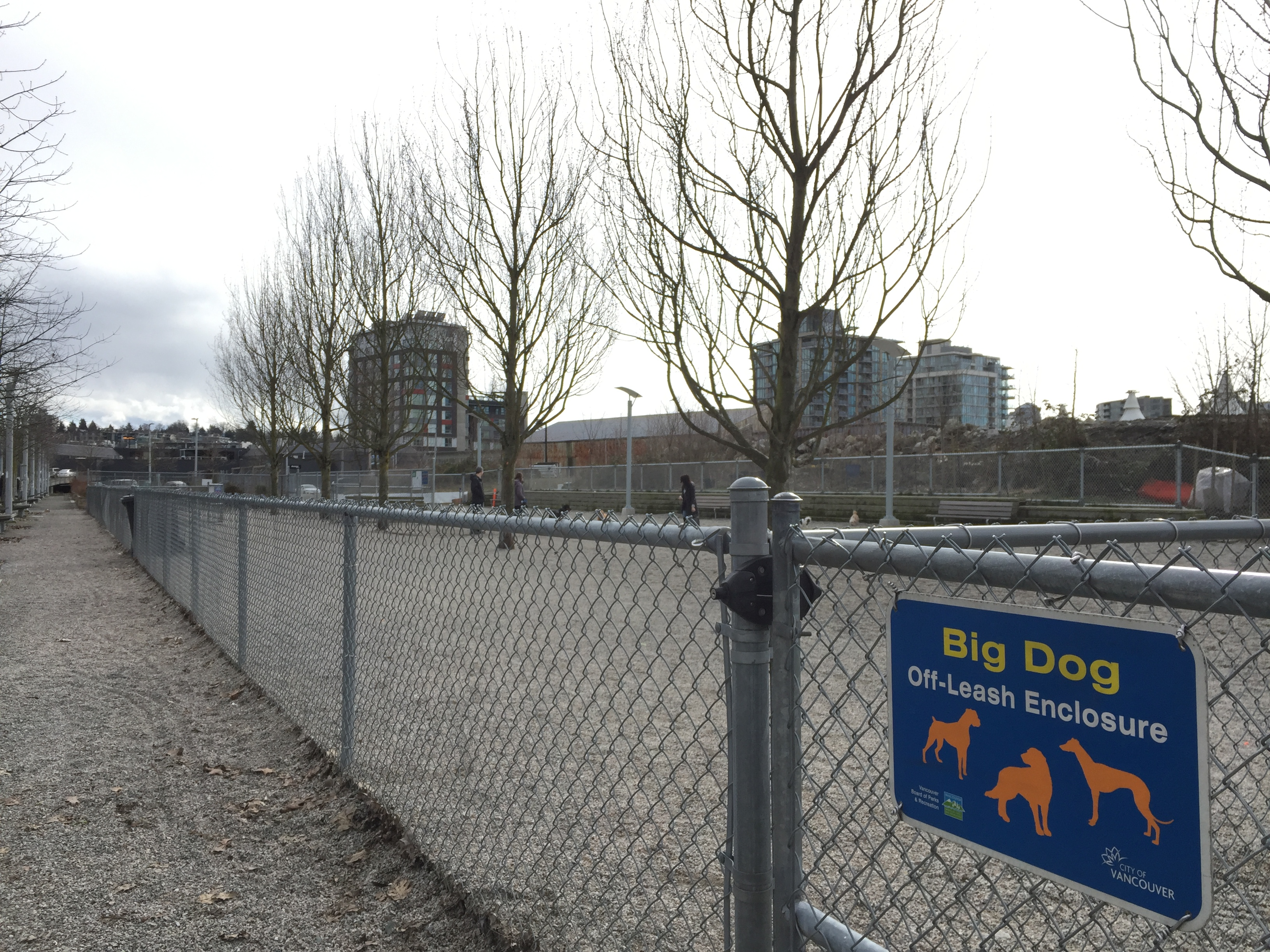
South view of the Dog Off-Leash Area

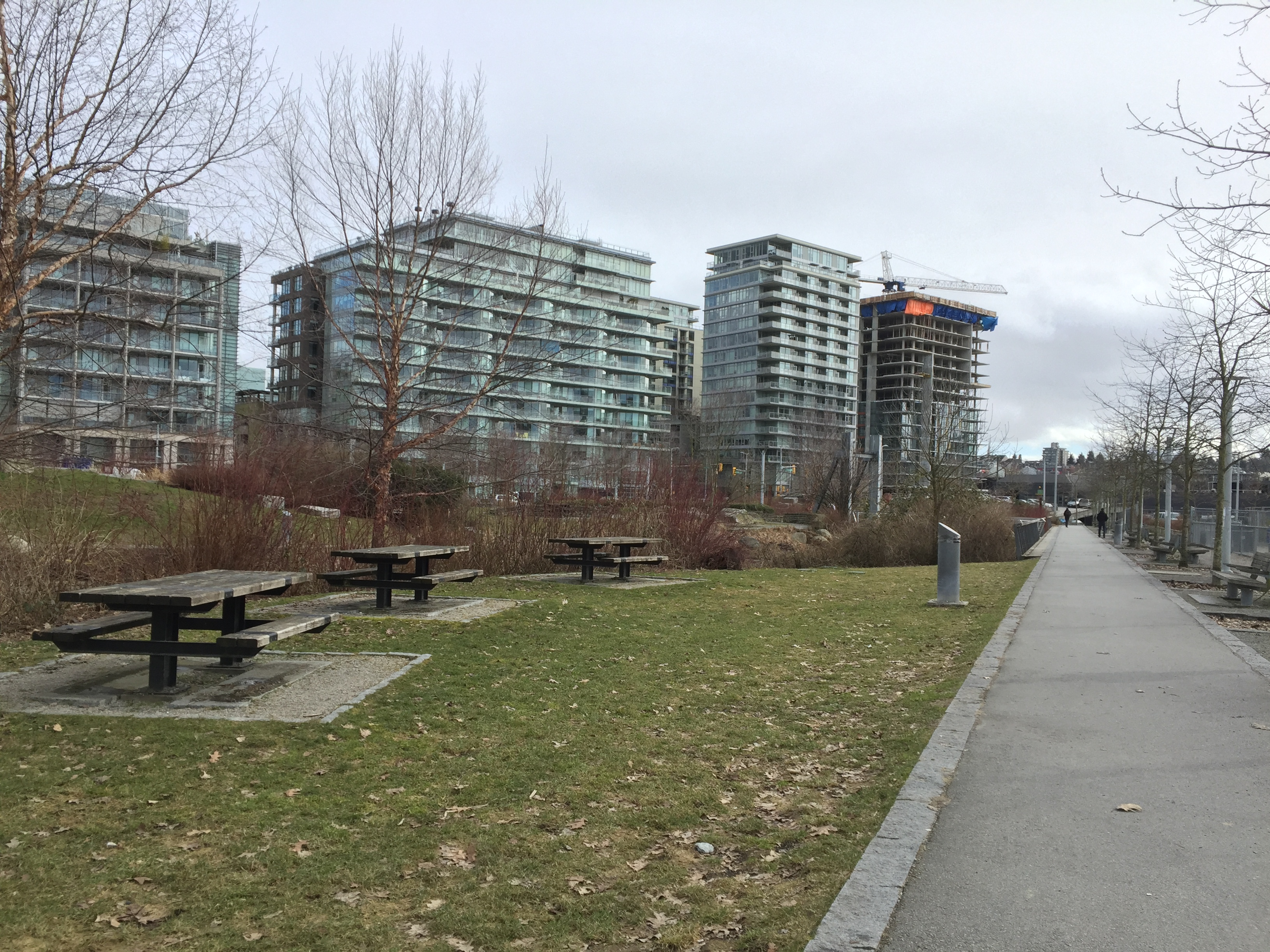
South view of picnic tables

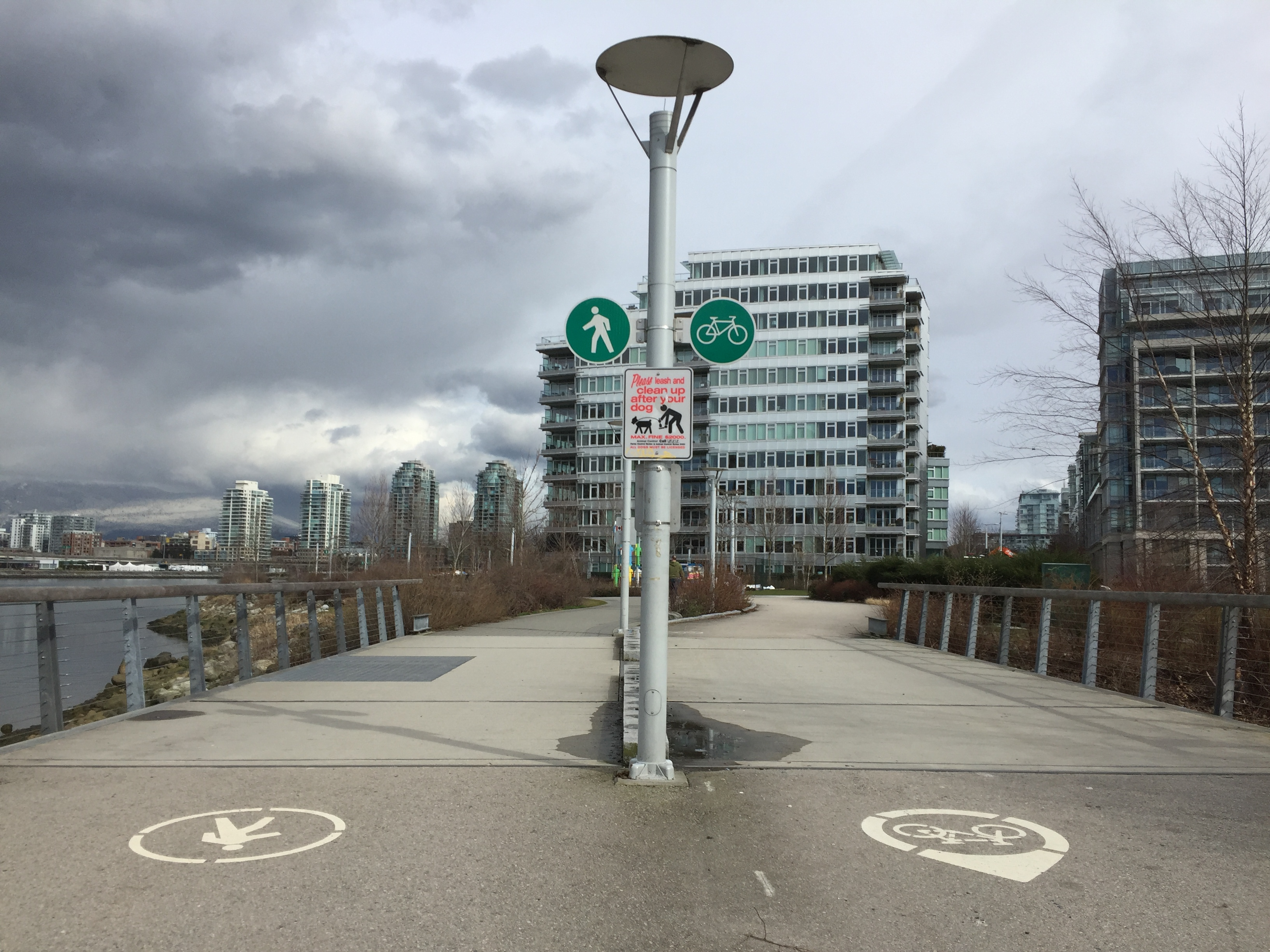
East view of False Creek Trail

== Directions ==
Hinge Park is located on the Northwest corner of 1st Ave. and Columbia St. in the neighbourhood of Mount Pleasant, Vancouver. Being a local community park, there are multiple points of access into Hinge Park including Athletes Way, Walter Hardwick Ave., and running/biking trails along the South edge border of False Creek. The park is approximately a 10-minute car drive from the Vancouver City Centre Canada Line SkyTrain station; the interior of Downtown Vancouver.

Alternatively, the park can be reached after a 10-minute walk from either the Olympic Village Canada Line SkyTrain station or the Main Street-Science World Expo Line SkyTrain station.

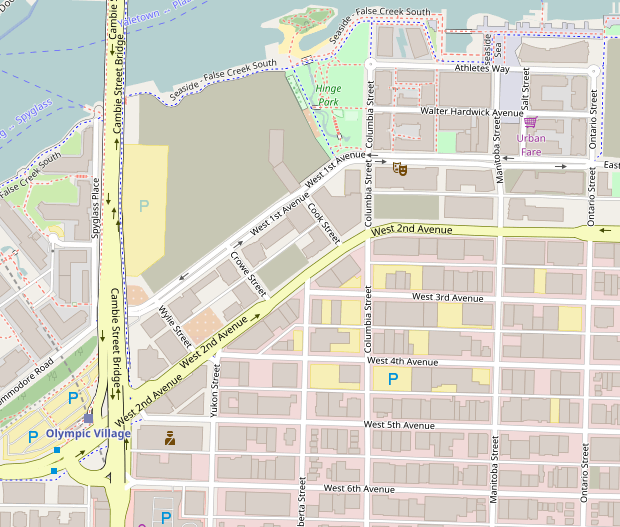
Map of Olympic VIllage Canada Line SkyTrain Station to Hinge Park

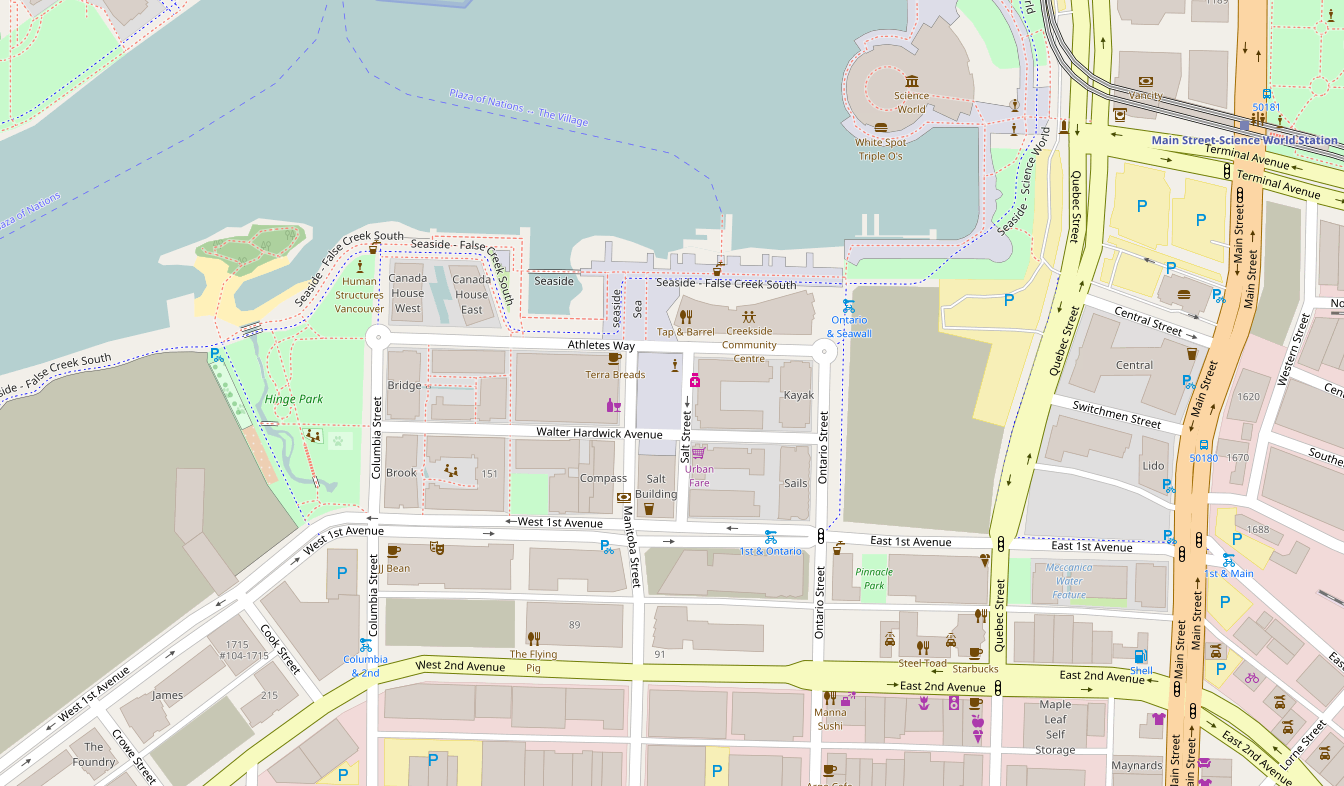
Geographical map of Hinge Park showing how it 'hinges' with the landscape and the adjacent Olympic Village Square

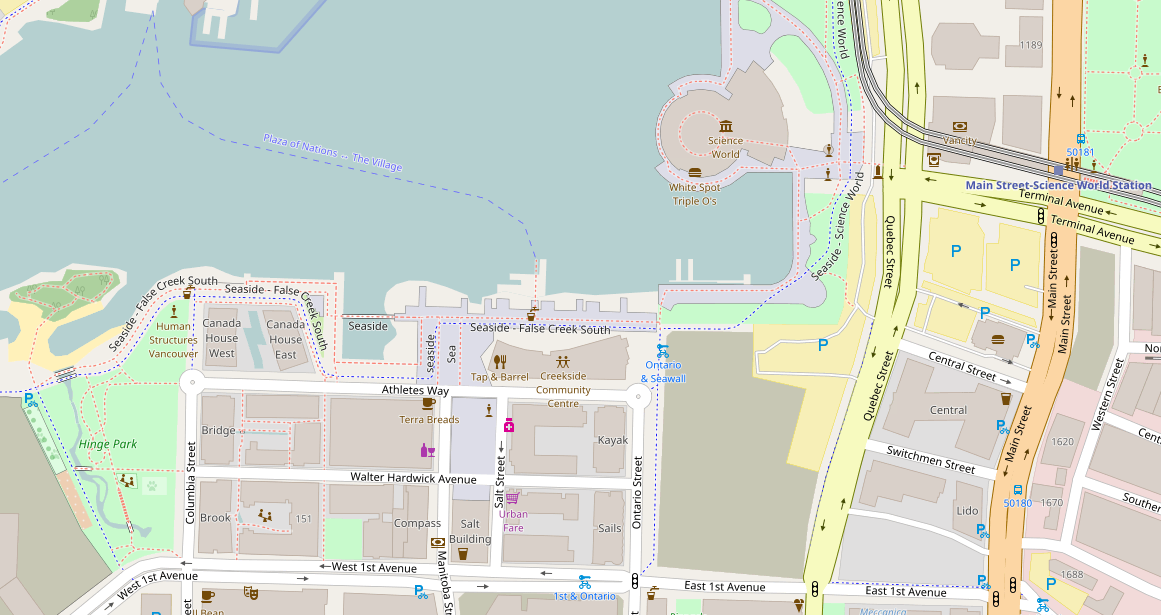
Map of Main Street-Science World Expo Line SkyTrain Station to Hinge Park

== See also ==
- 2010 Olympic Village
- False Creek
