= False Creek Friends Society =

Vancouver environmental organization

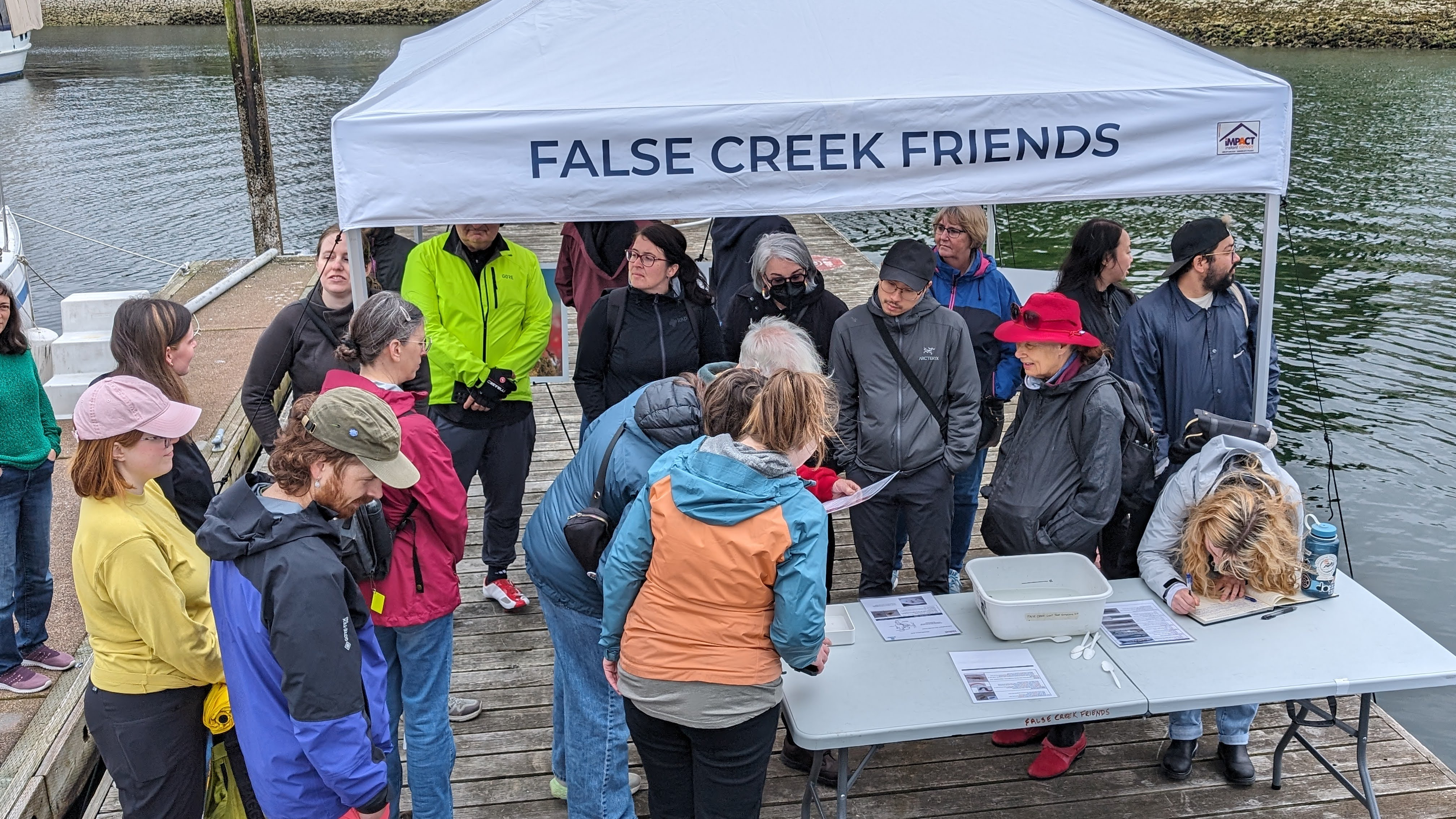
- Urban marine rehabilitation discussion at False Creek Friends project site
- Abbreviation: FCFS
- Formation: 2021
- Type: Environmental organization based in Canada
- Legal status: Active
- Purpose: Revivifying False Creek
- Headquarters: Vancouver, British Columbia, Canada
- Region served: False Creek
- Official language: English
- President: Zaida Schneider
- Website: falsecreekfriends.org

False Creek Friends Society (FCFS) is a registered nonprofit society whose goal is designation of False Creek in Vancouver as a National Urban Marine Park with Indigenous co-governance.

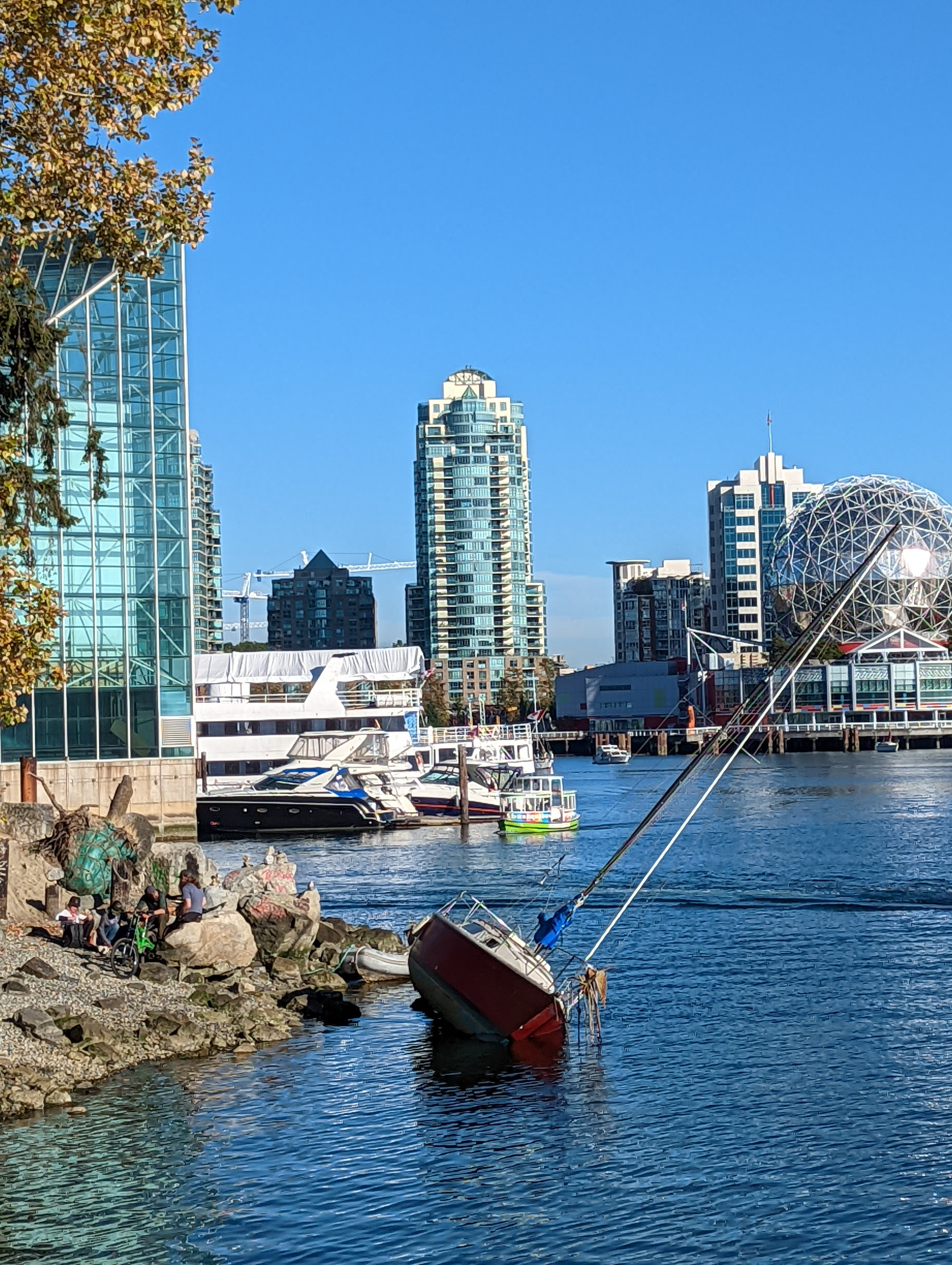
An abandoned vessel washes ashore near Science World in False Creek

== History ==
False Creek Friends was founded in 2021 by Zaida Schneider and Tim Bray.

FCFS worked in 2022 with the Hakai Institute in performing a "BioBlitz", a multidimensional survey of marine life, in False Creek. The findings were summarized in 2024 in the report False Creek: Past, Present, Future.

FCFS has been an active supporter of the campaign to address the problem of derelict boats in False Creek.

== Partnerships ==
FCFS has partnered with the University of British Columbia on several projects, including its Sustainability Ambassadors Program and its Partnering in Research conference, with Emily Carr University of Art and Design on exploration of "Meanings Through Design", and with Simon Fraser University on a "Community Ocean Futures" project.

In 2023, FCFS supported Nature Vancouver's False Creek Oyster survey, funded by the BC Naturalist Foundation.

== Honors and awards ==
FCFS received a City of Vancouver "Climate Action Grant" in 2023 for the purpose of "Connecting people, science, and action to enhance the sustainability of False Creek’s marine environment".

FCFS is the subject of Waterbodies: Kinship in False Creek, which won the Best Canadian Short award at the 2024 BC Environmental Film Festival.

== Studies ==
In September 2025, Metro Vancouver Regional District launched a collaborative study in partnership with the City of Vancouver, FCFS, and the Raincoast Conservation Association, to study details of pollution in False Creek, with the aim of determining how to clean up and, in the future, protect False Creek from further pollution.
