= False Creek =

Inlet in Vancouver, Canada

- Faux ruisseau (French)
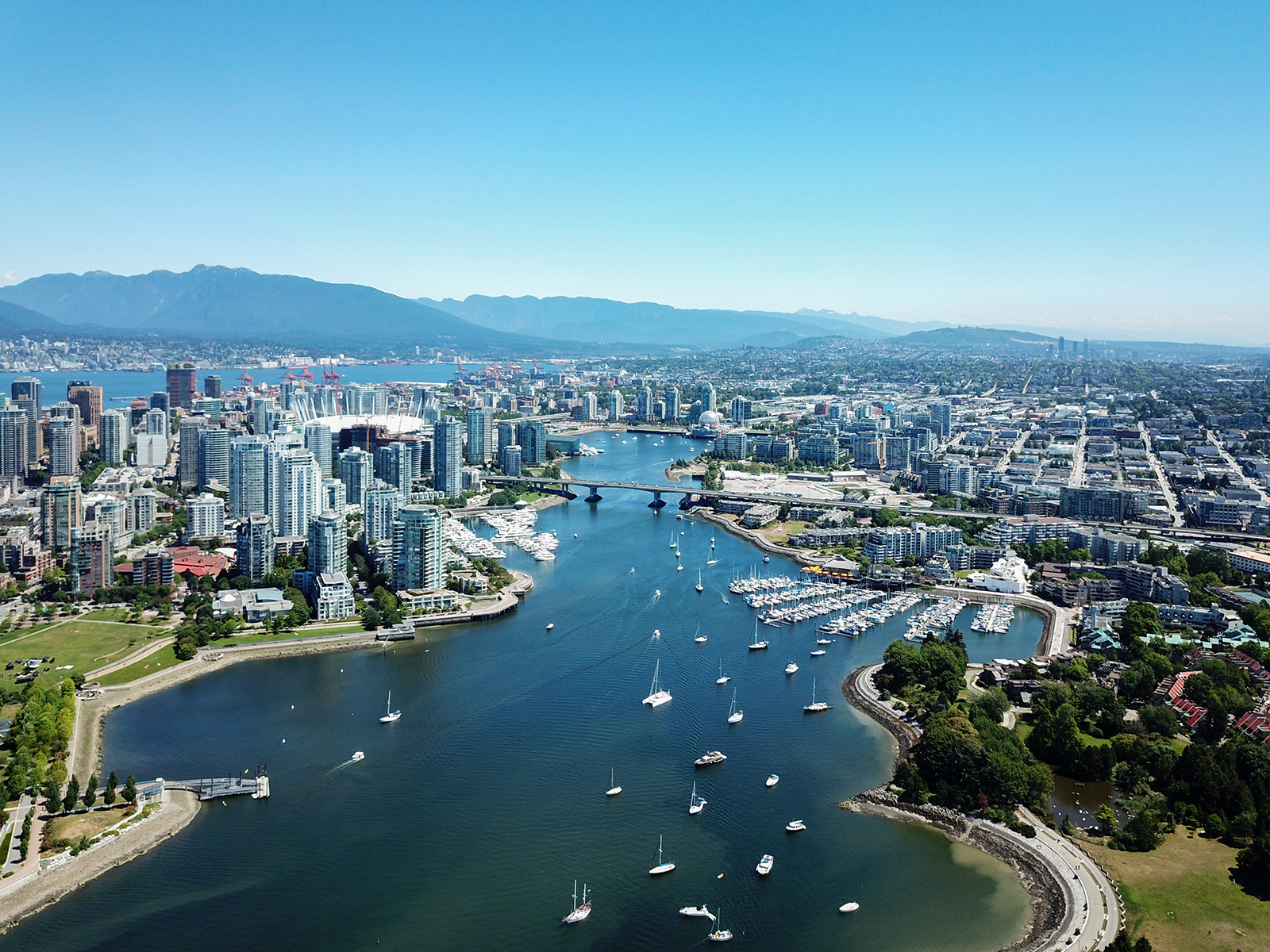
- False Creek from the air

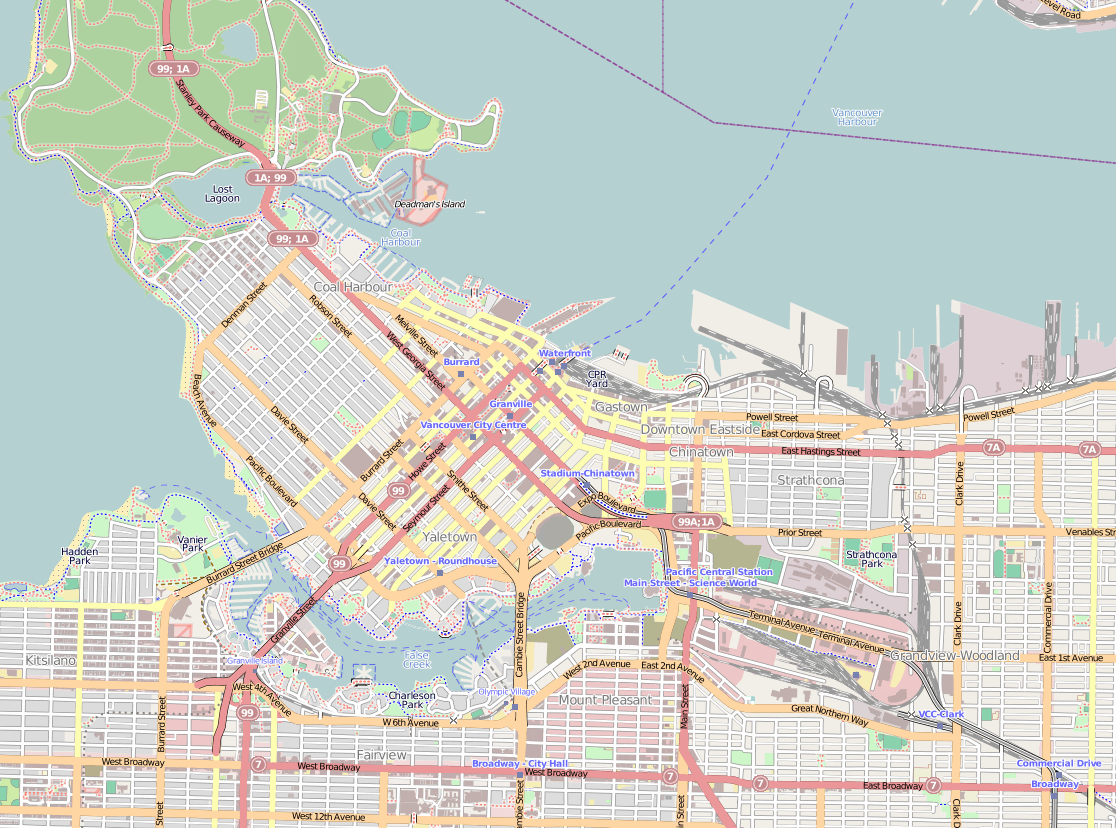
- Location within Downtown Vancouver Location within British Columbia
- Location: Vancouver, British Columbia, Canada
- Coordinates: 49°16′12″N 123°07′44″W
- Type: Inlet
- Etymology: Named by George Henry Richards
- Part of: English Bay
- Islands: Granville Island

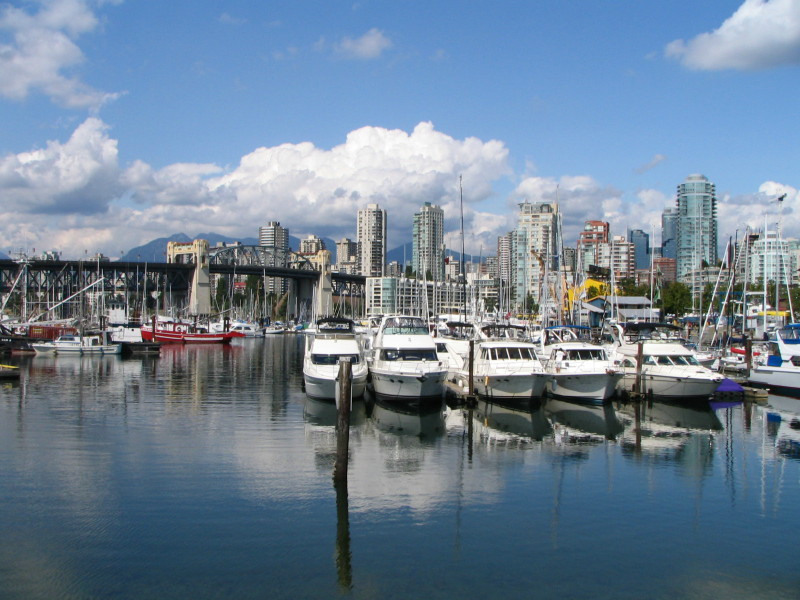
False Creek between Granville Street Bridge and Burrard Street Bridge

False Creek (French: Faux ruisseau) is a short narrow inlet in the heart of Vancouver, British Columbia, Canada, which separates the Downtown and West End neighbourhoods from the rest of the city. It is one of the four main bodies of water bordering Vancouver, along with English Bay (of which it is an inland extension), Burrard Inlet, and the Fraser River. Granville Island is located within the inlet.

Sir George Henry Richards named False Creek during his hydrographic survey of 1856–1863. While travelling along the south side of the Burrard Inlet, Richards thought he was traversing a creek; upon discovering his error, he gave the inlet its current name.

The inlet opens into the English Bay to its northwest, and is surrounded by the Downtown and West End neighbourhoods in the north, Strathcona in the east, and Mount Pleasant, Fairview and Kitsilano in the south. Science World is located at its easternmost end, along with BC Place Stadium and the Georgia Viaduct. Proceeding east to west, it is crossed by the Cambie, Granville, and Burrard bridges. The Canada Line rapid transit tunnel crosses underneath False Creek just west of the Cambie Bridge. In 1986, it was the location of the Expo 86 World's Fair.

False Creek South is a neighbourhood that runs along south shore roughly between the Granville and Cambie bridges. Further east, Southeast False Creek (Olympic Village) runs roughly from Cambie Street to Main Street.

== History ==
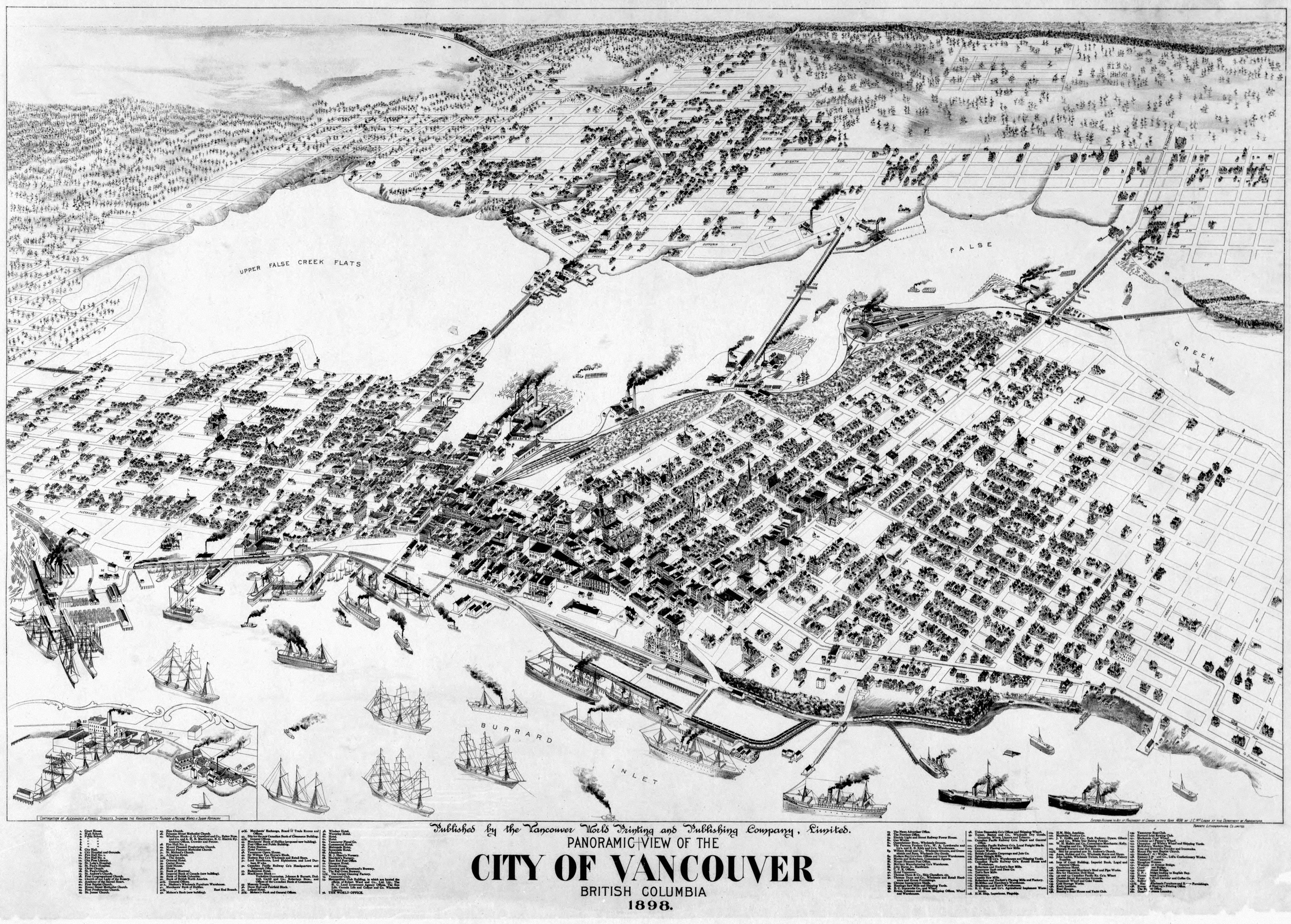
Birds-eye view of Vancouver in 1898. Top left area marked with "Upper False Creek Flats" was the eastern part of False Creek before land reclamation.

=== Pre-colonial ===
Human settlement in the Lower Fraser region began between 8000 and 10 000 years ago, following the retreat of the Sumas Glacier at the end of the last ice age. The settlement by peoples now known as the Coast Salish predates the arrival of salmon in the river 4500–5000 years ago, an occurrence that took place symbiotically with the emergence of Douglas fir, western hemlock, and western red cedar ecosystems between 4000 and 5000 years before the present day. According to Squamish-Sto:lo author and historian Lee Maracle, Vancouver was inhabited by "Downriver Halkomelem" speaking peoples, the Tsleil-Waututh.

First contact between Europeans and the indigenous peoples of present-day Vancouver occurred in June 1792. By 1812, Halkomelem peoples had survived three large epidemics from foreign illnesses such as smallpox, introduced through trading routes, including a 1782 outbreak that killed two-thirds of the population. It has been estimated that shortly before the time of first contact and these epidemics, the indigenous population of the Lower Fraser was over 100,000.

=== Early colonial period ===
An 1830 Hudson's Bay Company census documented 8954 indigenous inhabitants in the region, although the census probably omitted some settlements. As a result of epidemics, the population of the Tsleil-Waututh was reduced to 41 individuals by 1812, who invited the neighbouring Squamish to reside in Burrard Inlet.

Shortly after that, a group of Squamish led by Khatsahlano, a leader from Lil'wat (near present-day Pemberton), occupied present-day False Creek. At this time, there were large sandbars at its entrance. False Creek, which lies in Musqueam territory, was a shared waterway; in addition to the Squamish, the Tsleil-Waututh inhabited False Creek as well, occupying it year-round.

Before European settlement, False Creek extended as far east as what is now Clark Drive. With land reclamation extending into Burrard Inlet and False Creek for port and industrial uses, the landscape began to change dramatically. Once a vital source for Tsleil-Waututh, Musqueam, and Squamish food supplies such as sea asparagus, berries, camas, oysters, clams, wild cabbage, and mushrooms, False Creek became polluted with sewage and toxic effluent from sawmills and other industries. As a result, one nickname for False Creek was "Shit Creek".

From 1894 to 1905 Alfred Wallace built ships on the north shore of False Creek next to Granville Street Bridge.

In 1913, the Squamish residents of the Kitsilano Reserve, on the False Creek sandbar, were forced to relocate. According to Maracle, the settlement was burned down following the forced evacuation. In 1916, the sandbar on which this settlement was located was built into Granville Island to create new industrial land. In 1917, the eastern basin of False Creek was infilled to create land for the Canadian Northern Railway's Pacific Central Station. Talk of draining and filling the inlet to Granville Street continued into the 1950s, but that never occurred.

=== Industrial period ===
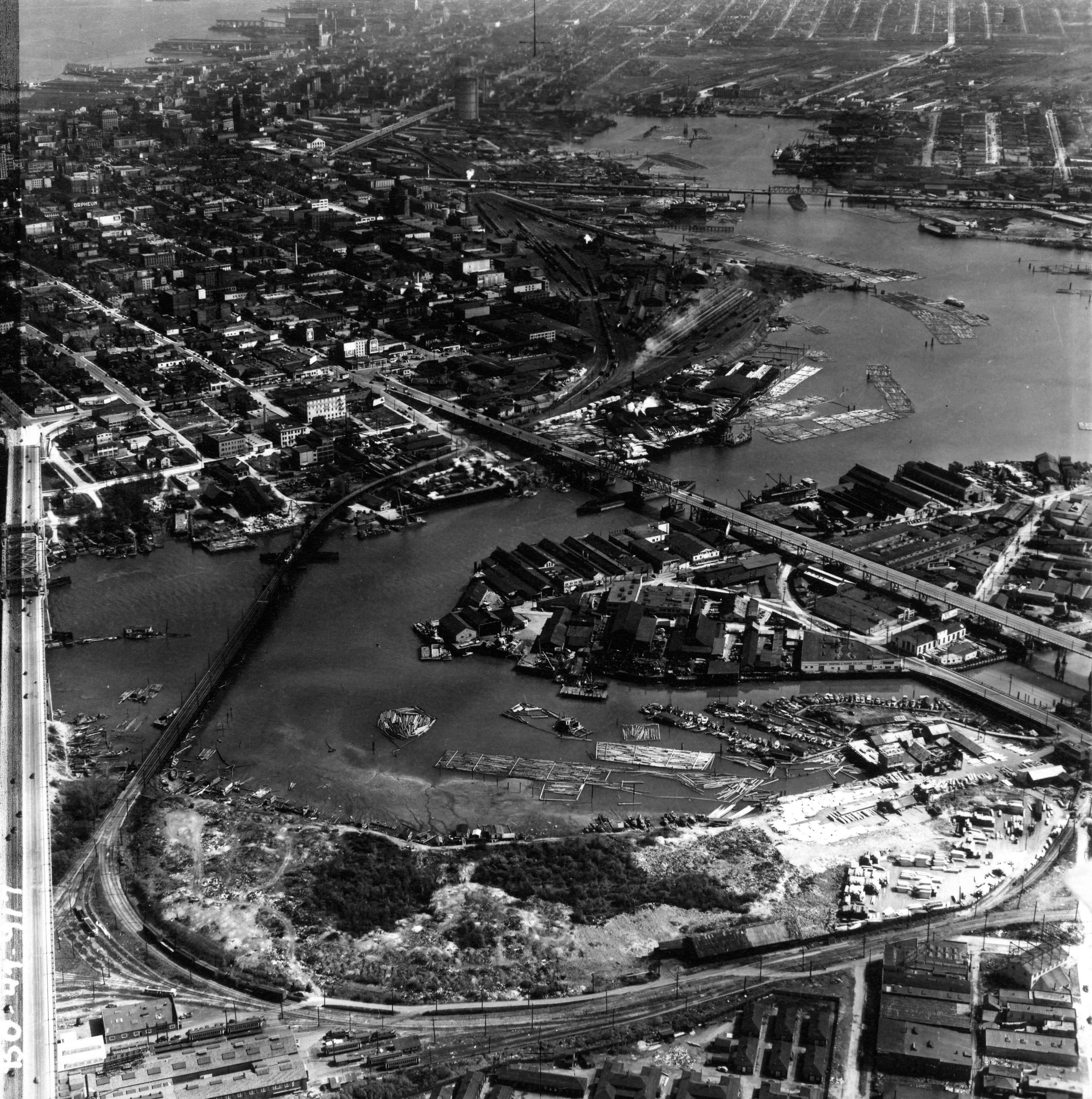
Aerial view, 1947. Granville Island at centre-right.

The False Creek area was the industrial heartland of Vancouver through to the 1950s, and was home to many sawmills and small port operations. As industry shifted to other areas, the vicinity around False Creek started to deteriorate. In 1960, BC Forest Products plant and lumber storage facility on the south side of False Creek caught fire in Vancouver's first-ever five-alarm blaze. Every piece of firefighting equipment and all of Vancouver's firefighters fought the blaze for hours, but the facility was totally destroyed.

Walter Hardwick, a geography professor at UBC, first elected to City Council in 1968, led the City's redevelopment team and helped secure the participation of the Federal Government, which owned Granville Island. A major public involvement and co-design process followed which established public priorities for an accessible waterfront seawall; mixed-tenure housing including market condominiums, co-op and low-income housing and live-aboard marinas; and a vibrant waterfront market. These plans were formalized in a 1972 Official Development Plan. The form and mix of development were revolutionary for Vancouver at the time. A third of the site was set aside for 40 units/acre housing with the balance converted to park, waterfront and community uses.

=== Expo 86 and after ===
The North Shore of False Creek (NFC) was further transformed in the 1980s, as it took centre stage during Expo 86. Following Expo, the Province sold the NFC site to Hong Kong tycoon Li Ka-shing whose company Concord Pacific successfully marketed Vancouver in Asia, as a place for investment and migration. With the province enabling strata titles, a high-rise condominium boom soon followed, with Downtown Vancouver's population soaring from around 6,000 throughout the 1970s and 1980s to over 43,000 in 2006.

The 1991 Official Development Plan enabled significant new density commensurate with the provision of significant public amenities including street front shops and services, parks, school sites, community centres, daycares, co-op and low-income housing. Since then, most of the north shore has become a new neighbourhood of dense housing (about 100 units/acre), adding some 50 000 new residents to Vancouver's downtown peninsula.

On December 1, 1998, Vancouver City Council adopted a set of Blue ways policies and guidelines stating the vision of a waterfront city where land and water combine to meet the environmental, cultural and economic needs of the City and its people in a sustainable, equitable, high quality manner.

Southeast False Creek (SEFC) is the neighbourhood designated by Cambie, Main, West 2nd Avenue, and False Creek. The 2010 Olympic Village, for athlete housing and logistics of the Winter Olympics, is found in Southeast False Creek. As of 2021, the population exceeded 3,000.

== Sports and recreation ==
False Creek is a very popular boating area for many different activities including rowing, dragon boating, canoeing, kayaking, public ferries, charter ships, and visiting pleasure boats. It has 10 marinas with berths for 1500 watercraft and several paddling clubs or boat rental facilities. Since 1986, the creek has been the venue for the Canadian International Dragon Boat Festival and other paddling events.

== Transportation ==
Aquabus and False Creek Ferries are two ferry companies that operate scheduled services daily to and from multiple points along False Creek. In addition to three bridges and multiple bus routes, False Creek can also be crossed via the Canada Line in a tunnel between Olympic Village station on the South shore and Yaletown-Roundhouse station to the North.

== Environmental issues ==
There are regular reports of pollution problems in False Creek, and there are occasional warnings that the water is not safe for swimming, particular at the eastern end which is least affected by tidal inflow and outflow.

Because of connections between Vancouver's storm-sewer and sanitary-sewer systems, heavy rains may cause raw sewage to discharge directly into False Creek.

=== Impact on wildlife ===
Several decades following the suspension of industrial activity in the area, a number of shore and seabirds such as cormorants, ducks, herons, kingfishers, owls, geese, crows, and gulls have returned, as well as harbour seals. In an unusual sighting, in May 2010 a grey whale entered False Creek and traversed its length before returning to the open waters of the Strait of Georgia.

Factors working against the further return of wildlife include residual industrial contaminants, spillage from the sewer overflow system into the creek, and the seawall that constrains much of the shoreline with little habitat value. The city has attempted to recreate the natural shoreline in some areas and is working to phase out the antiquated sewer overflow system.

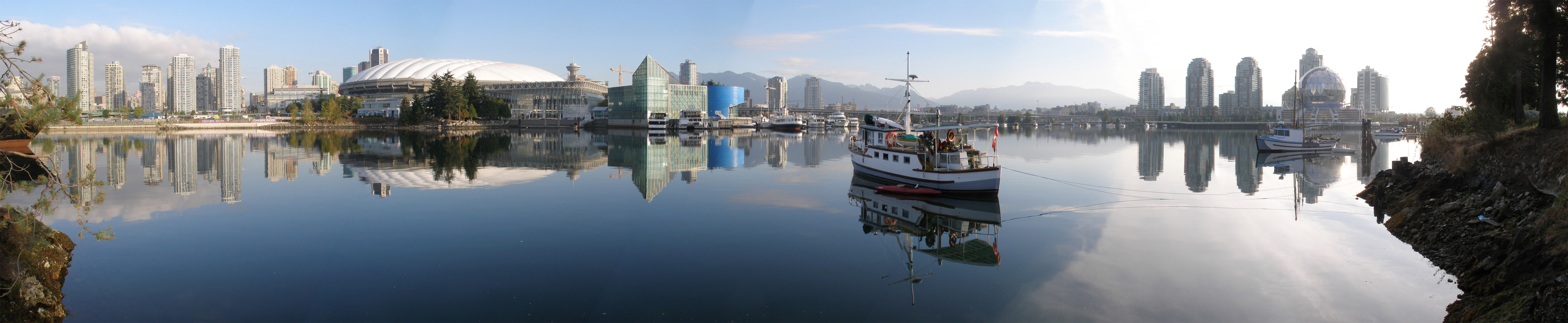
Panorama of False Creek, left to right: Downtown Vancouver, BC Place, Plaza of Nations (since demolished), and Science World

== Architecture and urban planning ==
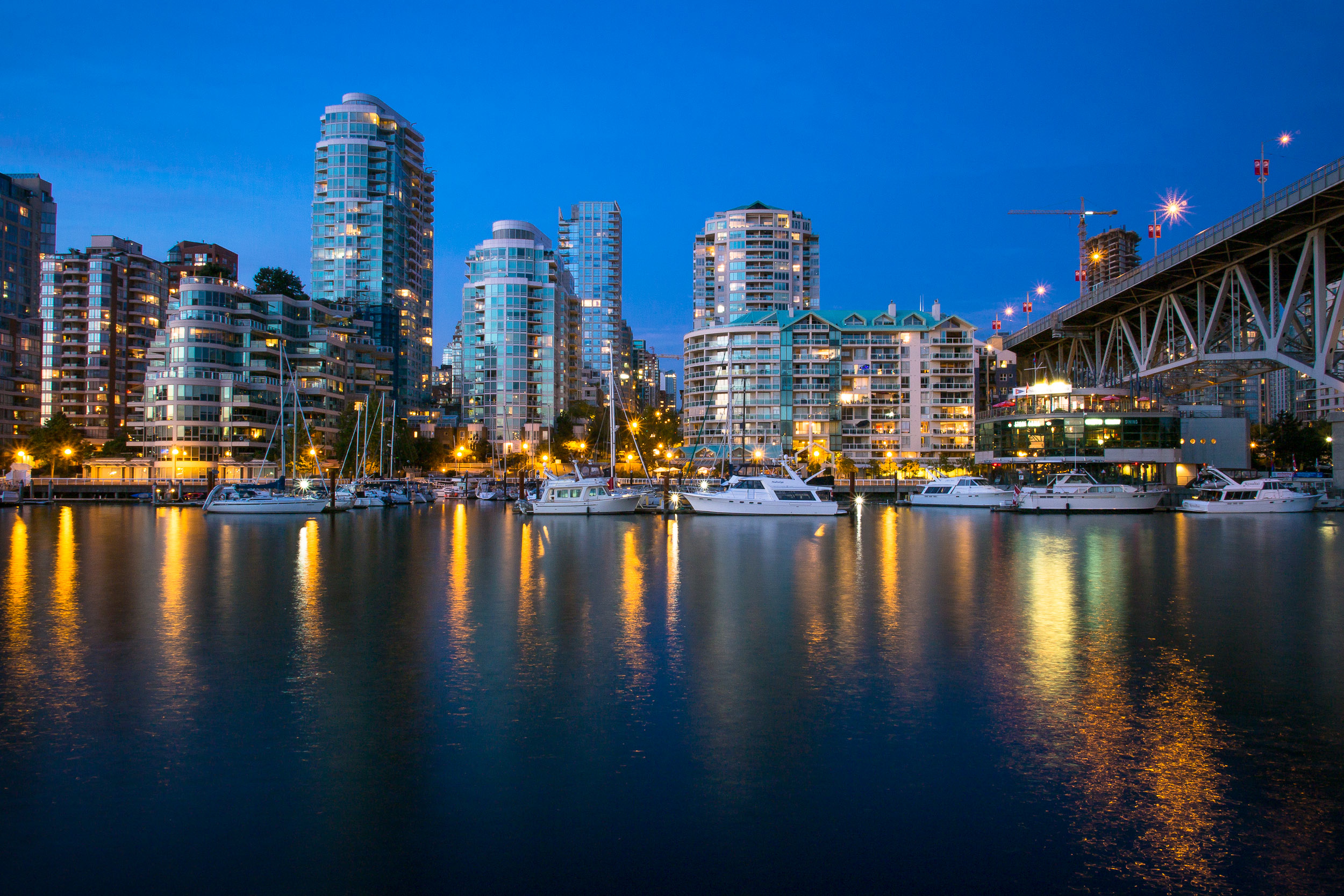
False Creek at blue hour

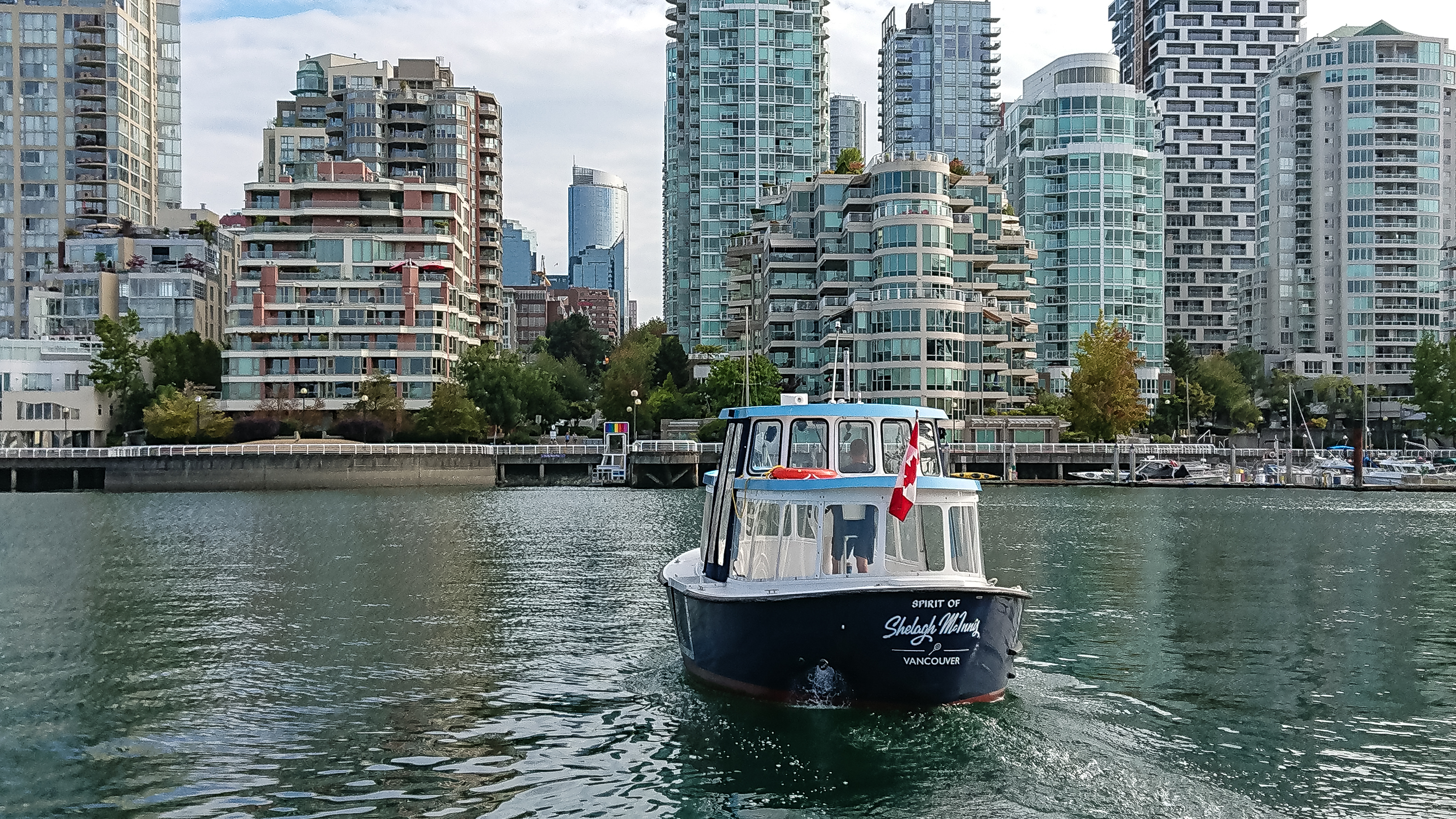
Water taxi on False Creek

=== False Creek South ===
The south shore of False Creek has had quite a diverse history of land uses since its founding. South False Creek went from being an industrial park, in the late 1800s and mid-1900s, to being the populous residential area that it is today. The development of this area, beginning anew in the 1970s, occurred at a critical time in Vancouver's history when citizens were organising support for a new picture of the city, one that broke away from the standardized utilitarian cities that were so popular in North America and, instead, pushed for a more liveable and diverse built environment.

The result is a medium-density area with a variety of architectural designs, ownership opportunities, recreational activities, and modes of transportation, which allows for easier mobility within the community and a more picturesque landscape.

False Creek south is home to False Creek Elementary School.

False Creek consists of 70% social housing and 30% leasehold apartments and condos.

- 30% low income below market (subsidised) rent. Including Metro Vancouver Housing, Portland Hotel Society, other organisation and societies.
- 30% co-op housing rent geared to income but still quite subsidised (below market)
- 10% housing for people with special needs (below market rents)
- 30% standard market rent apartments and leasehold condos.

All of False Creek South is on Leasehold land which is owned by the City of Vancouver.

Southeast False Creek (Olympic Village) consists mostly of market-rate apartments and modern condos with a few co-ops and social housing.

=== North False Creek ===
The north shore of False Creek, on the downtown peninsula, has undergone multiple stages of development since its purchase by the province from the Canadian Pacific Railway in the early 1980s. Before the BC Cabinet bought the land of North False Creek to begin development for Expo '86, the land was used for industrial purposes. Provincial leaders developed a plan to build a sports stadium (BC Place), commercial outlets, and high-density residences on the newly cleared land.

False Creek North is home to Crosstown Elementary School as well as Elsie Roy Elementary School.

== Parks ==
- Charleson Park
- Hinge Park

== See also ==
- Bodies of water in Vancouver
- Charleson Park
- False Creek Friends Society
- Hinge Park
