= Vancouver Cross Country =

Coordinates: 49.3026°N 123.1305°W

- Date: Sunday of Remembrance Day weekend in November
- Location: Vancouver, British Columbia, Canada
- Event type: Cross Country Race
- Distance: 8 kilometers / 4kilometers
- Established: 2013
- Website: Vancouver Cross Country

Vancouver Cross Country is an annual citywide cross country running event held in Vancouver, BC, Canada. It usually takes place during autumn and winter to challenge weather conditions of rain, sleet, and a wide range of temperatures.

== Race course ==
The 2013 race starts and finishes at Lumbermen's Arch in Stanley Park. The courses consist rolling terrain, forest trials, bridges, uphills and downhills. The current route begins at Lumbermen's Arch, passes Lost Lagoon, and then goes through the forest trials in Stanley Park.

=== Distances ===
Runners have two choices, 8 kilometers and 4 kilometers.

=== Race Day ===
All participants start off using a staggered time system to ensure timing accuracy. Along the race course, various safety volunteers are on course to direct the runners. Volunteers help in areas such as water stations, medical stations, set-up/take down, food services, given out shirts & medals to runners.

== Race dates ==
- November 10, 2013
