= Charleson Park =

Park in Vancouver, British Columbia, Canada

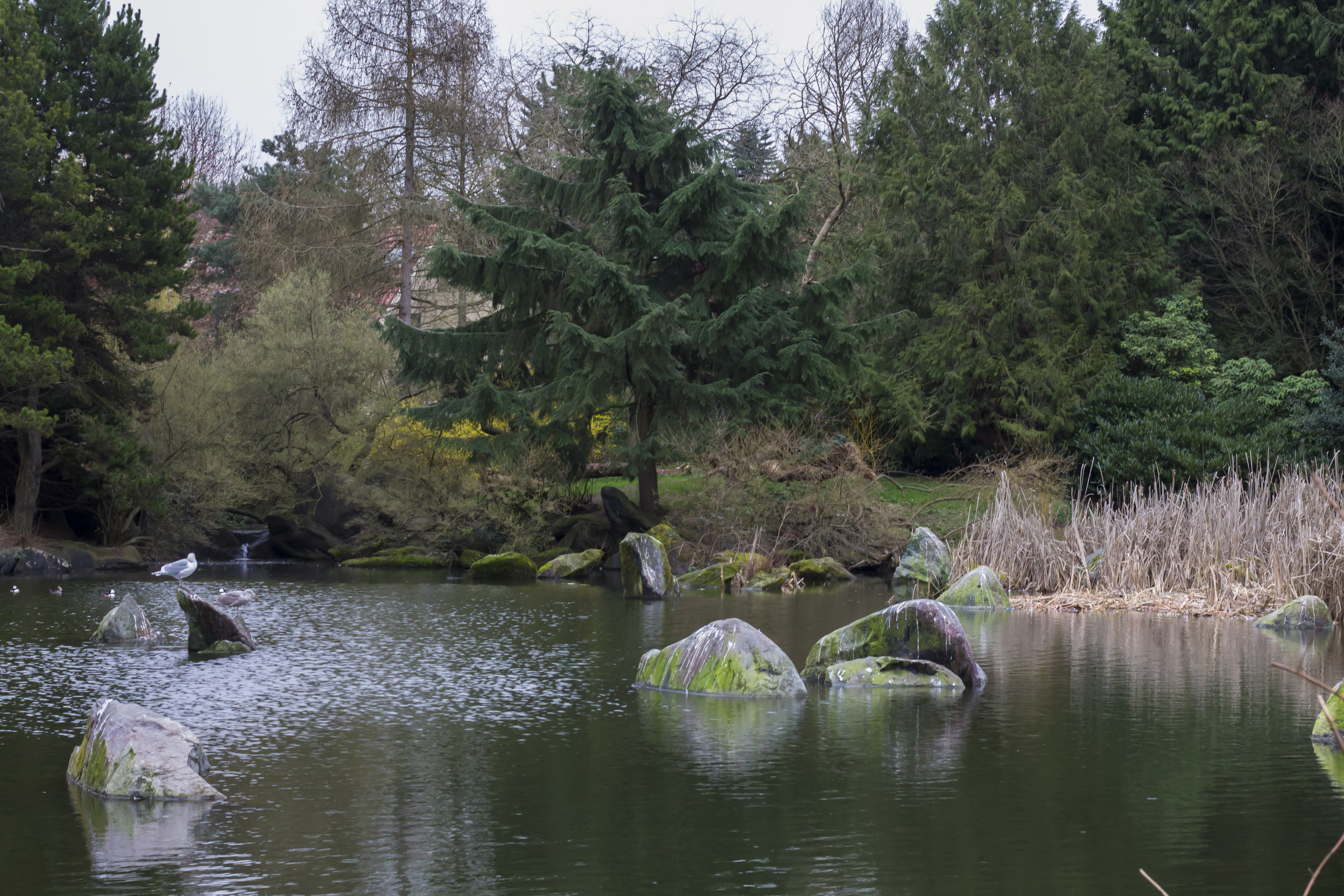
- The park's lagoon, 2016

- Location within Greater Vancouver Regional District
- Interactive map of Charleson Park
- Type: Park
- Location: Fairview, Vancouver, British Columbia
- Coordinates: 49°16′01″N 123°07′32″W
- Area: 7.14 ha

Charleson Park is a 7.14-hectare park along False Creek, located in the Fairview neighborhood of Vancouver, British Columbia, Canada.

== Description ==
The park has skyline views of the city, and a large off-leash dog area. It also has a playground that is shared with the False Creek Elementary School built in 2020. The playground features a wooden pirate ship play structure, an embankment slide, and two in-ground trampolines, among other structures.
