= Olympic Village station =

Metro Vancouver SkyTrain station

Olympic Village
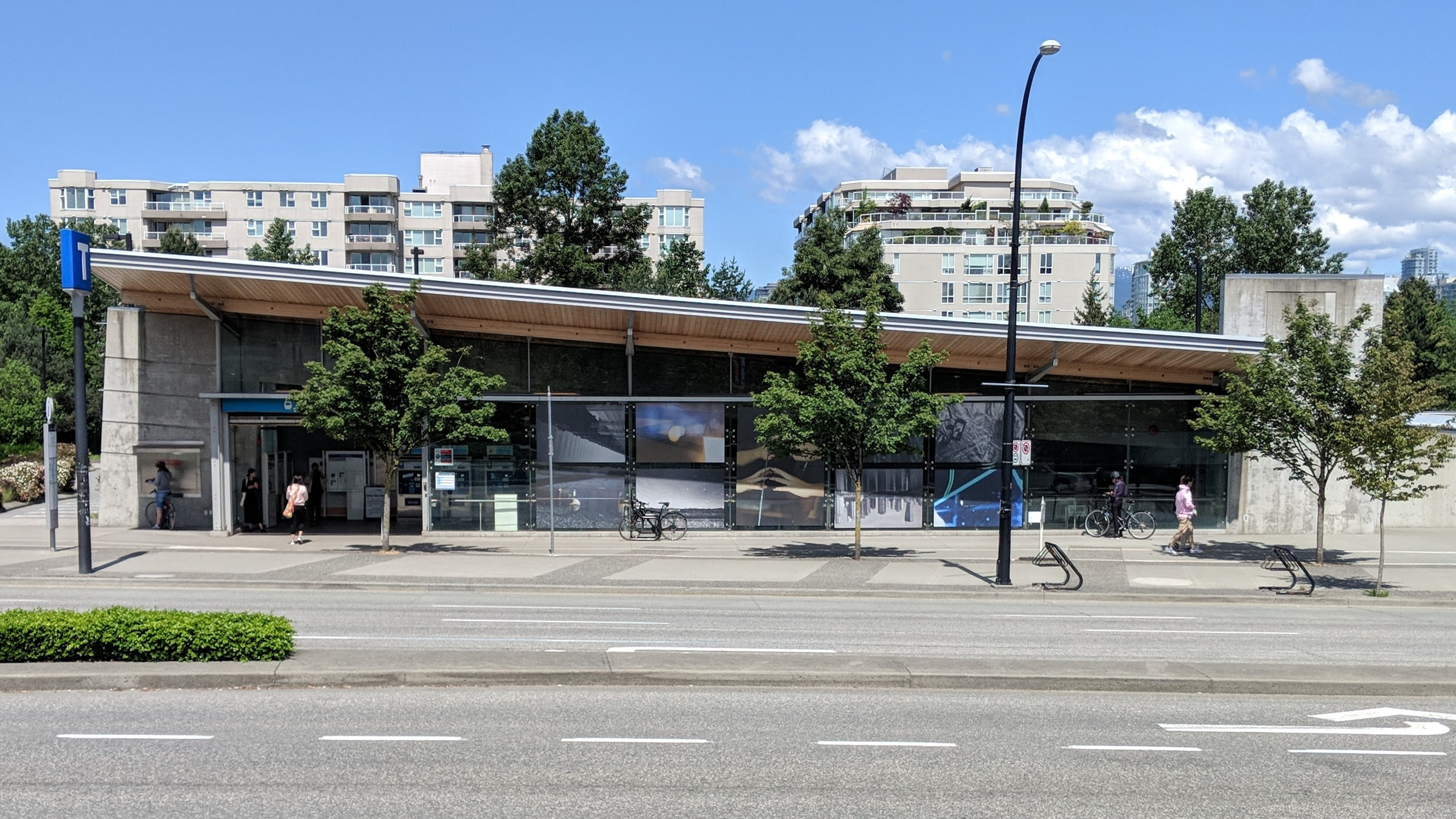

General information
- Location: 525 West 2nd Avenue, Vancouver
- Coordinates: 49°15′59″N 123°6′57″W
- System: SkyTrain station
- Owner: TransLink
- Platforms: Centre platform
- Tracks: 2

Construction
- Structure type: Subway
- Accessible: yes
- Architect: VIA Architecture

Other information
- Station code: OV
- Fare zone: 1

History
- Opened: August 17, 2009

Passengers
- 2025: 1,328,000 ▲2.9%
- Rank: 38 of 54

Services
Preceding station	TransLink	Following station
Yaletown–Roundhouse towards Waterfront	Canada Line	Broadway–City Hall towards Richmond–Brighouse or YVR–Airport
Location

Olympic Village is an underground station on the Canada Line of Metro Vancouver's SkyTrain rapid transit system. The station is located at the intersection of Cambie Street and West 2nd Avenue, adjacent to the Cambie Street Bridge in Vancouver, British Columbia, Canada.

The station is located in the Fairview neighbourhood and serves the South False Creek residential and commercial areas, which included the Olympic Village built for the 2010 Winter Olympics. The use of the term "Olympic" was licensed for use from the International Olympic Committee.

== History ==
During the planning and approval process for the Canada Line, Olympic Village station was initially intended for completion along with the rest of the line. When the cost of the project had to be scaled back by TransLink (circa 2005), the station was deferred until after the opening of the Canada Line; however, the City of Vancouver owned the station site and decided to fund the station's construction to spur redevelopment of its lands and the nearby Southeast False Creek neighbourhood, and the station's construction was restored to the initial phase.

The station opened in 2009 and was designed by the architecture firm VIA Architecture. "Olympic Village" is the third name for this station: its original proposed names were "2nd Avenue" and later "False Creek South".

== Services ==
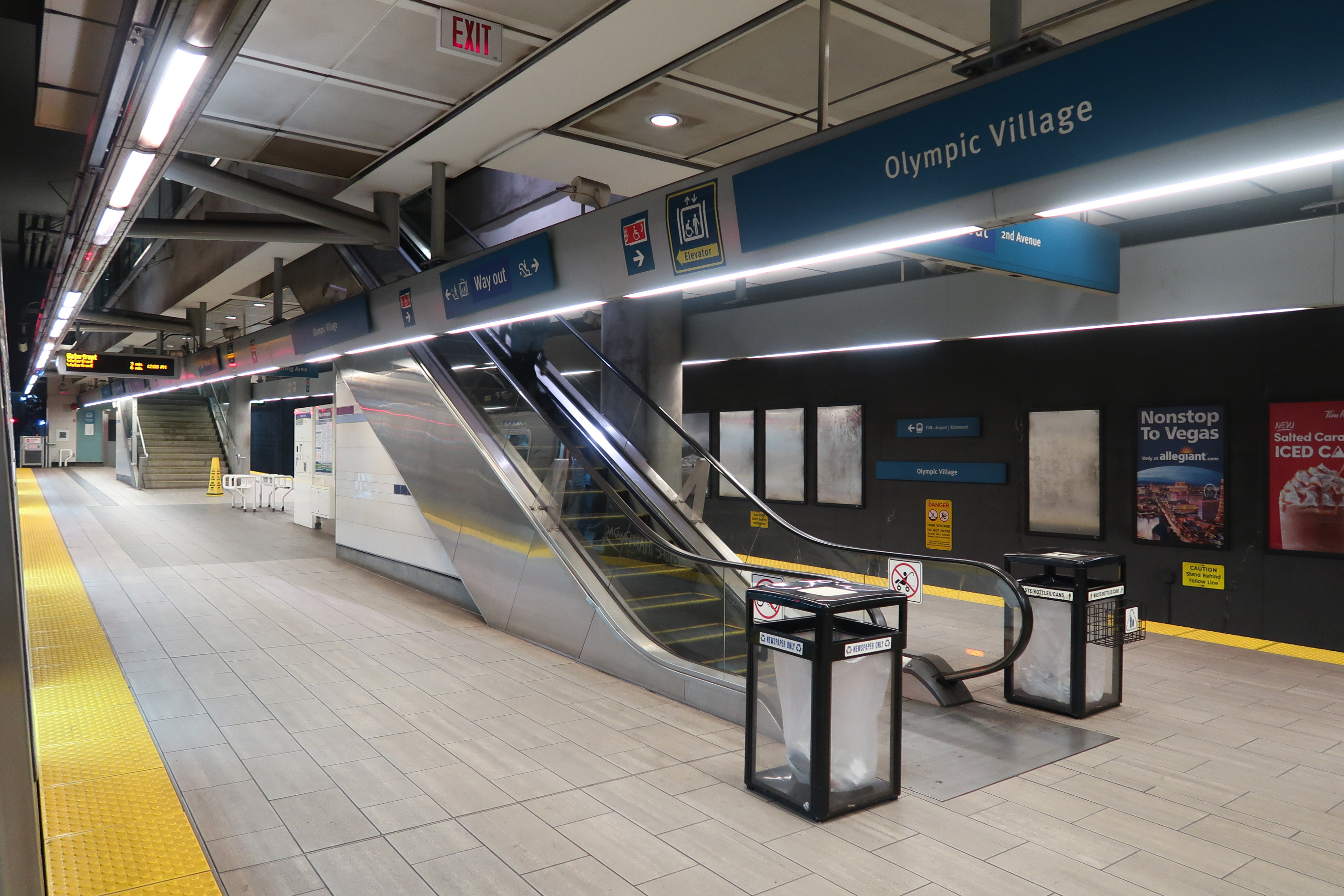
Olympic Village station platform in 2018

Olympic Village is within a short walk of the False Creek Ferries and Aquabus ferry stop at Spyglass and Stamp's Landing. Both companies provide service to Granville Island, David Lam Park, Yaletown, Plaza of Nations and Science World, while False Creek Ferries provides service to Kitsilano and the West End.

The station was within walking distance of Leg-In-Boot station on the Vancouver Downtown Historic Railway, a tram service that operated on weekends from 1998 to 2011, connecting Science World and Main Street–Science World station to Granville Island. The Downtown Historic Railway ceased operations in 2011 due to financial constraints.

During the 2010 Winter Olympics, the Olympic Line, a temporary streetcar demonstration service, operated on the Downtown Historic Railway between Olympic Village station and Granville Island.

== Station information ==
=== Entrances ===
Olympic Village is served by a single entrance located on 2nd Avenue at the southwest end of the Cambie Street Bridge.

=== Transit connections ===
The following bus routes can be found in close proximity to Olympic Village station:

Bay	Location	Routes
1	2nd Avenue; Westbound	50 Waterfront Station; 84 UBC
2	2nd Avenue; Eastbound	84 VCC–Clark Station
3	2nd Avenue; Eastbound	15 Cambie

== Public art ==
Outside the station is a sculpture by Marie Khouri, Le Banc or The Bench, intended to double as a bench for people to sit in. Soon after the Canada Line opened, the sculpture was disfigured by skateboarders performing grinds on it. The work was repaired by Khouri at her own expense.

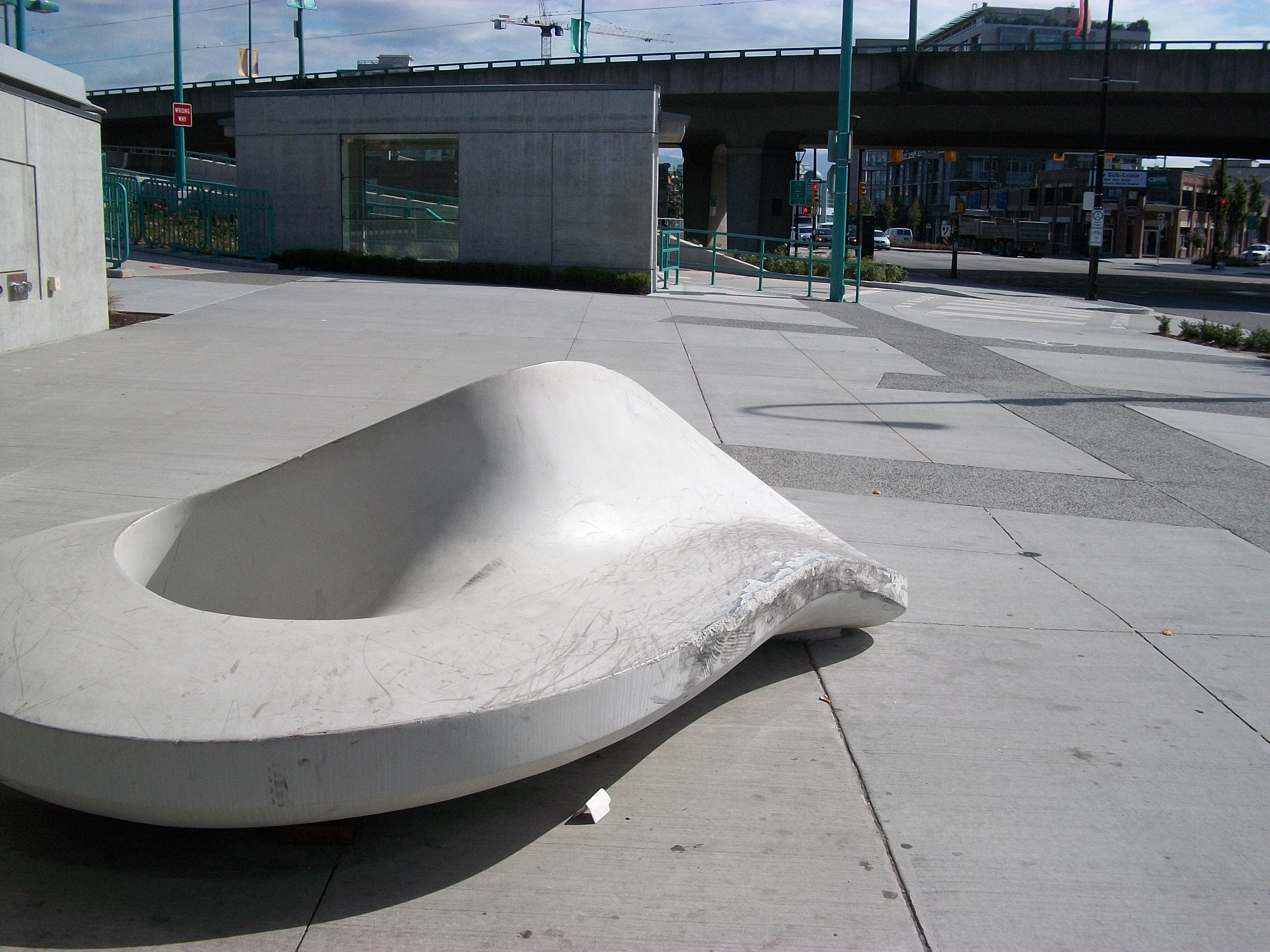
Le Banc sculpture scarred by skateboards
