= Yaletown–Roundhouse station =

Metro Vancouver SkyTrain station

Yaletown–Roundhouse
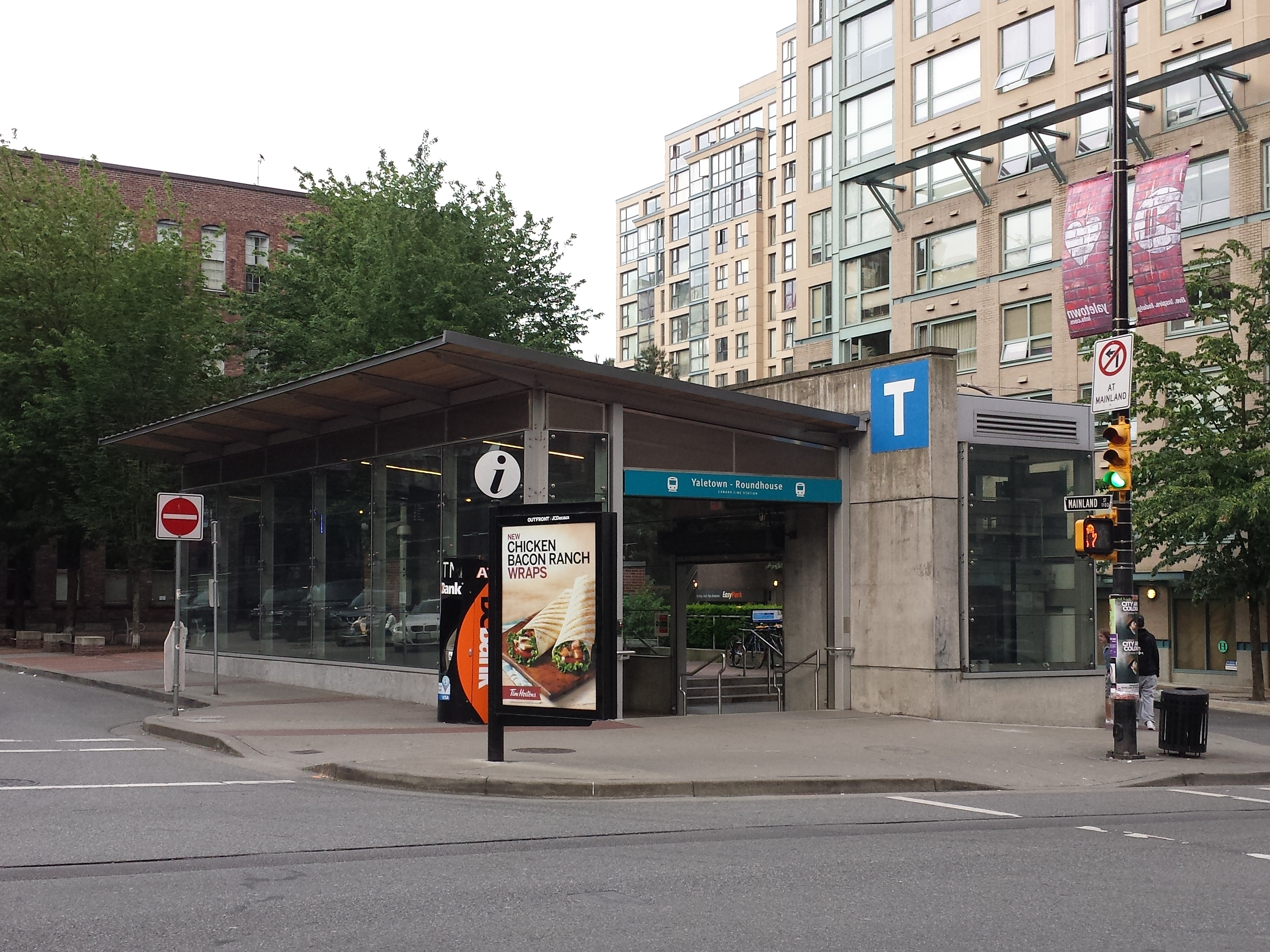
- Yaletown–Roundhouse station entrance in 2016

General information
- Location: 297 Davie Street, Vancouver
- Coordinates: 49.27455°N 123.12190°W
- System: SkyTrain station
- Owner: TransLink
- Platforms: Centre platform
- Tracks: 2

Construction
- Structure type: Subway
- Depth: 17 metres (56 ft)
- Accessible: yes
- Architect: VIA Architecture

Other information
- Station code: YT
- Fare zone: 1

History
- Opened: August 17, 2009

Passengers
- 2025: 3,024,000 ▼1%
- Rank: 21 of 54

Services
Preceding station	TransLink	Following station
Vancouver City Centre towards Waterfront	Canada Line	Olympic Village towards Richmond–Brighouse or YVR–Airport
Location

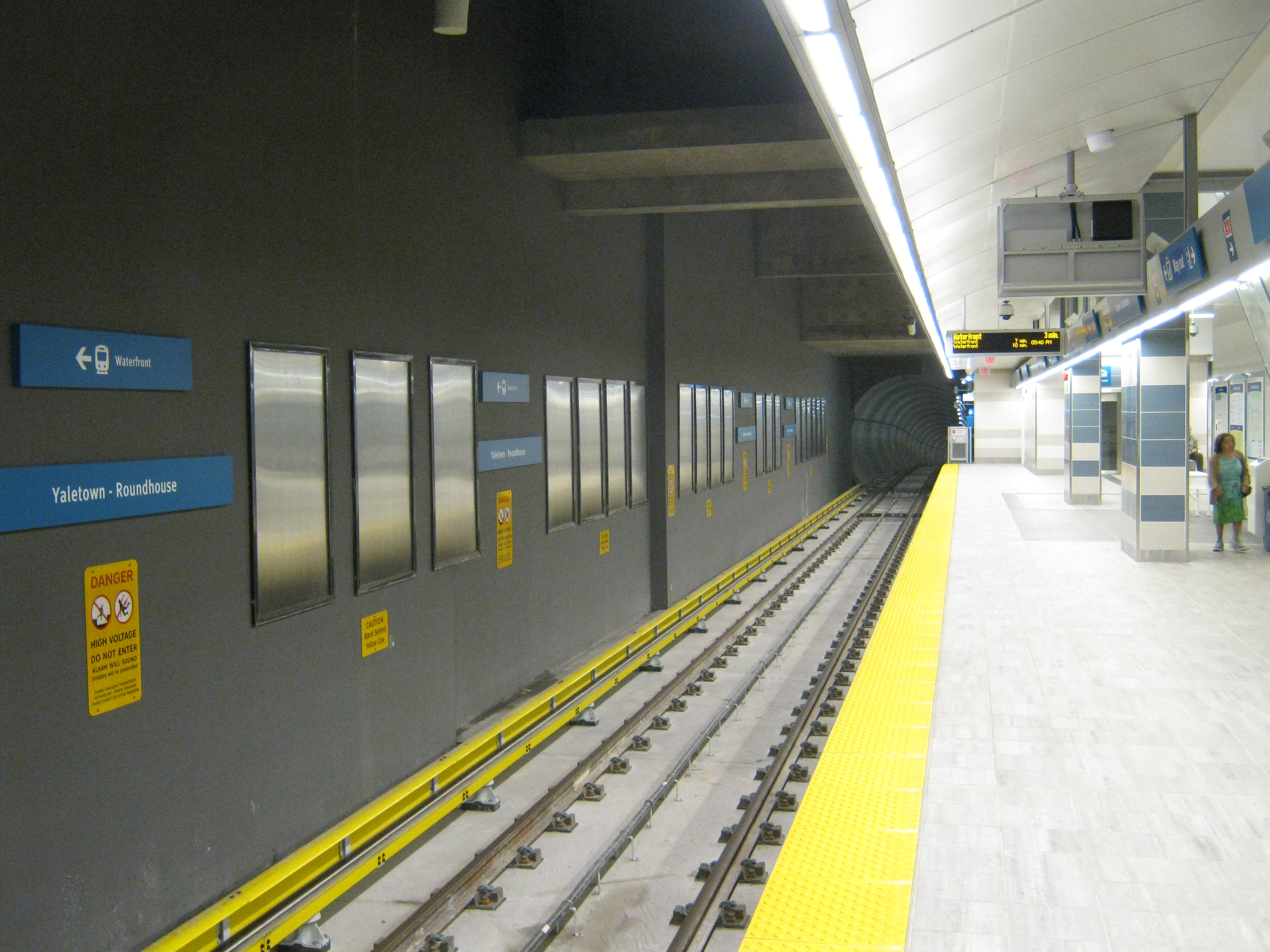
Platform with service to Waterfront

Yaletown–Roundhouse is an underground station on the Canada Line of Metro Vancouver's SkyTrain rapid transit system. The station is located on Davie Street at Mainland Street, approximately 80 metres (260 ft) northwest of Pacific Boulevard, and serves the residential and retail areas of Yaletown and Downtown Vancouver in Vancouver, British Columbia, Canada.

== History ==
Yaletown–Roundhouse station opened in 2009, and its name is derived from the neighbourhood in which it is located, as well as a historic railway roundhouse which now serves as a community centre. VIA Architecture was the architecture firm responsible for designing the station.

In 2018, TransLink announced that Yaletown–Roundhouse station, as well as two other Canada Line stations located in downtown Vancouver, would receive an accessibility upgrade which includes additional escalators. Construction began on January 28, 2019, and was completed by July.

== Station information ==
=== Entrances ===
Yaletown–Roundhouse station is served by a single entrance located at the northeast corner of the intersection at Davie Street and Mainland Street.

=== Transit connections ===
The following bus routes can be found in close proximity to Yaletown–Roundhouse station:

Bay	Location	Routes
1	Davie Street; Westbound	6 Davie
2	Davie Street; Eastbound	6 Downtown
3	Pacific Boulevard; Westbound	23 Beach
4	Pacific Boulevard; Eastbound	23 Main Street Station
