= Vancouver Writers Fest =

Canadian non-profit literary organization

- Vancouver Writers Fest Logo
- Formation: 1988
- Founder: Alma Lee
- Type: Non-profit organization
- Headquarters: 202 – 1398 Cartwright Street, Vancouver British Columbia
- Board of directors: Co-chair: Daniel Getz Co-chair: Jillian Stirk; Treasurer: Benita Loughlin; Secretary: Pat Cumming Directors at large: Deepthi Atukorala, Sanika Bhurke, Avalon Bourne, Alison Broddle, Julie Iannacone, Anna Panzo, Steve Tornes, Sonia Wong
- Key people: Artistic Director: Leslie Hurtig; Managine Director: Jennifer Milley
- Website: https://www.writersfest.bc.ca/

The Vancouver Writers Fest is a non-profit organization that produces a variety of literary events in Vancouver, British Columbia, Canada. Its main event is the Vancouver Writers Fest, which is an annual week-long literary festival held on Granville Island, Vancouver in the third week of October. Writers from Canada and abroad attend the festival to perform readings, interviews and panel discussions. The organization also runs the Books & Ideas literary and social series on Granville Island, Incite reading series with VPL, and the Writers in the Classroom program year-round.

The Festival was introduced in 1988 by founding Artistic Director Alma Lee. In 2010, the Festival was named the "Best Large Literary Festival in Canada" by the Canadian Tourism Commission. The Vancouver Writers Fest adopted its current name in 2012.

Past authors have included Martin Amis, Margaret Atwood, Maeve Binchy, Peter Carey, Roddy Doyle, Timothy Findley, John Irving, P. D. James, Thomas Keneally, Andrea Levy, Frank McCourt, Rohinton Mistry, David Mitchell, Alice Munro, Michael Ondaatje, J. K. Rowling, Salman Rushdie and Carol Shields.

== Programming ==
The programming of the Vancouver Writers Fest aims to promote literacy on both a local and international level; to support and encourage British Columbia and Canadian writers in their vocation; to showcase a variety of international works of literature; and to educate a wide range of communities and age groups in literacy and the written arts.

The main regular events produced by the Vancouver Writers Fest include: Books & Ideas on Granville Island, the Incite Reading Series, the Vancouver Writers Fest on Granville Island and the Youth Education Programs.

=== Books & Ideas ===
Books & Ideas was launched in January 2025. With a theatre venue on Granville Island and a pop-up bar for socializing, attendees are invited to connect with other members of the local literary community—and meet the authors onstage—in a modern space for exchanging ideas.

=== Incite ===
Incite is a free, public series that runs year-round. Incite is put on in partnership with the Vancouver Public Library and features discussions, panels and interviews with multiple authors. Past authors who have participated include Yann Martel, Bernard Schlink, Joyce Carol Oates and William Gibson. The Incite reading series takes place in Downtown Vancouver at the Alice McKay room of the Vancouver Public Library Central Branch.

=== Vancouver Writers Fest on Granville Island ===
Festival events include interviews, panel discussions, performances and readings as well as a four days event for kindergarten to grade 12 students. Recurring events include Grand Openings, The Literary Cabaret, the Sunday Brunch and the Afternoon Tea.

=== Youth Education Programs ===
The Vancouver Writers Fest’s youth education programs are an integral part of the programming of the organization.

Some of the education events include:

- 36 sessions aimed at children and youth during the October Festival
- Writers in the Classroom: free author visits to schools in Metro Vancouver
- Two Youth Writing Contests

== Literary Prize Winners who have appeared at the Vancouver Writers Fest ==
=== Canadian Awards ===
==== Scotiabank Giller Prize ====
Authors	Year
Will Ferguson Esi Edugyan Johanna Skibsrud Linden MacIntyre Joseph Boyden Elizabeth Hay Vincent Lam David Bergen Alice Munro M.G. Vassanji Austin Clarke Richard B. Wright Michael Ondaatje David Adams Richards Bonne Burnard Mordecai Richler Margaret Atwood Rohinton Mistry	2012 2011 2010 2009 2008 2007 2006 2005 2004, 1998 2003, 1994 2002 2001 2000 2000 1999 1997 1996 1995

==== Governor General's Literary Award for English Fiction ====
Authors	Year
Thomas King Linda Spalding Patrick De Witt Dianne Warren Kate Pullinger Nino Ricci Michael Ondaatje Peter Behrens David Gilmour Miriam Toews Richard B. Wright Matt Cohen Jane Urquhart Guy Vanderhaeghe Greg Hollingshead Rudy Wiebe Carol Shields Rohinton Mistry Paul Quarrington David Adams Richards M.T. Kelly Alice Munro Margaret Atwood Josef Skvorecky Leon Rooke Mavis Gallant George Bowering Jack Hodgins Timothy Findley	2014 2012 2011 2010 2009 2008,1990 2007, 2000, 1992 2006 2005 2004 2001 1999 1997 1996 1995 1994 1993 1991 1989 1988 1987 1986, 1978 1985 1984 1983 1981 1980, 1969 1979 1977

==== Charles Taylor Prize for Literary Non-Fiction ====
Authors	Year
Thomas King Andrew Westoll Charles Foran Richard Gwyn Rudy Wiebe J.B. MacKinnon Charles Montgomery Isabel Huggan Carol Shields Wayne Johnston	2014 2012 2011 2008 2007 2006 2005 2004 2002 2000

==== Rogers Writers' Trust Fiction Prize ====
Authors	Year
Miriam Toews Patrick deWitt Emma Donoghue Annabel Lyon Lawrence Hill Kenneth J. Harvey Joseph Boyden Alice Munro Kevin Patterson Paulette Jiles Helen Humphreys Greg Hollingshead Austin Clarke	2014, 2008 2011 2010 2009 2007 2006 2005 2004 2003 2002 2000 1998 1997

=== International Awards ===
==== Man Booker Prize ====
Authors	Year
Marlon James 2015 Julian Barnes 2011 Howard Jacobson 2010 Kiran Desai 2006 Alan Hollinghurst 2004 Yann Martel 2002 Peter Carey 2001, 1988 Margaret Atwood 2000 Ian McEwan 1998 Roddy Doyle 1993 Michael Ondaatje 1992 A S Byatt 1990 Thomas Keneally 1982 Salman Rushdie 1981	2015 2011 2010 2006 2004 2002 2001, 1988 2000 1998 1993 1992 1990 1982 1981

==== Pulitzer Prize for Fiction ====
Authors	Year
Paul Harding Elizabeth Strout Junot Díaz Michael Chabon Richard Ford Carol Shields Jane Smiley	2010 2009 2008 2001 1996 1995 1992

==== International IMPAC Dublin Literary Award ====
Authors	Year
Jon McGregor Colum McCann Rawi Hage Colm Toibin Alistair MacLeod Andrew Miller David Malouf	2012 2011 2008 2006 2001 1999 1996

==== Bailey’s Women’s Prize for Fiction (Orange Prize) ====
Authors	Year
Eimear McBride Chimamanda Ngozi Adichie Andrea Levy Kate Grenville Linda Grant Carol Shields Anne Michaels	2014 2007 2004 2001 2000 1998 1997

== Granville Island ==
The Vancouver Writers Fest is based in Granville Island, a venue that adds to the overall experience of the October festival.

Some of the venues of the October Festival in Granville Island include:

- Performance Works
- Granville Island Stage
- Waterfront Theatre
- Improv Centre
- Studio 1398
- Stanley Industrial Alliance Stage

Some of the off site venues include:

- St. Andrew’s-Wesley United Church
- The Vancouver Playhouse
- The Beaumont Studio Artist Society
