= Vancouver Downtown Historic Railway =

Heritage electric railway line in BC, Canada

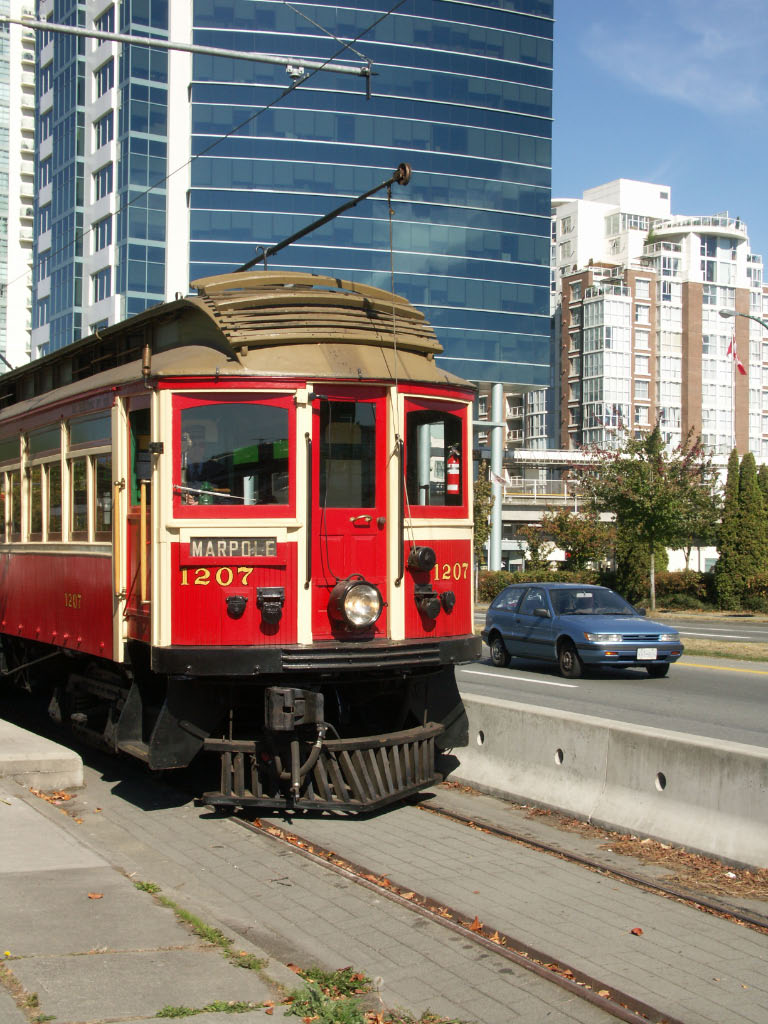
- Streetcar No.1207

Overview
- Status: Indefinitely suspended
- Owner: City of Vancouver
- Locale: Vancouver, British Columbia
- Termini: Science World station; Granville Island station
- Stations: 3

Service
- Type: Heritage streetcar, seasonal
- Services: 1
- Operator: Transit Museum Society

History
- Opened: July 29, 1998
- Closed: October 2011

Technical
- Track gauge: 1,435 mm (4 ft 8 1/2 in)
- Old gauge: 4 ft 8 1/2 in (1,435 mm)
- Electrification: 600 V DC

The Vancouver Downtown Historic Railway was a heritage electric railway line that operated from 1998 to 2011 between Granville Island and Science World (Olympic Village Station after 2009), in Vancouver, British Columbia, Canada. It operated only on weekends and holidays, usually from May to mid-October, and was aimed primarily at tourists. Two restored interurban trams were used on the line, which used a former freight railway right-of-way.

The line was owned by the City of Vancouver. The cars were operated by volunteers from the Transit Museum Society. The car shown (1207) was privately owned. By 2018 both tram cars (1207 and 1231) have been donated and moved to the Fraser Valley Heritage Railway in Cloverdale.

== Heritage service ==
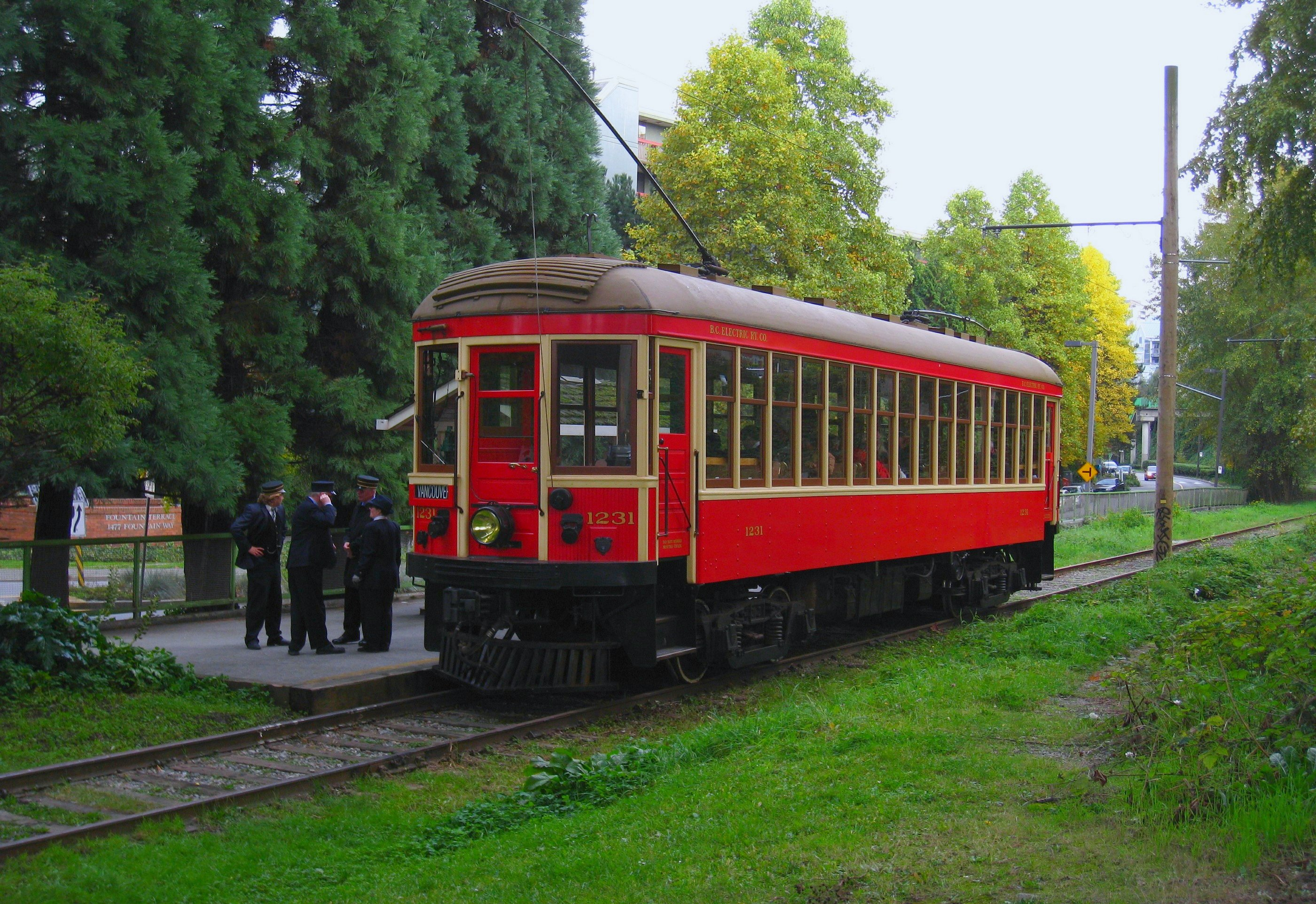
Interurban car No. 1231 at the station on October 19, 2008 as the summer season concludes.

Service was inaugurated on July 29, 1998, and was considered to be a demonstration project for a modern downtown streetcar system that the city plans to develop. It continued to operate nearly every summer through 2011 as an excursion-oriented historic electric railway line. From 2009 to 2010, the heritage service did not operate, with the line from west of Olympic Village used for a modern-streetcar demonstration service known as the "Olympic Line" (see section below). Temporary modifications made to the overhead wire took longer than expected to undo, delaying the start of 2011 service, with the service starting on July 1 and scheduled to run mid-October. The line did not operate in 2012, and service suspended indefinitely due to financial constraints with no set plans to resume operation. Furthermore, a Vancouver City Council report published in March 2014 recommended against reviving service on the heritage line.

When last operational in 2011, the line ran from Granville Island to Olympic Village Station, however, Olympics-related construction razed the section of line east of the Cambie Bridge.

== Fleet of heritage railcars ==
Make/Model	Description	Fleet size	Year built	Year retired	Notes
Built in New Westminster, British Columbia	Interurban car	3 - only 1207 remains	1905	1958	ex-British Columbia Electric Railway
St. Louis Car Company	Interurban car	Originally 20; 5 survive - 1231	1912	1958	ex-British Columbia Electric Railway

The fleet also includes an ex-Brussels La Brugeoise et Nivelles PCC-style streetcar, painted red and cream.

The line's operator, the Transit Museum Society, also owns a large fleet of vintage buses and trolley coaches.

== Olympic Line ==
Olympic Line
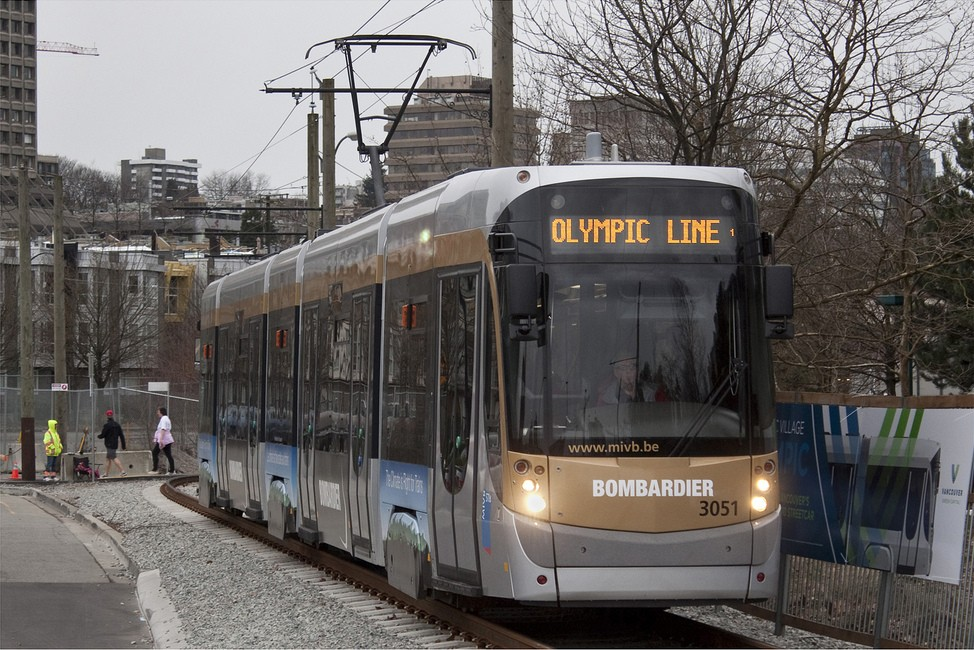
- Olympic Line near the Olympic Village station

Overview
- Status: Indefinitely suspended
- Owner: City of Vancouver
- Locale: Vancouver, British Columbia
- Termini: Olympic Village; Granville Island
- Stations: 2

Service
- Type: Tram
- Services: 1
- Operator(s): City of Vancouver; Bombardier Transportation
- Rolling stock: Bombardier Flexity Outlook Cityrunner

History
- Opened: January 21, 2010
- Closed: March 21, 2010

Technical
- Track gauge: 1,435 mm (4 ft 8 1/2 in)
- Old gauge: 4 ft 8 1/2 in (1,435 mm)
- Electrification: 600 V DC

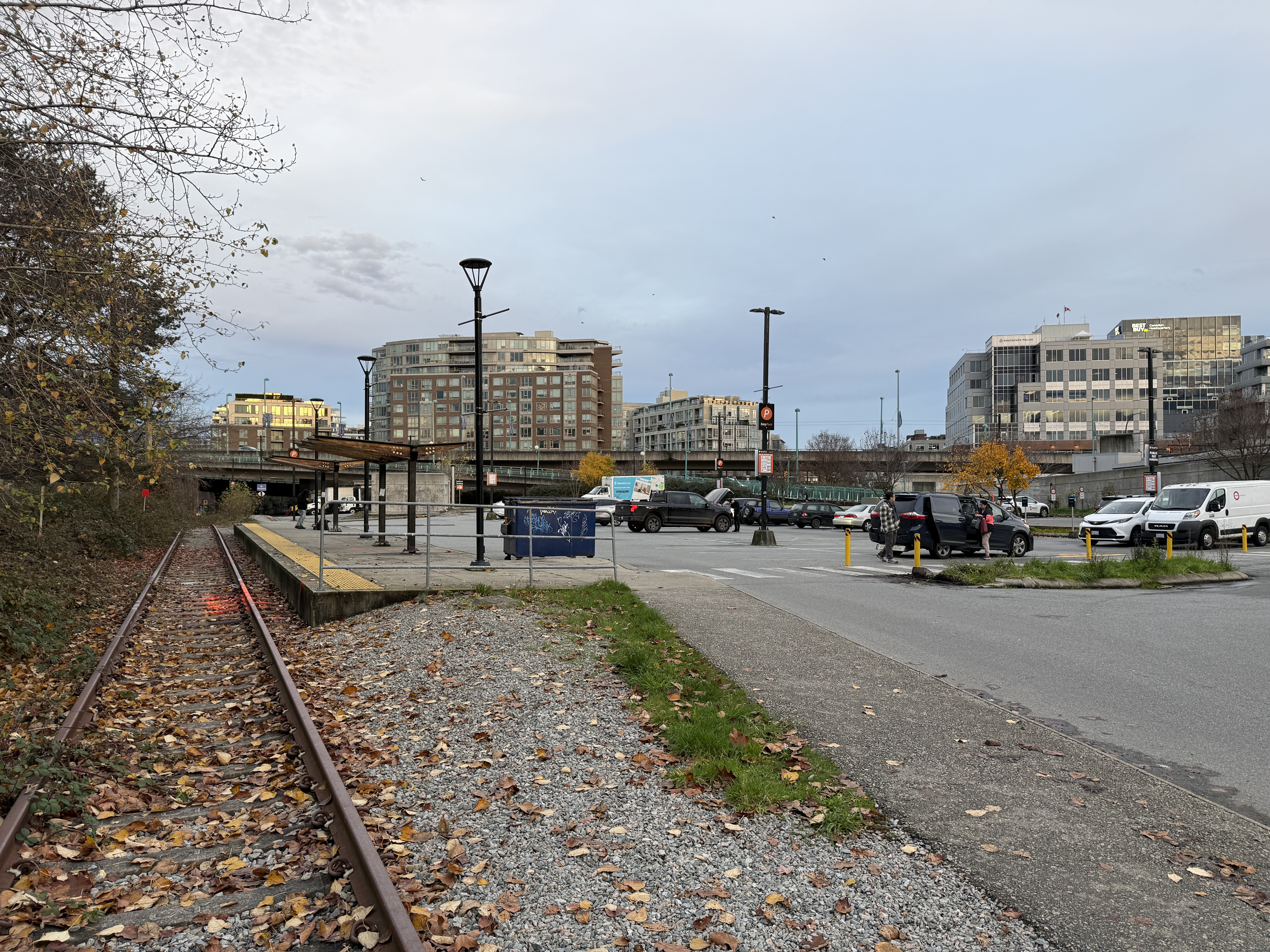
Olympic Demonstration Line in 2025

From January 21 to March 21, 2010, a 1.8-kilometre (1.1 mi) free demonstration service called the "Olympic Line" (named for the 2010 Winter Olympics) ran every six minutes, 18 hours a day on the Downtown Historic Railway between Olympic Village station and Granville Island, using two modern Bombardier Flexity Outlook streetcars, No. 3050 and No. 3051, leased from the Brussels tram system. The City of Vancouver and the administrators of Granville Island paid $8.5 million for associated upgrades to the infrastructure.

The two stations were single side platforms with two shelters providing partial coverage from the elements. The Olympic Village station shared the parking lot with existing Canada Line station at West 2nd Avenue and Cambie Street. The Granville Island station was only accessible via foot from Anderson Street and Lamey's Mill Road below the Granville Street Bridge and Highway 99.

Station	Connections	Location	Notes
Granville Island	Route 50 - Waterfront Station - False Creek South	Anderson Street and Lamey's Mill Road	Single sided platform with shelters
Olympic Village	Canada Line; Route 15 Cambie - Olympic Village Station Route 50 - Waterfront Station - False Creek South Route 84 - VCC–Clark Station - UBC	West 2nd Avenue and Cambie Street	Single sided platform with shelters. Shared parking with Olympic Village station

The City considered the streetcar demonstration "a tremendous success", with over 550,000 boardings during the two months of the experiment. Bombardier received an award for "Exceptional Performance and Outstanding Achievement" at the 2010 CUTA awards, recognizing its operation of over 13,000 one-way trips with zero equipment failures, zero station delays and zero injuries. Former mayor Gregor Robertson indicated a desire to continue operation of the line, with a potential extension to Main Street-Science World station via False Creek South, but mentioned that the city alone lacks the millions of dollars needed to complete the construction and equipment purchases. Nonetheless, a streetcar along the alignment used by the Olympic Line was part of two of the proposals for rapid transit running east–west through the city of Vancouver for 2020.

== Proposed future service ==
The proposal for a full-service modern streetcar line would extend the former heritage line through Chinatown and Gastown to Waterfront Station, and eventually to Stanley Park. There would be a separate line into Yaletown with longer-term potential for a number of other lines.

On October 13, 2014, Emily Jackson, writing in Metro Vancouver Newspaper, reported that Friends of the Olympic Line called on Vancouver City Council to commit $5 million to incorporate a refurbished line into Vancouver's transit authority. (Note: Beginning in the fall of 2014, Friends of the Olympic Line / Vancouver Civic Railway established a Facebook page, and later a web site (VCRail.ca) to outline a proposal, based on discussions with stake holders, and particularly in response to the Granville Island 2040 presentation. Productive talks with private investors during 2017 have gone very well, and City of Vancouver Engineering Department and TransLink have become part of the conversation. The proposal calls for modern fully accessible replica streetcars, possibly different models representing different eras of streetcars that operated in Vancouver. Resumption of service on Phase 0 (Granville Island to Cambie St.) is expected by spring of 2020.) The organization has called for the line to be extended to Main Street–Science World Station. The city has allocated $400,000 to decommission the line's former route.

In a 2021 report a two line light rail network (12 km and 25 stations) using most of the old route of the heritage line as well as new routing was estimated to be in the $1.1 billion range.

== See also ==
- List of heritage railways in Canada
- List of museums in Canada
- TransLink (British Columbia)
