= Main Street–Science World station =

Metro Vancouver SkyTrain station

Main Street–Science World
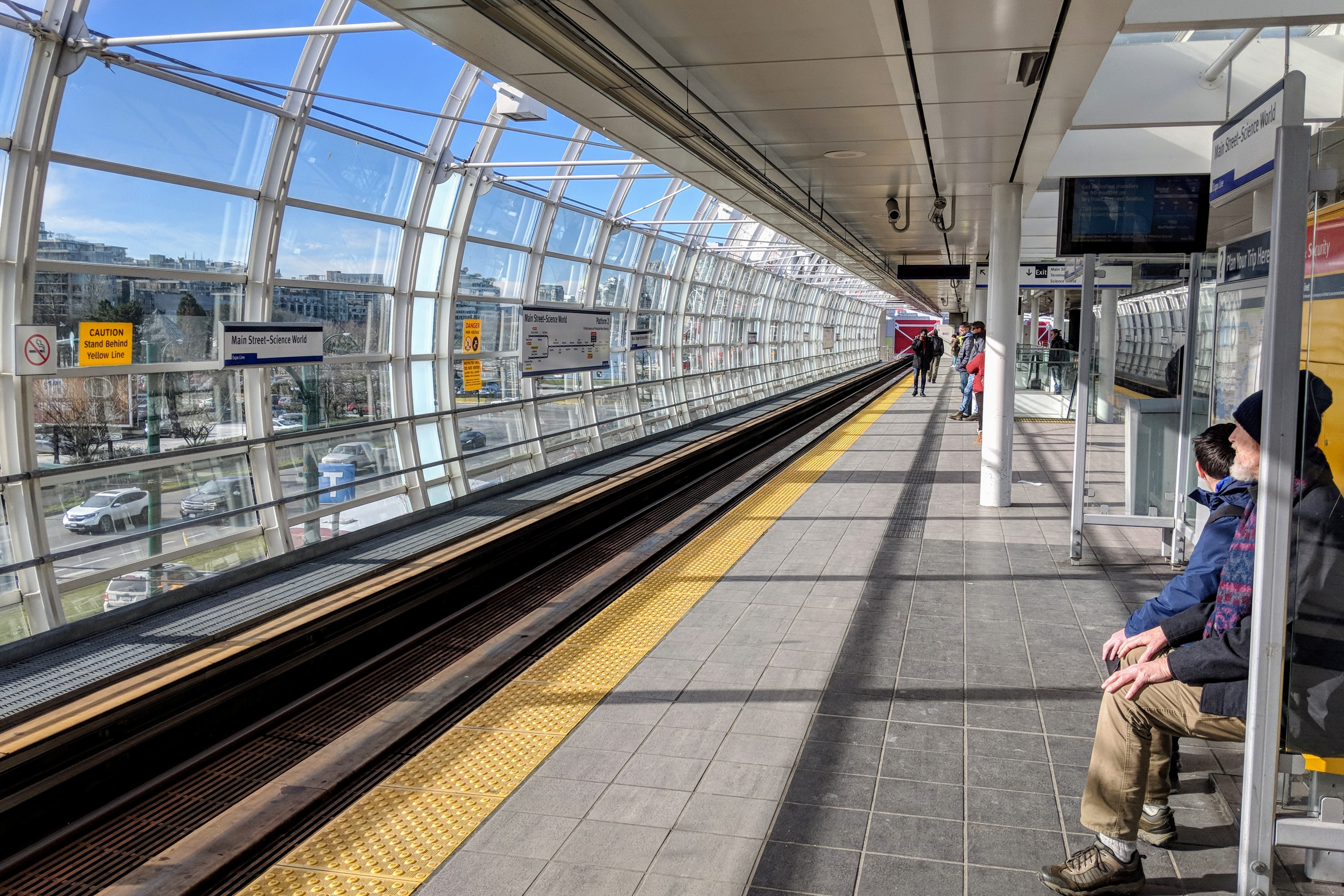
- Platform level at Main Street–Science World

General information
- Location: 1399 Main Street, Vancouver
- Coordinates: 49.273114°N 123.100348°W
- System: SkyTrain station
- Owner: TransLink
- Platforms: Centre platform
- Tracks: 2
- Connections: Pacific Central Station

Construction
- Structure type: Elevated
- Accessible: yes

Other information
- Station code: MN
- Fare zone: 1

History
- Opened: December 11, 1985; 40 years ago
- Rebuilt: 2013–2016; 10 years ago
- Former names: Main Street (1985–1990)

Passengers
- 2025: 3,620,000 ▼5.4%
- Rank: 15 of 54

Services
Preceding station	TransLink	Following station
Stadium–Chinatown towards Waterfront	Expo Line	Commercial–Broadway towards King George or Production Way–University
Location

Main Street–Science World (formerly Main Street) is an elevated station on the Expo Line of Metro Vancouver's SkyTrain rapid transit system in Vancouver, British Columbia, Canada. The station is accessible from both sides of Main Street at the intersection of Main Street and Terminal Avenue and is adjacent to Pacific Central Station, the city's inter-city railway and bus terminal.

== History ==
Prior to SkyTrain's opening, the station served as the western terminus of a short 1-kilometre (0.62 mi) demonstration track during the summer of 1983. A single two-car prototype train ran both eastbound and westbound on the current westbound track, between the station and what was at that time the end of the completed guideway, at the eastern end of the centre median of Terminal Avenue.

In December 1985, SkyTrain began service with the station opening as "Main Street station". It was one of two stations that served the Expo 86 site, the other being Stadium station. This station served as an access point to the east gate of Expo 86. It was also the first elevated SkyTrain station to have buildings built around and above it, as seen with the Vancity tower on the west side of the station.

Once Expo 86 had ended, many of its buildings were either torn down or removed. One of the few to remain was the nearby geodesic dome, known during the fair as "Expo Centre", and now one of the city's most recognizable landmarks. A science museum known as Science World subsequently moved into that space and, on September 21, 1990, the station's name was hyphenated, becoming "Main Street–Science World" due to its proximity to the popular landmark attraction one block away. Older signage referred to the station as "Science World–Main Street".

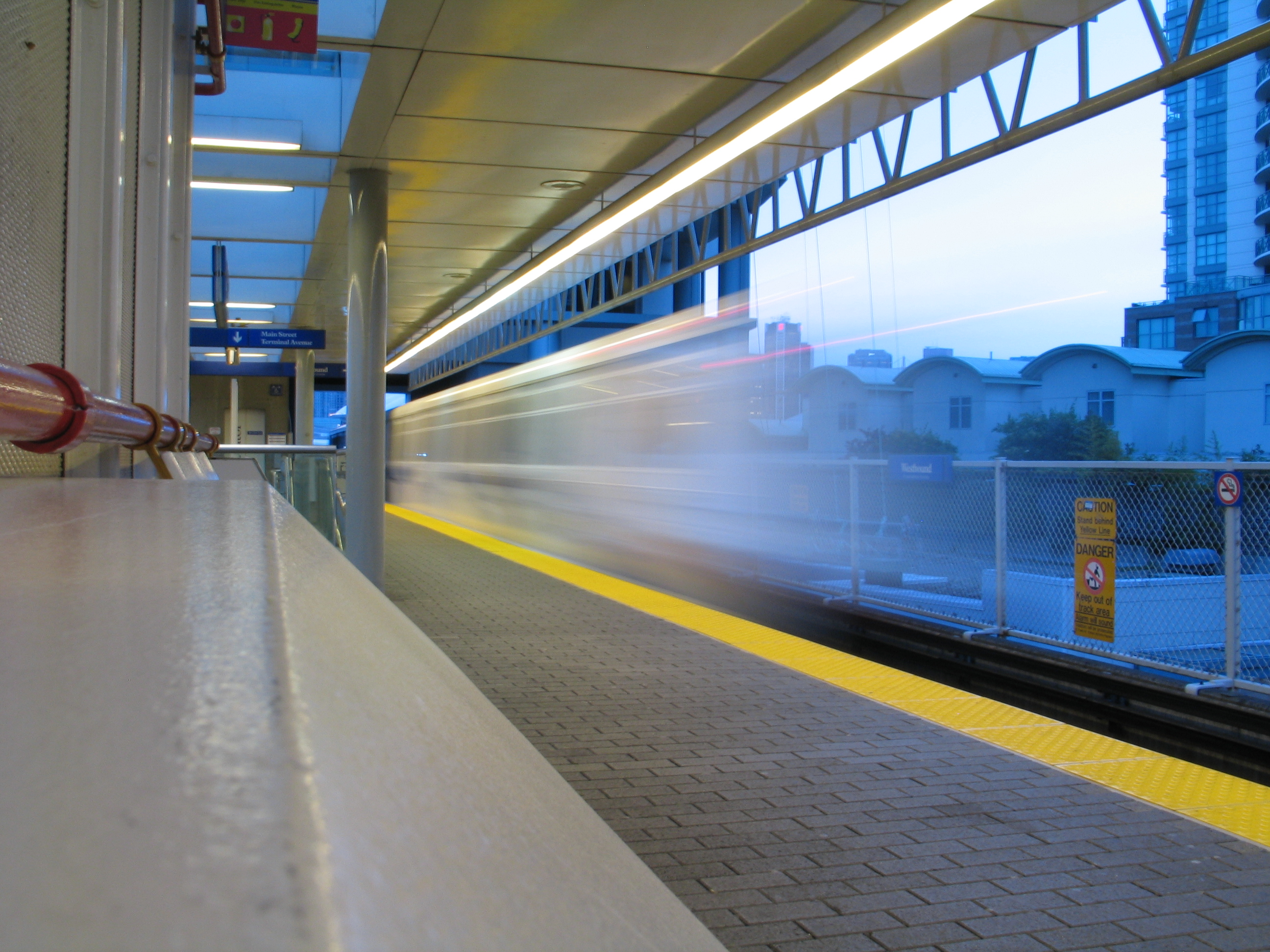
Platform level in 2006, prior to the 2013–2016 renovations

As part of a plan to upgrade high-traffic stations along the Expo Line, and to enable the addition of fare gates to the station in conjunction with the broader system-wide Compass smartcard initiative, construction began on a major refurbishment of Main Street–Science World in early 2013. In 2014, due to ongoing construction, the platform length was shortened, preventing four- and six-car trains from stopping at the station. As a result, TransLink introduced the Train2Main service, which consisted of a two-car shuttle train that served the station and ran between Waterfront and Commercial–Broadway stations, with longer trains skipping Main Street–Science World during this period. This service ran between March 30 and December 6, 2014.

On May 18, 2014, the new east stationhouse opened. Simultaneously, the west stationhouse closed for renovations. Construction work on the west stationhouse was completed on February 5, 2016, and resulted in improved accessibility, passenger safety, and lighting, along with the addition of fare gates months after they had launched at most other stations in the system.

== Services ==
- The Main Street–Science World station is a major connection point for the TransLink Main Street trolley bus routes, as well as for the Via Rail and Amtrak trains that arrive and depart from the nearby Pacific Central station.
- The eastern terminus of the defunct Downtown Historic Railway was located near this station; that line's streetcars ran westbound along the south side of False Creek to Granville Island.
- The eastern terminus of both False Creek Ferries and the Aquabus can also be found nearby just south of Science World.
- The station complex includes several restaurants at ground level.

== Station information ==
=== Entrances ===
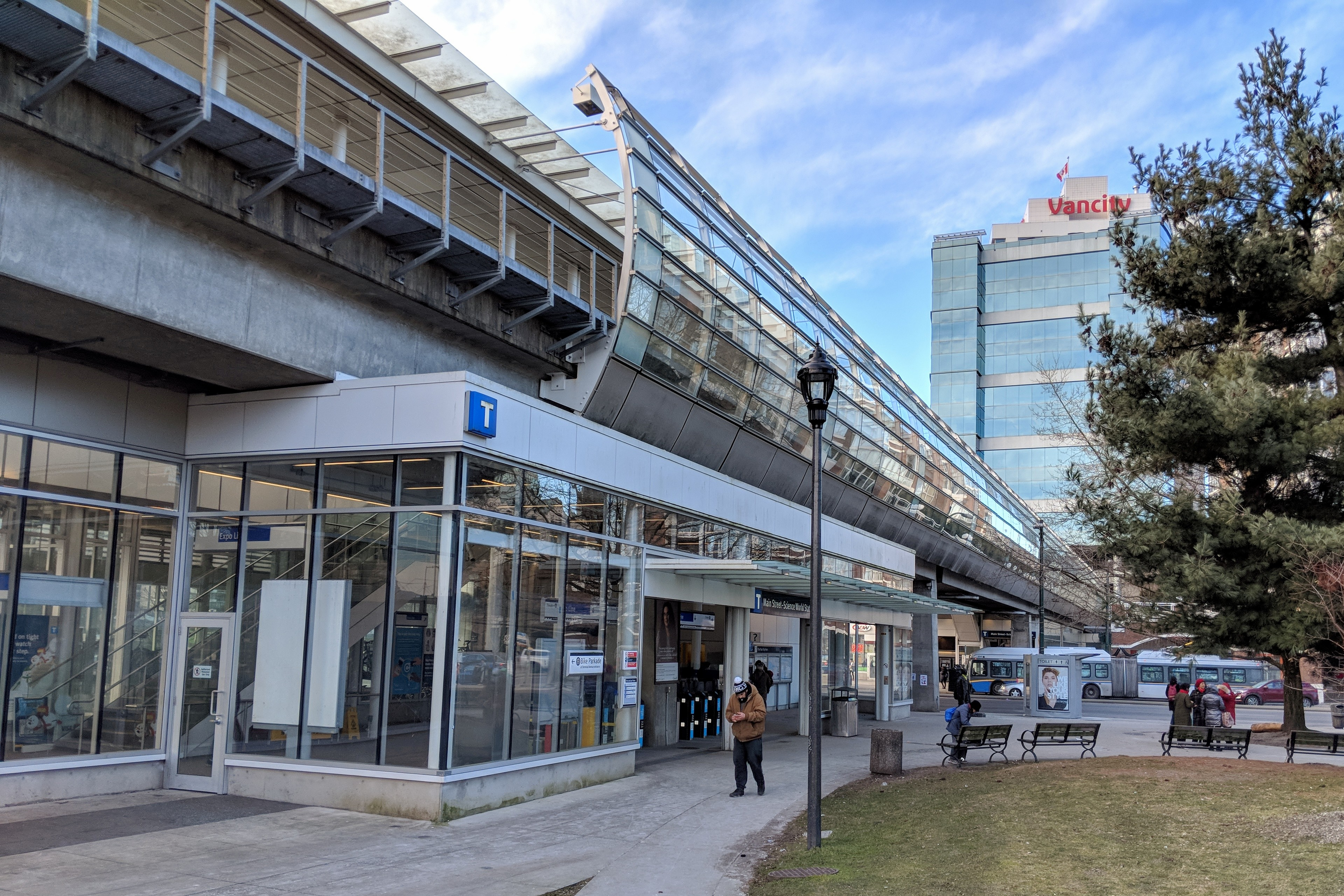
The Thornton Park entrance is located on the east side of Main Street.

- West entrance: located at west end of Main Street, serving to Science World and the False Creek ferries. Up and down escalators are available between street and platform levels as well as an elevator.
- East entrance: located on the east side of Main Street, beside Thornton Park and in close proximity to Pacific Central Station for long-distance rail and bus services. There is a station house including an elevator and up escalator access from street to platform level.

=== Transit connections ===
- Transit connections includes local bus routes travelling southbound on Main Street, near the west entrance:
  - 3 Main
  - 8 Fraser
  - 19 Metrotown Station
  - N8 Fraser NightBus
  - N19 Surrey Central Station NightBus
- One block north of the station on Main St, southbound near National Avenue:
  - 3 Main
  - 8 Fraser
  - 19 Metrotown Station
  - 22 Knight (AM peak hours only)
  - N8 Fraser NightBus
  - N19 Surrey Central Station NightBus
- Community shuttle service from the 23 English Bay is also available northbound on Station Street beside Pacific Central station, one block away from the east station entrance. The 23 also stops southbound on Quebec Street, one block away from the west station entrance beside Science World.
- The east entrance serves local bus routes travelling northbound on Main Street:
  - 3 Downtown
  - 8 Downtown
  - 19 Stanley Park
  - 22 Downtown
  - N8 Downtown NightBus
  - N19 Downtown NightBus
