= Granville Island =

Peninsula and shopping district in Vancouver, BC, Canada

sən̓aʔqʷ (Hunʼqumiʼnum); Sen̓áḵw (Squamish)
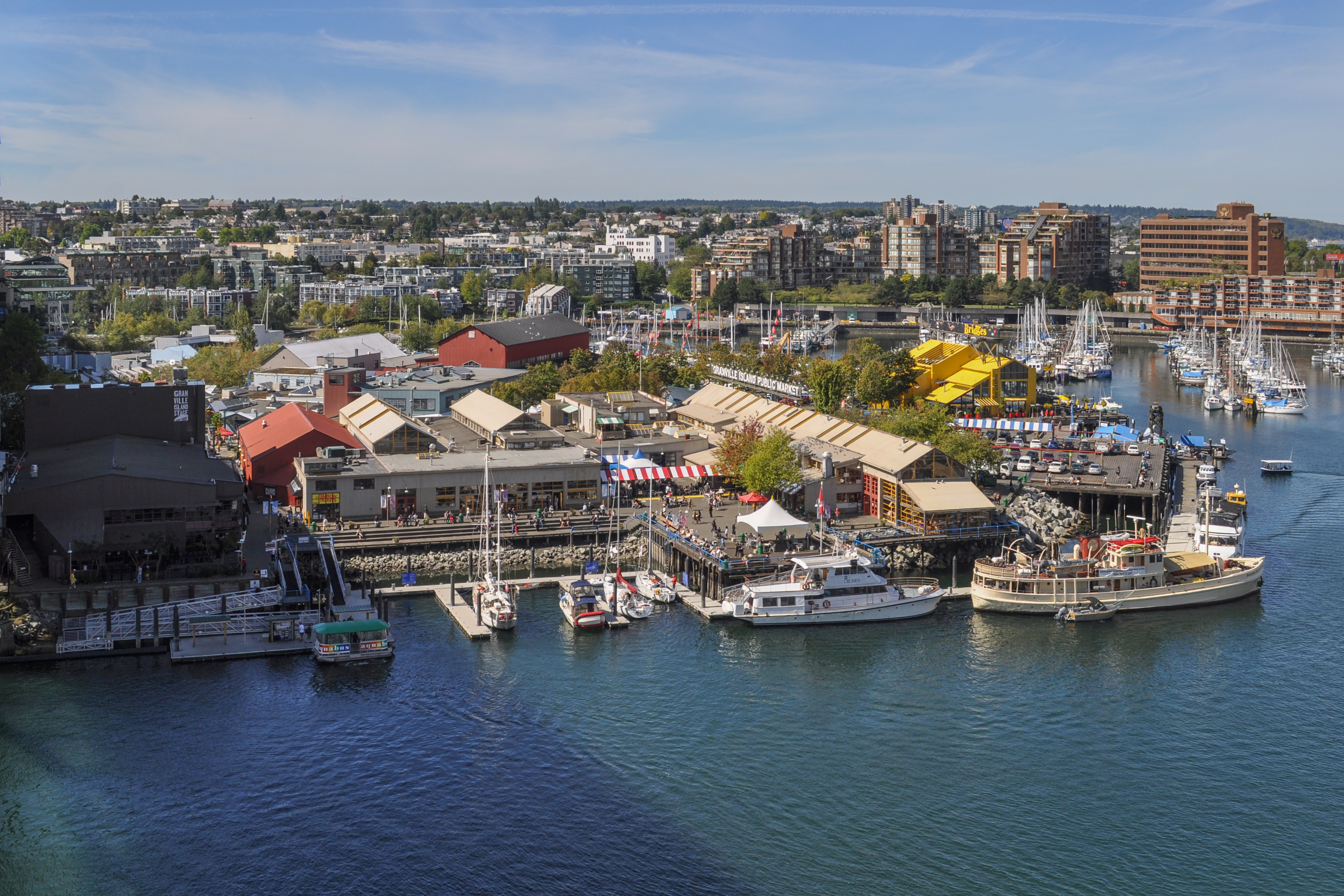
- Northwest Granville Island in 2010. The large complex in the centre is the Granville Island Public Market. Logo of Granville Island

- Location within Downtown Vancouver (British Columbia)
- Interactive map of Granville Island

Geography
- Location: Vancouver
- Coordinates: 49°16′15″N 123°08′03″W
- Archipelago: peninsula
- Adjacent to: False Creek
- Area: 14 ha (35 acres)

Administration
- Canada

Additional information
- Official website: granvilleisland.com

Granville Island is a peninsula and shopping district in the Fairview neighbourhood of Vancouver, British Columbia, Canada, across False Creek from Downtown Vancouver, under the south end of the Granville Street Bridge. Formerly an industrial manufacturing area, it was named after Granville Leveson-Gower, 2nd Earl Granville.

The area is managed by the Canada Mortgage and Housing Corporation and includes a public market, restaurants, a marina, a hotel, the False Creek Community Centre, numerous artists' studios and workshops, and various performing arts theatres, including the Arts Club Theatre Company and Carousel Theatre.

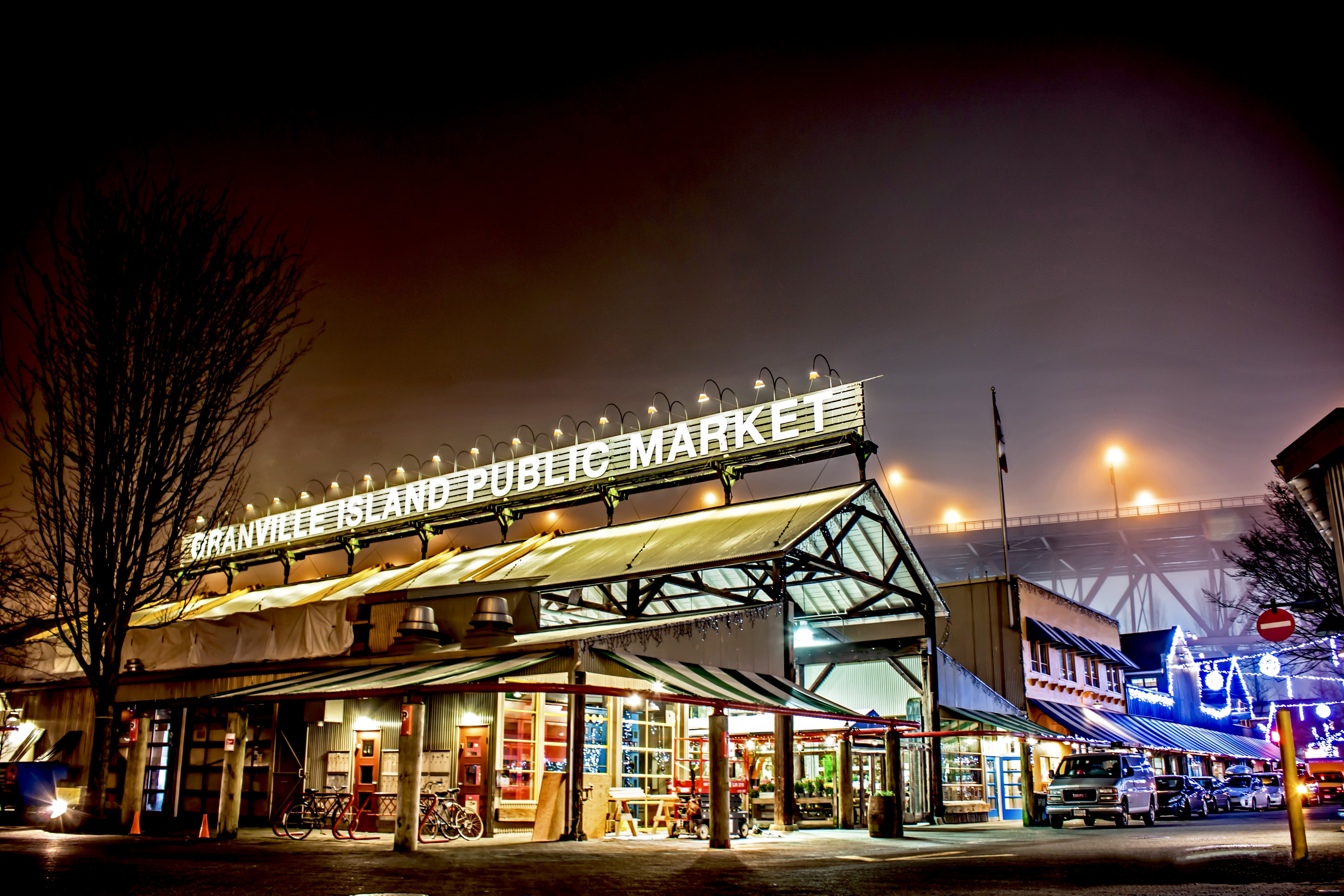
Granville Island Public Market

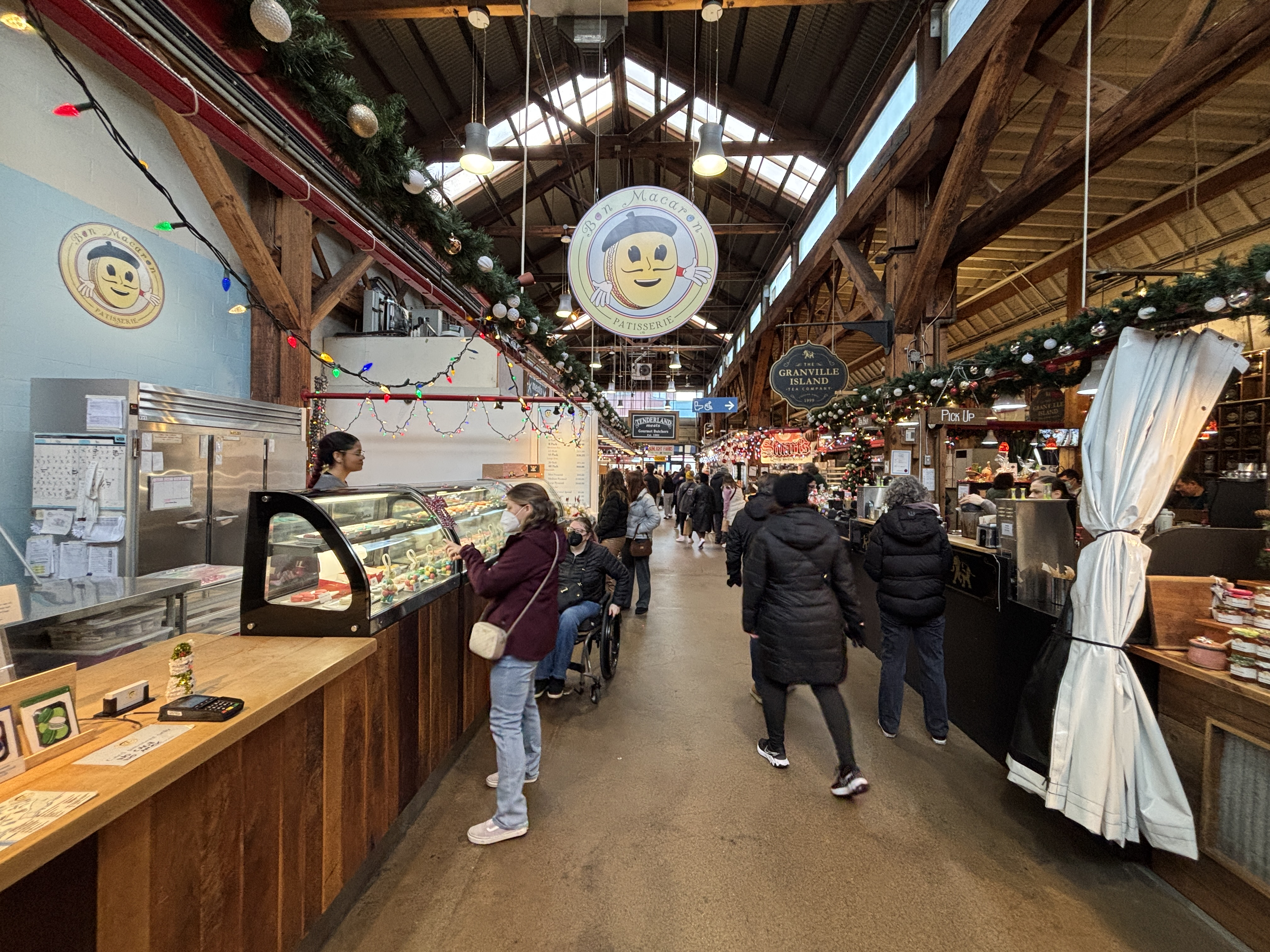
Public Market food stall

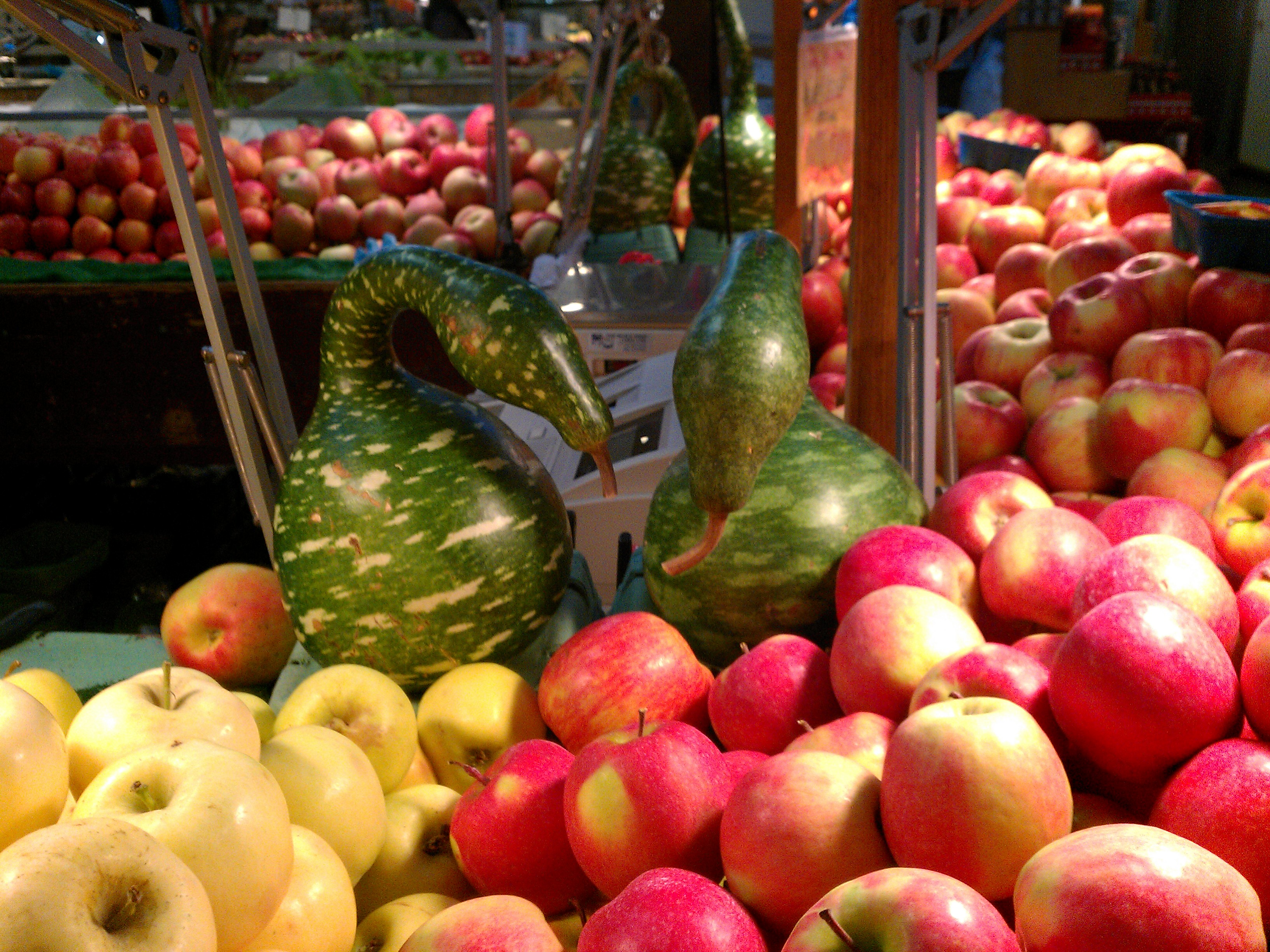
Apples and calabash "geese" at the Granville Island Public Market, 2011

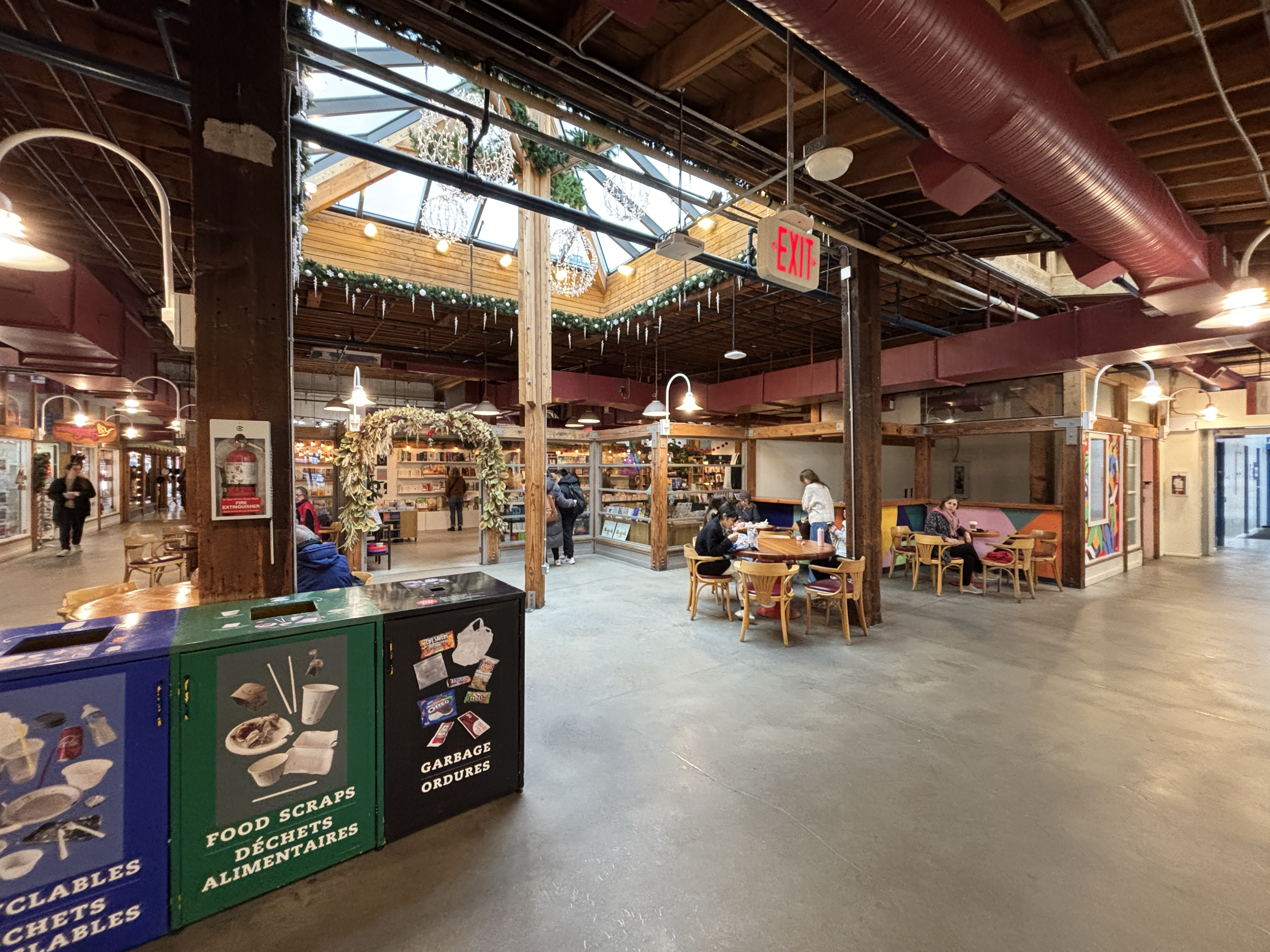
Net Loft in Granville Island

It was the location for the finale of the film Mission: Impossible – Ghost Protocol (2011). The Great Canadian Pottery Throw Down, first broadcast in 2024, was filmed in the area.

The Vancouver International Children's Festival, the Vancouver Fringe Festival, and the Vancouver Writers Fest are held there, as are concert series of the Vancouver International Jazz Festival.

== Transportation ==
False Creek Ferries and Aquabus provide ferry service from Granville Island to Downtown Vancouver, Yaletown, False Creek, the West End, and Vanier Park. Other water transportation options include a water taxi service to Bowen Island provided by English Bay Launch.

WESTCOAST Sightseeing and Vancouver Trolley Hop-On, Hop-Off services have stops there.

Between 1998 and 2011, the Vancouver Downtown Historic Railway operated between Granville Island and Science World. The streetcar is now permanently shut down.

== History ==
The peninsula was originally used by the Musqueam and Squamish peoples as a fishing area. A village was established in the area named sən̓aʔqʷ in the Hunʼqumiʼnum language and Sen̓áḵw in the Squamish language.

The city of Vancouver was called Granville until it was renamed in 1886, but the former name was kept and given to Granville Street, which spanned the small inlet known as False Creek. False Creek in the late 19th century was more than twice today's size, and its tidal flats included a large permanent sandbar over which spanned the original, rickety, wooden Granville Street bridge. This sandbar, which would eventually become Granville Island, was first mapped by Captain George Henry Richards in the British Boundary Commission's naval expedition in 1858–59, and the island today conforms roughly to the size and shape documented at that time. A British Admiralty Chart of 1893 shows the island in greater detail and conforming even more accurately to today's Granville Island.

Shortly after the creation of the original Granville Street bridge in 1889, the first, unofficial, attempt was made to stabilize the sandbar by driving piles around the perimeter in order to create some free real estate. The Federal government put a stop to the work as a menace to navigation, but the piles remain visible in a photo taken in 1891.

In 1915, with the port of Vancouver growing, the newly formed Vancouver Harbour Commission approved a reclamation project in False Creek for an industrial area. A 14-hectare (35-acre) island, connected to the mainland by a combined road and rail bridge at its south end, was to be built. Almost 760,000 cubic metres (1,000,000 cu yd) of fill was dredged largely by a man named Alvin Kingston, from the surrounding waters of False Creek to create the island under the Granville Street Bridge. The total cost for the reclamation was $342,000. It was originally called Industrial Island, but Granville Island, named after the bridge, that ran directly overhead, was the name that stuck.

The first tenant, B.C. Equipment Ltd., set the standard by building a wood-framed machine shop, clad on all sides in corrugated tin, at the Island's western end. (Today the same structure houses part of the Granville Island Public Market.) The company repaired and assembled heavy equipment for mining and forestry industries and used barges for shipping.

By 1923, virtually every lot on the Island was occupied, mostly by similar corrugated-tin factories.

During the Great Depression, one of Vancouver's several hobo jungles sprang up on the False Creek flats opposite Granville Island's north shore. "Shackers" lived on the island, in town, or in floathouses, and survived by fishing and beachcombing and sold salmon, smelt, and wood door to door or at the public market on Main Street.

During the Second World War, Wright's Canadian Ropes on the island was Canada's biggest manufacturer of heavy-duty wire rope. Their Green Heart product was supplied to forestry and mining industries. A fire in 1953 gutted their Granville Island factory so they moved to south Vancouver in 1956. In 1972, a federal order-in-council assigned management of the 14-hectare site to Canada Mortgage and Housing Corporation (CMHC). The federal government invested $24.7 million there between 1973 and 1982. In 1979, the federal and provincial governments converted a 50,000 square foot building to the Public Market. In 1980, the Emily Carr University of Art & Design was added to the island.

Ron Basford, the Minister responsible for CMHC, was referred to as Mr. Granville and was later recognized with the naming of Ron Basford Park on Granville Island.

In 2016, the federal government announced a commitment to develop a 2040 plan to redevelop the island, in part because the Emily Carr University was going to move off the island.

== Businesses ==
=== Granville Island Public Market ===
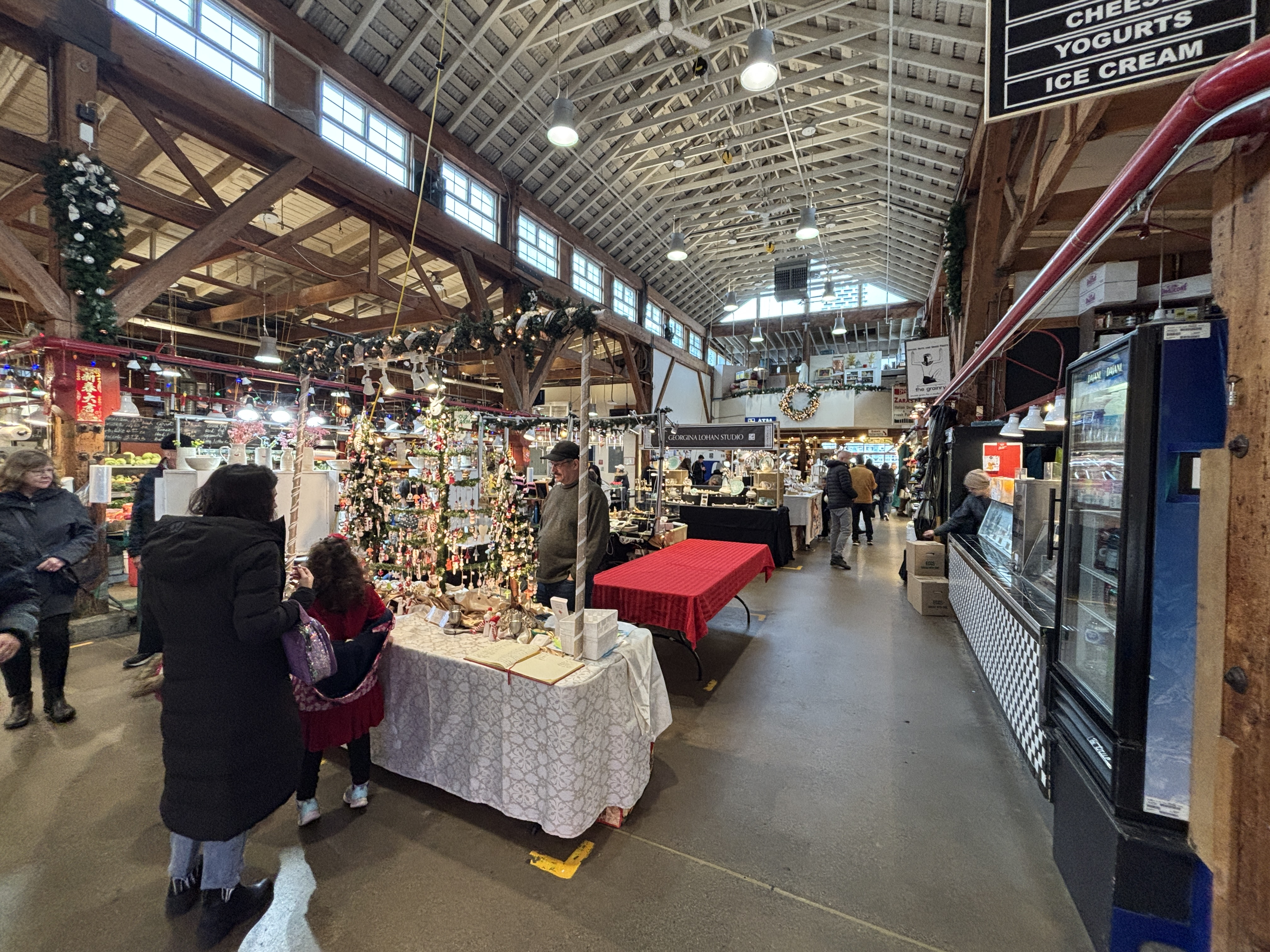
Stalls in the public market

The Granville Island Public Market was established in 1979 as a place where farmers and other food vendors could sell to consumers. It operates year-round in an enclosed facility where visitors can purchase fresh produce, meat, fish and seafood, cheeses and other products, many locally sourced. There are generally 50 vendors selling a wide range of items, from Mexican, Asian, Greek and deli food to candy and snacks. A large scenic outdoor eating area adjacent to it overlooks downtown Vancouver. The Market attracts both local residents and tourists, and includes a "kids' market" for children.

=== Other businesses ===
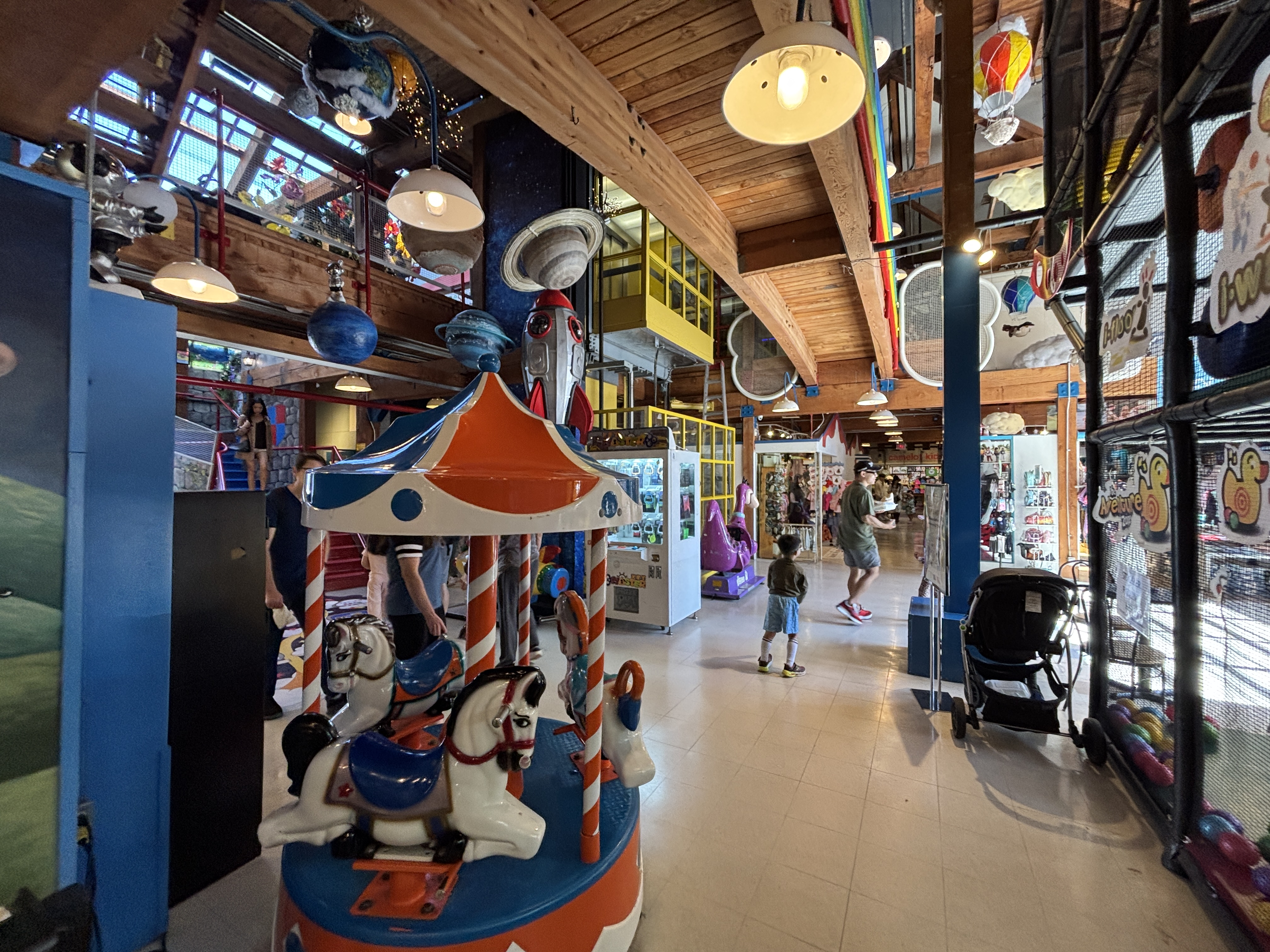
Kids Market

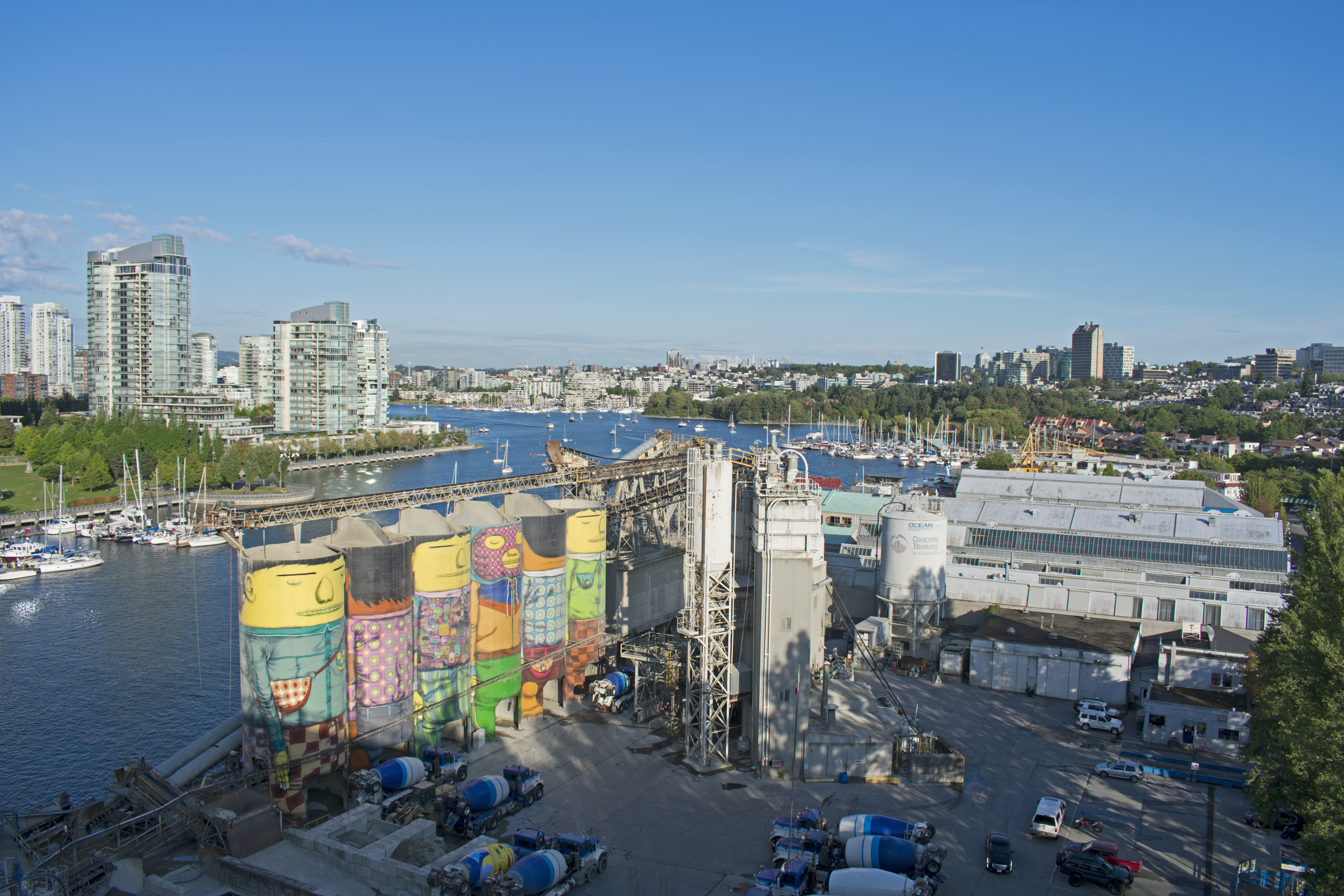
Ocean Concrete

Granville Island Brewing Co. is a beer company founded on Granville Island in 1984, but whose main base of operations was moved to Kelowna, British Columbia sometime later. In 2009 it was purchased by Molson's Brewery and continues to brew small batches of its varieties at the original Granville Island brewing site. It offers beer tasting and brewery tours.

Ocean Concrete is the island's longest-established tenant, since 1917. In 2014, OSGEMEOS (Portuguese for THE TWINS), consisting of brother duo Gustavo and Otavio Pandolfo, made the concrete silos the site of their ongoing mural project, 'Giants'.

Granville Island is home to several theatre companies, including as the Arts Club Theatre Company, Arts Umbrella, Axis Theatre Company, Boca Del Lupo, Carousel Theatre for Young People, Ruby Slippers Production Company, and the Vancouver Theatre Sports League improv troupe.

Canada's oldest physical hammock shop, the Hamuhk Hangout Place, has operated on Granville Island since 1995.

== Gallery ==
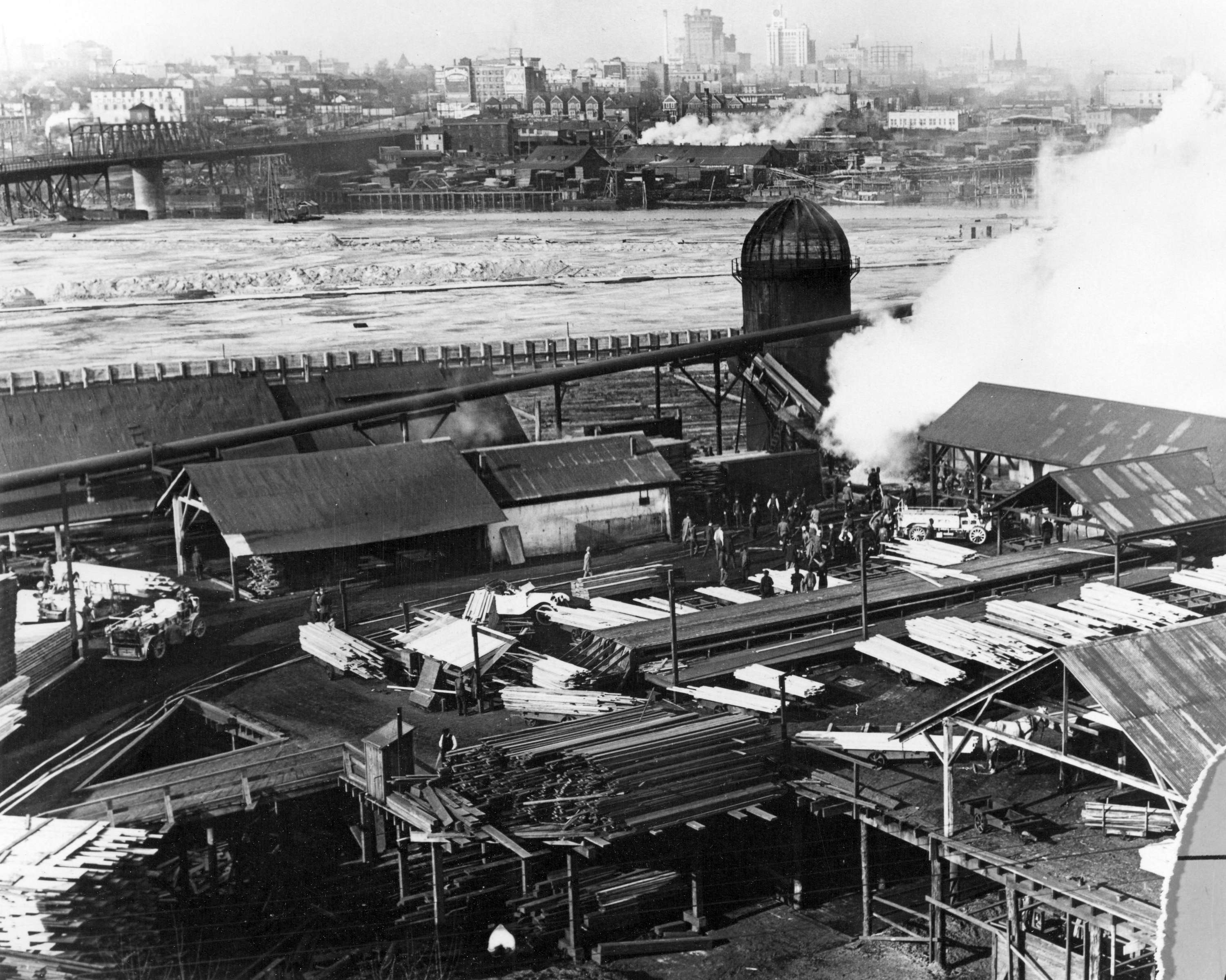
Sawmill at Granville Island in 1917

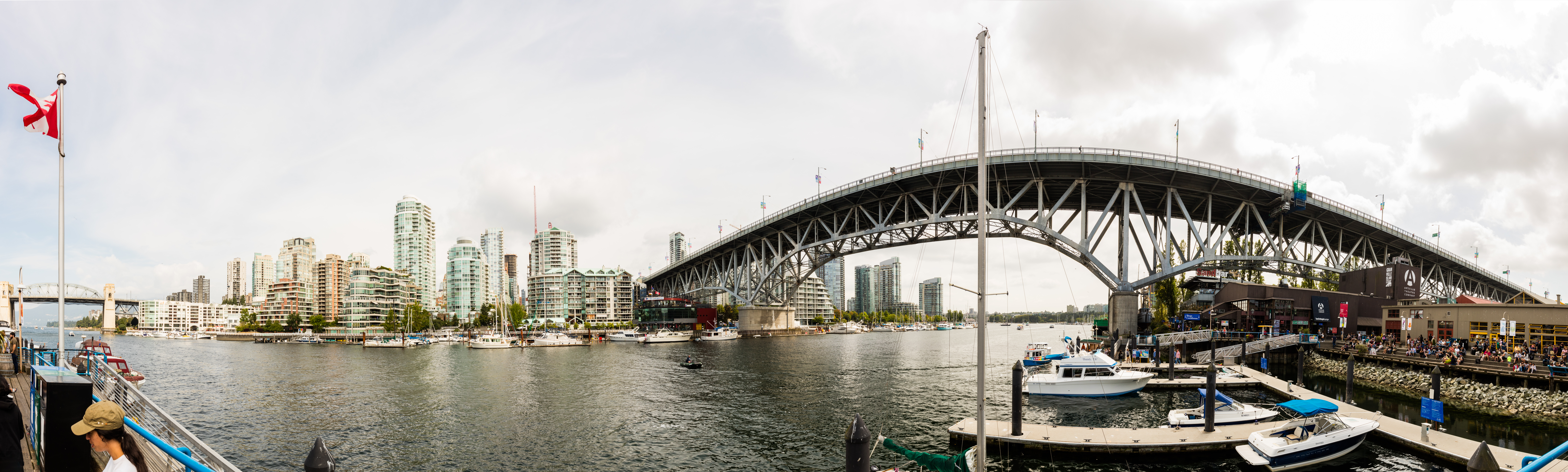
Vancouver seen from Granville Island

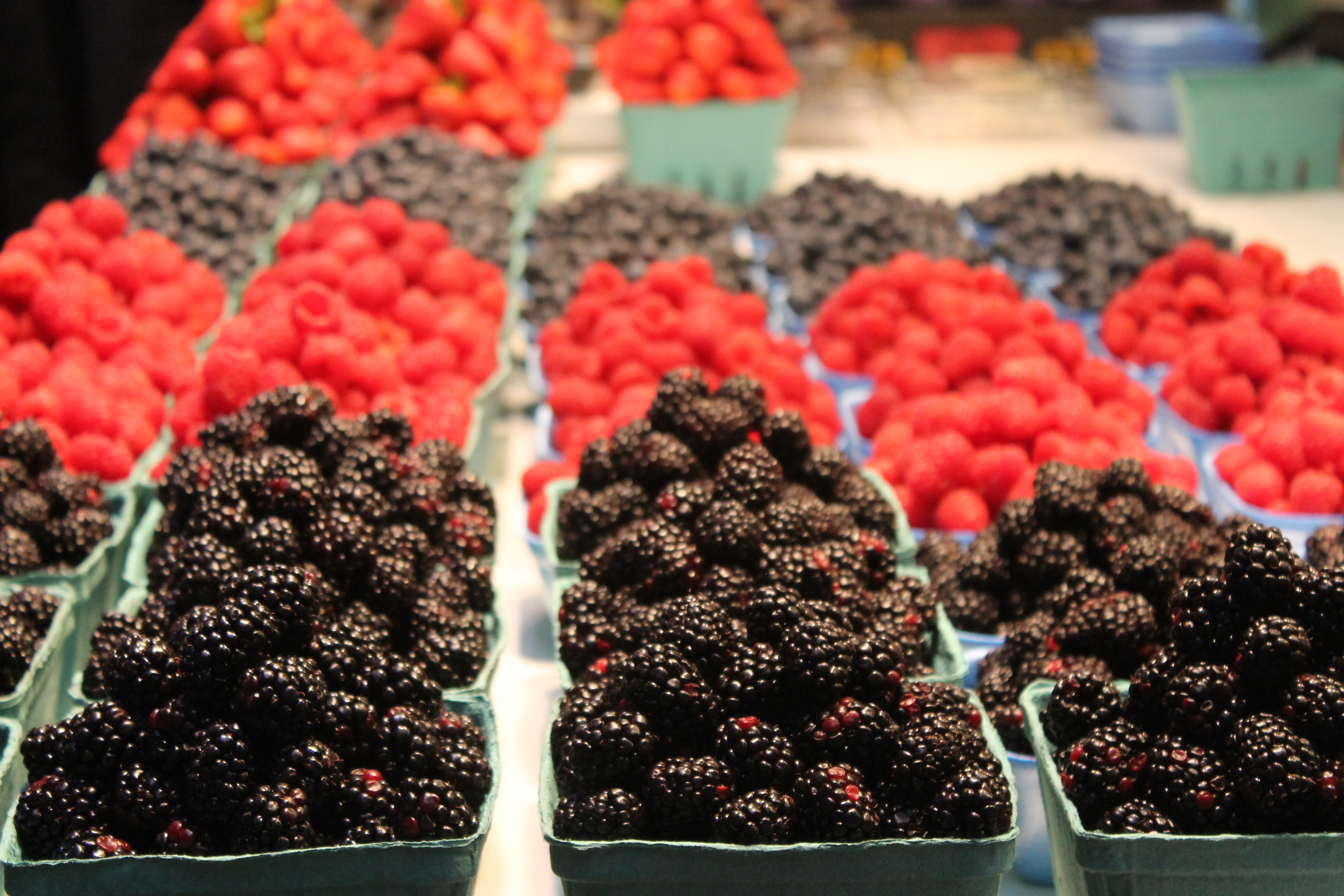
Fresh berries at the Granville Island Public Market

Granville Island entrance

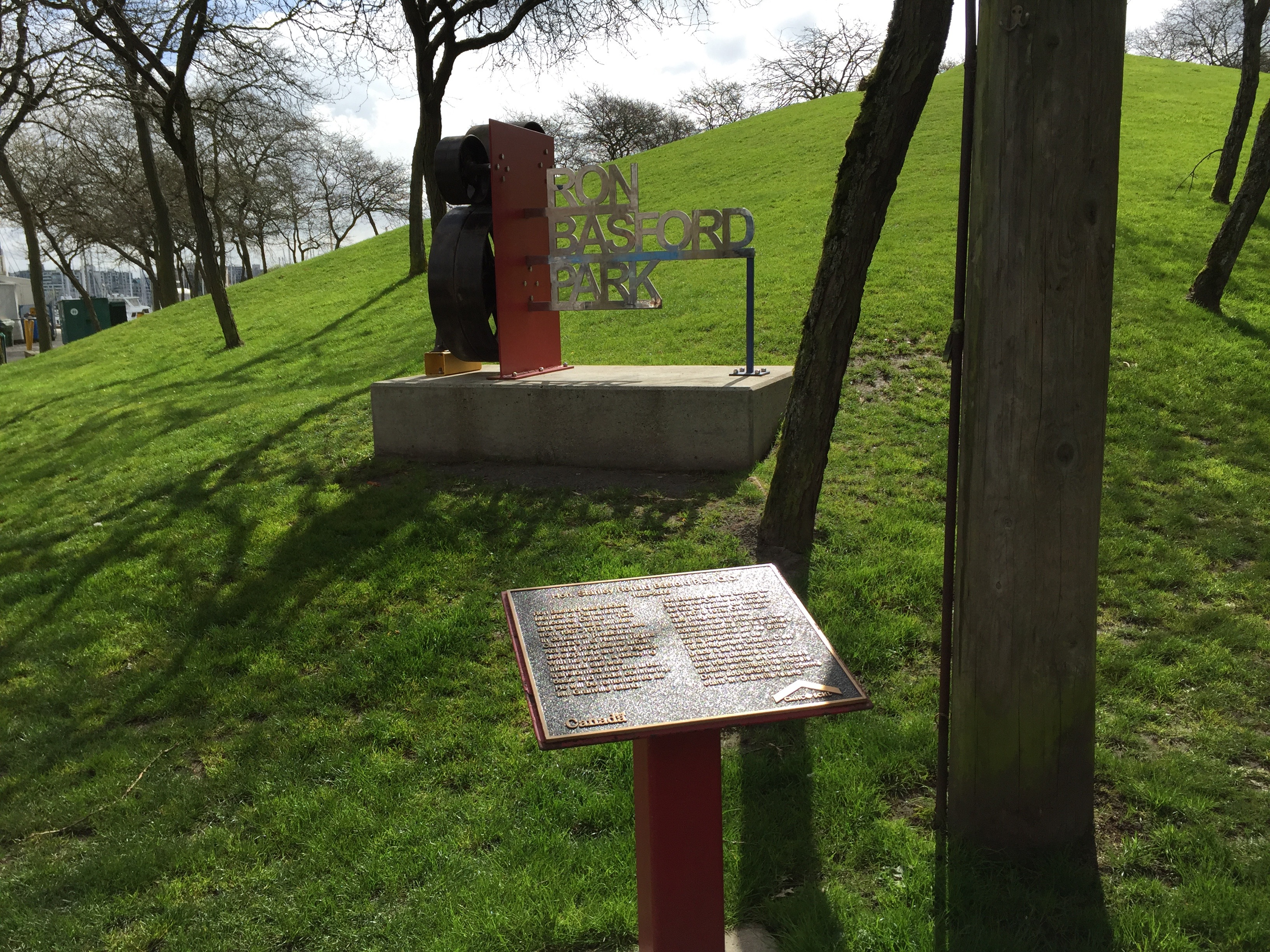
Hill in center of Ron Basford Park in Granville Island

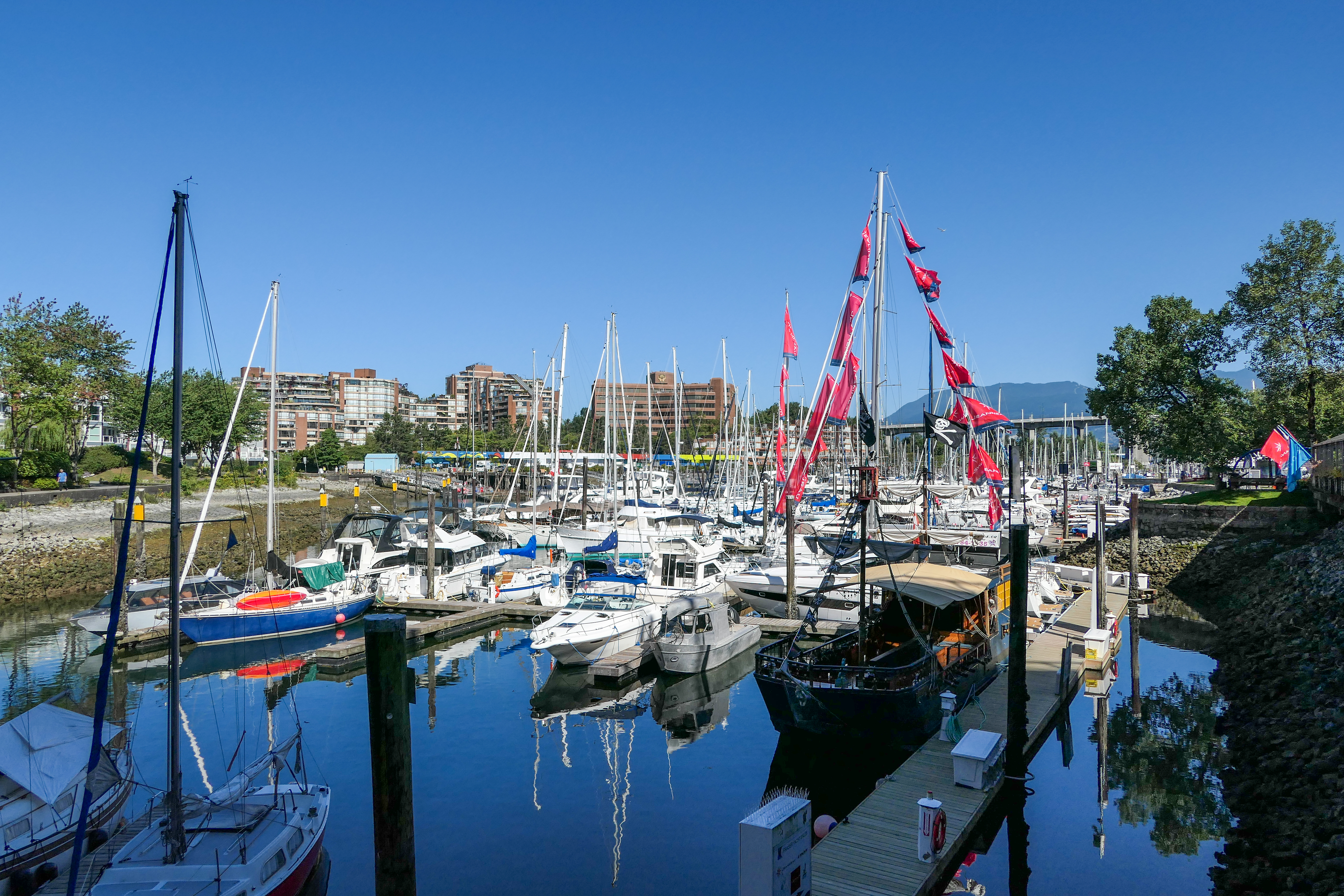
Granville Island Marina

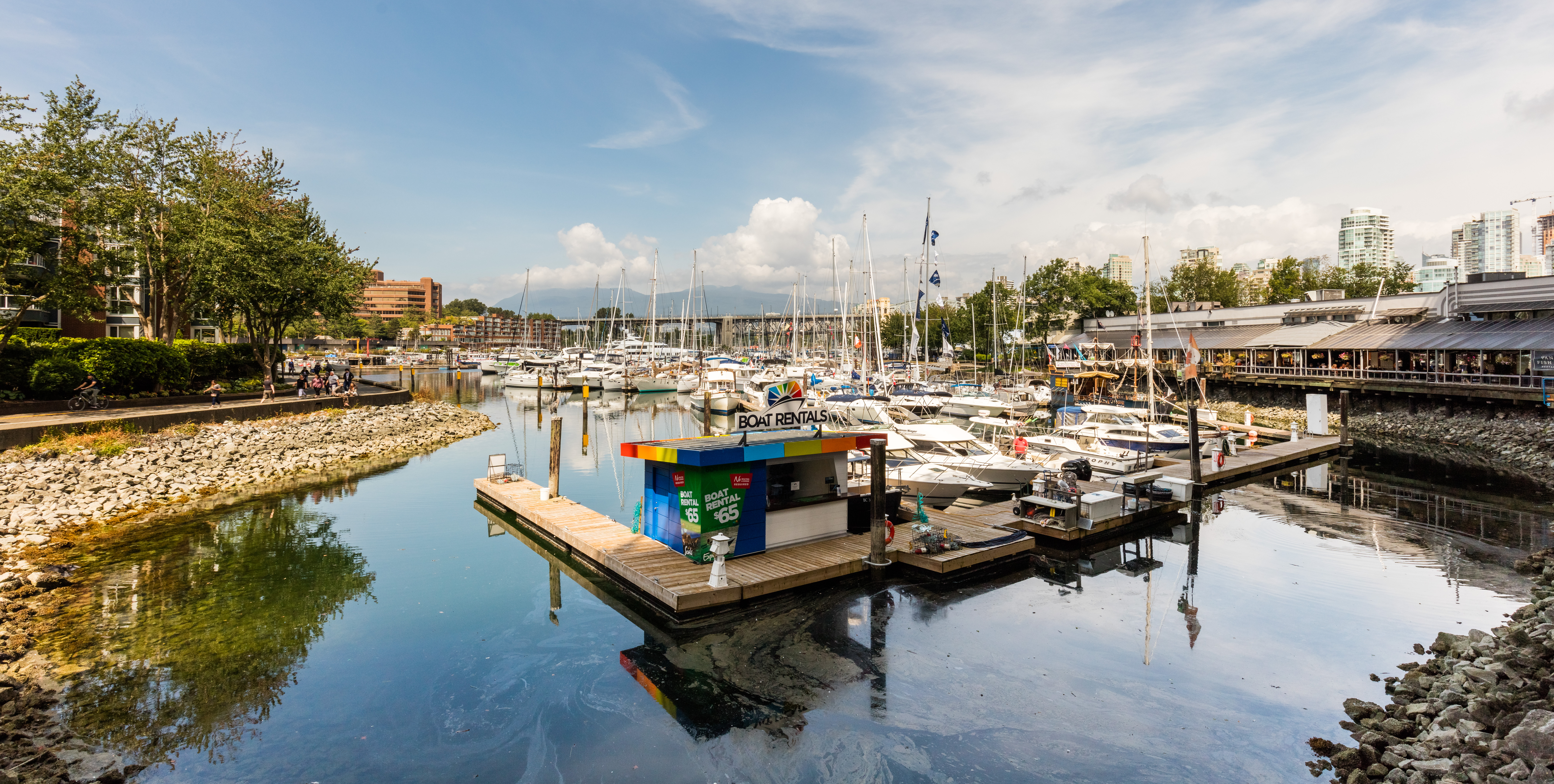
Granville harbour

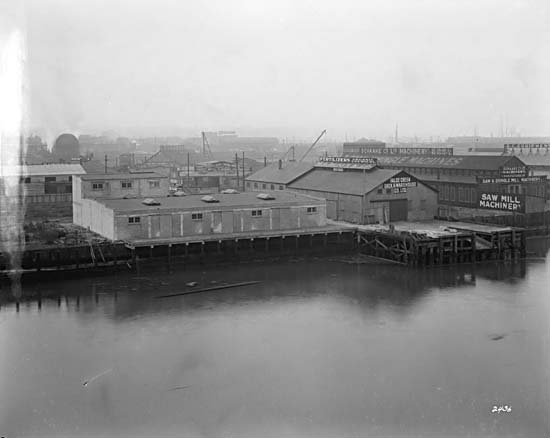
Northwest Granville Island in 1922. Many of the buildings shown here are still standing as of 2006.

== Notable residents ==
- Jim Coleman (1911–2001), Canadian sports journalist, writer and press secretary
