= Troll Ski Resort =

Ski resort in British Columbia, Canada

Coordinates: 53°04′00″N 121°57′00″W

Troll Ski Resort, often referred to simply as Troll, is a ski area located in the Quesnel Highland in the northeastern Cariboo region of British Columbia, Canada, located between Quesnel and the historic goldfield towns of Wells-Barkerville. The official name of the locality where Troll is located is Pinegrove, British Columbia, which is located between Coldspring House (SW) and Beaver Pass House (NE) on the Barkerville Highway).

Troll was built by Lars Fossberg in 1972, and fifty-three years later it is still run by the family. Troll has developed into a full-service ski mountain, with 4 surface lifts, 1,700 vertical feet of terrain, and accommodations.
