= Cottonwood River (Fraser River tributary) =

River in British Columbia, Canada

Coordinates: 53°07′00″N 122°36′00″W

Cottonwood River is a tributary of the Fraser River in the Central Interior of British Columbia, Canada. Rising at the confluence of the Swift River and Lightning Creek at Coldspring House in the Cariboo goldfields of the northern Cariboo Plateau, it flows northwest and then turns southwest to join the Fraser just north of the city of Quesnel, which is at the confluence of the Quesnel River with the Fraser.

It is the namesake of the settlement of Cottonwood, located 8 km northwest of its origin at the confluence of Lightning Creek and the Swift, and also of Cottonwood House, a heritage property adjoining the settlement, which is situated along the highway from Quesnel to Wells and the museum town and former "capital" of the Cariboo Gold Rush, Barkerville. Cottonwood House was a road house on the last leg of the Cariboo Wagon Road, which ran from Yale north to Quesnel and then turned east to reach Barkerville and is now a historic park and small museum. Also named for the river is the Cottonwood Canyon, which lies along the Fraser to the north of the Cottonwood's confluence.

Cottonwood River Provincial Park is situated to the northeast of the confluence of the Quesnel and Cottonwood Rivers.

== See also ==
- List of rivers of British Columbia
