= Beaver Pass (Cariboo) =

Mountain pass in British Columbia, Canada

- Location within British Columbia
- Elevation: 1,070 metres (3,510 ft)

Third Approach
- Location: British Columbia, Canada
- Range: Cariboo Plateau
- Coordinates: 53°06′59″N 121°54′04″W
- Topo map: NTS 93H4 Wells

Beaver Pass, elev. 1070 m (3510 ft), is a pass in the hillcountry of the northern Cariboo Plateau forming a divide between Lightning Creek (S) and Tregillus Creek, part of the Willow River drainage (N), located just northwest of Beaver Pass House, a locality along the route of BC Highway 26, which leads to Barkerville and Wells from its start at its junction with the Cariboo Highway (97) at the city of Quesnel.
