= Pinegrove, British Columbia =

Unincorporated locality in British Columbia

Pinegrove
- Location of Pinegrove in British Columbia
- Coordinates: 53°04′00″N 121°57′00″W
- Country: Canada
- Province: British Columbia
- Time zone: UTC−07:00 (PT)
- Area codes: 250, 778

Pinegrove is an unincorporated locality on BC Highway 26 in the Cariboo Country of the Central Interior of British Columbia, located between Coldspring House (SW) and Beaver Pass House (NE), southwest of Four Mile Lake. It is the location of the Troll Ski Resort.

== See also ==
- Wells, British Columbia
- Barkerville, British Columbia
