= Williams Creek (British Columbia) =

Coordinates: 53°05′00″N 121°34′00″W

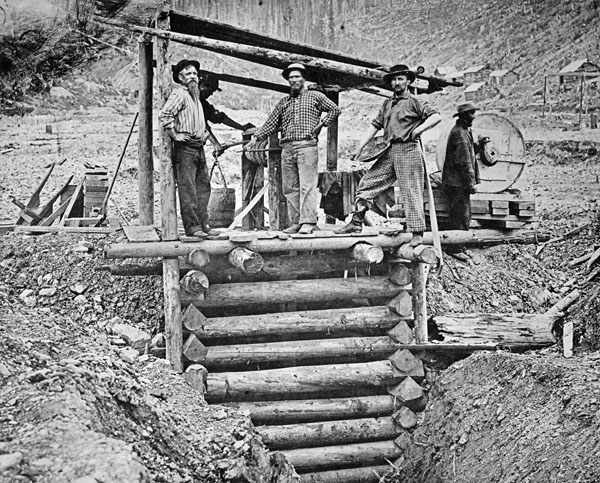
The Sheephead Claim on Williams Creek, 1868.

Williams Creek is an important historical gold mining creek in the Cariboo goldfields of the Central Interior of British Columbia, entering the Willow River between Barkerville and the town of Wells, which is at the headwaters of the Willow River.

Williams Creek is named for Wilhelm Dietz, a Prussian sailor who was one of a party that set out from Lightning Creek and was the first to discover gold on this creek, which was quickly staked by his companions and soon after by others. Williams Creek became the most important and richest digging in the Cariboo goldfields, giving birth to the towns of Richfield, Barkerville and Camerontown, which collectively were also known as Williams Creek. Barkerville and Camerontown were named for two of Dietz's companions, Billy Barker and John Cameron, Barker being the most famous and at times the richest of the Cariboo gold miners. Dietz's claim was not a money-maker and he died in poverty.

== Brief history of Williams Creek diggings ==
The Cariboo gold camp has a storied history as a goldfield dating back to the late 1850s. It is estimated that placer gold in excess of 2 million ounces was captured in the area during the 19th Century. Total value of gold to date reported by 1877 for all claims on Williams Creek was $19,320,000.

=== Hard rock explorations ===
In the early 1860s when placer gold production peaked, the search began for lode gold deposits. The Black Jack (Lot 1.B), Home Stake (Lot 4.B), Cornish (Lot 1.F) and the Wintrip (Lot 32.F) were among the first claims to be staked in the area.

During the period 1877–1892, prospecting and testing was done on the major veins: Bonanza (B.C.) Vein, Steadman Vein, Pinkerton Vein, Black Jack Vein (Westport), Proserpine Vein, Perkins Vein and Mount Burns Vein. In 1877–1892, Black Jack and Burns Co. sank a shaft (180 feet) on the Black Jack claim from which three levels were established with a few hundred feet of drifts and crosscuts. Assays greater than $70 per ton were reported.

The larger Cariboo area was home to a number of producing gold mines during the 20th Century.
