= Fanny Bendixen =

Canadian businesswoman

Fanny Bendixen (c. 1820 — May 2, 1899) was a Canadian hotelier and saloonkeeper during the gold rush period in British Columbia.

Bendixen was an important figure in the service industry surrounding the Cariboo gold rush. Her hotels at Barkerville, Lightning Creek and Stanley were examples of her skills in the business world and her pioneering of opportunities for frontier women.
