= Cottonwood Canyon =

Cottonwood Canyon may refer to:

== United States ==
=== Arizona ===
- Cottonwood Canyon, Arizona, near Sedona

=== California ===
- Cottonwood Canyon (Alpine County), a valley in Alpine County, California
- Cottonwood Canyon (Inyo County), a valley in Inyo County, California
- Cottonwood Canyon (Joshua Tree National Park), a valley in Riverside County, California
- Cottonwood Canyon (Kern County), a valley in Kern County, California
- Cottonwood Canyon (Lassen County), a valley in Lassen County, California
- Cottonwood Canyon (White Mountains), a valley in Mono County, California
- Cottonwood Canyon (Mono Lake), a valley in Mono County, California
- Cottonwood Canyon (California-Nevada), a valley in Mono County, California and Lyon County, Nevada
- Cottonwood Canyon (Santa Barbara County), a valley in Santa Barbara County, California
- Cottonwood Canyon (Mid Hills), a valley in San Bernardino County, California
- Cottonwood Canyon (Little Tujunga Wash), a valley in Los Angeles County, California
- Cottonwood Canyon (Santa Catalina Island), a valley in Los Angeles County, California
- Cottonwood Canyon (San Jacinto River), a valley in the Temescal Mountains, Riverside County, California
- Cottonwood Canyon (Bautista Canyon), a valley in the San Jacinto Mountains, Riverside County, California
- Cottonwood Canyon (Whitewater River), a valley in Riverside County, California
- Cottonwood Canyon (Yolo County), a valley in Yolo County, California
- Cottonwood Canyon (Mason Valley), in Mason Valley, San Diego County, California

=== Nebraska ===
- Cottonwood Canyon, Nebraska, near Maxwell

=== Oregon ===
- Cottonwood Canyon State Park, Oregon

=== Utah ===
- Little Cottonwood Canyon, Utah, near Salt Lake City
- Big Cottonwood Canyon, Utah, near Salt Lake City
- Cottonwood Canyon (Kane County, Utah), in the southern part of the state, traversed by Road 400

== Canada ==
- Cottonwood Canyon (British Columbia), on the Skeena River, near Cedarvale, British Columbia
- Cottonwood Canyon (Fraser River), on the Fraser River, near Quesnel, British Columbia
