= Beaver Pass House =

- Location of Beaver Pass House in British Columbia
- Coordinates: 53°04′25″N 121°51′20″W
- Country: Canada
- Province: British Columbia
- Area codes: 250, 778

Beaver Pass House is an unincorporated locality and former roadhouse on the Cariboo Wagon Road (now the Barkerville Highway) in the Cariboo Country of the Central Interior of British Columbia, Canada. Located on the north bank of Lightning Creek northwest of Coldspring House, another roadhouse, it still had a population of 17 in the 1961 Canadian census, in which it had been listed as Beaver Pass (the pass proper is just to its north). By that time, the original roadhouse had been destroyed by a fire, but a gas station and coffeehouse had been built near the original location.

Between Beaver Pass House and Coldspring House are the localities of Wingdam and Pinegrove. Pinegrove is the location of the Troll Ski Resort, a small operation popular with skiers from Quesnel.

== See also ==
- Cottonwood, British Columbia
