= Stanley, British Columbia =

Stanley, British Columbia.
- Ghost town
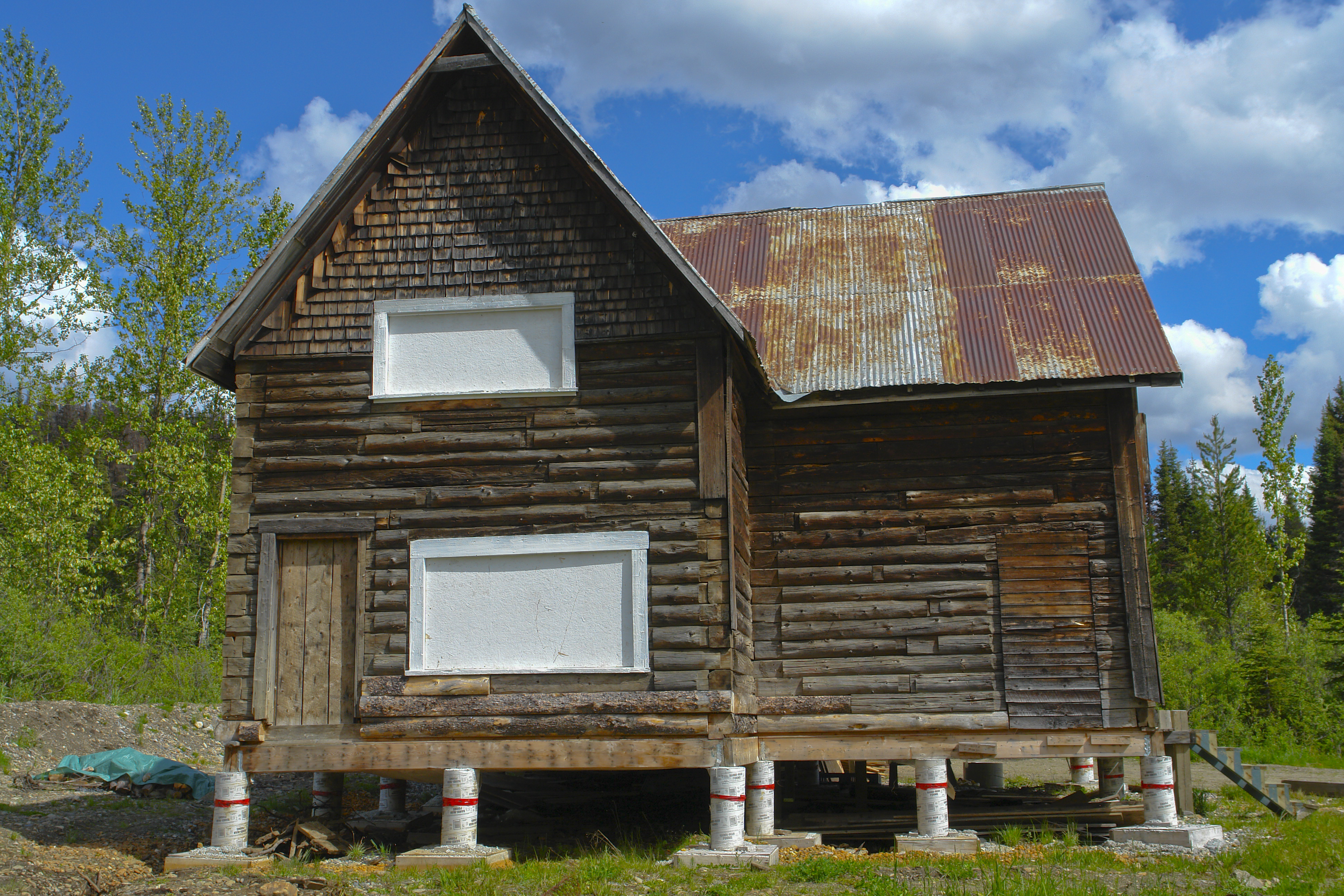
- Last standing building in Stanley (June 23, 2007)

- Location within British Columbia
- Coordinates: 53°2′22.42″N 121°43′35.26″W
- Country: Canada
- Province: British Columbia
- Founded: 1861
- Elevation: 1,200 m (3,900 ft)

Population (2014)
  - Total: 0
- Time zone: PST
- Highways: Highway 26
- Standing buildings: 1 (as of March 2014)

Stanley was a gold rush town in the Cariboo region of British Columbia that began during the Cariboo Gold Rush.

== History ==
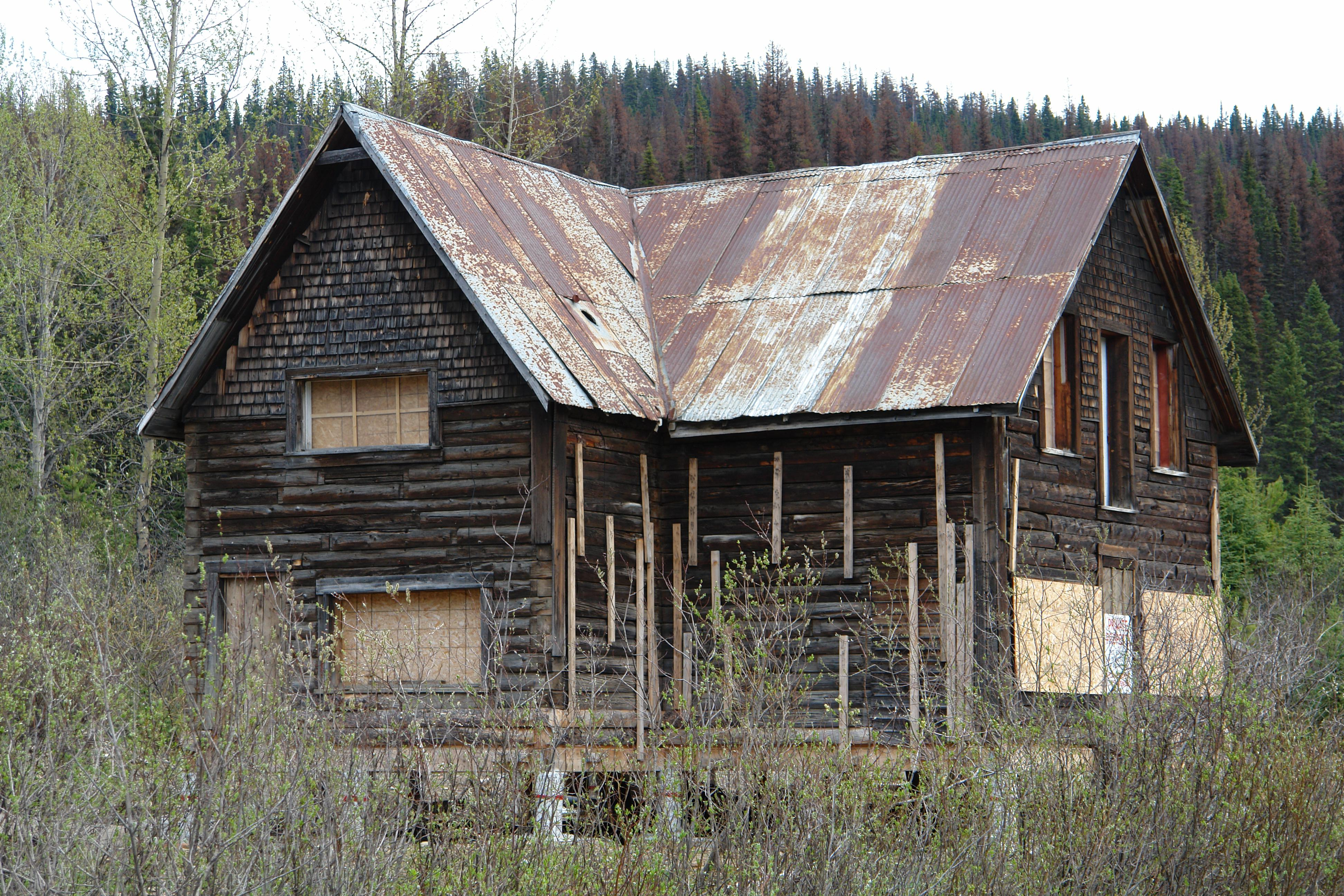
Last standing building in Stanley

Gold was found in nearby Lightning Creek in 1861 resulting in the towns of Stanley and Van Winkle springing up as part of the Cariboo Gold Rush. Stanley is located in the Cariboo region of British Columbia’s central interior. Stanley can be found by following Highway 26 east from the city of Quesnel. A 45-minute drive along Highway 26 passes by the appropriately named Stanley Road on which the town of Stanley was located.

Stanley once had a sprawling population that surpassed the town of Barkerville at one time due to the gold in the area. Passing by the vicinity one would not even know that there was ever a bristling town full of gold-hungry prospectors and their families. A lone building that is now being renovated is the little visible evidence from the gravel road that there was anything ever there. But just a few steps into the now thick underbrush reveals plenty of evidence of the town of Stanley. An abundance of scrap wood, metal and remnants of buildings can be seen buried in the brush and earth. By the end of the 19th century (1800s), Stanley had a population that surpassed the nearby town of Barkerville; Over half the population of Stanley consisted of Chinese.

=== Last Standing Building in Stanley, The Lightning Hotel ===
Because of its longevity, much has been written about the Lightning Hotel from its arrival at its current site in 1873. It was originally brought down from the town of Richfield during a great fire that destroyed most of the town. The building was saved by a bucket brigade. Then moved on skids from Richfield to its present location. The first proprietor, William Houseman, locally nicknamed The Duke of York, renamed his Yorkville Saloon to The Lightning Hotel.

The hotel had many owners from William Ellis, John Lowe, William Morgan and Len Ford. Also super chef and confectioner Hannah Williams owned it until 1947 at the time of her death.

There is some speculation that the hotel burned down in 1924 and was rebuilt on its original site from buildings purchased by Jimmy Williams at the defunct La Fontaine Mine. During the early 1900s an additional wing (which was the mirror image of the original structure) was built doubling the size of the building. This addition had all the hallmarks of a building built in the 1920s lending to the further confusion of the date of the original building. The 1920s addition disappeared sometime between 1970 and 1990, leaving the current structure all that remains of the Lightning Hotel. The current construction bears all the 'trait's' of a building of the late 19th century. Hotels of the 1800s were no larger than the building currently standing. In addition, a building such as the one that stands today would never have been found in a mining camp.

It was purchased by prominent Vancouver mining executive Jack LaFleur and his wife Nita who opened it in 1967 for the centennial year. After that, the building was closed and slowly fell into disrepair with the second half of the building (built in the early 1900s) disappearing completely.

In 1996, Jack and Nita LaFleur's son, Mark LaFleur and his business partner Lawrence Adams took on the job of restoring the property by giving it a new foundation and securing it structurally. The work was done by Mr. Howard Berlin. The restoration process continues today.

== Stanley Cemetery ==
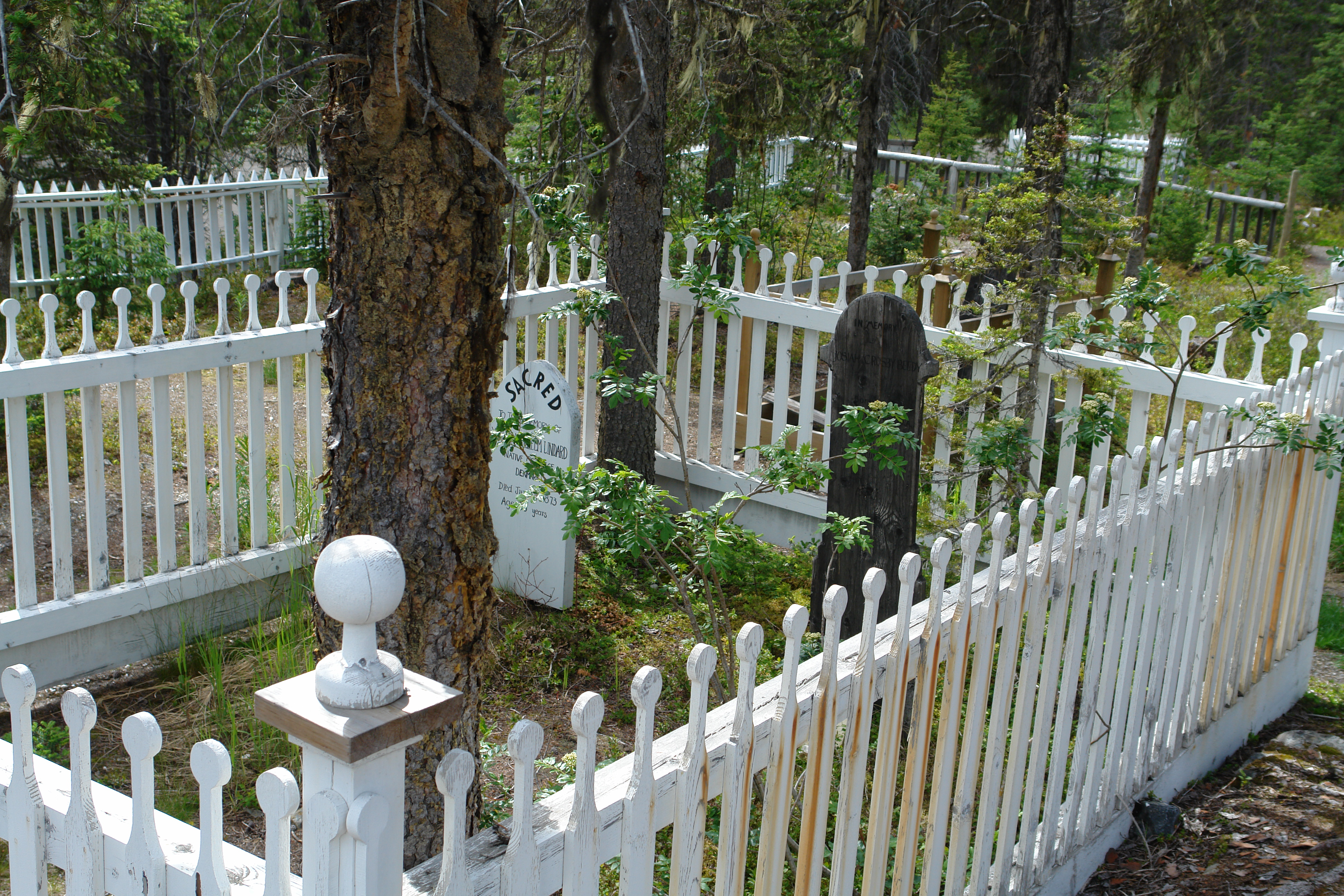
Stanley Cemetery

Overlooking the town of Stanley is the old Stanley Cemetery located atop a hill. The graveyard holds some pioneers of the gold rush area along with some later expired residents. At first glimpse, it seems as though grave robbers may have dug up some of the plots and took the bones but the graves belonged to Chinese gold miners whose remains were shipped back to their birthplace.

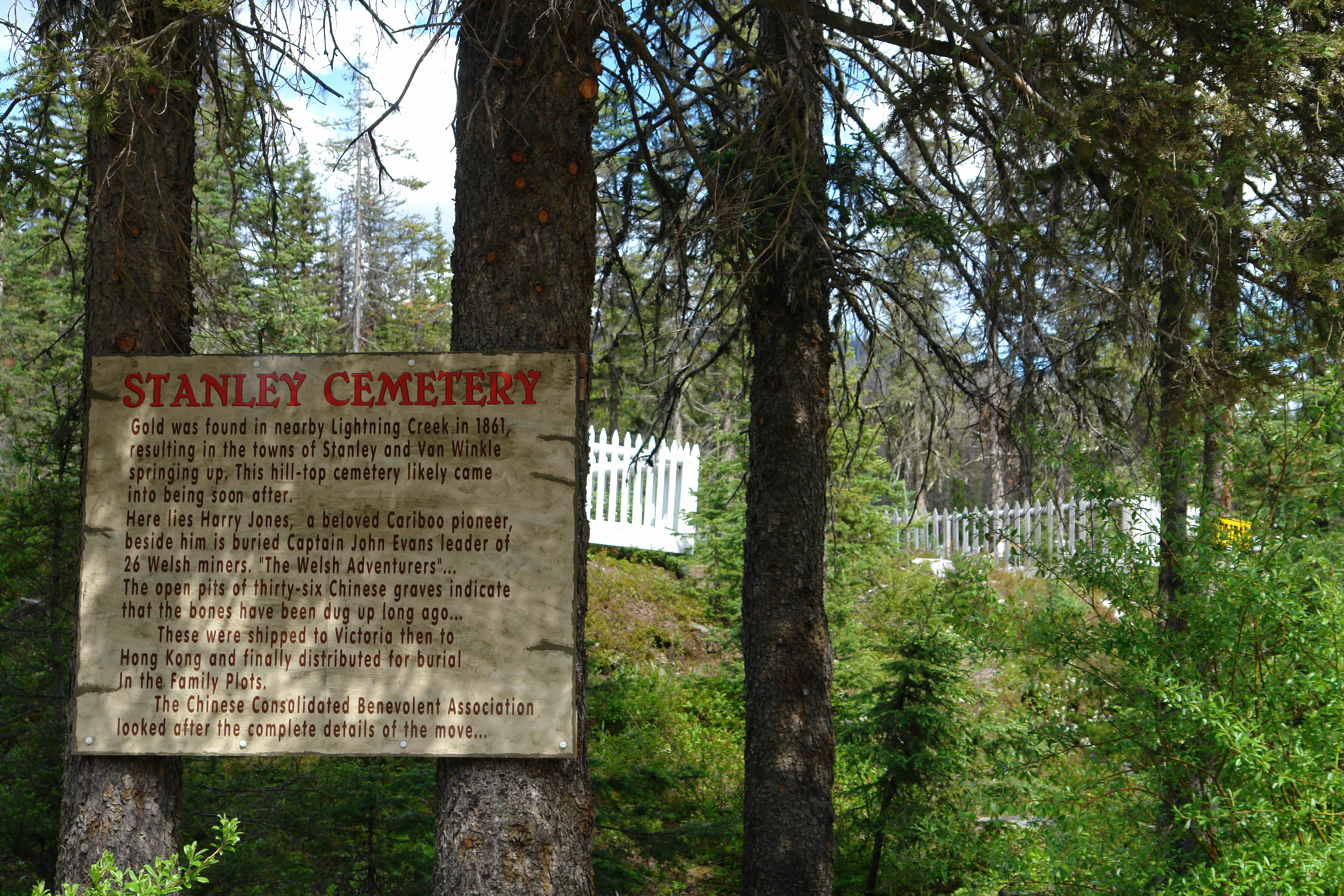
Stanley Cemetery

The old cemetery is gradually becoming a part of the land, as is the town of Stanley. The Stanley cemetery is maintained only by donations which shows in the deterioration.

=== Occupying the Stanley Cemetery ===
Daisy Gardner, Mearl Gardner and Mary Gardner's first baby daughter.

=== Mountain Pine Beetle and the Stanley Cemetery ===
The Cariboo region of British Columbia was ravaged by the Mountain Pine Beetle in which Stanley lies. In 2005, the beetle kill trees were harvested around the Stanley cemetery and area for the safety of the visitors and to reduce the threat of forest fire. In the process of logging the beetle kill trees, the fencing surrounding the Stanley cemetery and some of the individual burial plots where damaged by the fallen trees. The damaged fencing was not repaired afterwards. In 2007, some minor restoration work was done to the area fencing.

== Photo gallery ==
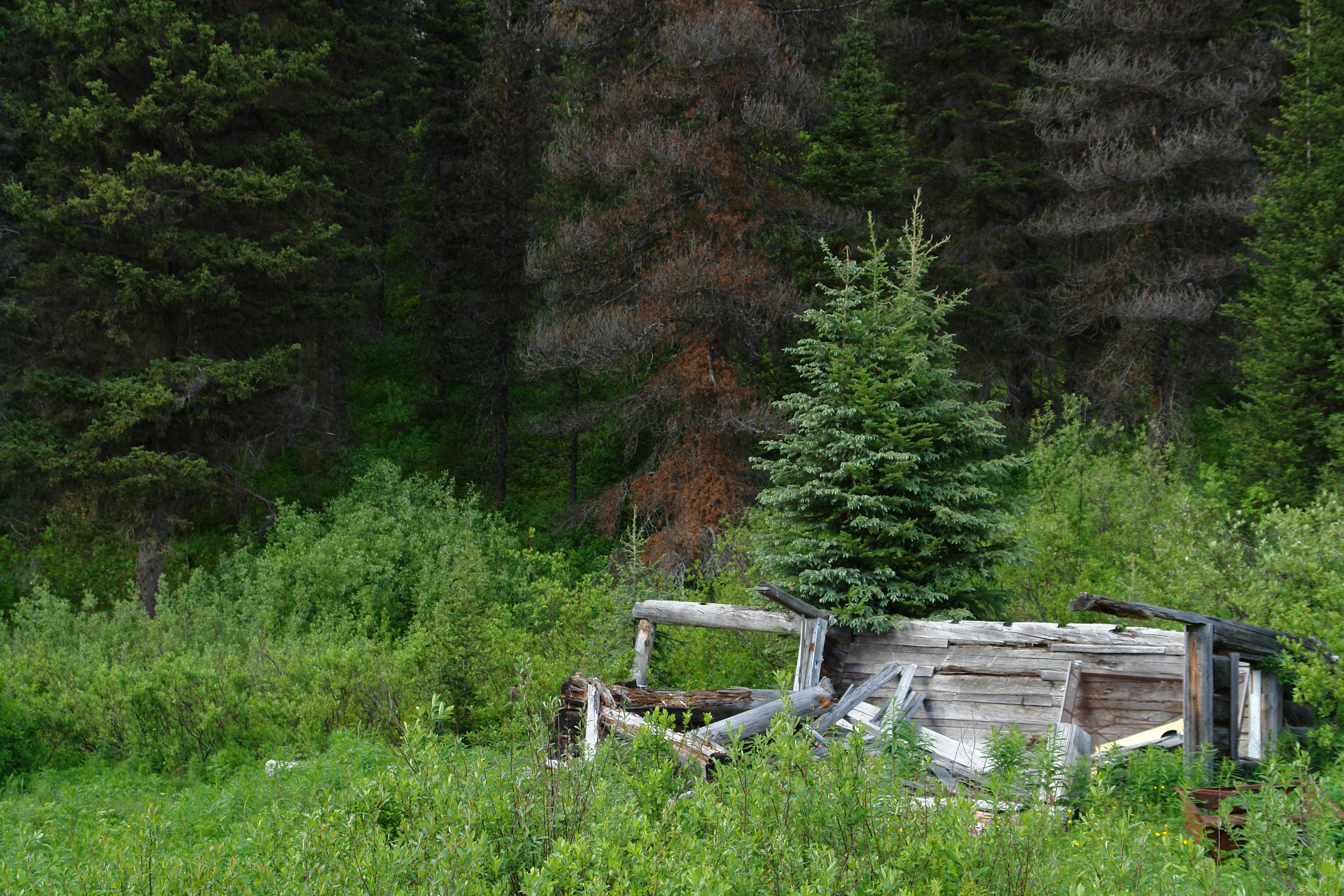
Stanley debris

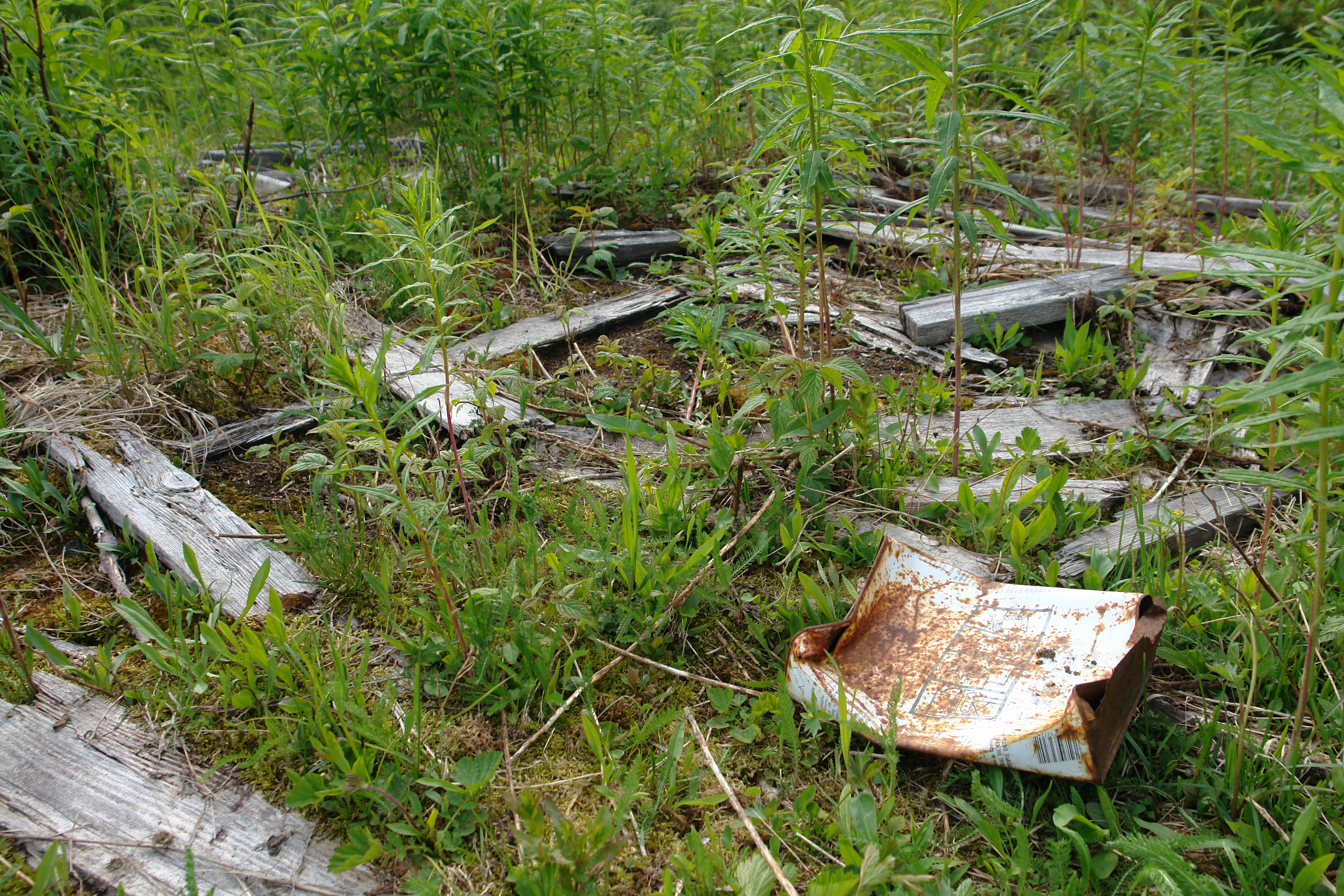
Tin can among the debris

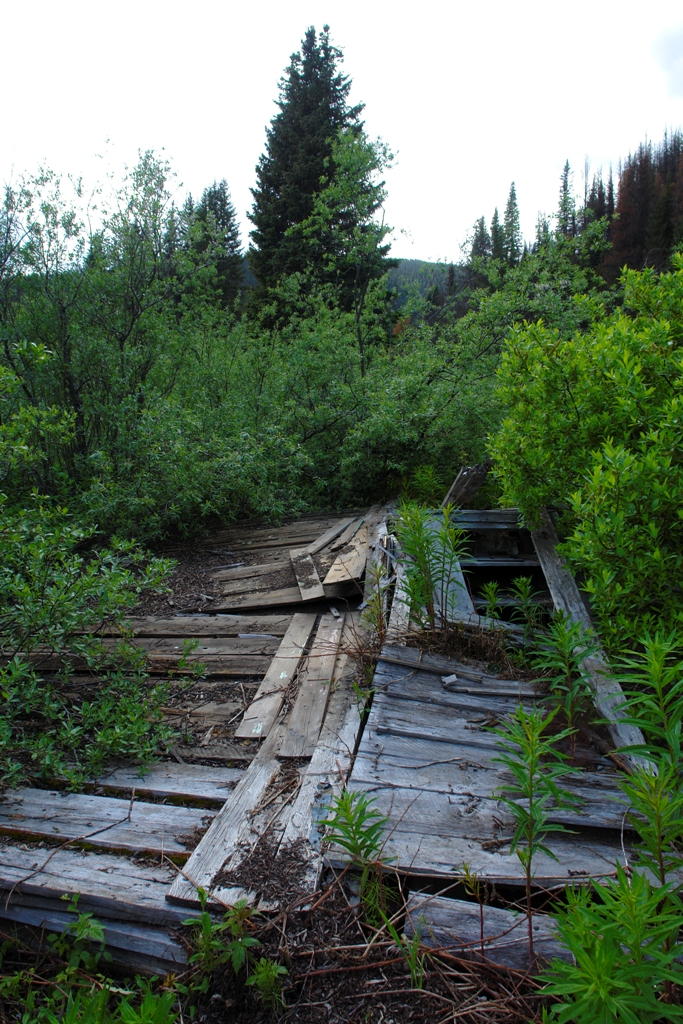
Stanley debris

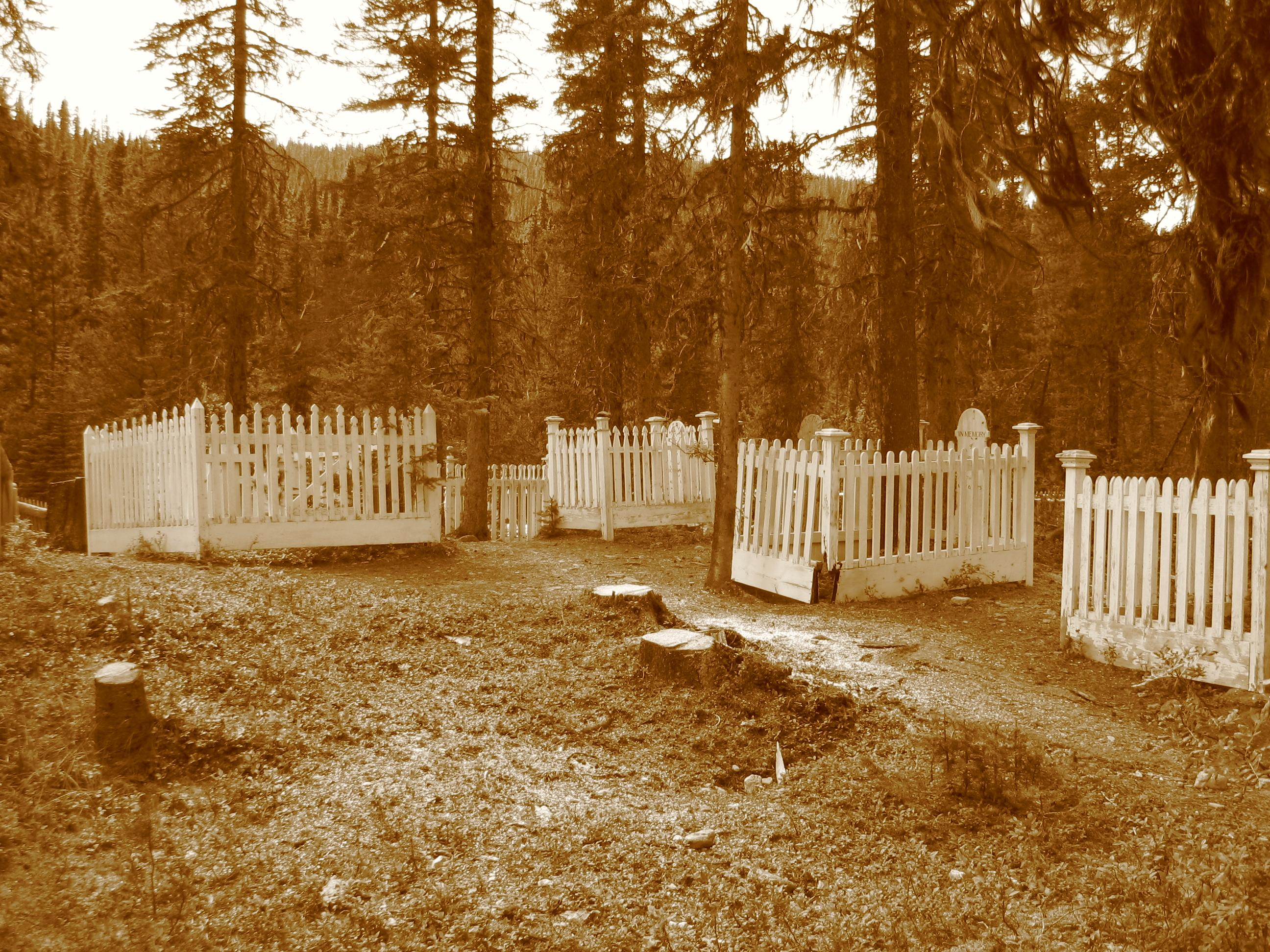
Stanley Cemetery

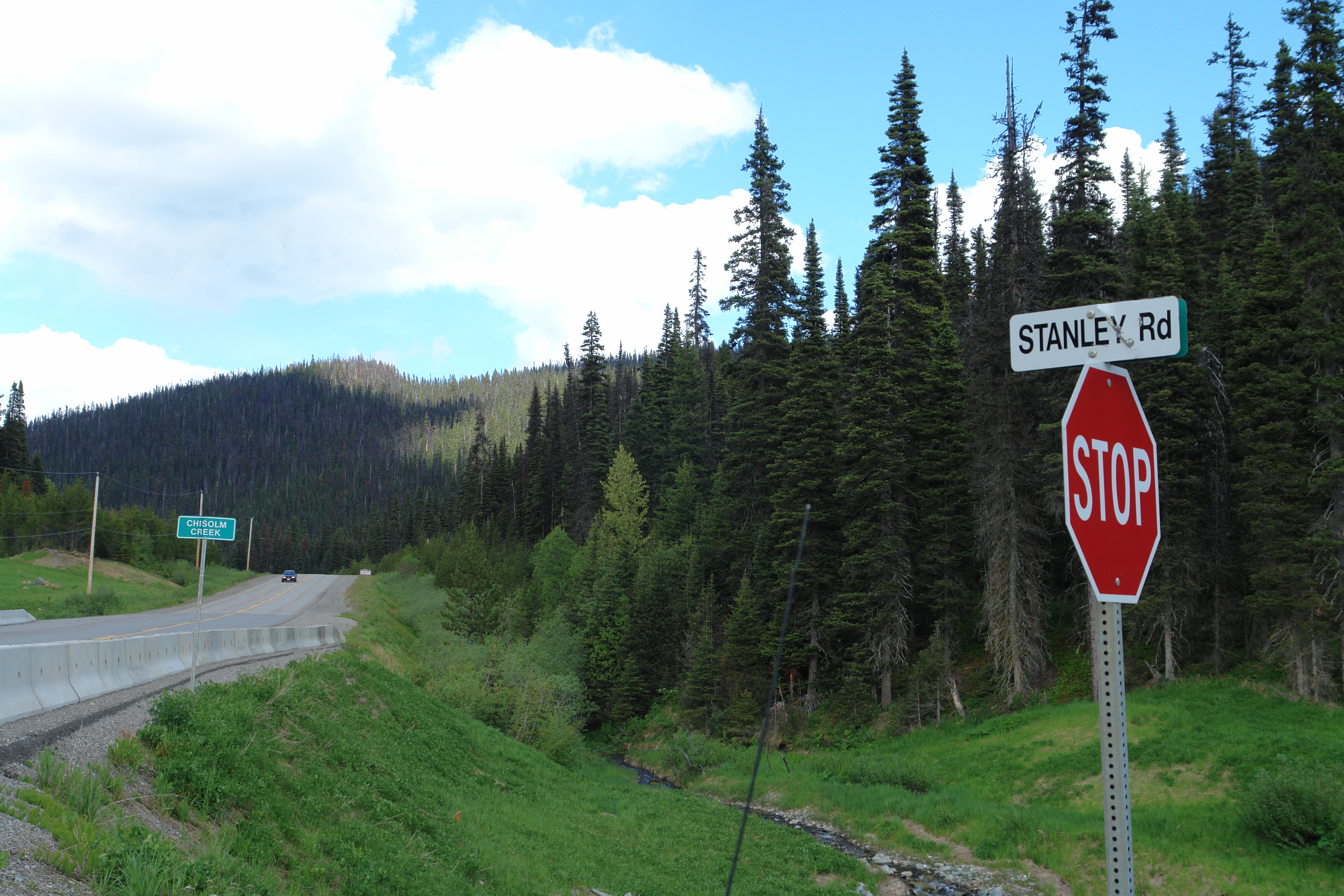
Road sign; all that indicates the vanished ghost town of Stanley on highway 26

== See also ==
- Fanny Bendixen
- Barkerville, British Columbia
