= St. Mary Lake (Vancouver Island) =

- Location within Vancouver Island
- Location: Vancouver Island, British Columbia
- Coordinates: 49°16′00″N 124°38′00″W
- Lake type: Natural lake
- Basin countries: Canada

St. Mary Lake is a lake located on Vancouver Island south of Cameron Lake.

== See also ==
- List of lakes of British Columbia
