= Matthew Baillie Begbie =

British-Canadian lawyer, politician and judge

Sir Matthew Baillie Begbie
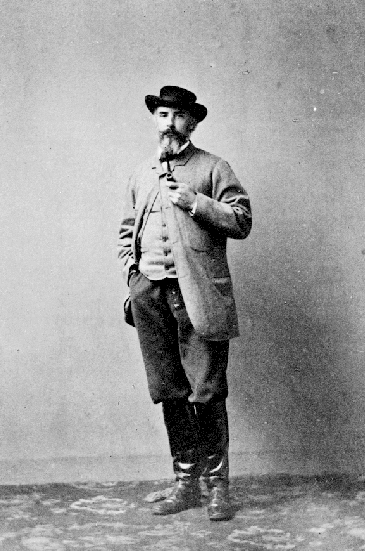
- Sir Matthew Baillie Begbie

Chief Justice of the Supreme Court of British Columbia
- In office 1871–1894
- Nominated by: John A. Macdonald
- Appointed by: The Lord Lisgar
- Preceded by: himself as Chief Justice of the Colony of BC
- Succeeded by: Theodore Davie

Chief Justice of the Colony of British Columbia
- In office 1869–1871
- Appointed by: James Douglas

Personal details
- Born: 9 May 1819 Mauritius
- Died: June 11, 1894 (aged 75) Victoria, British Columbia, Canada
- Education: University of Cambridge; Lincoln's Inn

Sir Matthew Baillie Begbie (9 May 1819 – 11 June 1894) was a British lawyer, politician, and judge. In 1858, Begbie became the first Chief Justice of the Crown Colony of British Columbia in colonial times and in the first decades after British Columbia joined Confederation as a province of Canada.

Begbie served as the first Judge of the Supreme Court, Colony of British Columbia 1858 to 1866 and then, in the same capacity in the Supreme Court, the united Colony of British Columbia from 1866 to 1870. He was Chief Justice of the Supreme Court of the United Colonies from 1870 to 1871 and then served as the first Chief Justice of the Supreme Court of the new Province of British Columbia from 1871 until his death on June 11, 1894.

In the years after his death, Begbie came to be known as the Hanging Judge.

== Early life and education ==
The son of an Army Colonel, Begbie was born on a British ship en route to the island of Mauritius, where he lived until he was seven, returning with his parents to Great Britain where he pursued his education. From the age of eleven to seventeen he was educated at Elizabeth College, Guernsey where he held the school number 328. His brother Thomas Stirling Begbie (329) attended the school at the same time. Begbie received his first degree from Peterhouse at the University of Cambridge, where he studied mathematics and the classics. He was involved in a great number of extracurricular activities, including singing and acting in amateur productions, dining societies, playing chess, rowing, and tennis. After Cambridge, Begbie went on to study law at Lincoln's Inn. He established a successful law practice in London before heading to British Columbia for a new position in government.

== Career ==
Begbie reached Fort Victoria on November 16, 1858, with a commission dated September 2, 1858 granting him "full power and authority to hold Courts of Judicature and to administer Justice, according to the laws now in force or which may hereafter be in force in Our said Colony." He was sworn into office in Fort Langley on November 19, by the Chief Justice of Vancouver Island David Cameron as the new Colony of British Columbia was proclaimed. Given the influx of prospectors and others during Fraser Canyon Gold Rush and the following Cariboo Gold Rush of 1861, Begbie played a crucial role in the establishment of law and order throughout the new colony.

Begbie was made a Knight Bachelor according to the London Gazette of November 19, 1875.

During his years on the bench, Begbie traveled throughout British Columbia, on foot and later on horseback administering justice in sometimes informal circumstances but he is said to have always worn his judicial robes and wig when court was in session.

During his early years, he played a role in government including drafting legislation such as the Aliens Act (1859), the Gold Fields Act (1859), and the Pre-emption Act (1860).

In 1860, Begbie found a white Californian man by the name of William Marshall guilty of assaulting a First Nations man based only on the testimony of First Nations people, the first time this had ever occurred. Begbie learned a number of Indigenous dialects and even conducted trials in those languages without the use of an interpreter. He had great friendships with a number of Chiefs and he was clearly sympathetic when it came to trying to impose colonial law on Indigenous people. He recognized the concept of Aboriginal marriage and allowed an oath for truth telling that recognized Aboriginal beliefs. He allowed people of other cultures to swear an oath of truth on an object sacred to them in place of the Bible.

In 1864, Begbie presided over the murder trial of five Tsilhqot'in men who were part of the Chilcotin War. The five were found guilty by juries and sentenced to hang. Begbie did not pass judgment himself but he did pronounce the mandatory sentence as the law required him to do. In 2014, the British Columbia government exonerated the Chilcotin leaders. Premier Christy Clark stated, "We confirm without reservation that these six Tsilhqot'in chiefs are fully exonerated for any crime or wrongdoing."

He was also an active naturalist. He was known to record observations during his travel, including drawing maps and bridge construction drawings. He sang opera. Begbie was implicated in land dealings at Cottonwood, between Quesnel and Barkerville, but denied any wrongdoing in what became known as the Cottonwood Scandal.

Begbie continued his judicial duties well into his last illness, dying in Victoria, British Columbia on June 11, 1894. The funeral procession marking his death is said to have been unprecedented and intended to mark the passing of a man regarded as British Columbia's first citizen. Begbie was interred at Ross Bay Cemetery in Victoria, British Columbia.

=== The Hanging Judge ===
"The Hanging Judge" is a term that has been referred to Begbie, though never in his lifetime.

== Legacy ==
Begbie ruled in 1886 that a law imposing very high licence fees discriminated against Chinese people even though it did not mention them, because laundries at the time were overwhelmingly run by Chinese. Another ruling with a similar logic two years later compelled the city of Victoria to renew the licences of Chinese pawnbrokers.

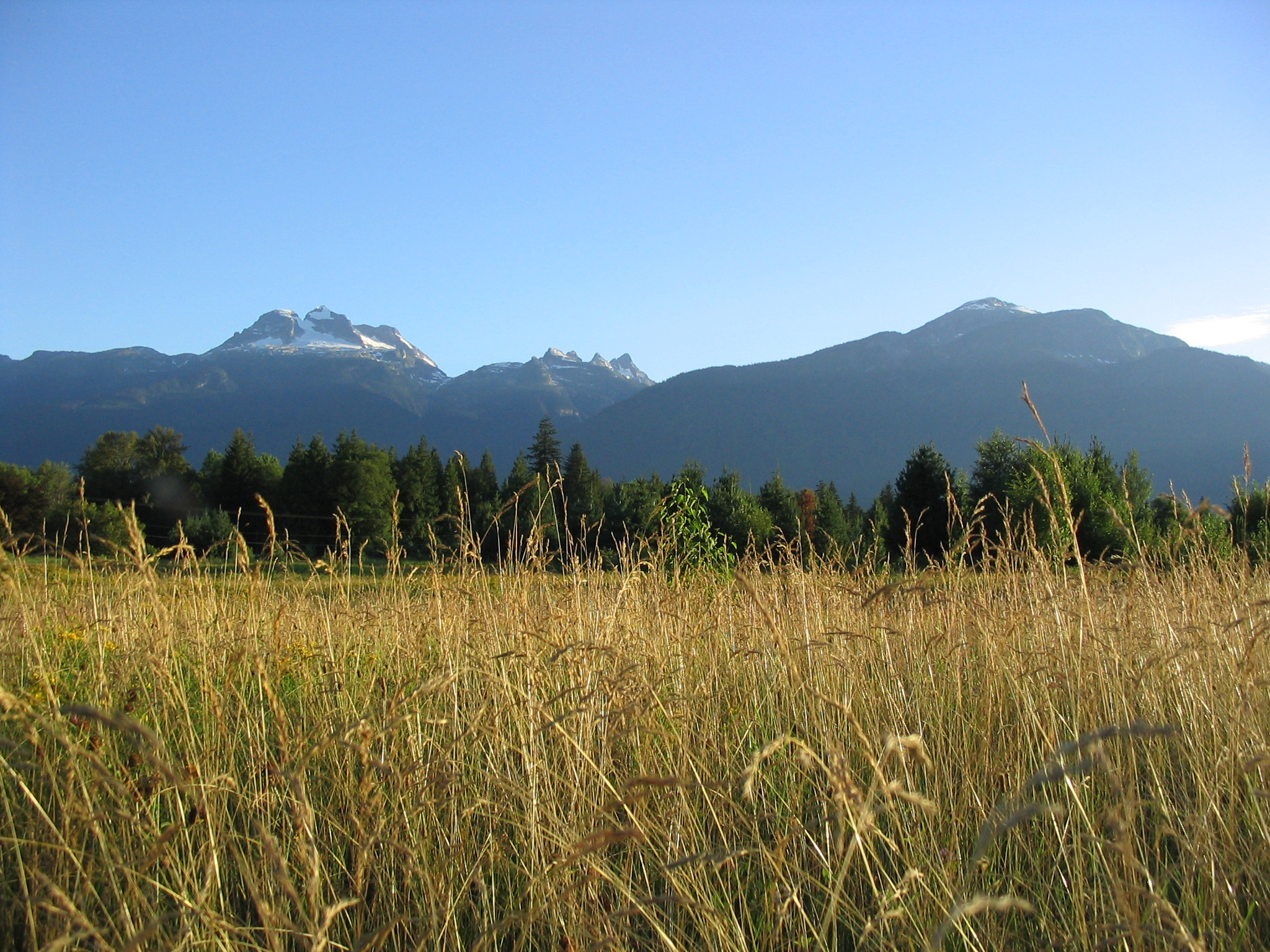
Mt. Begbie (left)

A Vancouver school, Sir Matthew Begbie Elementary School, was also named in his honour. This was changed to wek̓ʷan̓əs tə syaqʷəm elementary school in 2022.

Mount Begbie, the most prominent mountain seen from Revelstoke, was named in his honor. There are two other Mount Begbies in British Columbia; they are little more than hills although the one in the marshlands south of 100 Mile House has also given its name to the Begbie Summit, the highest point on the Cariboo Highway. There are also two lakes and a creek named for Judge Begbie.

The statues of Judge Begbie in the foyer of the Law Society of British Columbia and outside the Law Courts at New Westminster, British Columbia, were removed in 2017 and 2019.

(The family name Begbie originates in south-east Scotland, where it is most common in the Edinburgh and East Lothian areas).

== Image gallery ==
Sir Matthew Baillie Begbie, Chief Justice of British Columbia

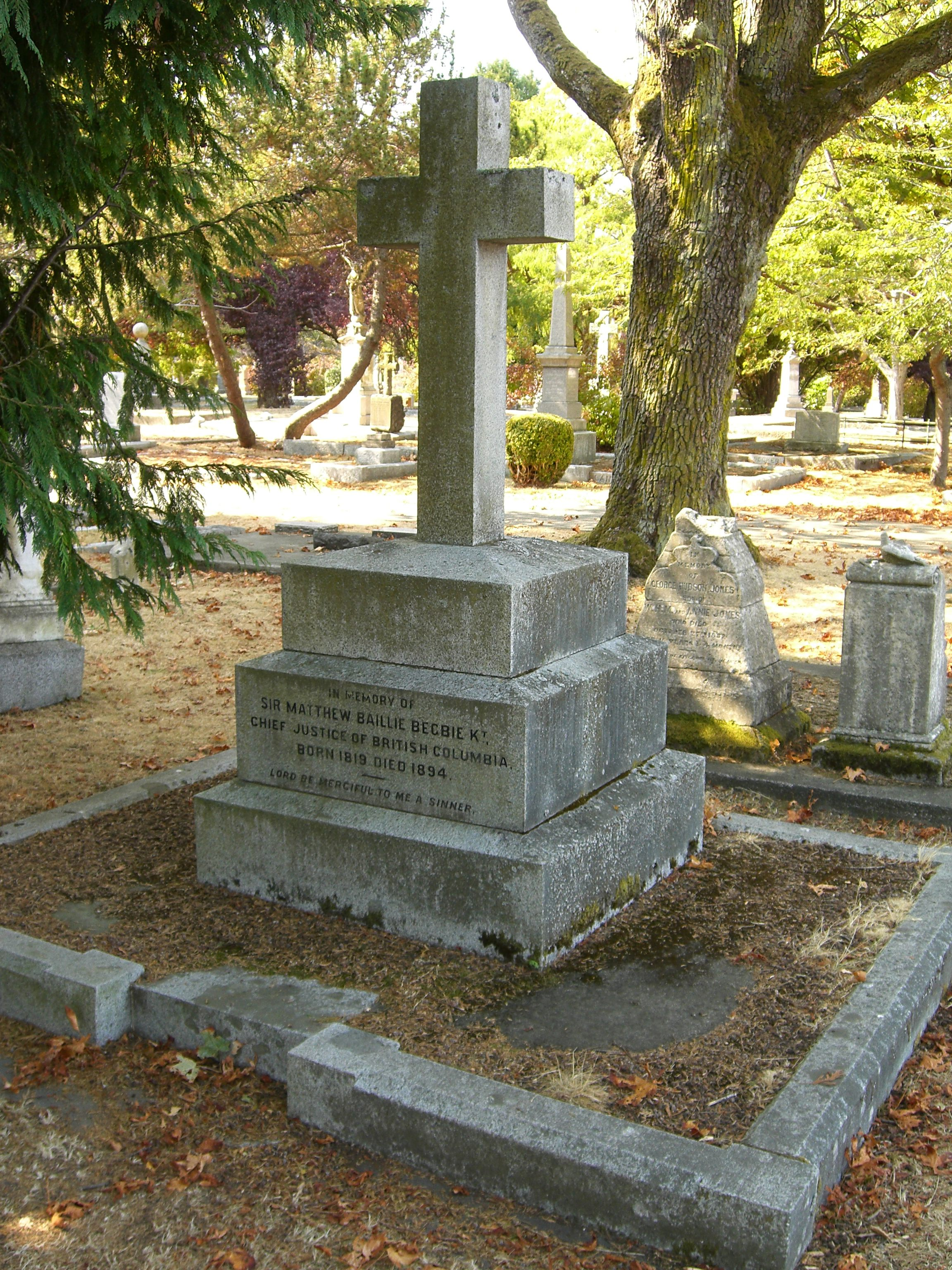
Tombstone at Ross Bay Cemetery

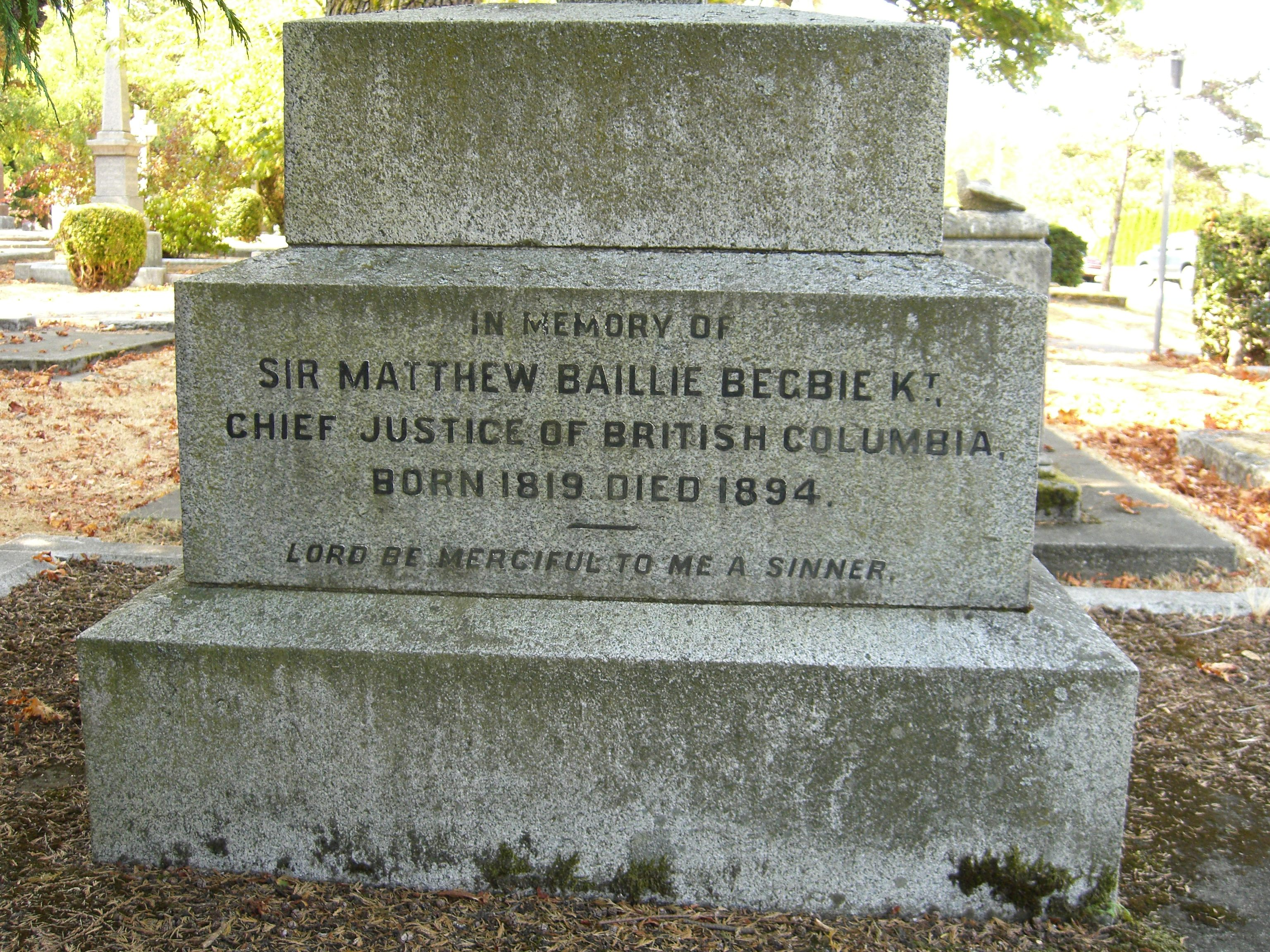
Epitaph

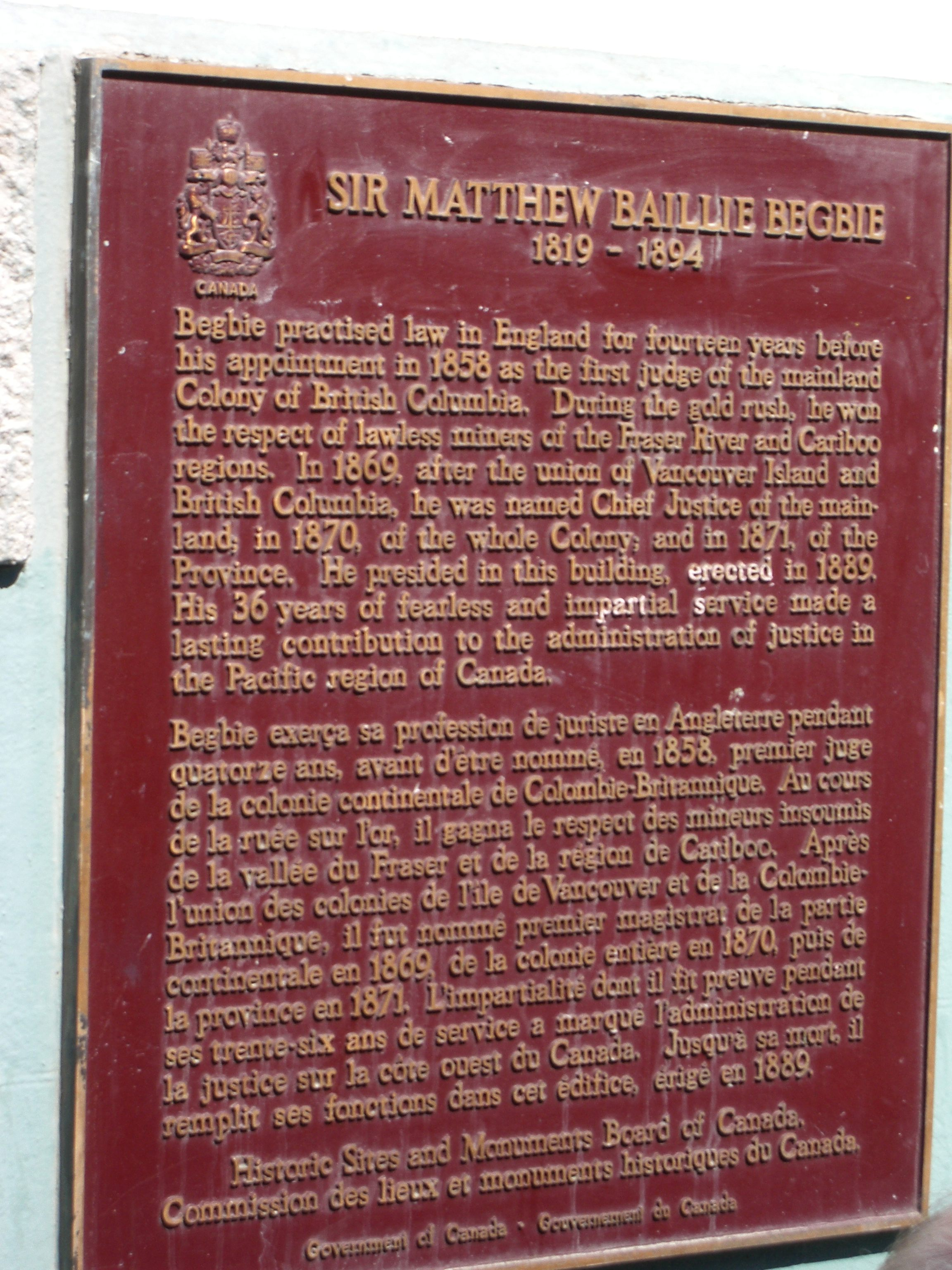
Historical Marker at Bastion Square

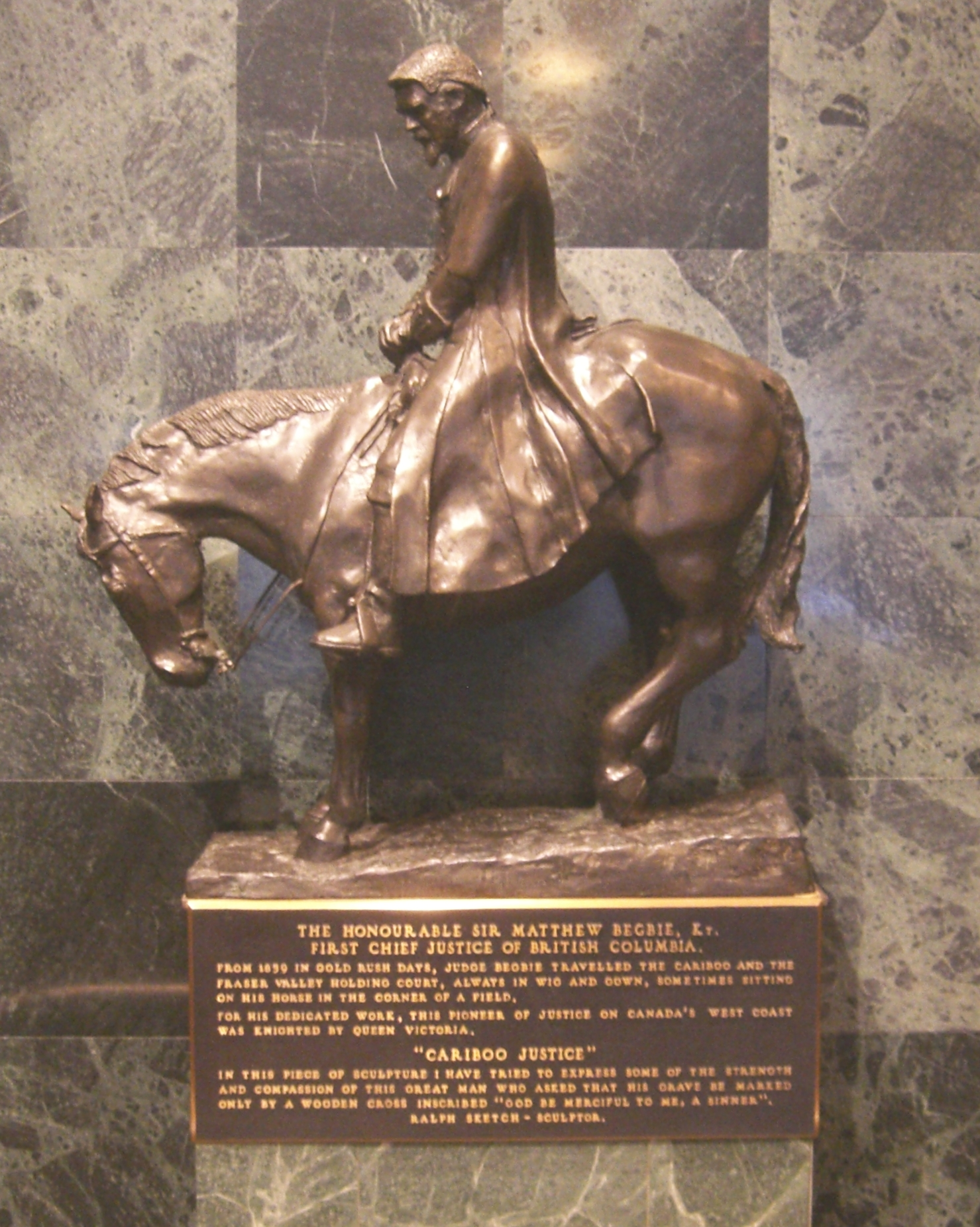
Statue formerly displayed at the Law Society of British Columbia Building, Hornby Street, Vancouver BC, by Ralph Sketch.

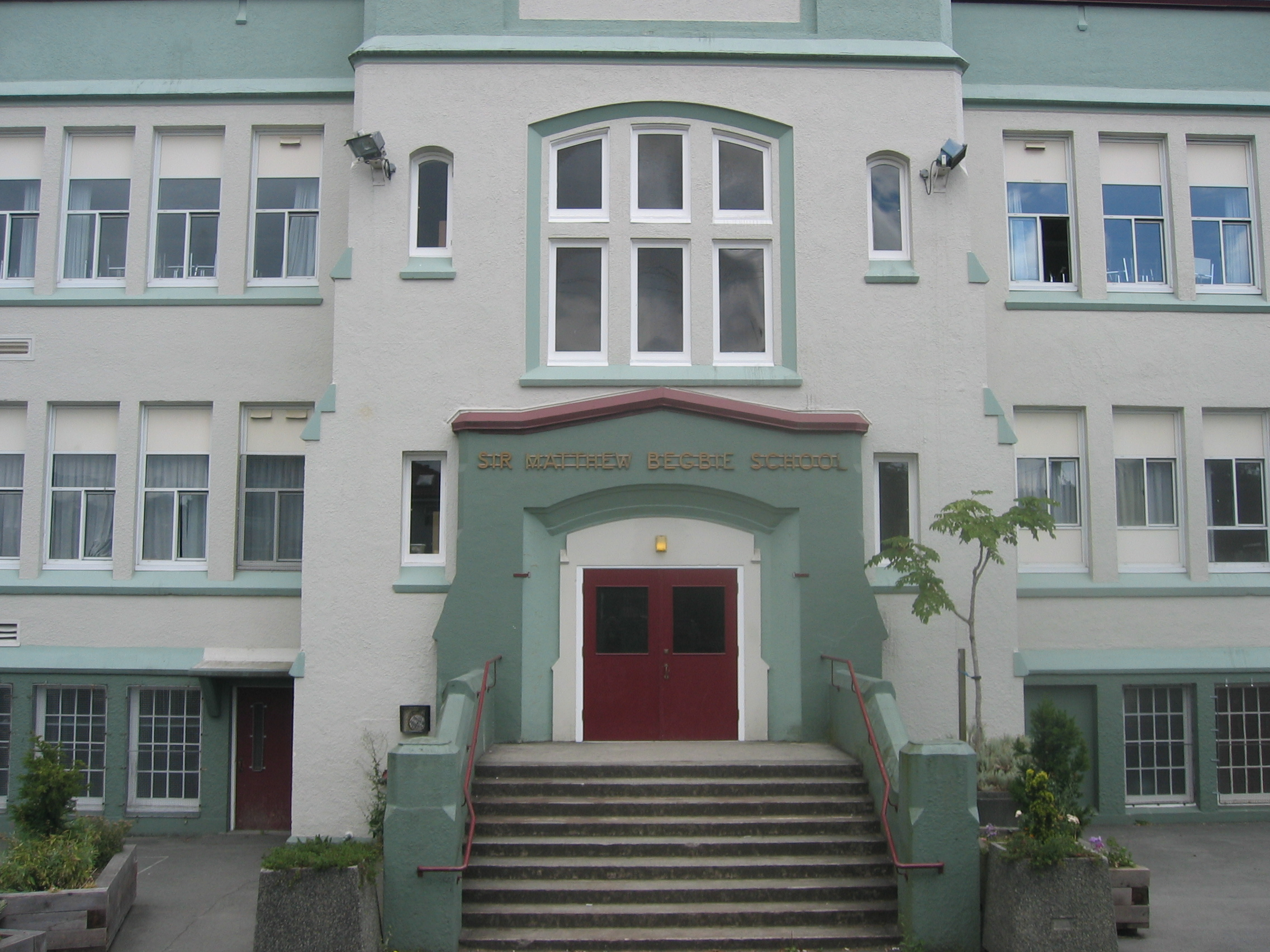
Sir Matthew Begbie Elementary School, Vancouver, British Columbia, Canada

== See also ==
- Chief Justice of Vancouver Island David Cameron
