= Cottonwood River Provincial Park =

Park in British Columbia, Canada

- IUCN category II (national park)
- Location within British Columbia
- Interactive map of Cottonwood River Provincial Park
- Location: Cariboo Land District, British Columbia, Canada
- Nearest city: Quesnel, BC
- Coordinates: 53°10′17″N 122°29′19″W
- Area: 66 ha (160 acres)
- Established: June 29, 2000
- Governing body: BC Parks

Cottonwood River Provincial Park is a provincial park in British Columbia, Canada, located northeast of the confluence of the Fraser and Cottonwood Rivers in that province's North Cariboo region.

There are no active recreational facilities, no maintenance, and camping is prohibited at this park.

== See also ==
- Cottonwood Canyon
- Cottonwood, British Columbia
- Cottonwood House Historic Park
- List of British Columbia provincial parks
