= Cottonwood Canyon (Fraser River) =

Canyon in British Columbia, Canada

Coordinates: 53°08′00″N 122°39′00″W

Cottonwood Canyon is a canyon along the Fraser River in the North Cariboo region of the Central Interior of British Columbia, Canada. It is located west of the Cariboo Mountains on the Fraser River south of its confluence with the east-flowing West Road River and north of its confluence with the northwest-flowing Cottonwood River just northwest of the city of Quesnel, The first European explorer was Simon Fraser (explorer) who ran the rapids on the first of June, 1808. One of his canoes became stranded and had to be pulled out of the canyon with a rope. It was one of the obstacles for gold rush-era steamboats operating on the Fraser from Quesnel to Fort George and up the Nechako and Stuart Rivers to Stuart Lake.

== See also ==
- Cottonwood, British Columbia
- Fort George Canyon
- Soda Creek Canyon
- Fraser Canyon
- Cottonwood River Provincial Park
