= Richfield, British Columbia =

Coordinates: 53.053°N 121.521°W

Richfield is a ghost town located in the Cariboo region of British Columbia, Canada. The town is situated beside Williams Creek. In 1891, the subdistrict of Richfield had a population of 316.
