= David Cameron (jurist) =

Merchant operating in the British Empire (1804–1872)

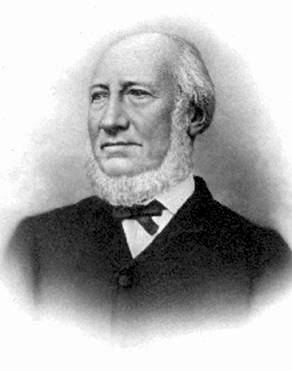
- The Honourable David Cameron
- Born: 1804; Perthshire, Scotland
- Died: May 9, 1872 (aged 68); Esquimalt, British Columbia, Canada
- Known for: First Chief Justice, Colony of Vancouver Island

David Cameron (1804 – 14 May 1872) was a jurist, merchant, and manager operating across the British Empire. He was unsuccessful as a cloth merchant in Scotland and as a sugar plantation manager in Demerara, Guianas. He became a Hudson's Bay Company clerk in Nanaimo, British Columbia and then a judge in the Colony of Vancouver Island. In 1853, Cameron became the first Chief Justice of Vancouver Island, a position which he held until 1858. He served as a justice until his retirement in 1865.

== Judicial career ==
In the years when the Hudson's Bay Company continued to have exclusive licence to trade in what is now British Columbia, Governor James Douglas had appointed four magistrates to deal with legal disputes but he found them to be "ignorant and unreliable". As Douglas was functioning as sheriff and judge in addition to his other responsibilities, he recognized the need to establish a court and appoint a judge. His wife's brother, an HBC employee arrived from Demerara in July 1853 to take up duties as a clerk in the company operations in Nanaimo, British Columbia. Cameron had no legal training. Douglas appointed Cameron a Judge of the newly created Supreme Court of Civil Justice on Dec 2, 1853.

Although there were complaints to London about the appointment from local citizens, the appointment was confirmed by the colonial office. Cameron became the first Chief Justice in the colony and the first chief justice in any part of what later became to the province of British Columbia. He continued as Chief Justice until 1858, and remained on the bench until October 11, 1865.

His salary was 100 pounds per year. The colony was not permitted to pay salaries from land sales and the only other revenue of colony at the time came from licensing liquor dealers. Those revenues paid his salary.

On February 28, 1856 at direction of London, Douglas established an elected legislative assembly for the Colony of Vancouver Island which began with 7 representatives: John Muir, Dr. J. S. Helmcken, Thomas J Skinner, J. D Pemberton, Dr John F. Kennedy, James Yates, E.E. Langford. The first legislative assembly west of the Great Lakes first met August 12. 1856. Cameron examined their credentials and swore them in.

In November 1858 Cameron, as Chief Justice of Vancouver Island, attended with Matthew Baillie Begbie, just arrived as judge elect of the new colony of British Columbia, and Governor Douglas at Fort Langley. On November 19 Douglas swore Begbie in followed by Begbie reading Her Majesty's commission appointing Douglas Governor of the Colony of British Columbia in addition to his continuing role as Governor of Vancouver Island. At the same time the HBC licence for exclusive trade was revoked.

In planning a court system for the Colony of British Columbia, Begbie used the system Cameron had developed for the Colony of Vancouver Island as a model. When the colonies merged, in 1858 it was decided that officials should have professional training. Begbie took over the role of chief justice for both former colonies. Cameron continued as a justice until he resigned October 11, 1865.

== Geographic names ==
Cameron Lake is named after David Cameron. Edith Point in Campbell Bay on Mayne Island is named after Cameron's daughter.
