= Cottonwood, British Columbia =

Cottonwood
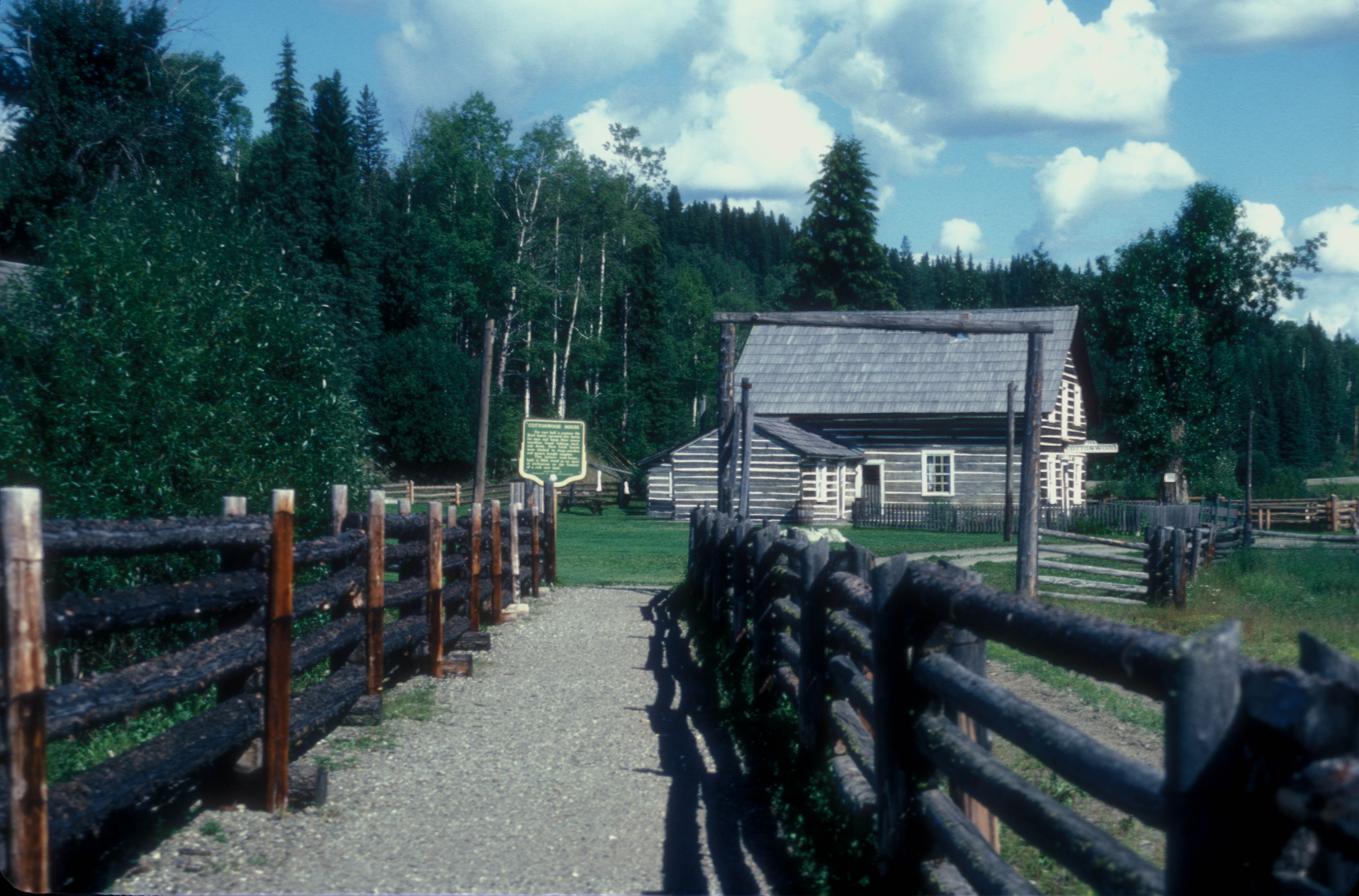
- Cottonwood House

- Location of Cottonwood in British Columbia
- Coordinates: 53°03′00″N 122°09′15″W
- Country: Canada
- Province: British Columbia
- Area codes: 250, 778

Cottonwood, including the Cottonwood Ranch and Cottonwood House, is an unincorporated settlement in the North Cariboo region of the Central Interior of British Columbia, Canada. Originally a ranch, it is located in the northern Cariboo Plateau, 8 km northwest of Coldspring House. It is at the confluence of the Swift River and Lightning Creek, which is the beginning of the Cottonwood River. Lightning Creek was one of the more famous gold-bearing creeks of the Cariboo Gold Rush.

== Cottonwood House Historic Site ==
Cottonwood House Historic Site is a store, museum and heritage property located on the right bank of the Cottonwood River, adjacent to the highway from Quesnel to Wells and Barkerville, which was the "capital" of the Cariboo Gold Rush. The route of the highway is nearly identical to that of the Cariboo Wagon Road, which ran from Yale at the foot of the Fraser Canyon and the head of steamboat navigation on the Fraser to Barkerville. Cottonwood House was the last major roadhouse on the route before its terminus at Barkerville, although Coldspring House and Beaver Pass House are just further along the route. Its provincial park status was cancelled by Order in Council in 1999, but it remains a provincial heritage property.

== Cottonwood Scandal ==
Land dealings by Chief Justice Matthew Baillie Begbie in the area of Cottonwood became the focus of a scandal in the later 19th Century. Begbie denied any impropriety and papers relating to the scandal were all destroyed.

== See also ==
- List of historic ranches in British Columbia
