= Chee Kung Tong Building =

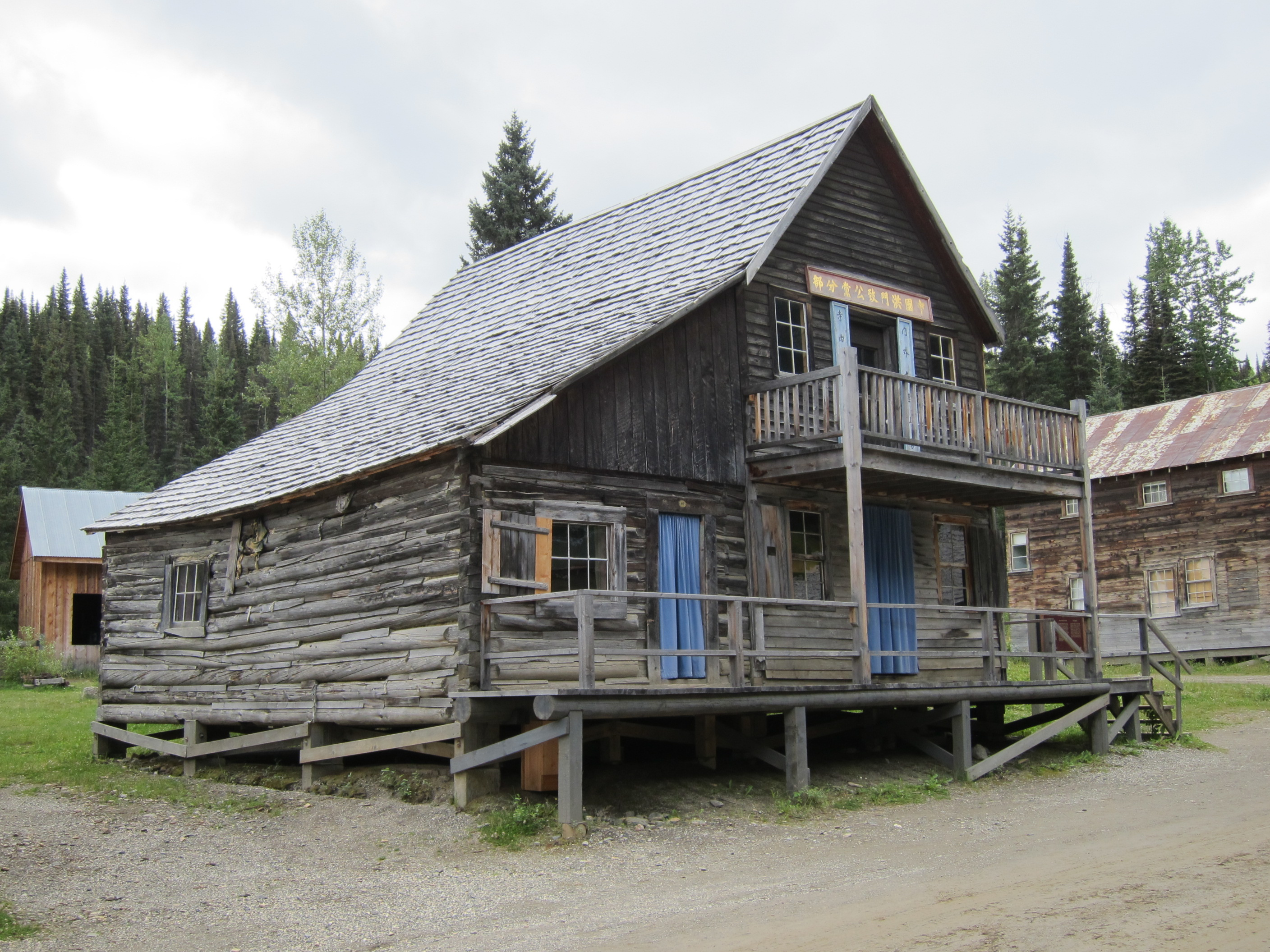
- The building in 2012

- Location of Chee Kung Tong Building Chee Kung Tong Building (Canada)

General information
- Location: Barkerville, British Columbia, Canada
- Coordinates: 53°3.92′N 121°31.12′W
- Construction started: 1874; 152 years ago
- Completed: 1877; 149 years ago

The Chee Kung Tong Building is a Canadian historic building in Barkerville, British Columbia. The building is a rare surviving example of Canadian Chinese benevolent society architecture. It consists of a two-story wooden structure with two log lean-tos on the north and east sides and a balcony. The ground floor is divided into a hostel, kitchen, and socializing space and the top floor was divided between a society hall and an alter room. It is among the oldest surviving structures in the town.

The building was constructed from 1874 to 1877. It was used by members of the Chee Kung Tong as a place for Chinese immigrants to find shelter and job opportunities. It was designated as a historical site in 2008.
