= St. Saviour's Anglican Church (Barkerville, British Columbia) =

Building in British Columbia, Canada

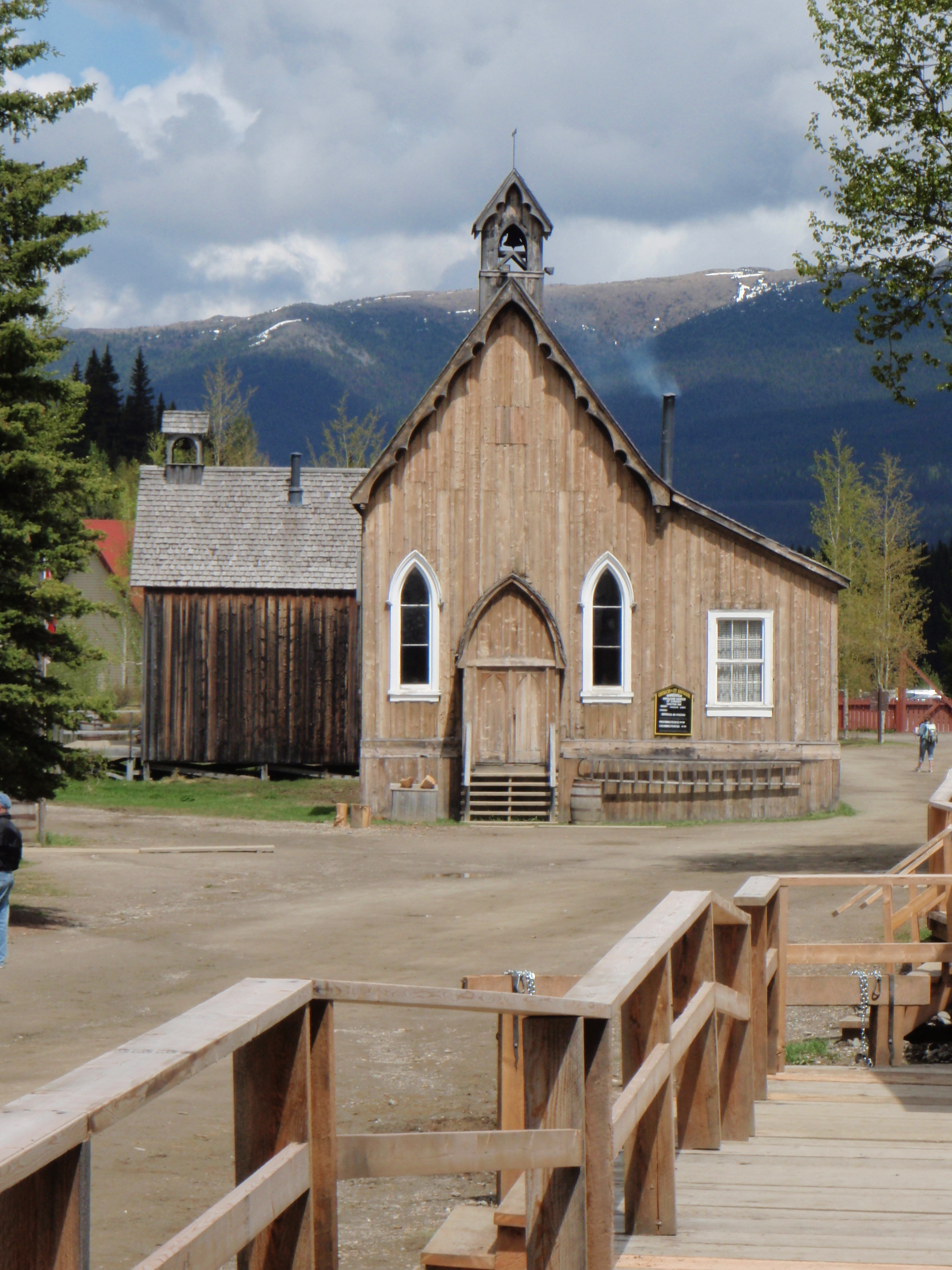
- St. Saviour's Anglican Church, the building on left is an old Methodist Church

General information
- Architectural style: Carpenter Gothic
- Location: Barkerville, British Columbia, Canada
- Coordinates: 53.06821°N 121.51563°W
- Construction started: 1868
- Completed: ca. 1870

Technical details
- Structural system: one-storey wooden frame, high pitched roof

Design and construction
- Architect: The Rev. James Reynard
- Engineer: unknown; builders: John Bruce & J.G. Mann

St. Saviour's Anglican Church is an historic one-storey rustic Carpenter Gothic Anglican church building located in the National Historic Site of Barkerville, British Columbia. Designed by the Rev. James Reynard, it was built by John Bruce and J. G. Mann. Construction began in 1868 but was not finished until after the church's first service was held on September 18, 1870. Its Carpenter Gothic architectural features include lancet windows and board and batten walls on the exterior as well as interior. A porch on the right side which appeared in early photographs is no longer in existence. Today it is part of Barkerville Historic Town and admission to the church is included in the price of admission to the town. Lay services are conducted in the church most days during the summer season.

Currently, St. Saviour's is featured in Craig Spence's novel in progress Stained Glass. The church is also used as a music venue.
