= William Barker (prospector) =

English prospector (1817–1894)

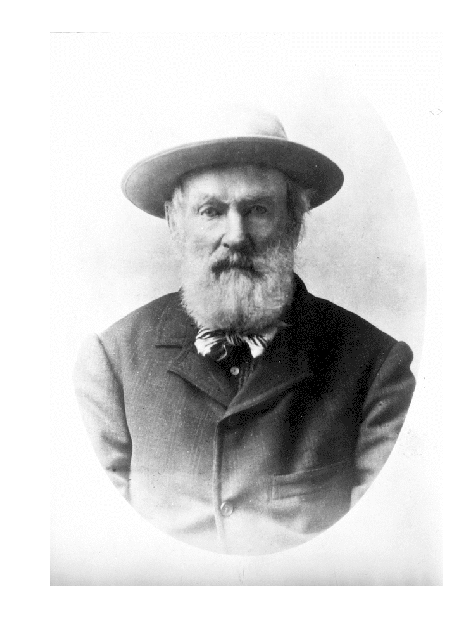
Billy Barker in the 1860s

William Barker (1817–1894), also known as Billy Barker, was an English prospector who was famous for being one of the first to find a large amount of gold in the Cariboo of British Columbia. He was also the founder and namesake of Barkerville, the most significant town during the Cariboo Gold Rush, which is preserved as a historic town.

== Biography ==
Barker was born in 1817 in March, Cambridgeshire, England, and was baptized on 7 June 1817 in St Wendreda's Church, March. As a child he worked as a waterman on the waterways of England.

He married widow Jane Lavender in Bluntisham, Huntingdonshire, in 1839, and they had one daughter named Emma Eliza (born 1840).

By the 1840s, railways had begun to replace canal transport in England, and Barker decided he would try his luck in America. He left his wife and child in England in penury; his wife died in the workhouse in Doddington, Cambridgeshire, in 1850. Barker traveled to California, where he made little during the California Gold Rush, and afterward moved to British Columbia with many fellow miners as part of the British Columbia gold rushes. His party discovered gold in the Williams Creek area, and his fellow crew member "Dutch Bill" Wilhelm Dietz was the first to find a good amount of gold in the Creek Valley area.

In 1862, Barker decided to search for gold downriver, close to Stout's Gulch. Many people said he was crazy for doing this, but, after a short period of time, his party pulled out about 60 ounces (1,700 g) of gold at a depth of about 52 feet below ground. Barker's claim turned out to be the richest in the area, and the settlement of Barkerville was set up around his claim. He ultimately pulled out roughly 37,500 ounces (1,060 kg) of gold during his life. It was said that Barker smoked as many as 30 cigarettes a day, finding it hard to deal with the stress of having that much gold, as well as the progressive symptoms of Parkinson's disease.

In 1863, Barker married the widow Elizabeth Collyer; she died on 21 May 1865 at the age of 38. The previous year Barker had sold his shares in the claim that had made him famous, since most of the "lead" gold had been cleared out. He may have thought he had made enough to live comfortably and still invest in further ventures, but his fortunes declined. His reputed generosity may also have contributed to his impoverishment.

He died penniless in a Victoria nursing home on 11 July 1894 with symptoms of Parkinson's disease and/or possible cancer in his jaw. He was buried in an unmarked grave in the Ross Bay Cemetery but there has been talk of moving his grave to Barkerville, which is preserved as a historic town.

== External links and references ==
- Barkerville Historic village
- Biography at the Dictionary of Canadian Biography Online
- Billy Barker Days
