= Cameron Lake (British Columbia) =

Lake in Vancouver Island, Canada

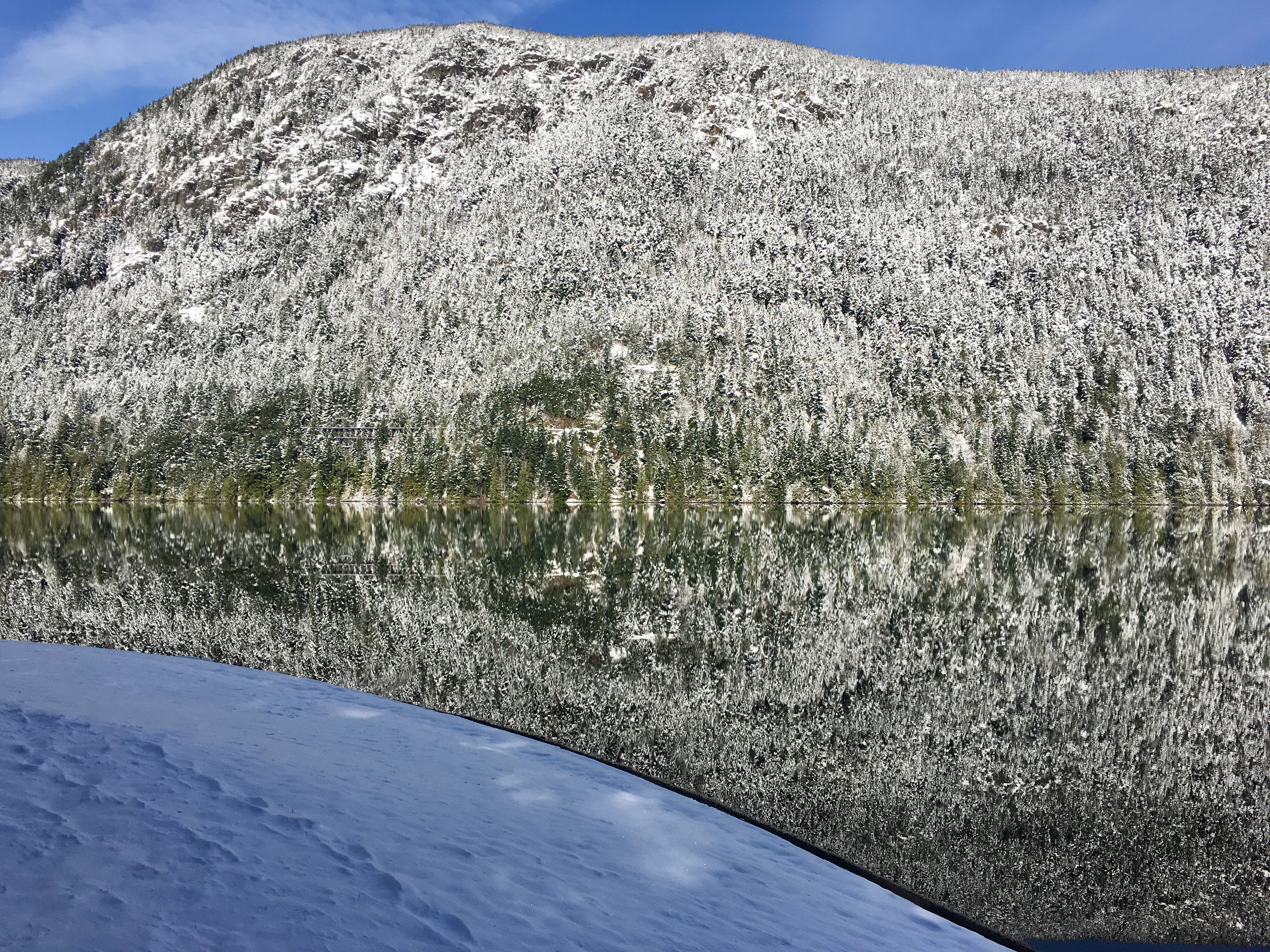
- Cameron Lake in winter from Beaufort Picnic Site with railway trestle in background

- Location within Vancouver Island
- Location: Vancouver Island, British Columbia
- Coordinates: 49°17′30″N 124°37′30″W
- Basin countries: Canada
- Surface area: 477 ha (1,180 acres)
- Surface elevation: 184 m (604 ft)

Cameron Lake is a lake in Canada's central Vancouver Island located 15 km east of Port Alberni, on the north side of Highway 4. It has an area of 477 hectares and an elevation of 184 metres above sea level. Its mean depth is 28 meters, with a maximum depth of 46 meters. Cameron Lake is fed by the Cameron River and its primary outlet is the Little Qualicum River. Accordingly it is part of the Little Qualicum Water Region, which drains into the Strait of Georgia near the town of Qualicum Beach.

The lake sits between Mount Arrowsmith to the south and Mount Horne and Mount Wesley to the north. It was named by Captain George Henry Richards in 1860 for David Cameron, the first Chief Justice of Vancouver Island.

The entire southern shore of the lake is incorporated in the Little Qualicum Falls Provincial Park Cameron Lake is a popular site for recreation, including fishing, paddling, swimming and windsurfing.

There are popular legends about sightings of a "mysterious creature" in Cameron Lake. In the summer of 2009, the B.C. Cryptozoology Club was not able to identify the source of earlier sightings of what may have been a large trout or something larger leading to speculation about some sort of sea serpent. In February 2016 researcher John Kirk and his team detected something big in the water, however, their underwater camera became detached. Kirk speculates the mysterious lake creature could be a giant sturgeon, a huge eel or a massive salamander.

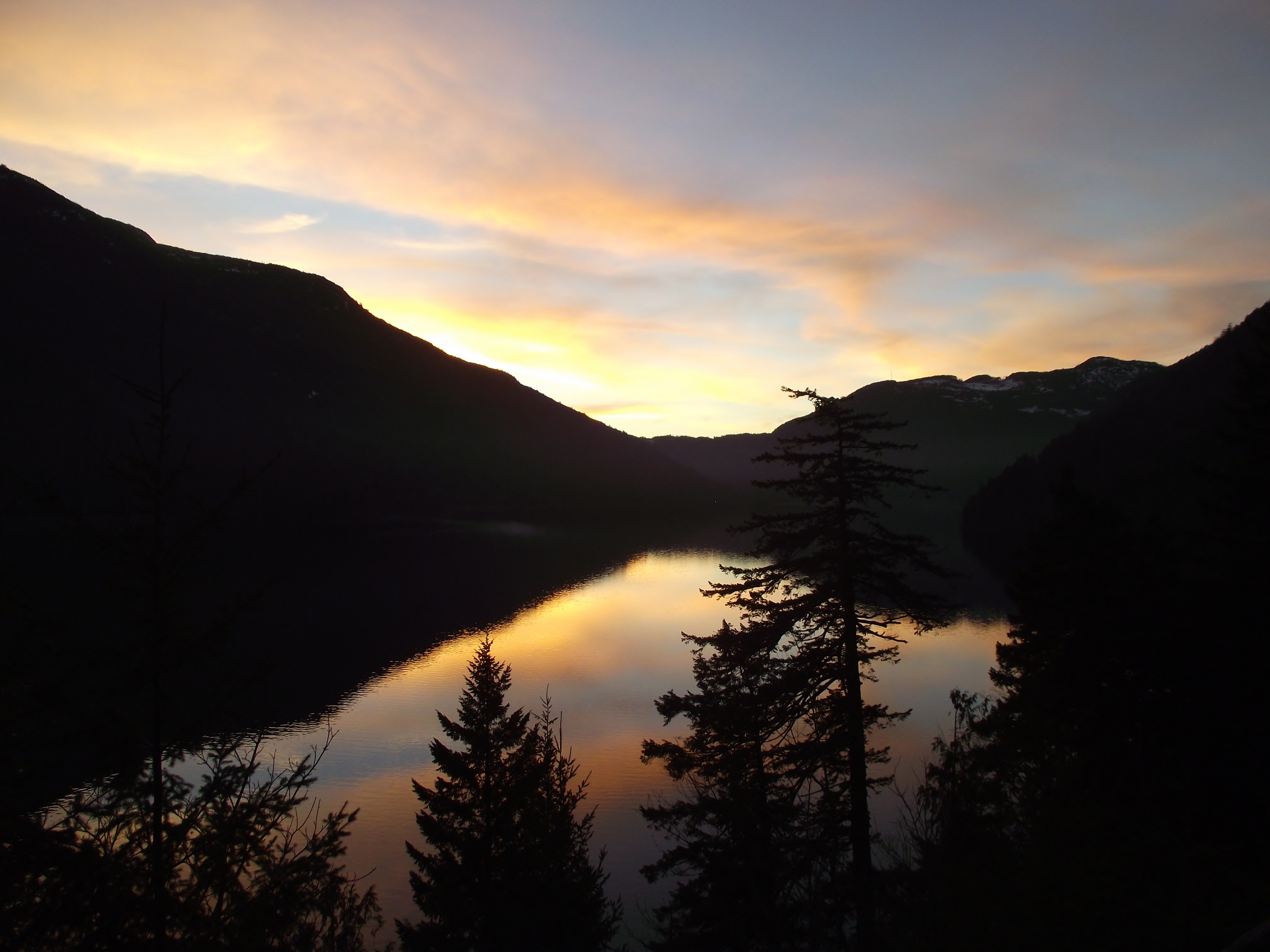
Cameron Lake, BC at dusk, viewed from the north

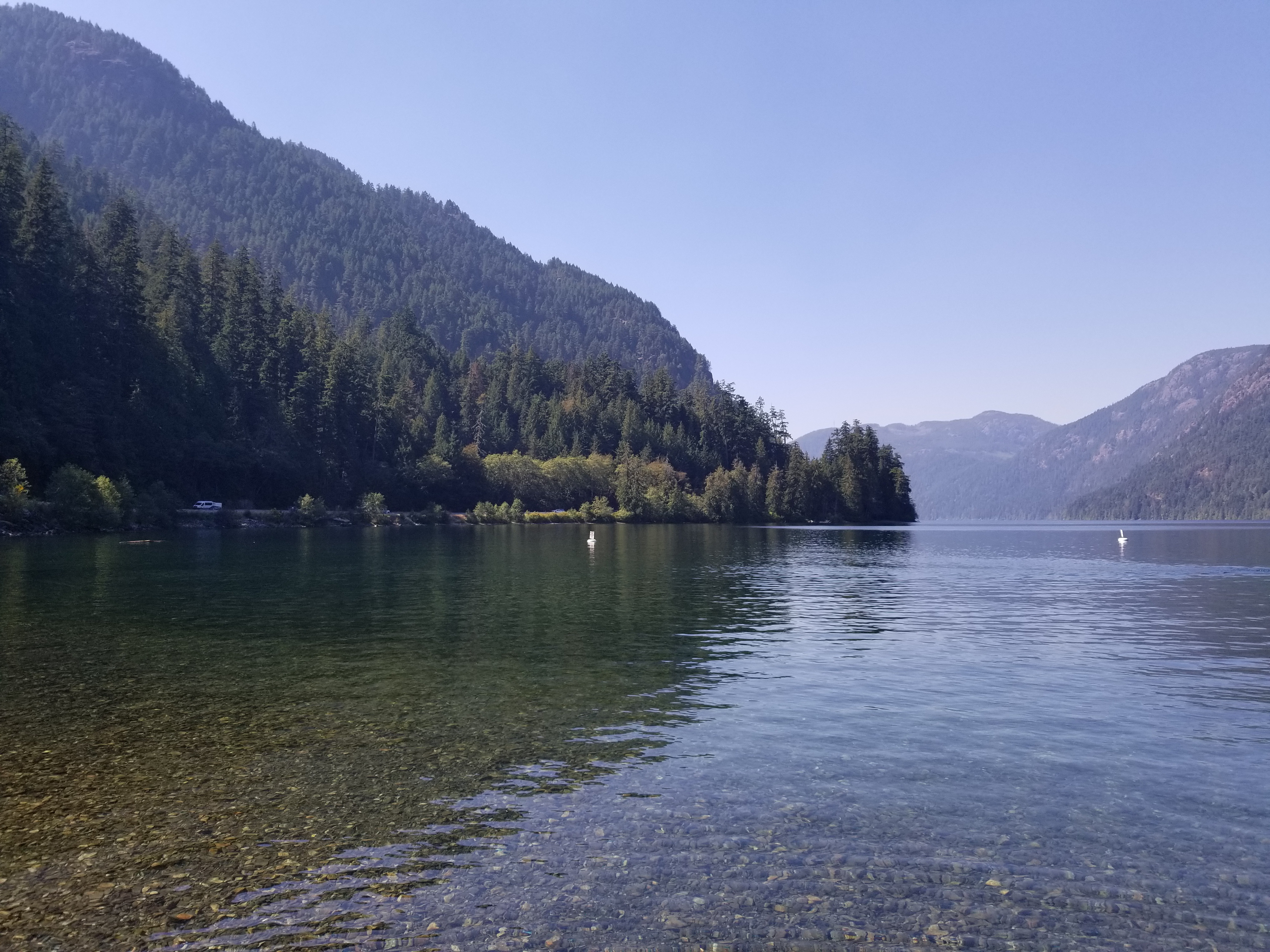
Cameron Lake

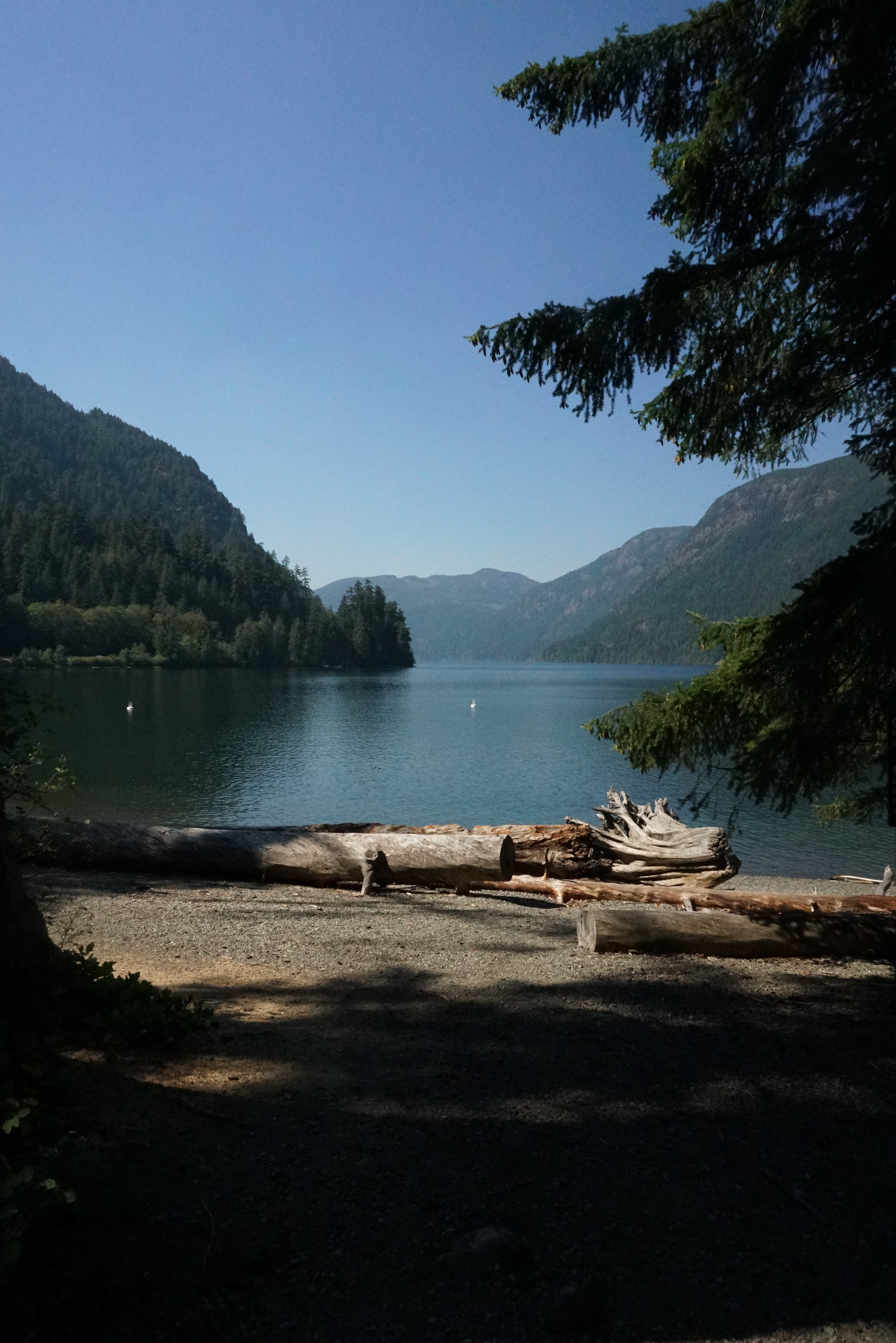
View of Cameron Lake from shore

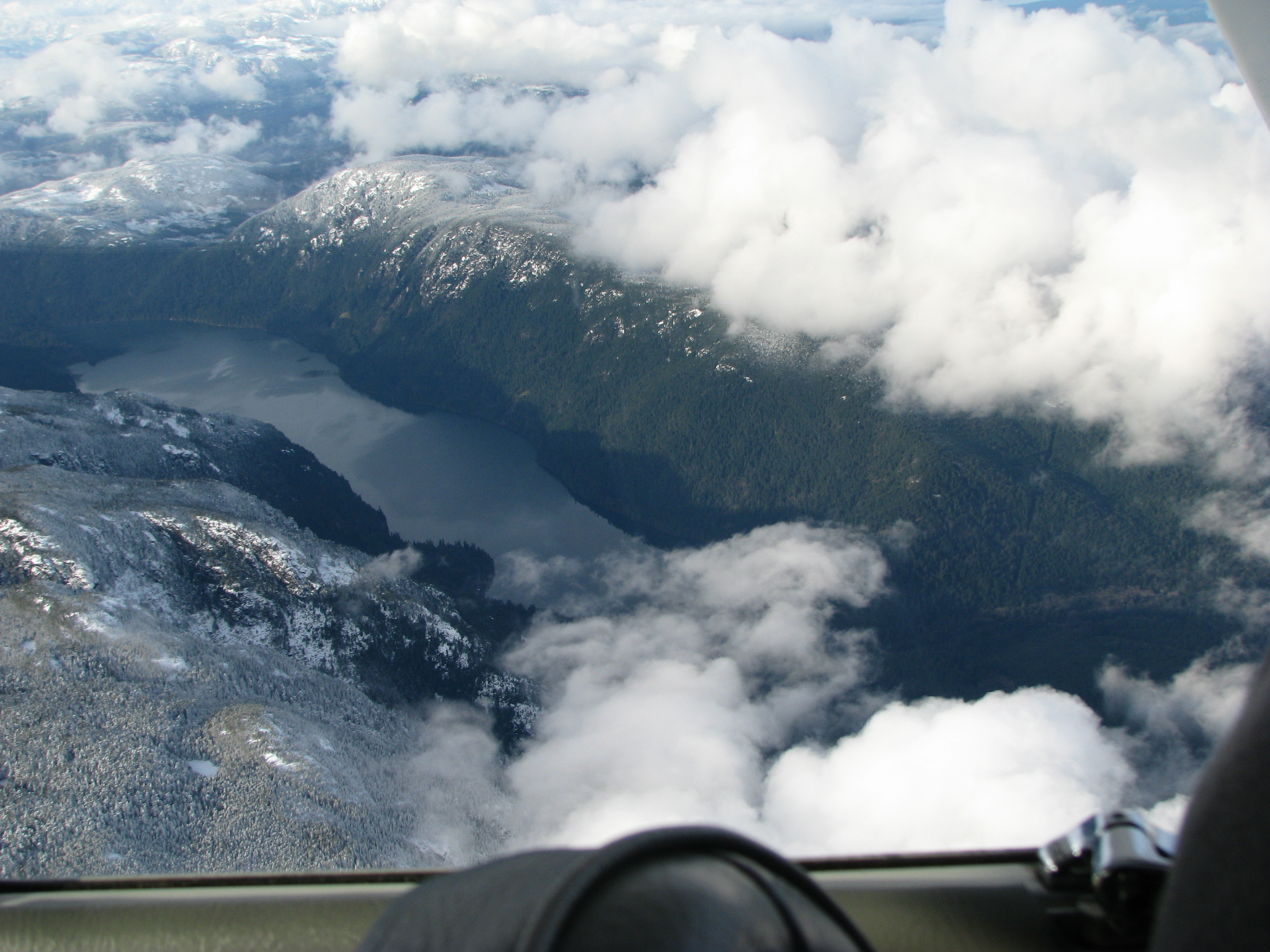
Aerial view of Cameron Lake

== See also ==
- List of lakes of British Columbia
