= Cottonwood Canyon (British Columbia) =

- Location within British Columbia

Geography
- Location: British Columbia, Canada
- Coordinates: 55°05′00″N 128°12′00″W
- River: Skeena River
- Interactive map of Cottonwood Canyon

Cottonwood Canyon is a canyon on the Skeena River in northwestern British Columbia, Canada. It is located around the mouth of Sedan Creek, between the communities of Cedarvale and Kitwanga.

== See also ==
- Steamboats of the Skeena River
- Kitselas Canyon
