= British Columbia Highway 26 =

Highway in British Columbia

Highway 26
- Barkerville Highway
- Highway 26 highlighted in red

Route information
- Maintained by the Ministry of Transportation and Infrastructure
- Length: 81.09 km (50.39 mi)
- Existed: 1967–present

Major junctions
- West end: Highway 97 in Quesnel
- East end: Barkerville

Location
- Country: Canada
- Province: British Columbia

Highway system
- British Columbia provincial highways
← Highway 24	→ Highway 27

Highway 26, also known as the Barkerville Highway, is a minor east–west highway in the North Cariboo region of the Central Interior of British Columbia, Canada. First opened in 1967, it provides access to the community of Wells and the famous gold rush town of Barkerville at the foot of the Cariboo Mountains, respectively 75 and 81 km (47 and 50 mi) east of the highway's junction with Highway 97 at Quesnel. Also accessed by the route is Bowron Lakes Provincial Park, a popular canoeing expedition circuit, the cutoff for which is between Barkerville and Wells. Since Highway 26 is very lightly travelled, it has not needed any major improvements since its opening. Its route is approximately the same as that of the Cariboo Wagon Road.

== Major intersections ==
The entire route is in Cariboo Regional District.

Location	km	mi	Destinations	Notes
Quesnel	0.00	0.00	Highway 97 – Williams Lake, Prince George	Western terminus; road continues as Airport Road
Wells	74.14	46.07		
Barkerville	81.09	50.39	Barkerville welcome center	Eastern terminus
1.000 mi = 1.609 km; 1.000 km = 0.621 mi

== See also ==
- Cottonwood House
- Coldspring House
- Beaver Pass House
- Stanley, British Columbia
