= Coldspring House =

- Location of Coldspring House in British Columbia
- Coordinates: 53°01′00″N 122°05′00″W
- Country: Canada
- Province: British Columbia

Coldspring House is an unincorporated locality and former roadhouse on the Cariboo Wagon Road in the Cariboo Country of the Central Interior of British Columbia, Canada. Located just east of the confluence of Lightning Creek and the Swift River between Quesnel and Barkerville along that route. Only 8 km east along that road from Cottonwood House, another roadhouse still operating as a store and campground today, as well as a provincial heritage property with a small museum. Further along the route, which is today's BC Highway 26, is Beaver Pass House. All date from the era of the Cariboo Gold Rush and were busy stopping places for travellers going to and from the goldfields.
