= Wells, British Columbia =

Wells
- District municipality
- District of Wells
- Location of Wells in British Columbia
- Coordinates: 53°06′06″N 121°34′32″W
- Country: Canada
- Province: British Columbia
- Region: Cariboo
- Regional district: Cariboo Regional District
- Incorporated: 1998

Government
  - Governing body: Wells Council

Area
  - Total: 158.28 km^{2} (61.11 sq mi)
- Elevation: 1,200 m (3,900 ft)

Population (2021)
  - Total: 218
  - Density: 1.4/km^{2} (3.6/sq mi)
- Time zone: UTC−07:00 (PT)
- Highways: Highway 26
- Website: www.wells.ca

Wells is a small mining and tourist town in the Cariboo District of central British Columbia, located on BC Highway 26, 74 km (46 mi) from Quesnel and 8 km (5 mi) before the highway's terminus at Barkerville. It gains much of its revenue and jobs from tourists who pass through on their way to the Bowron Lake Provincial Park and to the historic museum town of Barkerville.

== History ==
Originally a company town, it was managed by Cariboo Gold Quartz Mine. Fred M. Wells, for whom the town was named, prospected in the area for 10 years before finding the minerals that built the company. At its heyday of the 1930s, Wells sported 4500 people. In 1942 it had a greater population than Quesnel or Prince George. The closure of the gold and other mineral mines in 1967 took its toll on the town and most of the population moved away. Today it has a listed population of just 250 which doubles during the summer months.

Between May and September, Wells sees over 100,000 tourists pass through on their way to Barkerville. Some visitors stay or camp overnight in Wells, which has an active arts and outdoor entertainment sector. During the winter months, visitors come for the cross-country ski trails, snowmobiling, and artistic and study retreats.

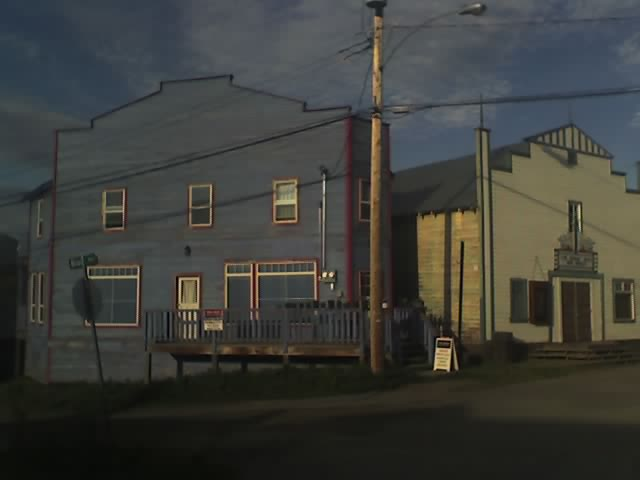
Commercial buildings on Main Street, Sunset Theatre at right

== Climate ==
Wells doesn't have a weather station, but Barkerville did (located 7 km (4.3 mi) away). Wells has a subarctic climate (Köppen climate classification Dfc), resulting in long, cold and snowy winters, accompanied by short and cool summers due to its high altitude and latitude. Its growing season averages only 66 days. It is located at the mouth of Jack of Clubs Creek, and defined as the source of the Willow River at the outflow of the Jack of Clubs Lake.

Climate data for Barkerville (1981-2007 normals, extremes 1888-2007)
Month	Jan	Feb	Mar	Apr	May	Jun	Jul	Aug	Sep	Oct	Nov	Dec	Year
Record high °C (°F)	10.0 (50.0)	15.0 (59.0)	17.2 (63.0)	27.8 (82.0)	31.5 (88.7)	33.0 (91.4)	35.6 (96.1)	33.9 (93.0)	32.5 (90.5)	26.7 (80.1)	18.9 (66.0)	14.4 (57.9)	35.6 (96.1)
Mean daily maximum °C (°F)	−2.9 (26.8)	−0.5 (31.1)	3.0 (37.4)	7.2 (45.0)	12.5 (54.5)	16.2 (61.2)	18.8 (65.8)	19.0 (66.2)	14.0 (57.2)	7.2 (45.0)	−0.3 (31.5)	−3.5 (25.7)	7.6 (45.7)
Daily mean °C (°F)	−7.5 (18.5)	−5.9 (21.4)	−2.8 (27.0)	1.4 (34.5)	6.2 (43.2)	10.0 (50.0)	12.3 (54.1)	12.1 (53.8)	8.0 (46.4)	2.4 (36.3)	−4.3 (24.3)	−7.8 (18.0)	2.0 (35.6)
Mean daily minimum °C (°F)	−12.1 (10.2)	−11.2 (11.8)	−8.5 (16.7)	−4.4 (24.1)	0.0 (32.0)	3.8 (38.8)	5.8 (42.4)	5.3 (41.5)	2.1 (35.8)	−2.3 (27.9)	−8.3 (17.1)	−12.0 (10.4)	−3.5 (25.7)
Record low °C (°F)	−46.7 (−52.1)	−43.3 (−45.9)	−37.2 (−35.0)	−26.1 (−15.0)	−15.0 (5.0)	−6.7 (19.9)	−3.9 (25.0)	−7.8 (18.0)	−13.3 (8.1)	−30.5 (−22.9)	−42.0 (−43.6)	−41.7 (−43.1)	−46.7 (−52.1)
Average precipitation mm (inches)	96.0 (3.78)	60.7 (2.39)	66.4 (2.61)	58.2 (2.29)	77.7 (3.06)	101.9 (4.01)	100.0 (3.94)	80.6 (3.17)	81.7 (3.22)	92.3 (3.63)	111.2 (4.38)	95.0 (3.74)	1,021.7 (40.22)
Average rainfall mm (inches)	8.2 (0.32)	3.4 (0.13)	8.6 (0.34)	25.6 (1.01)	66.0 (2.60)	101.1 (3.98)	100.0 (3.94)	80.6 (3.17)	80.4 (3.17)	64.6 (2.54)	19.3 (0.76)	2.5 (0.10)	560.3 (22.06)
Average snowfall cm (inches)	87.8 (34.6)	57.3 (22.6)	57.8 (22.8)	32.6 (12.8)	11.7 (4.6)	0.8 (0.3)	0 (0)	0 (0)	1.3 (0.5)	27.7 (10.9)	91.9 (36.2)	92.6 (36.5)	461.4 (181.7)
Average precipitation days (≥ 0.2 mm)	16.6	12.5	13.8	14.3	18.7	20.6	19.2	16.0	16.3	18.0	18.7	17.1	201.7
Average rainy days (≥ 0.2 mm)	1.4	1.2	2.9	8.2	17.6	20.5	19.2	16.0	16.2	13.9	3.8	1.0	121.9
Average snowy days (≥ 0.2 cm)	15.9	11.8	12.2	8.4	3.0	0.3	0	0	0.6	6.5	16.4	16.6	91.8

== Demographics ==
In the 2021 Census of Population conducted by Statistics Canada, Wells had a population of 218 living in 113 of its 156 total private dwellings, a change of 0.5% from its 2016 population of 217. With a land area of 158.09 km^{2} (61.04 sq mi), it had a population density of 1.4/km^{2} (3.6/sq mi) in 2021.

== See also ==
- Official website
- Wells-Barkerville travel guide from Wikivoyage
- List of communities in British Columbia

== Notes ==
1. There is no longer active weather monitoring at Barkerville as of 2007.
