= Lightning Creek (British Columbia) =

Stream in northern British Columbia, Canada

Lightning Creek is a creek located in the Cariboo region of British Columbia. This creek flows into the Swift River and was discovered in 1861 by Cunningham, Bell and Hume. Lightning Creek was mined for gold. A problem mining this creek is the depth of the bedrock and the flooding of the deep diggings. In 1876 half a dozen companies were operating pumps twenty four hours a day and raising almost 20 million gallons per day in an effort to keep the ground drained. The total value of the gold yielded from the creek is about $15,000,000. The tributaries on the south side of this creek yielded gold, but those on the north side yielded little gold.
