= Barkerville =

- Historic site
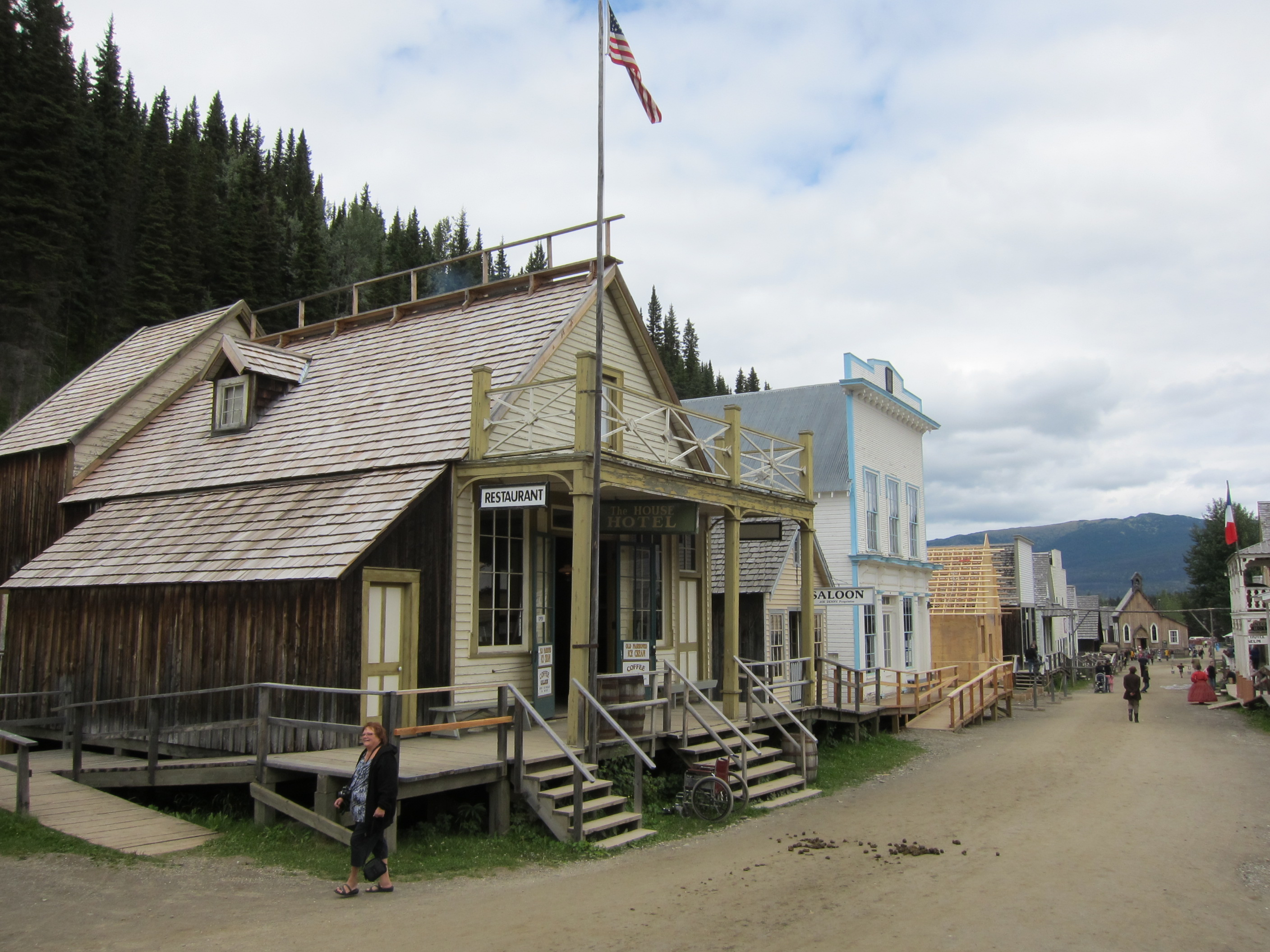
- Barkerville's main street, 2012

- Location of Barkerville
- Coordinates: 53°03′57″N 121°31′02″W
- Country: Canada
- Province: British Columbia
- District: Cariboo Regional District
- Founded: 1862
- Historical town: 1958
- Named for: William Barker
- Elevation: 1,230 m (4,040 ft)

Population
  - 1863: ~10,000 (Peak)
- Area codes: 250, 236, 778
- Highways: Highway 26
- Website: www.barkerville.ca

National Historic Site of Canada
- Designated: 1924

Barkerville was the main town of the Cariboo Gold Rush in British Columbia, Canada, and is preserved as a historic town. It is located on the north slope of the Cariboo Plateau near the Cariboo Mountains 80 kilometres (50 mi) east of Quesnel. BC Highway 26, which follows the route of the Cariboo Wagon Road, the original access to Barkerville, goes through it.

== History ==
=== Founding ===
Barkerville is located on the western edge of the Cariboo Mountains in British Columbia. It was named after Billy Barker from Cambridgeshire, England, who was among those who first struck gold at the location in 1862. His claim was the richest and the most famous.

Barkerville was built up almost overnight, and was a case of "growth via word of mouth". It grew as fast as the word of Barker's strike spread. His claim would eventually yield 37,500 ounces (1,065 kg/2,350 lb) of gold.

Before the construction of the Cariboo Wagon Road, people hauled their own supplies to Barkerville, either on their backs or in a pack train. Because supplies were scarce, the prices of even the most everyday items were extremely high. High prices for goods in Barkerville did not ease up until the Cariboo Road had been finished, when goods could be transported by huge freight wagons. Soon, movers of freight boasted that they could pack and carry a set of champagne glasses without any breakage—for a price, of course. More women came to Barkerville after the construction of the Cariboo Road.

Cattle were driven north up the Okanagan valley via what is now Highway 97 into Canada to provide meat for the miners and residents of Barkerville.

=== Growth ===
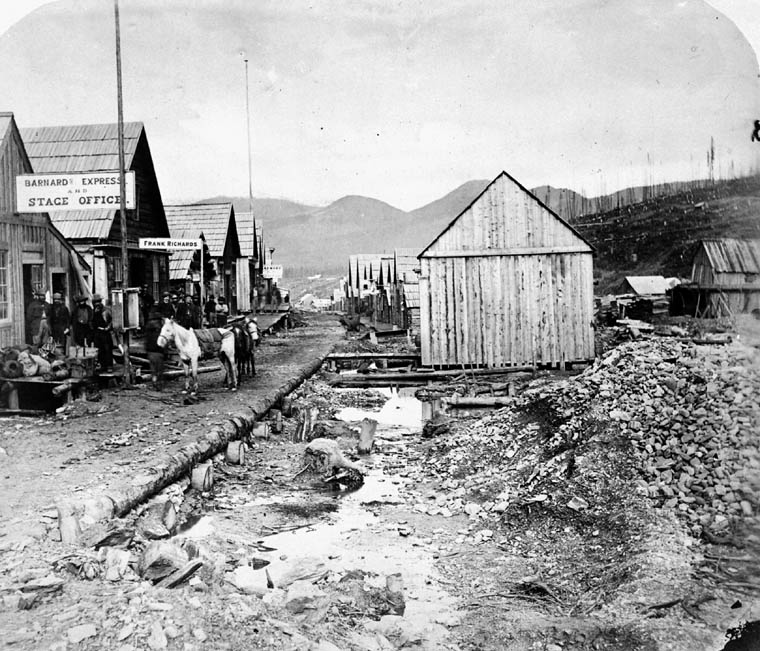
Barkerville (1865)

At first, Barkerville was a lone building built by Billy Barker and the prospectors who traveled with him. The town would then rapidly grow, filling out with homes, water wheels and flumes..

Even though its population was transient and largely dependent on mining, Barkerville was becoming more of a real community. It had several general stores and boarding houses, a drugstore that also sold newspapers and cigars, a barbershop that cut women's as well as men's hair, the "Wake-Up Jake Restaurant and Coffee Salon", a theatre (the Theatre Royal), and a literary society (the Cariboo Literary Society). In 1867, the Hudson's Bay Company (HBC) opened a store in Barkerville and served as headquarters of HBC's Cariboo District.

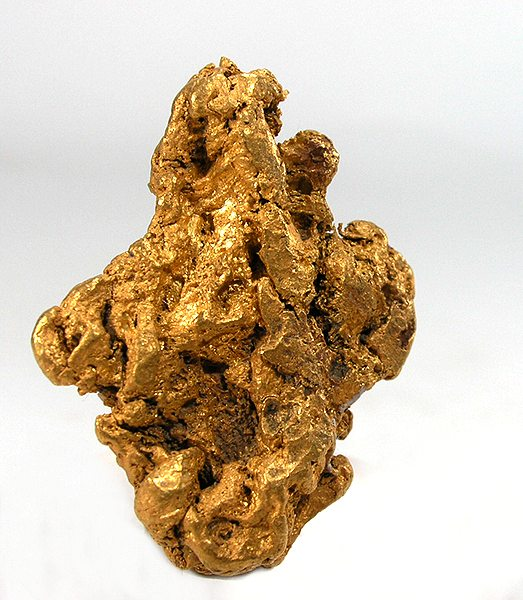
Gold nugget from Emery Gulch, near Barkerville. Weight 35 g (1.2 oz).

Horse racing and prize fighting were common entertainments. Among the so-called "sober set," church services were extremely well attended. The general stores were the most profitable of the merchants. As they had the only source of food, the store owners could increase the price of foods and supplies. In the height of the gold rush, the stores sold flour for as high as $1.25 per pound. Beans, meat, and dried fruit were sold for a dollar a pound. But as the gold rush ended, the stores went bankrupt and finally out of business.

People of Chinese descent were an important part of Barkerville life for almost a hundred years. They established a number of businesses, including the Kwong Lee Company of Victoria., a general store that sold groceries, clothing, hardware, and mining tools. The company had stores in other parts of British Columbia, but the Barkerville store was one of the most impressive in town. The Chinese community also built cabins (for Chinese miners, who saved money by sharing four or five to a cabin) and Tai Ping (the "Peace Room"), the equivalent of a modern nursing home. Chinese benevolent associations provided social services to the Chinese community, and also resolved disputes within the Chinese community without the use of BC courts.

=== Decline ===
On September 16, 1868, Barkerville was destroyed by a fire that spread quickly through the wooden buildings. Rebuilding began immediately, and at an impressive pace. Within six weeks, ninety buildings had been rebuilt. Boardwalks were improved, and the narrow and winding main street was widened and straightened. By 1880, there were enough children in the area to build the Barkerville School. It had thirteen pupils and one piece of school equipment—a chalkboard.

Nevertheless, Barkerville's population was declining by the end of the 19th century and it eventually had only a few residents. The HBC store closed in 1884. It had a revival in the 1930s, when the Great Depression caused widespread unemployment, and the price of gold skyrocketed, but as the depression turned for the better, Barkerville declined to a very small village.

=== Preservation ===
On 12 January 1959, BC Parks established Barkerville Historic Park by Order-in-Council with an initial area of 64.84 hectares (160.2 acres). This was increased in 1973 to 457.29 hectares (1,130.0 acres).

In 1998, Barkerville Historic Park was dissolved and two properties were created: Barkerville Provincial Park and Barkerville Historic Town (Provincial Heritage Property). Barkerville Provincial Park converted from Order In Canada to statute designation in 2000; the whole area consisted of roughly 55 hectares (140 acres). However, in 2006, the BC Ministry of the Environment repealed "Barkerville Provincial Park" and transferred ownership of it to the Ministry of Tourism, Sport and the Arts to create Barkerville Historic Town and Park.

In 2008, Barkerville's Chee Kung Tong Building was designated a National Historic Site of Canada. The two-storey board and batten structure was completed in 1877 and originally used by the Chee Kung Tong organization, a benevolent association for recent arrivals. It is representative of the community building among immigrant Chinese labourers and merchants in new settlements throughout Canada.

== Barkerville Historic Town and Park ==
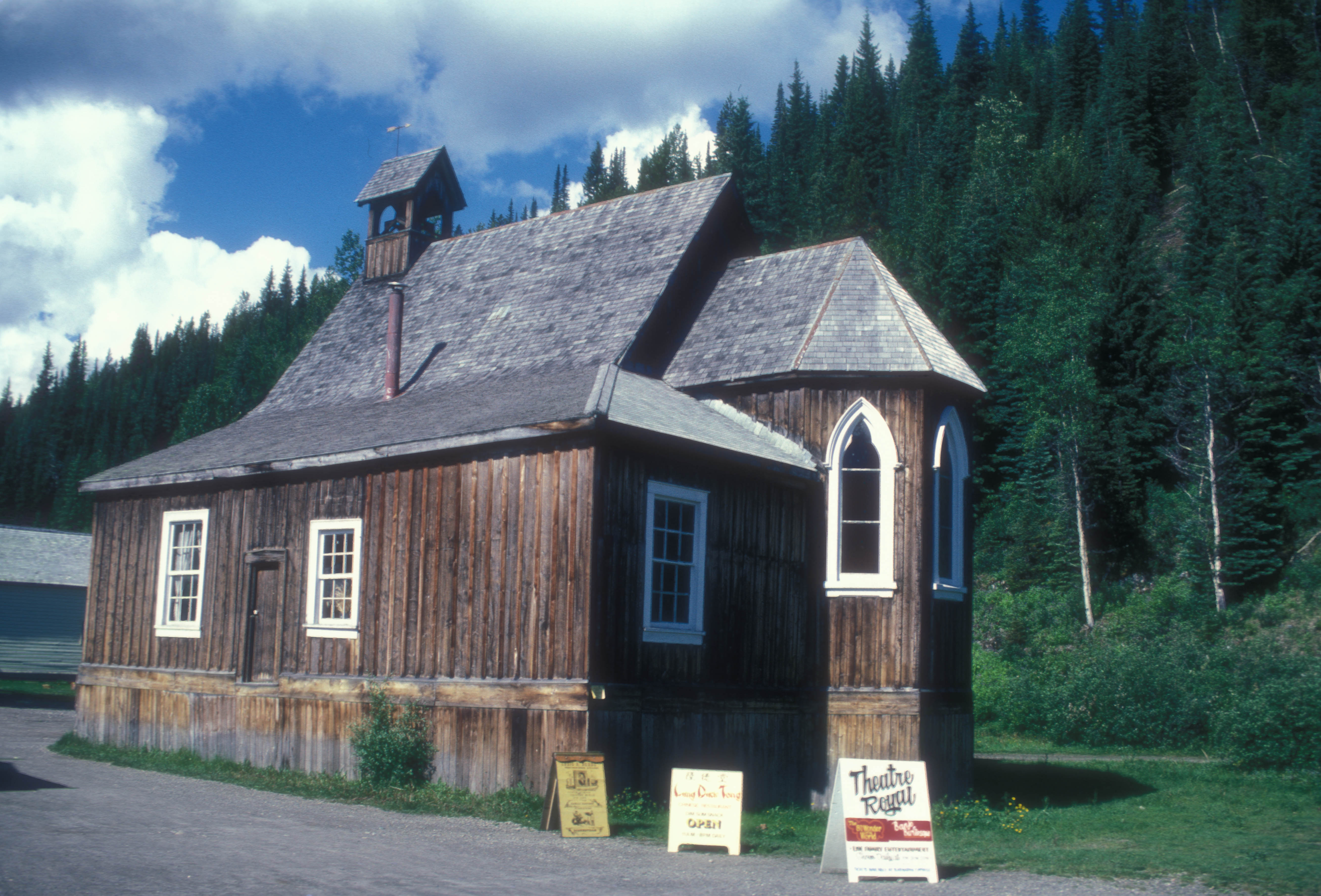
St. Saviour's Anglican Church

Barkerville Historic Town and Park Camping Sites consists of three sites: Government Hill Site (7.4 acres), Lowhee Site (49.4 acres), and Forest Rose Site (79 acres), all of which are operated by Barkerville Historic Town and Park.

The restoration of Barkerville was not a quick process. In the 1940s some of the buildings were torn down, considered fire hazards. Several people passing through Barkerville stole from the decrepit town, as to them it was fully abandoned. Despite this, the Barkerville Historic and Development Company, started by Fred Luditt, Ted Barnes, and their lawyer, would be established to repair and rejuvenate the town as a tourist attraction. Several years went by before substantial progress would be made. By 1958, Barkerville Historic Provincial Park was established, and the town would see its restoration, partly due to the provincial government of British Columbia choosing Barkerville as the major project for the province's Centennial. The Barkerville Historic and Development Company disagreed with some of the choices the provincial government made to restore the town, but the final result of the restoration was a faithful return to the town of Barkerville, circa 1869-1885.

In 1980 part of the western movie Harry Tracy, Desperado was made here. The 2022 Punjabi film, Chhalla Mud Ke Nahi Aaya, directed by Amrinder Gill, was also shot here.

== Climate ==
Barkerville has a subarctic climate (Köppen climate classification Dfc), which makes it have long, cold and snowy winter and short and cool summers due to its high altitude and latitude. Its growing season averages only 66 days.

Climate data for Barkerville (1981-2007 normals, extremes 1888-2007)
| Month | Jan | Feb | Mar | Apr | May | Jun | Jul | Aug | Sep | Oct | Nov | Dec | Year |
|---|---|---|---|---|---|---|---|---|---|---|---|---|---|
| Record high °C (°F) | 10.0 (50.0) | 15.0 (59.0) | 17.2 (63.0) | 27.8 (82.0) | 31.5 (88.7) | 33.0 (91.4) | 35.6 (96.1) | 33.9 (93.0) | 32.5 (90.5) | 26.7 (80.1) | 18.9 (66.0) | 14.4 (57.9) | 35.6 (96.1) |
| Mean daily maximum °C (°F) | −2.9 (26.8) | −0.5 (31.1) | 3.0 (37.4) | 7.2 (45.0) | 12.5 (54.5) | 16.2 (61.2) | 18.8 (65.8) | 19.0 (66.2) | 14.0 (57.2) | 7.2 (45.0) | −0.3 (31.5) | −3.5 (25.7) | 7.6 (45.7) |
| Daily mean °C (°F) | −7.5 (18.5) | −5.9 (21.4) | −2.8 (27.0) | 1.4 (34.5) | 6.2 (43.2) | 10.0 (50.0) | 12.3 (54.1) | 12.1 (53.8) | 8.0 (46.4) | 2.4 (36.3) | −4.3 (24.3) | −7.8 (18.0) | 2.0 (35.6) |
| Mean daily minimum °C (°F) | −12.1 (10.2) | −11.2 (11.8) | −8.5 (16.7) | −4.4 (24.1) | 0.0 (32.0) | 3.8 (38.8) | 5.8 (42.4) | 5.3 (41.5) | 2.1 (35.8) | −2.3 (27.9) | −8.3 (17.1) | −12.0 (10.4) | −3.5 (25.7) |
| Record low °C (°F) | −46.7 (−52.1) | −43.3 (−45.9) | −37.2 (−35.0) | −26.1 (−15.0) | −15.0 (5.0) | −6.7 (19.9) | −3.9 (25.0) | −7.8 (18.0) | −13.3 (8.1) | −30.5 (−22.9) | −42.0 (−43.6) | −41.7 (−43.1) | −46.7 (−52.1) |
| Average precipitation mm (inches) | 96.0 (3.78) | 60.7 (2.39) | 66.4 (2.61) | 58.2 (2.29) | 77.7 (3.06) | 101.9 (4.01) | 100.0 (3.94) | 80.6 (3.17) | 81.7 (3.22) | 92.3 (3.63) | 111.2 (4.38) | 95.0 (3.74) | 1,021.7 (40.22) |
| Average rainfall mm (inches) | 8.2 (0.32) | 3.4 (0.13) | 8.6 (0.34) | 25.6 (1.01) | 66.0 (2.60) | 101.1 (3.98) | 100.0 (3.94) | 80.6 (3.17) | 80.4 (3.17) | 64.6 (2.54) | 19.3 (0.76) | 2.5 (0.10) | 560.3 (22.06) |
| Average snowfall cm (inches) | 87.8 (34.6) | 57.3 (22.6) | 57.8 (22.8) | 32.6 (12.8) | 11.7 (4.6) | 0.8 (0.3) | 0.0 (0.0) | 0.0 (0.0) | 1.3 (0.5) | 27.7 (10.9) | 91.9 (36.2) | 92.6 (36.5) | 461.4 (181.7) |
| Average precipitation days (≥ 0.2 mm) | 16.6 | 12.5 | 13.8 | 14.3 | 18.7 | 20.6 | 19.2 | 16.0 | 16.3 | 18.0 | 18.7 | 17.1 | 201.7 |
| Average rainy days (≥ 0.2 mm) | 1.4 | 1.2 | 2.9 | 8.2 | 17.6 | 20.5 | 19.2 | 16.0 | 16.2 | 13.9 | 3.8 | 1.0 | 121.9 |
| Average snowy days (≥ 0.2 cm) | 15.9 | 11.8 | 12.2 | 8.4 | 3.0 | 0.3 | 0.0 | 0.0 | 0.6 | 6.5 | 16.4 | 16.6 | 91.8 |

== Notable people ==
- Bert Sincock – Major League Baseball pitcher

== See also ==
- British Columbia gold rushes
- Wells, British Columbia
- Cariboo Road
- Old Cariboo Road
- List of filming locations in the British Columbia Interior

== Notes ==
1. There is no longer active weather monitoring at Barkerville as of 2007.
