= List of natural features on the Fraser River =

This is a list of natural features on the Fraser River, including canyons, rapids, bars, named rocks and eddies and similar features. Important side canyons which figure on the river's landscape are also included (e.g. Churn Creek). Important confluences and manmade landmarks are included for reference.

- Grand Canyon of the Fraser (Robson Valley)
- confluence of Nechako River & City of Prince George
- Fort George Canyon
- Cottonwood Canyon
- Confluence of the Quesnel River & City of Quesnel
- Rich Bar
- Red Bluff
- Chimney Creek Canyon
- Soda Creek Canyon
- confluence of the Chilcotin River
- Churn Creek Canyon
- Big Bar
- Chisolm Canyon
- French Bar Canyon
- Watson Bar
- High Bar Canyon
- Moran Canyon (British Columbia)
- Pavilion Canyon (also refers to the adjacent canyon of lower Pavilion Creek)
- Glen Fraser Canyon
- Fountain Rapids (a.k.a. Upper Fountain Rapids, "the Upper Fountain")
- Fountain Canyon
- Mormon Bar/French Bar
- Bridge River Rapids (a.k.a. Lower Fountain Rapids, Six Mile Rapids, or "the Lower Fountain"
- Lillooet Canyon
- Canada Bar/Canada Flat
- Horsebeef Bar
- various named flats at Lillooet
- confluence of Cayoosh Creek/Seton River
- Seton Powerhouse
- Texas Bar
- Texas Flat
- the Big Slide
- Cameron Bar
- Foster Bar
- Spintlum's Flat
- confluence of Thompson River/Village of Lytton
- Cantilever Bar
- Van Winkle Bar
- Kanaka Bar
- Boston Bar
- Yankee Flat (North Bend)
- China Bar
- Hells Gate (and fishladders, suspension bridge)
- Dutchman Bar
- Alexandra Suspension Bridge/Kequaloose
- Alexandra Bridge
- Chapmans Bar
- Spuzzum
- Wellington Bar
- Saddle Rock
- Sailor Bar (officially Sailors Bar but known in the singular because of Sailor Bar Tunnel)
- Lady Franklin Rock, just above Yale
- Yale Bar
- Hills Bar
- Emory Bar
- Texas Bar
- Union Bar
- Cornish Bar
- Agassiz-Rosedale Bridge
- Maria Bar
- Sapperton Bar
- Steveston Bar, South Arm

== See also ==
- List of islands of the Fraser River
- List of crossings of the Fraser River
- List of tributaries of the Fraser River
