= John Wilson (British Columbia politician) =

Canadian cattle rancher, veterinarian and politician (born 1944)

MLA for Cariboo North
- In office May 28, 1996 – May 17, 2005
- Preceded by: Frank Garden
- Succeeded by: Bob Simpson

Personal details
- Born: 1944 (age 81–82)
- Party: BC Liberal
- Education: Ontario Veterinary College
- Occupation: Veterinarian

John Wilson (born 1944) is a Canadian cattle rancher, veterinarian and former politician, who served as a BC Liberal Member of the Legislative Assembly of British Columbia from 1996 until his retirement at the 2005 election, representing the riding of Cariboo North. In 2010 he made an appearance in the season one finale of Dan for Mayor, as a representative of the Office of the Prime Minister.

Wilson studied at the Ontario Veterinary College at the University of Guelph and, after graduating in 1967, moved to Quesnel, British Columbia where he established the Quesnel Veterinary Clinic. He was president of the Quesnel Cattlemen's Association.
