= Prince George-North Cariboo =

Provincial electoral district in British Columbia, Canada

British Columbia electoral district

Provincial electoral district
- Legislature: Legislative Assembly of British Columbia
MLA
Sheldon Clare
Conservative
- District created: 2023
- First contested: 2024
- Last contested: 2026

Prince George-North Cariboo is a provincial electoral district for the Legislative Assembly of British Columbia, Canada. Created under the 2021 British Columbia electoral redistribution, the riding was first contested in the 2024 British Columbia general election. It was created out of almost the entirety of Cariboo North and a part of Prince George-Valemount.

== Geography ==
The electoral district takes in areas in the Cariboo Regional District and Regional District of Fraser–Fort George, spanning from the northern municipal boundaries of Williams Lake to partway inside the municipal boundaries of the city of Prince George. Notable population centres falling within Prince George-North Cariboo include Quesnel, Wells, the College Heights neighbourhood of Prince George, and unincorporated communities to the southwest of that city.

== Members of the Legislative Assembly ==
The district has elected these MLAs throughout its existence:

Prince George-North Cariboo
Assembly	Years	Member	Party
Riding created from Cariboo North and Prince George-Valemount
43rd	2024–2026	Sheldon Clare	Conservative
44th	2026–present	Sheldon Clare	Conservative

== Election results ==
2026 British Columbia general election
The 2026 general election will be held on October 24.
Party	Candidate	Votes	%	±%	Expenditures
Conservative	Sheldon Clare	11,799	70.27		
New Democratic	Denice Bardua	3,380	20.13		
Green	Randy Thompson	1,577	9.39		
Total valid votes		16,756	99.79		
Total rejected ballots		36	0.21		
Turnout					
Registered voters					
Source: Elections BC

2024 British Columbia general election
Party	Candidate	Votes	%	±%	Expenditures
Conservative	Sheldon Clare	11,430	56.82	+49.6	$27,477.42
Independent	Coralee Oakes	4,394	21.84	-30.7	$7,335.00
New Democratic	Denice Bardua	3,426	17.03	-14.3	$4,917.96
Green	Randy Thompson	866	4.31	-4.0	$1,650.44
Total valid votes/expense limit		20,116	99.91	–	$71,700.08
Total rejected ballots		18	0.09	–	
Turnout		20,134	59.97	–	
Registered voters		33,572			
Conservative notional gain from BC United		Swing		+40.1 (Note: Swing against BC United incumbent Coralee Oakes, standing for re-election as an independent candidate.)	
Source: Elections BC

2020 provincial election redistributed results
Party	%
Liberal	52.5
New Democratic	31.3
Green	8.3
Conservative	7.2

== See also ==
- List of British Columbia provincial electoral districts
- Canadian provincial electoral districts
