= Lady Franklin =

Lady Franklin may refer to:

- Jane Franklin (1791–1875), Tasmanian pioneer and second wife of the explorer Sir John Franklin

== Buildings ==
- Jane Franklin Hall, a residential college in Hobart, Tasmania, Australia
- Lady Franklin Gallery, a historic sandstone museum in Lenah Valley, Tasmania, Australia

== Geography ==
- Lady Franklin Bay, Ellesmere Island, Nunavut, Canada
- Lady Franklin Island, Davis Strait, Nunavut, Canada
- Lady Franklin Point, Nunavut, Canada
- Lady Franklin Rock, an island in the Fraser River above Yale, British Columbia, Canada

== Ships ==
- Lady Franklin (barque), an Australian barque best known for being seized by convicts in a mutiny in 1853
- Lady Franklin (ship), a Canadian ice-strengthened cargo vessel chartered by the Australian Antarctic Division after the 1987 scuttling of the Nella Dan
- Lady Franklin (schooner), a ship that went missing near Tasmania in 1838

== See also ==
- "Lady Franklin's Lament", an Australian folk ballad
- Lady Franklin's Revenge, a 2005 history of the exploration of the Arctic by Ken McGoogan
- Lady Franklinfjorden, a fjord in Arctic Norway
