= Lhtako Dene Nation =

- Band No. 715
- People: Dakelh
- Headquarters: Quesnel
- Province: British Columbia

Land
- Land area: 6.8 km^{2} (2.6 sq mi)

Population (2024)
- On reserve: 94
- On other land: 12
- Off reserve: 103
- Total population: 209

Government
- Chief: Clifford Lebrun
- Council: Timothy Mitchell; Raymond Aldred; Wanda Lee Aldred

Tribal Council
- Carrier-Chilcotin Tribal Council

Website
- www.lhtakodenenation.com

Lhtako Dene Nation, formerly Red Bluff First Nation is a Dakelh First Nations government located in the northern Fraser Canyon region of the Canadian province of British Columbia. It is a member of the Carrier-Chilcotin Tribal Council, which includes both Tsilhqot'in and Dakelh (Carrier) communities.

The Lhtako Dene Nation reserve community and offices are located near Quesnel.

== Chief and Councillors ==
- Chief: Clifford Lebrun

Councillor: Cindy Aldred Councillor: Denise Paul Councillor: Wanda Aldred

== Indian Reserves ==
Indian Reserves under the administration of the Lhtako Dene Nation are:

- Dragon Lake Indian Reserve No. 3, 3 miles E of Quesnel, 14.80 ha. 52°58′00″N 122°26′00″W
- Quesnel Indian Reserve No. 1, on left (E) bank of the Fraser River, 1 mile S of Quesnel, 552.70 ha. 52°58′00″N 122°29′00″W
- Rich Bar Indian Reserve No. 4, on left (E) bank of the Fraser River, 3 miles S of Quesnel, 96.40 ha. 52°56′00″N 122°29′00″W
- Sinnce-tah-lah Indian Reserve No. 2, on right (W) bank of the Fraser River, 2 miles S of Quesnel, west of Quesnel IR No. 1, 18.80 ha. 52°57′00″N 122°30′00″W

== See also ==
- Dakelh
- Carrier language
- Carrier-Chilcotin Tribal Council
- Tsilhqot'in Tribal Council
