= Dragon Lake =

Dragon Lake may refer to:

- Dragon Lake, British Columbia, an unincorporated community just south of Quesnel
- Dragon Lake Elementary School in the School District 28 Quesnel
- Drakolimni, the name of several alpine or sub-alpine lakes in the region of Epirus in northwestern Greece
- Lake Nacimiento, so called because of the dragon-like shape created by the positions of its arms
- a lake in the Longtan Park, China
