= Rich Bar =

Rich Bar may refer to:

- Rich Bar, former name of Diamondville, California
- Rich Bar, Washington
- Rich Bar, British Columbia, an unincorporated settlement near Quesnel, British Columbia
  - Rich Bar Indian Reserve No. 4, an Indian Reserve at Rich Bar, British Columbia
