= Pinnacles Provincial Park =

Provincial park in British Columbia, Canada

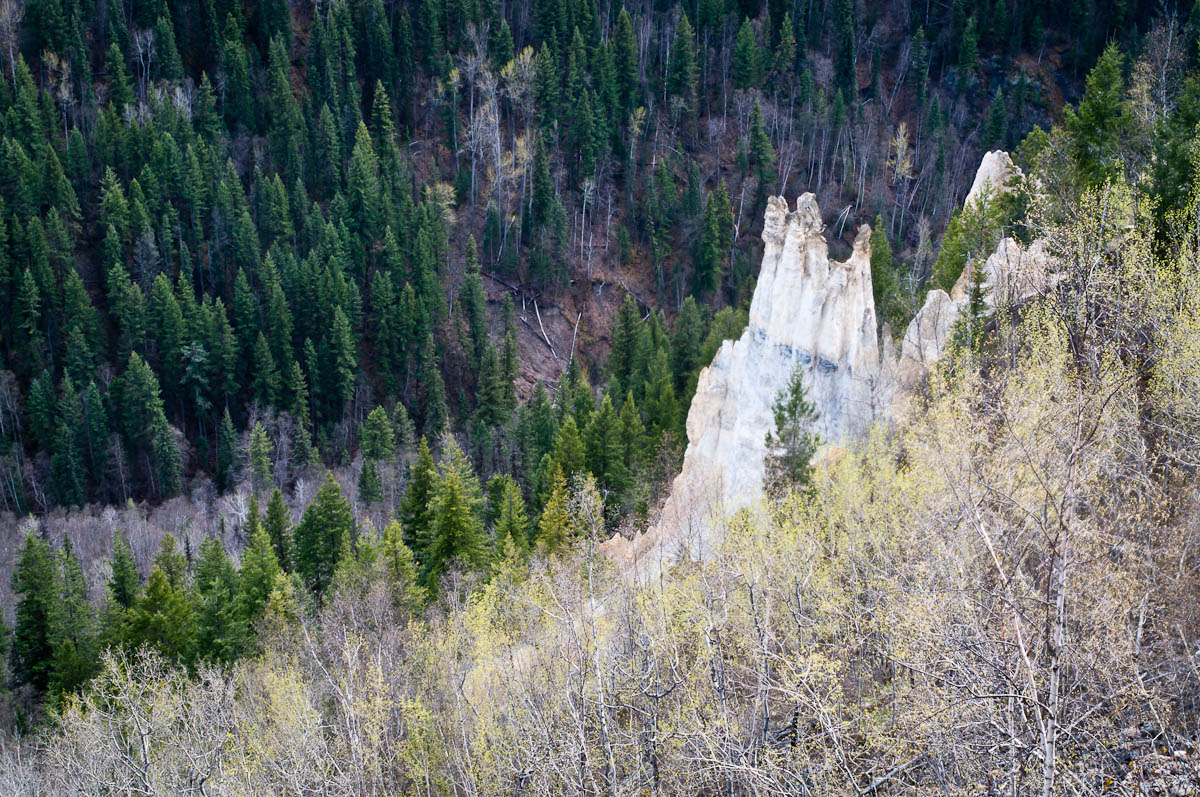
- Hoodoos in Pinnacles Provincial Park

- Location within British Columbia
- Interactive map of Pinnacles Provincial Park
- Location: Cariboo Regional District, British Columbia
- Nearest city: Quesnel
- Coordinates: 52°58′45″N 122°33′30″W
- Area: 124.39 ha (307.4 acres)
- Designation: Provincial Park
- Created: 18 September 1969
- Governing body: BC Parks
- Website: bcparks.ca/pinnacles/

Pinnacles Provincial Park is a 124-hectare provincial park located just west of Quesnel in Cariboo Regional District, British Columbia, Canada. The park protects a collection of prominent hoodoos nestled in a small forested valley overlooking the city of Quesnel.
