= Jim Marsh (ice hockey) =

Canadian ice hockey player

- Born: July 9, 1951 (age 74) Quesnel, British Columbia, Canada
- Height: 6 ft 0 in (183 cm)
- Weight: 180 lb (82 kg; 12 st 12 lb)
- Position: Defence
- Shot: Left
- Played for: Birmingham Bulls
- Playing career: 1972–1980

Jim Marsh (born September 7, 1951) is a Canadian retired professional ice hockey defenceman who played in the World Hockey Association (WHA). He played one game for the Birmingham Bulls during the 1976–77 WHA season. He also played in the American Hockey League and International Hockey League.

== Career statistics ==
=== Regular season and playoffs ===
			Regular season					Playoffs
Season	Team	League	GP	G	A	Pts	PIM	GP	G	A	Pts	PIM
1969–70	Vernon Essos	BCJHL	Statistics Unavailable
1970–71	Vernon Essos	BCJHL	60	12	34	46	91	—	—	—	—	—
1972–73	Nelson Maple Leafs	WIHL	35	4	12	16	63	—	—	—	—	—
1973–74	Tulsa Oilers	CHL	68	4	10	14	58	—	—	—	—	—
1974–75	Oklahoma City Blazers	CHL	68	2	22	24	71	5	0	2	2	4
1975–76	Syracuse Blazers	NAHL	34	1	12	13	79	8	0	3	3	19
1976–77	Birmingham Bulls	WHA	1	0	0	0	0	—	—	—	—	—
1976–77	Syracuse Blazers	NAHL	72	9	55	64	60	9	0	4	4	16
1977–78	Broome Dusters	AHL	78	2	17	19	130	—	—	—	—	—
1978–79	Broome Dusters	AHL	76	5	31	36	118	10	0	3	3	10
1979–80	Broome Dusters	AHL	5	0	1	1	0	—	—	—	—	—
1979–80	Saginaw Gears	IHL	62	4	37	41	54	7	0	3	3	22
WHA totals			1	0	0	0	0	–	–	–	–	–
