= Bob Simpson (British Columbia politician) =

Canadian politician (born 1956 or 1957)

Mayor of Quesnel
- In office November 18, 2014 – October 15, 2022
- Preceded by: Mary Sjostrom
- Succeeded by: Ron Paull

Member of the British Columbia Legislative Assembly for Cariboo North
- In office May 17, 2005 – May 14, 2013
- Preceded by: John Wilson
- Succeeded by: Coralee Oakes

Personal details
- Born: 1956 or 1957 (age 68–69) Scotland
- Party: New Democratic (2005–10); Independent (2010–)

Robert Simpson (born 1956 or 1957) is a former MLA for Cariboo North in the Canadian province of British Columbia. He was elected to the Legislative Assembly in the 2005 election.

He was a member of the British Columbia New Democratic Party. He was removed from caucus on October 7, 2010, for public dissent regarding then New Democratic Party leader Carole James, and subsequently sat in the legislature as an independent MLA.

On February 7, 2013, Simpson joined with Delta South MLA Vicki Huntington and Abbotsford South MLA John van Dongen to present a six-point agenda for democratic reform, including changes to B.C.'s electoral finance law and the Election Act.

Simpson was defeated when he ran for a third term in the Legislature in the 2013 provincial election as an independent.

Simpson announced on June 20, 2014 that he would run for Mayor of Quesnel, British Columbia where he defeated incumbent Mayor Mary Sjostrom. He then held the position until October 15, 2022, when he lost to Ron Paull.

== Electoral record ==
2013 British Columbia general election: Cariboo North
| Party | Candidate | Votes | % |
|---|---|---|---|
| Liberal | Coralee Oakes | 5,867 | 41.41 |
| Independent | Bob Simpson | 5,264 | 37.16 |
| New Democratic | Duncan Barnett | 3,036 | 21.43 |
| Total valid votes | | 14,167 | 100.00 |
| Total rejected ballots | | 81 | 0.57 |
| Turnout | | 14,248 | 59.77 |
Source: Elections BC

BC General Election 2009: Cariboo North
| Party | Candidate | Votes | % | ± | Expenditures |
|---|---|---|---|---|---|
| NDP | Bob Simpson | 7004 | 49.51 | +2.12 | $53,378 |
| Liberal | Bruce Ernst | 6501 | 45.95 | +0.40 | $138,230 |
| Green | Doug Gook | 643 | 4.54 | −0.83 | $1,550 |
| Total | | 14,148 | | | |
| Total rejected ballots | | 87 | 0.61% | | |
| Turnout | | 14,235 | 60.24% | | |

BC General Election 2005: Cariboo North
| Party | Candidate | Votes | % | ± | Expenditures |
|---|---|---|---|---|---|
| NDP | Bob Simpson | 7,353 | 47.28% | | $45,906 |
| Liberal | Steve Wallace | 7,084 | 45.55% | | $90,171 |
| Green | Douglas Gook | 835 | 5.37% | – | $1,828 |
| Marijuana | James Michael Delbarre | 281 | 1.81% | | $100 |
| Total valid votes | | 15,553 | 100% | | |
| Total rejected ballots | | 126 | 0.81% | | |
| Turnout | | 15,679 | 64.26% | | |
