= French Bar Canyon =

Coordinates: 51°13′00″N 122°09′00″W

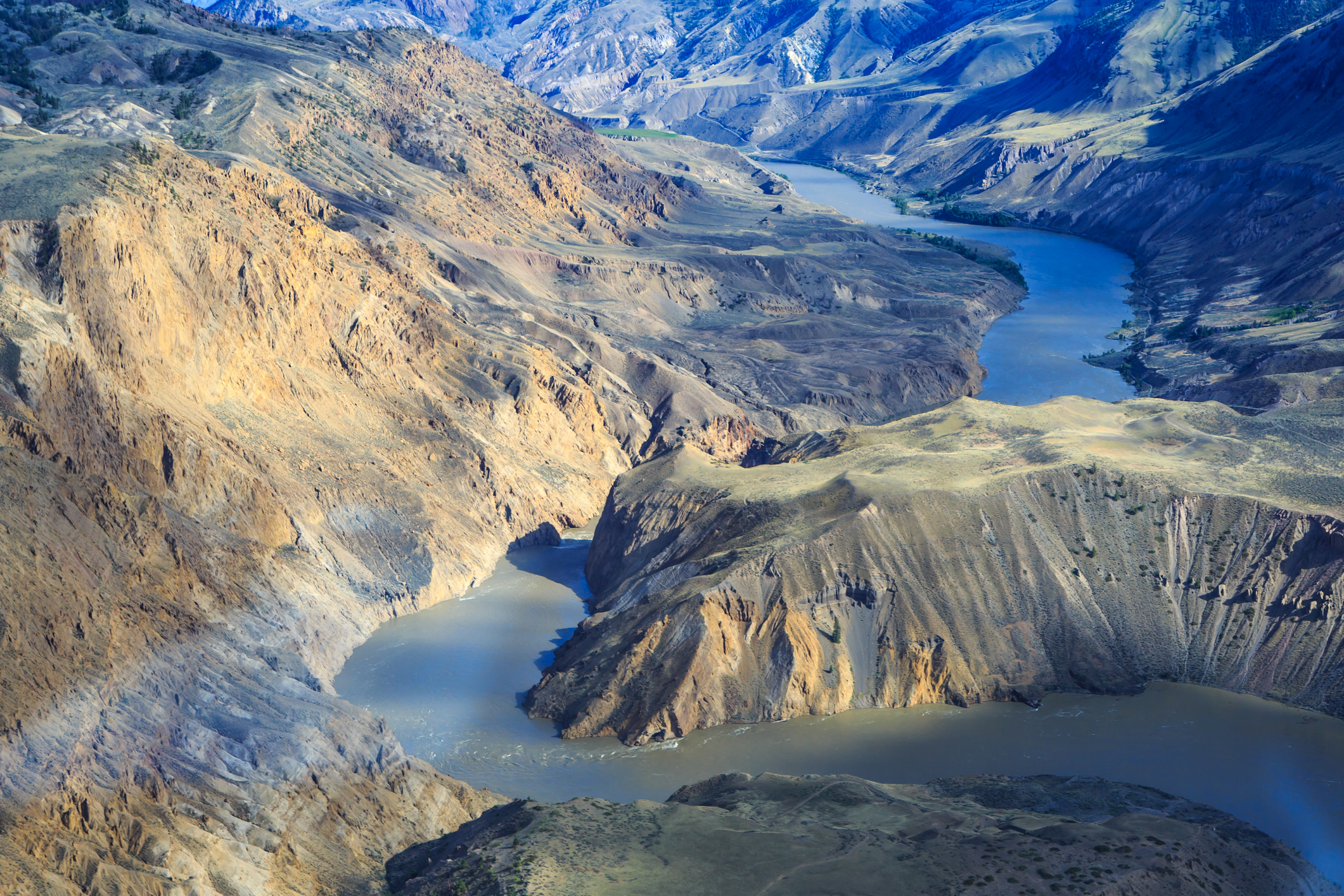
French Bar Canyon

French Bar Canyon is a canyon on the Fraser River in British Columbia, Canada, near Big Bar and Jesmond, and approximately 60 km upstream from Lillooet.

The canyon is also the site of a June 2019 landslide that blocked the passage of spawning salmon.

== See also ==
- Fraser Canyon
- List of natural features on the Fraser River
