= Ten Mile Lake Provincial Park =

Provincial park in British Columbia, Canada

- IUCN category II (national park)
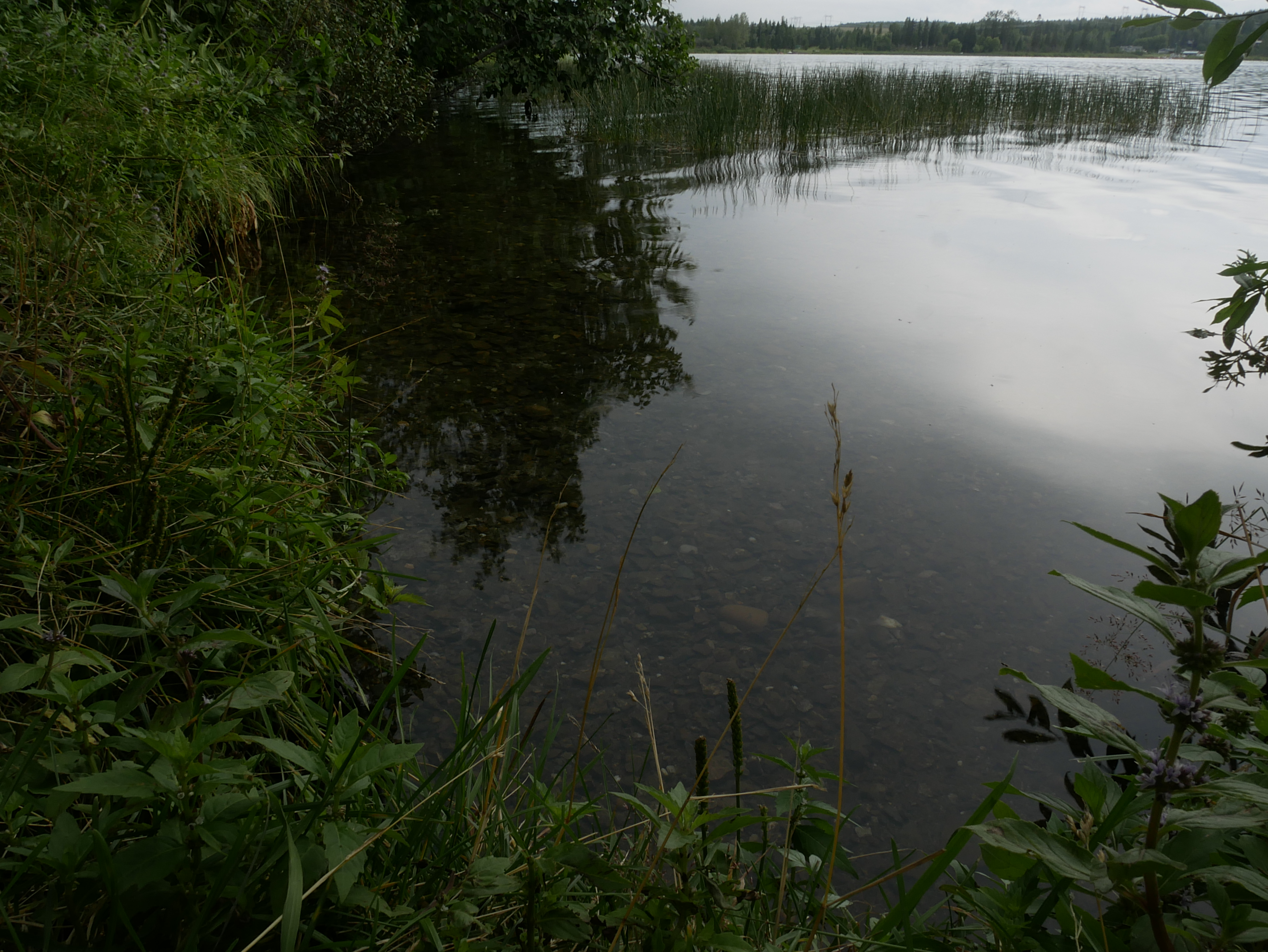
- Reflections along the shores of Ten Mile Lake

- Location within British Columbia
- Interactive map of Ten Mile Lake Provincial Park
- Location: Cariboo Land District, British Columbia, Canada
- Nearest city: Quesnel, British Columbia
- Coordinates: 53°04′00″N 122°27′00″W
- Area: 343 ha (850 acres)
- Established: 1962
- Operator: BC Parks
- Website: https://bcparks.ca/explore/parkpgs/ten_mile/

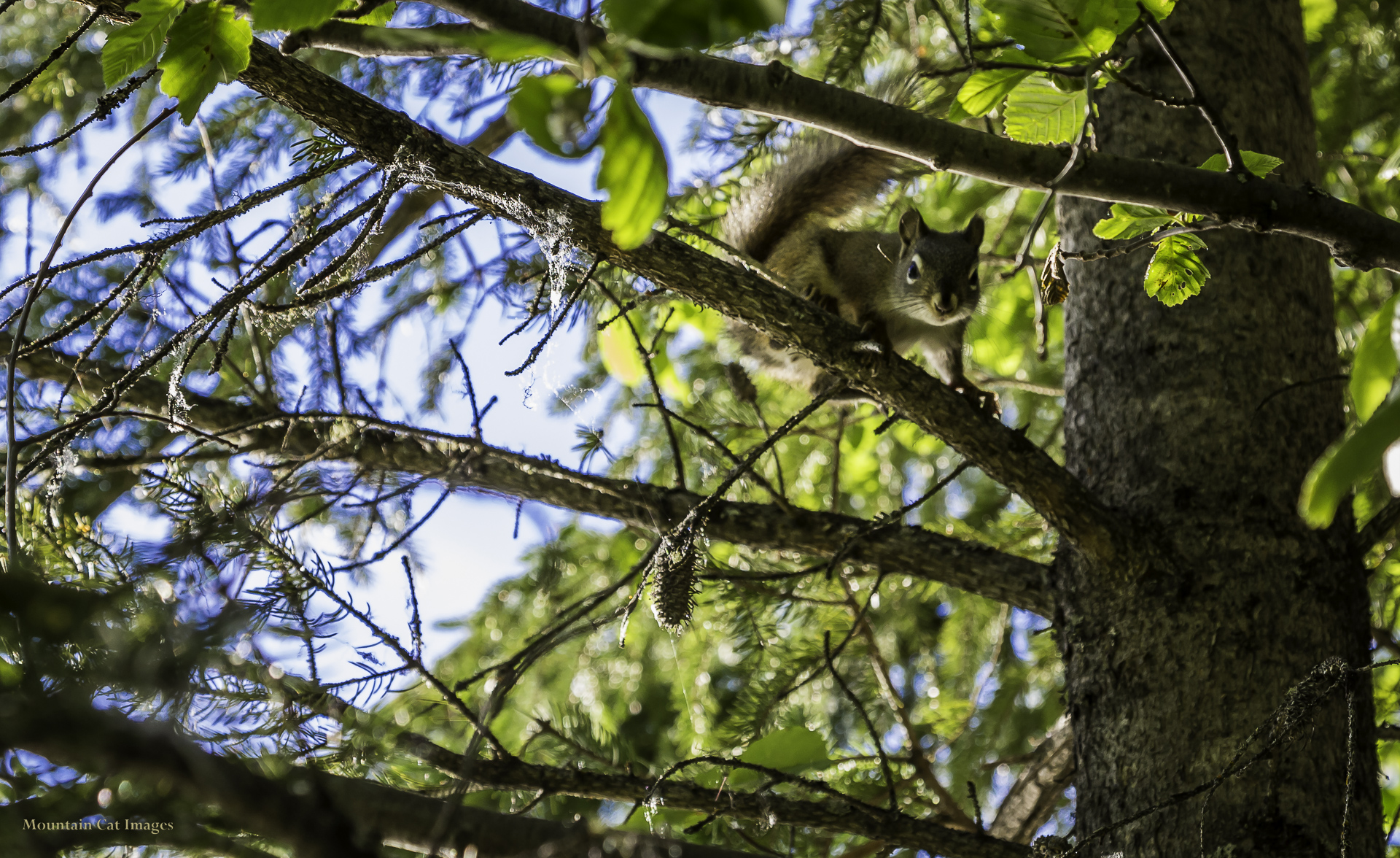
A squirrel in a tree seen in the park, 2014

Ten Mile Lake Provincial Park is a provincial park in the Cariboo Land District of British Columbia, Canada, ten miles (16 km) north of the city of Quesnel. The park is situated within the Fraser Plateau and Basin complex, in a transition area between the wetter Quesnel Highland to the east, and the dry Chilcotin Plateau to the west.

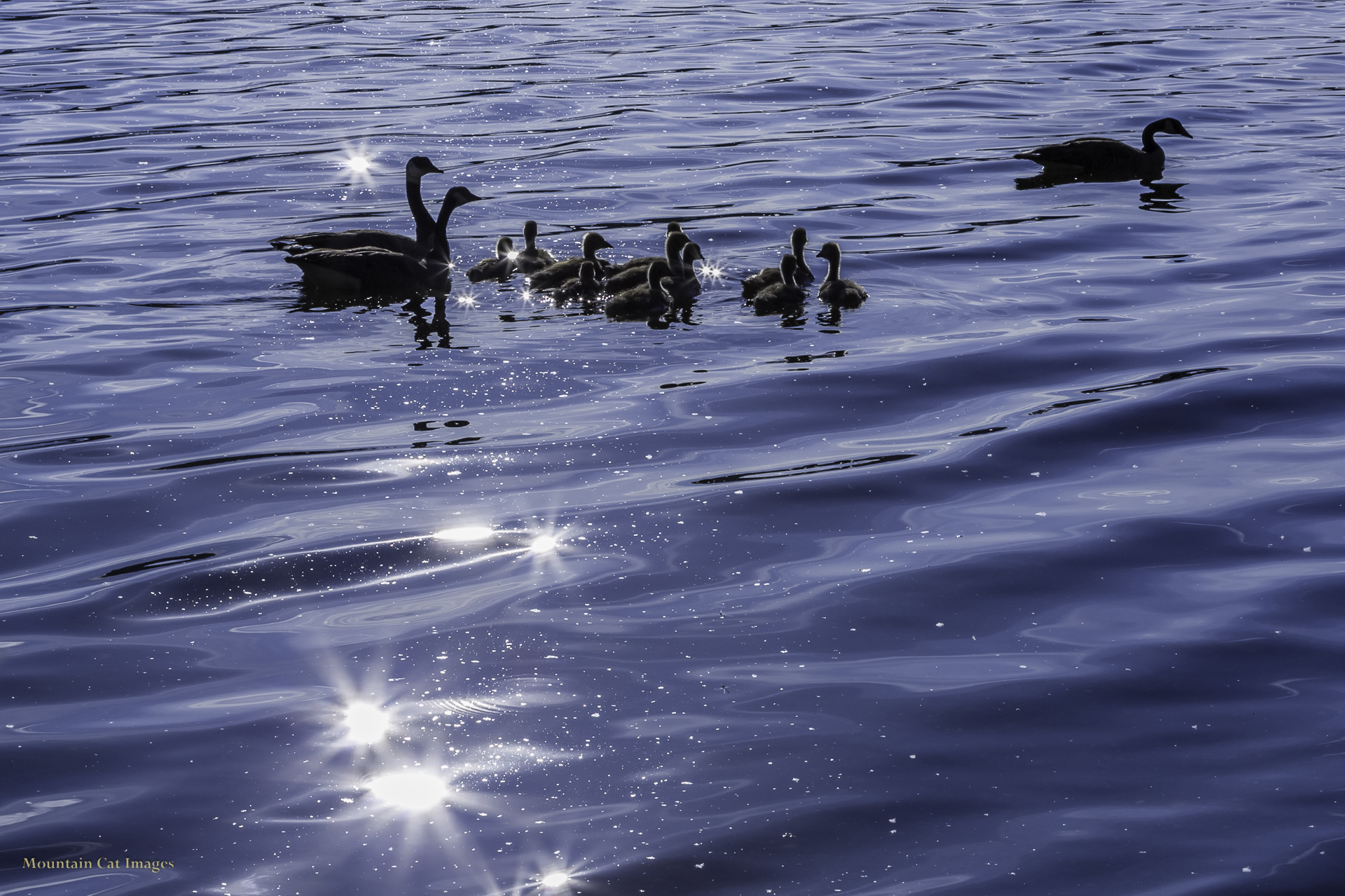
Canada geese on Ten Mile Lake, 2014

Ten Mile Lake Provincial Park is named after a Pacific Great Eastern Railway milepost placed in the area in the early 1900s.
