= Coralee Oakes =

Canadian politician (born 1972)

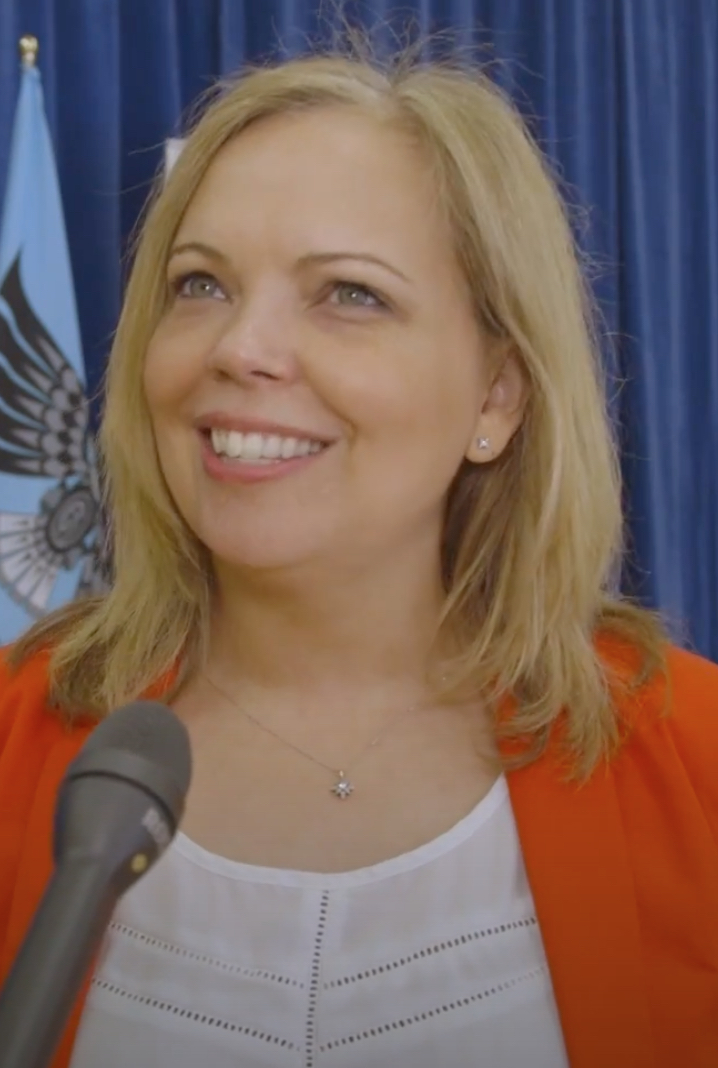
- Oakes in 2016

Mayor of Quesnel
- Incumbent
- Assumed office November 2, 2026
- Preceded by: Ron Paull

Member of the Legislative Assembly of British Columbia for Cariboo North
- In office May 14, 2013 – September 21, 2024
- Preceded by: Bob Simpson
- Succeeded by: Sheldon Clare

Minister of Community, Sport and Cultural Development of British Columbia
- In office June 7, 2013 – July 30, 2015
- Premier: Christy Clark
- Preceded by: Bill Bennett
- Succeeded by: Peter Fassbender

Personal details
- Born: 1972 (age 53–54)
- Party: Independent
- Other political affiliations: BC Liberal (until 2024)
- Profession: Politician

Coralee Ella Oakes (born 1972) is a Canadian politician who has served as mayor of Quesnel since 2026. A former member of the BC Liberal Party, she served as the member of the Legislative Assembly of British Columbia (MLA) for Cariboo North from 2013 to 2024. Oakes served in Cabinet as Minister of Community, Sport and Cultural Development, and then Minister of Small Business and Red Tape Reduction, and Minister Responsible for the Liquor Distribution Branch. She served in the provincial cabinet under Premier Christy Clark as Minister of Community, Sport and Cultural Development, Minister of Small Business and Red Tape Reduction, and Minister Responsible for the Liquor Distribution Branch.

In opposition, Oakes served as the Official Opposition critic for Small Business, Advanced Education, Skills Training and Sport, and Post-Secondary Education. In 2022, she was elected by her colleagues to chair the BC Liberal Party caucus.

Before entering provincial politics, Oakes served two terms on Quesnel City Council and was the executive director of the Quesnel and District Chamber of Commerce, a position she had held since 1999. In 2007, she was appointed by the provincial government to the Small Business Roundtable to represent rural small businesses. This led to her appointment to the Minister's Council on Tourism in 2009. She also served as president of the British Columbia Chamber Executives and as a director of the BC Chamber of Commerce, Canadian Chamber of Commerce Executives, Cariboo Chilcotin Tourism Association, and several local non-profit organizations.

On September 12, 2024, Oakes announced that she would run as an independent candidate in Prince George-North Cariboo in the 2024 provincial election. She was defeated by Sheldon Clare of the Conservative Party of British Columbia.

== Electoral record ==
2024 British Columbia general election: Prince George-North Cariboo
Party	Candidate	Votes	%	±%	Expenditures
Conservative	Sheldon Clare	11,430	56.82	+49.6	$27,477.42
Independent	Coralee Oakes	4,394	21.84	-30.7	$7,335.00
New Democratic	Denice Bardua	3,426	17.03	-14.3	$4,917.96
Green	Randy Thompson	866	4.31	-4.0	$1,650.44
Total valid votes/expense limit		20,116	99.91	–	$71,700.08
Total rejected ballots		18	0.09	–	
Turnout		20,134	59.97	–	
Registered voters		33,572			
Conservative notional gain from BC United		Swing		+40.1 (Note: Swing against BC United incumbent Coralee Oakes, standing for re-election as an independent candidate.)	
Source: Elections BC

2020 British Columbia general election: Cariboo North
Party	Candidate	Votes	%	±%	Expenditures
Liberal	Coralee Oakes	5,367	48.42	−2.63	$16,017.08
New Democratic	Scott Elliott	3,809	34.36	−1.21	$890.10
Conservative	Kyle Townsend	1,201	10.84	+4.84	$571.20
Green	Douglas Gook	707	6.38	−1.00	$237.95
Total valid votes		11,084	100.00	–	
Total rejected ballots					
Turnout					
Registered voters					
Source: Elections BC

2017 British Columbia general election: Cariboo North
Party	Candidate	Votes	%	±%	Expenditures
Liberal	Coralee Oakes	6,359	51.05	+9.64	$56,018
New Democratic	Scott Elliott	4,430	35.57	+14.14	$55,108
Green	Richard Edward Jaques	919	7.38	–	$285
Conservative	Tony Goulet	747	6.00	–	$816
Total valid votes		12,455	100.00		
Total rejected ballots		58	0.46		
Turnout		12,513	60.94		
Source: Elections BC

2013 British Columbia general election: Cariboo North
Party	Candidate	Votes	%
Liberal	Coralee Oakes	5,867	41.41
Independent	Bob Simpson	5,264	37.16
New Democratic	Duncan Barnett	3,036	21.43
Total valid votes		14,167	100.00
Total rejected ballots		81	0.57
Turnout		14,248	59.77
Source: Elections BC
