= Cariboo North =

Defunct provincial electoral district in British Columbia, Canada

British Columbia electoral district
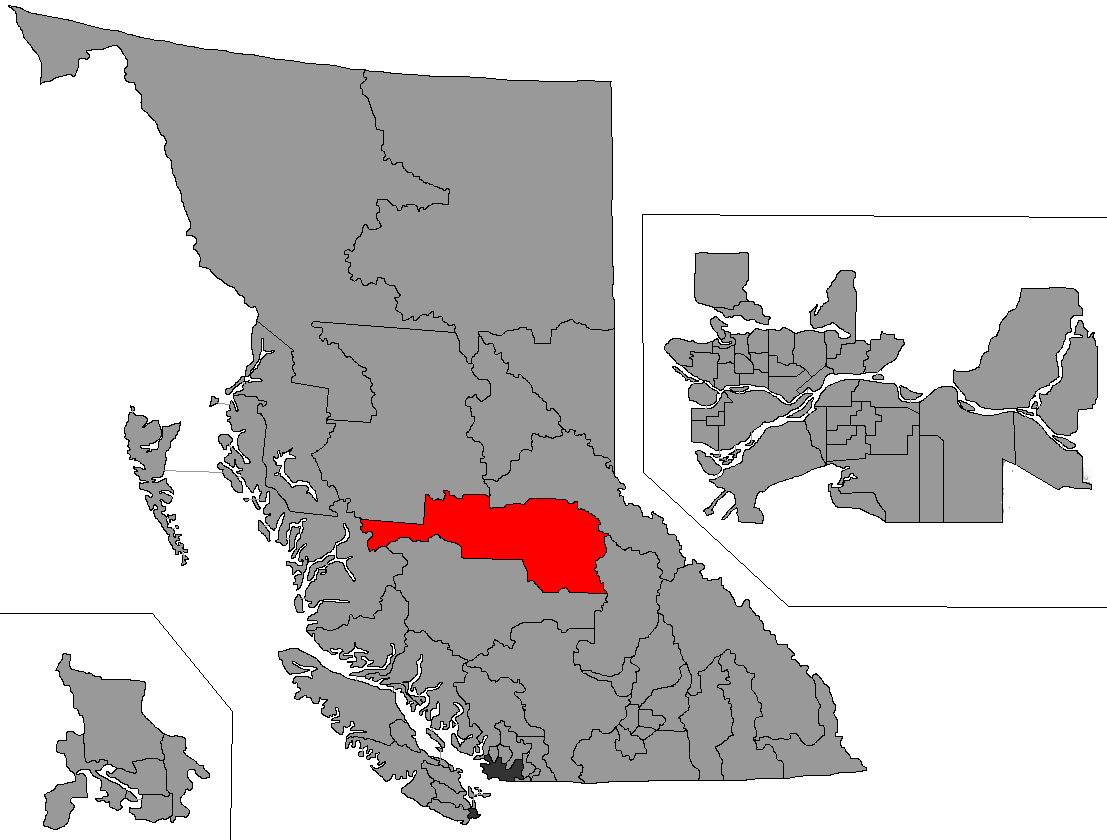

Defunct provincial electoral district
- Legislature: Legislative Assembly of British Columbia
- District created: 1990
- First contested: 1991
- Last contested: 2020

Cariboo North is a former provincial electoral district for the Legislative Assembly of British Columbia, Canada. It was created by 1990 legislation dividing the previous two-member district of Cariboo, which came into effect for the 1991 BC election.

Under the 2021 British Columbia electoral redistribution which took effect in the 2024 BC election, the district was eliminated. Most of the riding was replaced by Prince George-North Cariboo, a larger electoral district extending into the southern suburbs of Prince George.

== Geography ==
As of the 2020 provincial election, Cariboo North comprises the northern portion of the Cariboo Regional District. It is located in central British Columbia. Communities in the electoral district consist of Quesnel and Wells.

== Demographics ==
Population, 2001	37,209
Population change, 1996–2001	−0.8%
Area (km^{2})	33,861.55
Population density	1.1

== Members of the Legislative Assembly ==
Cariboo North
Assembly	Years	Member	Party
Riding created from Cariboo
35th	1991–1996	Frank Garden	New Democratic
36th	1996–2001	John Wilson	Liberal
37th	2001–2005	John Wilson	Liberal
38th	2005–2009	Bob Simpson	New Democratic
39th	2009–2010	Bob Simpson	New Democratic
39th	2010–2013	Bob Simpson	Independent
40th	2013–2017	Coralee Oakes	Liberal
41st	2017–2020	Coralee Oakes	Liberal
42nd	2020–2023	Coralee Oakes	Liberal
42nd	2023–2024	Coralee Oakes	BC United
Riding dissolved into Prince George-North Cariboo

== Electoral history ==
2020 British Columbia general election
Party	Candidate	Votes	%	±%	Expenditures
Liberal	Coralee Oakes	5,367	48.42	−2.63	$16,017.08
New Democratic	Scott Elliott	3,809	34.36	−1.21	$890.10
Conservative	Kyle Townsend	1,201	10.84	+4.84	$571.20
Green	Douglas Gook	707	6.38	−1.00	$237.95
Total valid votes		11,084	100.00	–	
Total rejected ballots					
Turnout					
Registered voters					
Source: Elections BC

2017 British Columbia general election
Party	Candidate	Votes	%	±%	Expenditures
Liberal	Coralee Oakes	6,359	51.05	+9.64	$56,018
New Democratic	Scott Elliott	4,430	35.57	+14.14	$55,108
Green	Richard Edward Jaques	919	7.38	–	$285
Conservative	Tony Goulet	747	6.00	–	$816
Total valid votes		12,455	100.00		
Total rejected ballots		58	0.46		
Turnout		12,513	60.94		
Source: Elections BC

2013 British Columbia general election
Party	Candidate	Votes	%
Liberal	Coralee Oakes	5,867	41.41
Independent	Bob Simpson	5,264	37.16
New Democratic	Duncan Barnett	3,036	21.43
Total valid votes		14,167	100.00
Total rejected ballots		81	0.57
Turnout		14,248	59.77
Source: Elections BC

BC General Election 2009: Cariboo North
Party	Candidate	Votes	%	±	Expenditures
NDP	Bob Simpson	7004	49.51	+2.12	$53,378
Liberal	Bruce Ernst	6501	45.95	+0.40	$138,230
Green	Doug Gook	643	4.54	−0.83	$1,550
Total		14,148			
Total rejected ballots		87	0.61%		
Turnout		14,235	60.24%		

2009 British Columbia electoral reform referendum
Side	Votes	%
FPTP	9,222	66.73%
BC-STV	4,598	33.27%

BC General Election 2005: Cariboo North
Party	Candidate	Votes	%	±	Expenditures
NDP	Bob Simpson	7,353	47.28%		$45,906
Liberal	Steve Wallace	7,084	45.55%		$90,171
Green	Douglas Gook	835	5.37%	–	$1,828
Marijuana	James Michael Delbarre	281	1.81%		$100
Total valid votes		15,553	100%		
Total rejected ballots		126	0.81%		
Turnout		15,679	64.26%		

2005 British Columbia electoral reform referendum
Side	Votes	%
Yes	8,923	58.57%
No	6,311	41.43%

BC General Election 2001: Cariboo North
Party	Candidate	Votes	%	±	Expenditures
Liberal	John Wilson	10,044	64.97%		$40,510
NDP	Frank Garden	2,732	17.67%		$13,716
Independent	Kim McIvor	727	4.70%		$3,578
Green	Douglas Norman Gook	712	4.61%	–	$707
Marijuana	Stephen Payne	509	3.29%		$694
Unity	Steven A. McBeth	420	2.72%		$392
All Nations	Tony Goulet	292	1.89%	–	$661
People's Front	Al "Ace" Charlebois	24	0.15%		
Total valid votes		15,460	100.00%		
Total rejected ballots		76	0.49%		
Turnout		15,536	72.46%		

BC General Election 1996: Cariboo North
Party	Candidate	Votes	%	±	Expenditures
Liberal	John Wilson	5,533	40.87%		$44,845
NDP	Frank Garden	5,180	38.26%		$36,452
Reform	Robert Eyford	2,561	18.92%	$14,893	
Green	Phillip Mencero	168	1.24%	$775	
Libertarian	Ric Steines	97	0.72%		
Total valid votes		13,539			
Total rejected ballots		63	0.46%		
Turnout		13,602	70.05%		

BC General Election 1991: Cariboo North
Party	Candidate	Votes	%	±	Expenditures
NDP	Frank Garden	4,919	39.10%		$28,365
Social Credit	Michael L. Pearce	4,205	33.42%	–	$47,974
Liberal	Darwin L. Netzel	2,317	18.41%		$1,196
Reform	Elizabeth Betsy Van Halderen	1,141	9.07%		$15,539
Total valid votes		12,582	100.00%		
Total rejected ballots		280	2.18%		
Turnout		12,862	73.15%		

== See also ==
- List of British Columbia provincial electoral districts
- Canadian provincial electoral districts
