= Dragon Mountain Provincial Park =

Provincial park in British Columbia, Canada

- IUCN category II (national park)
- Location within British Columbia Location within Canada
- Interactive map of Dragon Mountain Provincial Park
- Location: Cariboo, British Columbia, Canada
- Nearest city: Dragon Lake
- Coordinates: 52°52′59″N 122°21′35″W
- Area: 1,773 hectares (17.73 km^{2})
- Elevation: 877 metres (2,877 ft)
- Established: March 6, 2013; 13 years ago
- Governing body: BC Parks

Dragon Mountain Provincial Park is a provincial park in British Columbia, Canada. It is located between Fraser River and Quesnel River in northern Cariboo, about 11 kilometers southeast of Dragon Lake, at an elevation of 877 meters. It was established on March 6, 2013, to protect local landscape and mule deer population.
