= Red Bluff, British Columbia =

Red Bluff
- Location of Red Bluff in British Columbia
- Coordinates: 52°58′00″N 122°28′00″W
- Country: Canada
- Province: British Columbia
- Time zone: UTC−07:00 (PT)
- Area codes: 250, 778

Red Bluff is an unincorporated settlement and adjoining Indian Reserve community located just south of Quesnel, British Columbia, Canada. The community includes Quesnel Indian Reserve No. 1, one of the reserves of the Red Bluff First Nation and is generally also referred to as Red Bluff.

== See also ==
- Rich Bar, British Columbia
- Dragon Lake, British Columbia
