= Hallis Lake Cross Country Skiing Facility =

Hallis Lake Cross Country Skiing Facility Hallis Lake
- Nickname: Hallis
- Location of Hallis Lake Hallis Lake Cross Country Skiing Facility (Canada)
- Coordinates: 52°55′30″N 122°20′42″W
- Country: Canada
- Established: 1995
- Website: caribooski.ca

Hallis Lake Cross Country Skiing Facility is a 75 kilometer network of trails in Quesnel, British Columbia maintained by the Cariboo Ski-Touring club. The trails are home to winter activities such as cross-country skiing and snowshoeing.

== History ==
The facility was opened in 1995. In 1998, the 3,000 square foot lodge was opened to the public.

In 2006, Northern Development Initiative Trust granted $36,667 to Cariboo Ski Touring Club to go toward expansion of the trails.

In 2022, Hallis Lake hosted the BC Cup #3 Biathlon.
