= Frank Garden =

Canadian politician (1933-2007)

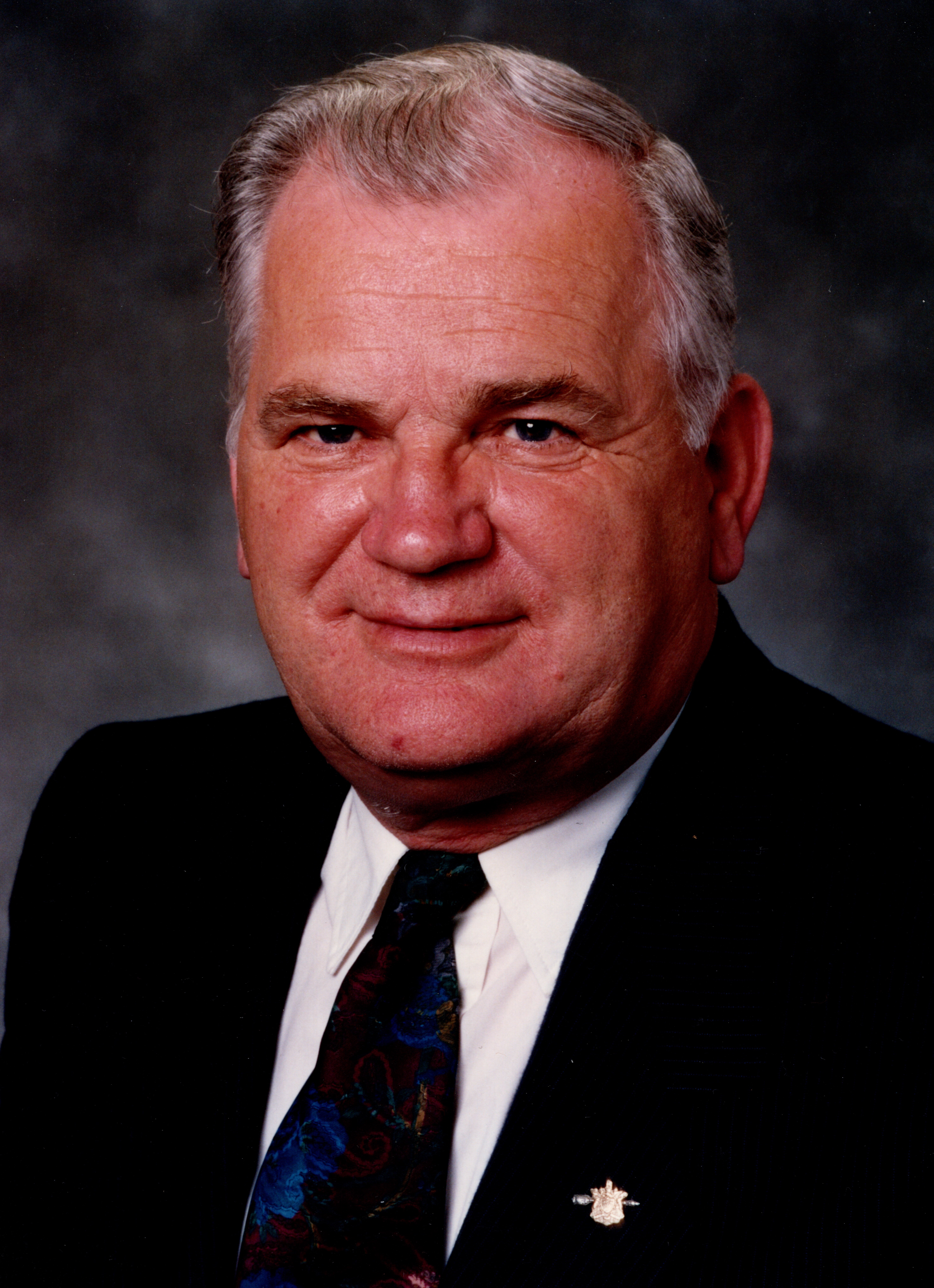

MLA for Cariboo North
- In office 1991–1996
- Succeeded by: John Wilson

Personal details
- Born: March 4, 1933 Arbroath, Scotland
- Died: October 13, 2007 (aged 74) Comox, British Columbia
- Party: British Columbia New Democratic Party

Frank Bissett Garden (March 4, 1933 – October 13, 2007) was a Canadian politician. He served in the Legislative Assembly of British Columbia from 1991 to 1996, as a NDP member for the constituency of Cariboo North. He was an unsuccessful candidate in both the 1996 and 2001 provincial elections. Prior to his election in 1991, he was a bricklayer. He died in 2007 from colon cancer.
