= China Bar =

- Interactive map of China Bar

Restaurant information
- Established: 1996
- Location: Australia
- Website: https://www.chinabar.com.au/

China Bar is an Australian-Chinese restaurant chain. It primarily operates in the state of Victoria. Some locations operate as 24 hour locations.

China Bar was founded in 1996, with its flagship store operating on the corner of Russell Street and Lonsdale Street in Melbourne. It has 29 restaurants under 6 brands offering different types of Asian cuisine. Of those 29, two operate in Western Australia and one operates in the Northern Territory. The Burwood location is the largest Asian buffet restaurant in Melbourne. There are multiple CBD locations. Its restaurants are also located within suburban shopping centres and strips.

The chain was heavily affected by the 2020 COVID pandemic.

== Controversies ==
In 2015, China Bar's flagship Melbourne CBD location burned down, causing $250,000 AUD in damage and causing the neighbouring restaurant Stalactites to close. In 2021, the Epping Pty Ltd chain was fined ~$300,000 AUD for underpaying its migrant workers and falsifying records.

In 2020, the brother of the restaurant's founder, who was also a franchisee, was murdered. In 2023, a man was acquitted of the murder after being put on trial.
