= Rich Bar, British Columbia =

Rich Bar
- Location of Rich Bar in British Columbia
- Coordinates: 52°55′00″N 122°27′00″W
- Country: Canada
- Province: British Columbia
- Time zone: UTC−07:00 (PT)
- Area codes: 250, 778

Rich Bar is an unincorporated settlement and adjoining Indian Reserve community located just south of Quesnel, British Columbia, Canada. The locality includes Rich Bar Indian Reserve No. 4, one of the reserves of the Red Bluff First Nation.

== See also ==
- Red Bluff, British Columbia
- Dragon Lake, British Columbia
