= Sheldon Clare =

Canadian politician

Sheldon Clare MLA

Opposition House Leader of British Columbia
- In office June 29, 2026 – November 20, 2026
- Leader: Kerry-Lynne Findlay; Lorne Doerkson
- Preceded by: Áʼa꞉líya Warbus
- Succeeded by: TBD

Member of the British Columbia Legislative Assembly for Prince George-North Cariboo
- Incumbent
- Assumed office October 19, 2024
- Preceded by: Coralee Oakes

Personal details
- Party: BC Conservatives

Sheldon Clare MLA is a Canadian politician who has served as a member of the Legislative Assembly of British Columbia (MLA) representing the electoral district of Prince George-North Cariboo since 2024. A member of the Conservative Party, he has served as the Opposition House Leader in the legislature since 2026.

== Early life and career ==
Clare was born and raised in Prince George, British Columbia. He currently resides there as a father to two daughters, Elise and Danielle. He has a Bachelor of Arts degree in International Relations from the University of British Columbia and his passion for military history led to achieve cum laude honors in his Master of Arts degree from Norwich University, a military college in Vermont.

Since 1993, Clare has been a part of the College of New Caledonia (CNC) as a history instructor and as a contract negotiator for 12 years. During his time in the CNC he was the Chair of the provincial Bargaining Co-ordination Committee for six terms. He also served on the CNC Board of Governors.

As a reserve army officer, Clare dedicated over seven years to teaching cadets, and his advocacy led to the establishment of a reserve infantry unit in Prince George, British Columbia. His military leadership also extends to community organizations as he has served two terms as president of the Royal Canadian Legion Branch 43 in Prince George and still holds the position of Legion Chair. He served as the national president of Canada's National Firearms Association (NFA) from 2010-2021, where he advocated for responsible firearms ownership and represented NFA at the World Forum on Shooting Activities' executive meeting. He is also a past multi-term president and current director at large of the Prince George Rod and Gun Club.

Outside of his professional careers, Clare has a passion for music and has been a piper who has played with his local band since his teenage years. He also loves the outdoors and has interests in hunting, shooting, and downhill and cross-country skiing. His dedication to sports also goes beyond participation as he is a certified Biathlon Canada Technical Delegate and a trained coach, serving on the board of Biathlon BC. Other activities he enjoys includes caving, ice climbing, and mountaineering. These commitments to outdoor pursuits is demonstrated by his three-term chairmanship for the Alpine Club of Canada's Prince George Section. He was also a key organizer or the rejuvenated Northern Hardware Canoe Race from 2015-2019, preserving local traditions.

== Political career ==
On October 27, 2023, Clare was nominated as the Conservative Party of BC's candidate for Prince George-North Cariboo in the 2024 BC provincial election. He went on to win a seat in the Legislative Assembly of BC with 56.8% of the votes unseating BC United incumbent Coralee Oakes, who ran as an independent following the collapse of her former party.

Clare was named deputy whip of the Conservative Party of BC caucus on November 20. Clare noted the building of the North-South Interconnector, and reducing delays in the permitting process in relation to resource extraction and fire supply while respecting environmental and local concerns as his major priorities for his riding of Prince George-North Cariboo. More generally, Clare has expressed his 2025 key priorities to include transportation and repairing several roads, healthcare worker recruitment, palliative care fees and emergency room availability, economy and jobs, and agriculture.

Clare briefly ran to be leader of the Conservative Party of BC in 2026. He announced his campaign on January 28th, but suspended it a month later after the leadership application forms he submitted to the party were found to have a high proportion of signatures from people who were not current party members. Clare became a prominent supporter of party leader Kerry-Lynne Findlay, endorsing her after suspending his campaign and being named as her House Leader after her victory. Clare expressed sadness following her resignation in September, laying blame for her departure on former caucus members who had left or been removed for pursuing their own interests.

Clare faced controversy after messages in a BC Conservative party chatroom about municipal elections were made public in September 2026 in which he suggested 'a good number' of candidates 'need hanging'. In a media statement, Clare said the comment was made in jest and was not intended as a threat or to encourage violence, apologizing to anyone who took offense and saying he should have chosen his words more carefully.

== Electoral history ==
2026 British Columbia general election: Prince George-North Cariboo
Party	Candidate	Votes	%	±%	Expenditures
Conservative	Sheldon Clare	12,437	69.74		
New Democratic	Denice Bardua	3,637	20.39		
Green	Randy Thompson	1,714	9.61		
Total valid votes		17,788	99.75		
Total rejected ballots		45	0.25		
Turnout					
Registered voters					
Conservative hold		Swing		+8.28	
Source: Elections BC

2024 British Columbia general election: Prince George-North Cariboo
Party	Candidate	Votes	%	±%	Expenditures
Conservative	Sheldon Clare	11,430	56.82	+49.6	$27,477.42
Independent	Coralee Oakes	4,394	21.84	-30.7	$7,335.00
New Democratic	Denice Bardua	3,426	17.03	-14.3	$4,917.96
Green	Randy Thompson	866	4.31	-4.0	$1,650.44
Total valid votes/expense limit		20,116	99.91	–	$71,700.08
Total rejected ballots		18	0.09	–	
Turnout		20,134	59.97	–	
Registered voters		33,572			
Conservative notional gain from BC United		Swing		+40.1 (Note: Swing against BC United incumbent Coralee Oakes, standing for re-election as an independent candidate.)	
Source: Elections BC

2015 Canadian federal election: Cariboo—Prince George
Party	Candidate	Votes	%	±%	Expenditures
Conservative	Todd Doherty	19,688	36.64	–19.62	$70,428.14
Liberal	Tracy Calogheros	16,921	31.49	+26.43	$28,272.16
New Democratic	Trent Derrick	13,879	25.83	–4.28	$57,795.93
Green	Richard Edward Jaques	1,860	3.46	–2.72	$2,214.20
Independent	Sheldon Clare	657	1.22	–	$13,871.81
No affiliation	Gordie Campbell	402	0.75	–	none listed
Christian Heritage	Adam De Kroon	327	0.61	–	$2,663.87
Total valid votes/expense limit		53,734	99.60	–	$265,082.81
Total rejected ballots		216	0.40	+0.01	
Turnout		53,950	67.85	+10.52	
Eligible voters		79,517			
Conservative hold		Swing		–23.02	
Source: Elections Canada

== See also ==
- 43rd Parliament of British Columbia
