= Quesnel, British Columbia =

Quesnel
- City
- City of Quesnel
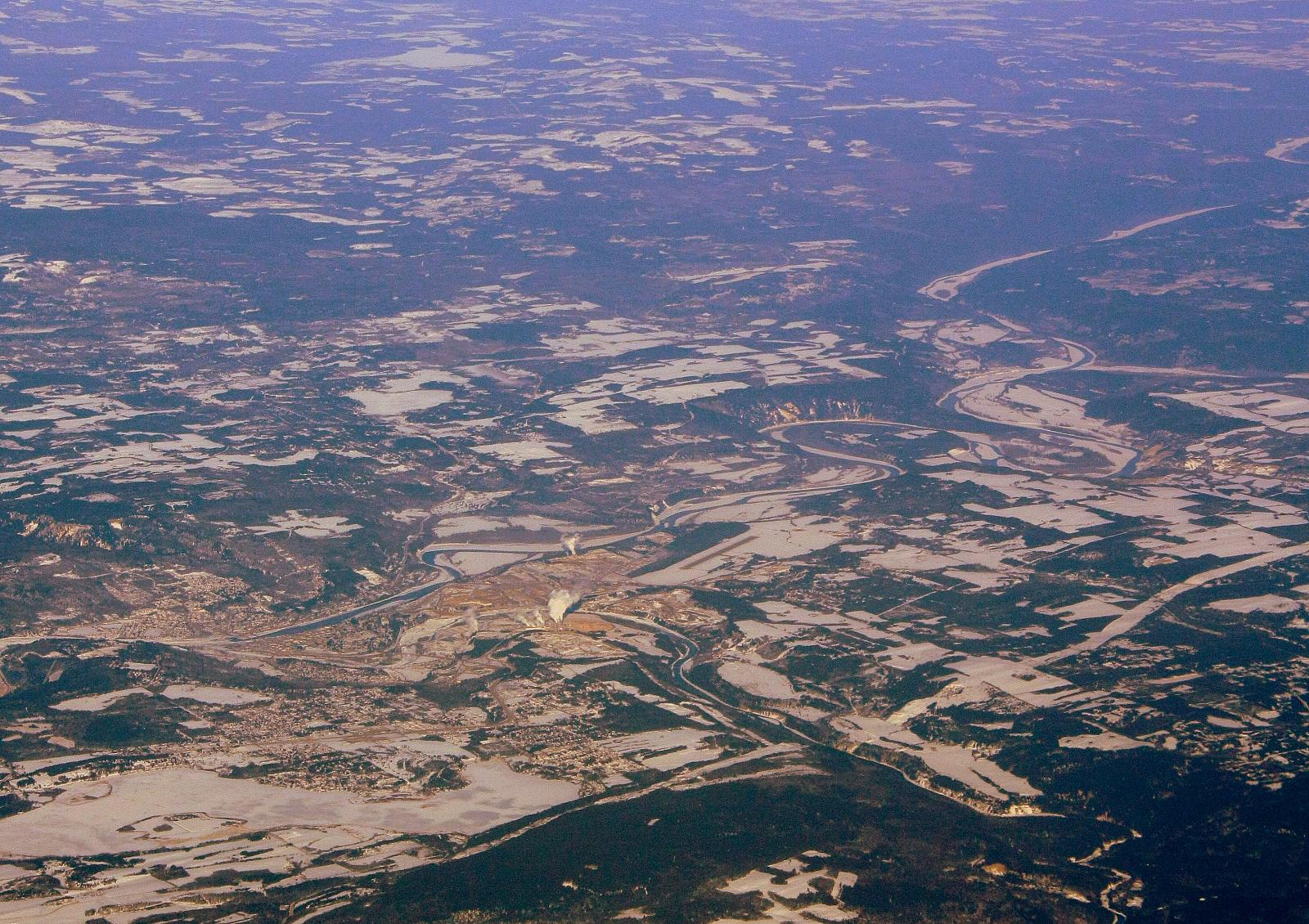
- Aerial view of Quesnel in 2009

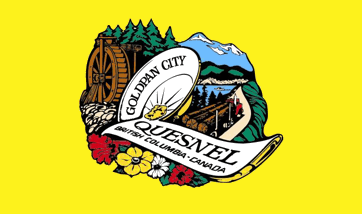
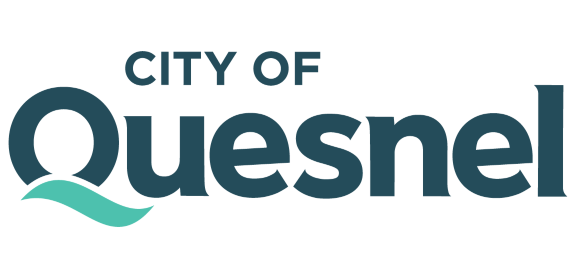
- Flag
- Motto: "It's in our nature"
- Location of Quesnel in British Columbia
- Coordinates: 52°58′47″N 122°29′37″W
- Country: Canada
- Province: British Columbia
- Region: North Cariboo
- Regional district: Cariboo Regional District
- Founded: 1861
- Incorporated as village: 1928
- Incorporated as town: 1958
- Incorporated as city: 1981

Government
  - Governing body: Quesnel City Council
  - Mayor: Coralee Oakes
  - MP: Todd Doherty (CPC)
  - MLA: Sheldon Clare (CPBC)

Area (2021)
  - Land: 35.5 km^{2} (13.7 sq mi)
  - Population centre: 25.23 km^{2} (9.74 sq mi)
  - Census agglomeration: 21,708.62 km^{2} (8,381.75 sq mi)
- Elevation at Quesnel Airport: 545 m (1,788 ft)

Population (2021)
  - Total: 9,889
  - Density: 279.8/km^{2} (725/sq mi)
  - Population centre: 12,110
  - Population centre density: 480/km^{2} (1,200/sq mi)
  - Census agglomeration: 23,113
  - Census agglomeration density: 1.1/km^{2} (2.8/sq mi)
- Time zone: UTC−07:00 (PT)
- Forward sortation area: V2J
- Area codes: 250, 778, 236, 672
- Highways: Highway 97; Highway 26
- Waterways: Fraser River, Quesnel River
- Website: quesnel.ca

Quesnel (/kwəˈnɛl/) is a city in the Cariboo Regional District of British Columbia, Canada. Located nearly evenly between the cities of Prince George and Williams Lake, it is on the main route to northern British Columbia and the Yukon. Quesnel is located at the confluence of the Fraser River and Quesnel River. As of 2021, the Quesnel census agglomeration had a population of 23,113 making it one of the largest urban centres between Prince George and Kamloops.

Quesnel is a sister city to Shiraoi, Japan. Quesnel hosted the 2000 BC Winter Games, a biennial provincial amateur sports competition. To the east of Quesnel is Wells, Barkerville, and Bowron Lake Provincial Park, a popular canoeing destination in the Cariboo Mountains.

== History ==
Long before the arrival of prospectors during the Cariboo Gold Rush of 1862, the First Nations peoples, the Dakelh or Southern Carrier, lived off the land around Quesnel, occupying the area from the Bowron Lakes in the east to the upper Blackwater River and Dean River in the west. The Southern Carrier Nation were known among themselves as ‘Uda Ukelh’, meaning ‘people who travel by boat on water early in the morning’.

The name "Quesnel" is derived from Jules-Maurice Quesnel, who accompanied Simon Fraser on his journey to the Pacific Ocean. Quesnel came to be called 'Quesnelle Mouth' to distinguish it from Quesnel Forks, 97 km (60 mi) up river. In 1870, it was shortened to Quesnelle and by 1900, it was spelled the way it is now. Quesnel is located along the gold mining trail known as the Cariboo Wagon Road and supplied nearby Barkerville, the commercial centre of the Cariboo Gold Rush. It also marks one end of the Alexander MacKenzie Heritage Trail.

Because of its location on the Fraser River, it was also an important landing for sternwheelers from 1862 to 1886 and then, from 1909 until 1921. The last sternwheeler on the upper Fraser was Quesnel's own namesake craft, and home town product, the Quesnel.

In 1891, the subdistrict of Quesnel had a population of 706. Quesnel was incorporated in 1928.

== Geography and climate ==
=== Climate ===
Considering it is located inland and around the 53rd parallel north, Quesnel's humid continental climate (Dfb) is mild by Canadian standards, being subject to marine air flows from the Pacific. Overnight lows are still cool even in summer, but daytime temperatures average above 24 °C (75 °F) in that season according to Environment and Climate Change Canada.

The highest temperature ever recorded in Quesnel was 41.7 °C (107.1 °F) on 29 June 2021. The coldest temperature ever recorded was −46.7 °C (−52.1 °F) on 31 December 1927 and 17 January 1950.

Climate data for Quesnel (Quesnel Airport) Climate ID: 1096630; coordinates 53°01′34″N 122°30′36″W; elevation: 545.0 m (1,788.1 ft); 1991–2020 normals, extremes 1892–present
Month	Jan	Feb	Mar	Apr	May	Jun	Jul	Aug	Sep	Oct	Nov	Dec	Year
Record high humidex	13.8	15.0	21.8	30.8	36.6	36.0	41.9	36.8	37.0	27.1	16.6	11.7	41.9
Record high °C (°F)	13.9 (57.0)	15.1 (59.2)	22.3 (72.1)	31.0 (87.8)	36.5 (97.7)	41.7 (107.1)	36.7 (98.1)	36.2 (97.2)	36.1 (97.0)	26.8 (80.2)	17.2 (63.0)	12.2 (54.0)	41.7 (107.1)
Mean daily maximum °C (°F)	−2.9 (26.8)	1.3 (34.3)	7.3 (45.1)	13.5 (56.3)	18.4 (65.1)	21.7 (71.1)	24.1 (75.4)	24.1 (75.4)	18.5 (65.3)	10.8 (51.4)	2.1 (35.8)	−2.3 (27.9)	11.4 (52.5)
Daily mean °C (°F)	−6.9 (19.6)	−3.6 (25.5)	1.3 (34.3)	6.4 (43.5)	11.1 (52.0)	14.7 (58.5)	16.8 (62.2)	16.4 (61.5)	11.5 (52.7)	5.5 (41.9)	−1.4 (29.5)	−5.9 (21.4)	5.5 (41.9)
Mean daily minimum °C (°F)	−10.8 (12.6)	−8.3 (17.1)	−4.7 (23.5)	−0.8 (30.6)	3.7 (38.7)	7.6 (45.7)	9.5 (49.1)	8.6 (47.5)	4.5 (40.1)	0.2 (32.4)	−5.0 (23.0)	−9.6 (14.7)	−0.4 (31.3)
Record low °C (°F)	−46.7 (−52.1)	−42.2 (−44.0)	−38.9 (−38.0)	−20.0 (−4.0)	−10.0 (14.0)	−3.3 (26.1)	0.6 (33.1)	−2.6 (27.3)	−8.9 (16.0)	−28.4 (−19.1)	−37.8 (−36.0)	−46.7 (−52.1)	−46.7 (−52.1)
Record low wind chill	−48	−43	−42	−25	−10	−2	0	−1	−9	−27	−48	−47	−48
Average precipitation mm (inches)	47.8 (1.88)	22.7 (0.89)	24.9 (0.98)	24.5 (0.96)	42.6 (1.68)	66.4 (2.61)	65.6 (2.58)	46.2 (1.82)	50.2 (1.98)	52.6 (2.07)	51.3 (2.02)	41.6 (1.64)	536.2 (21.11)
Average rainfall mm (inches)	10.4 (0.41)	6.7 (0.26)	12.7 (0.50)	21.2 (0.83)	41.4 (1.63)	66.4 (2.61)	65.6 (2.58)	46.2 (1.82)	50.2 (1.98)	46.3 (1.82)	22.3 (0.88)	4.9 (0.19)	394.3 (15.52)
Average snowfall cm (inches)	44.0 (17.3)	19.0 (7.5)	13.4 (5.3)	3.6 (1.4)	1.2 (0.5)	0.0 (0.0)	0.0 (0.0)	0.0 (0.0)	0.0 (0.0)	6.7 (2.6)	31.5 (12.4)	42.8 (16.9)	162.1 (63.8)
Average precipitation days (≥ 0.2 mm)	12.8	9.7	9.7	9.8	12.1	15.8	14.2	12.0	12.4	14.8	14.0	13.4	150.7
Average rainy days (≥ 0.2 mm)	3.1	3.4	5.9	8.8	11.9	15.8	14.2	12.0	12.4	13.7	7.2	2.4	110.8
Average snowy days (≥ 0.2 mm)	11.3	7.1	5.4	2.2	0.72	0.0	0.0	0.0	0.0	2.4	8.8	11.8	49.7
Average relative humidity (%) (at 15:00LST)	74.3	62.0	46.9	37.9	40.0	44.8	44.4	42.9	49.4	59.0	72.6	75.7	54.2
Source: Environment and Climate Change Canada

== Demographics ==
In the 2021 Canadian census conducted by Statistics Canada, Quesnel had a population of 9,889 living in 4,508 of its 4,766 total private dwellings, a change of 0.1% from its 2016 population of 9,879. With a land area of 35.35 km^{2} (13.65 sq mi), it had a population density of 279.7/km^{2} (724.5/sq mi) in 2021. According to the same census, Quesnel had a census agglomeration population of 23,113, which represented a decrease from 23,146 in the 2016 census.

The median household income in 2015 for Quesnel was $60,651, which is slightly below the British Columbia provincial average of $69,995.

As of 2018, the population of Quesnel is estimated to be a little over 10,000 people living within the city, with roughly 13,000 people living outside the city limits but within the metro area.

=== Ethnicity ===
Panethnic groups in the City of Quesnel (1986−2021)
Panethnic group	2021		2016		2011		2006		2001		1996		1991		1986	
Panethnic group	Pop.	%	Pop.	%	Pop.	%	Pop.	%	Pop.	%	Pop.	%	Pop.	%	Pop.	%
European (Note: Statistic includes all persons that did not make up part of a visible minority or an indigenous identity.)	7,680	79.3%	7,245	74.81%	7,670	78.03%	7,290	79.46%	7,805	79.28%	6,325	75.52%	6,290	77.65%	6,360	77%
Indigenous	1,305	13.47%	1,610	16.62%	1,415	14.39%	1,045	11.39%	880	8.94%	710	8.48%	610	7.53%	480	5.81%
South Asian	295	3.05%	510	5.27%	485	4.93%	555	6.05%	830	8.43%	1,150	13.73%	1,040	12.84%	1,130	13.68%
Southeast Asian (Note: Statistic includes total responses of "Filipino" and "Southeast Asian" under visible minority section on census.)	170	1.76%	90	0.93%	45	0.46%	90	0.98%	80	0.81%	70	0.84%	20	0.25%	70	0.85%
East Asian (Note: Statistic includes total responses of "Chinese", "Korean", and "Japanese" under visible minority section on census.)	100	1.03%	170	1.76%	140	1.42%	170	1.85%	200	2.03%	70	0.84%	110	1.36%	210	2.54%
African	55	0.57%	20	0.21%	25	0.25%	15	0.16%	15	0.15%	55	0.66%	10	0.12%	0	0%
Latin American	45	0.46%	20	0.21%	25	0.25%	10	0.11%	40	0.41%	0	0%	10	0.12%	5	0.06%
Middle Eastern (Note: Statistic includes total responses of "West Asian" and "Arab" under visible minority section on census.)	0	0%	10	0.1%	0	0%	10	0.11%	0	0%	0	0%	10	0.12%	5	0.06%
Other/multiracial (Note: Statistic includes total responses of "Visible minority, n.i.e." and "Multiple visible minorities" under visible minority section on census.)	20	0.21%	20	0.21%	0	0%	10	0.11%	10	0.1%	0	0%	—N/a	—N/a	—N/a	—N/a
Total responses	9,685	97.94%	9,685	98.04%	9,830	98.23%	9,175	98.38%	9,845	98.02%	8,375	98.9%	8,100	98.68%	8,260	98.83%
Total population	9,889	100%	9,879	100%	10,007	100%	9,326	100%	10,044	100%	8,468	100%	8,208	100%	8,358	100%
Note: Totals greater than 100% due to multiple origin responses.

=== Religion ===
According to the 2021 census, religious groups in Quesnel included:

- Irreligion (6,050 persons or 62.5%)
- Christianity (3,260 persons or 33.7%)
- Sikhism (185 persons or 1.9%)
- Hinduism (70 persons or 0.7%)
- Buddhism (15 persons or 0.2%)
- Indigenous Spirituality (10 persons or 0.1%)
- Other (90 persons or 0.9%)

Religious groups in Quesnel (1991–2021)
Religious group	2021		2011		2001		1991	
Religious group	Pop.	%	Pop.	%	Pop.	%	Pop.	%
Christian	3,260	33.66%	4,200	42.73%	5,230	53.15%	4,525	55.86%
Sikh	185	1.91%	355	3.61%	695	7.06%	970	11.98%
Hindu	70	0.72%	55	0.56%	100	1.02%	50	0.62%
Buddhist	15	0.15%	30	0.31%	70	0.71%	0	0%
Indigenous spirituality	10	0.1%	20	0.2%	N/A	N/A	N/A	N/A
Muslim	0	0%	0	0%	20	0.2%	0	0%
Jewish	0	0%	0	0%	0	0%	20	0.25%
Other religion	90	0.93%	100	1.02%	40	0.41%	15	0.19%
Irreligious	6,050	62.47%	5,060	51.48%	3,690	37.5%	2,515	31.05%
Total responses	9,685	97.94%	9,830	98.23%	9,840	97.97%	8,100	98.68%

== Economy ==
Quesnel is a city known for its forestry, particularly the production of pulp and lumber. Forestry is the single biggest employer in Quesnel. Quesnel is home to a Bleached Chemi-ThermoMechanical Pulp (BCTMP) mill that was built in 1981, and a NBSK (northern bleached softwood kraft) pulp mill that started production in 1972. The BCTMP mill is currently 100% owned by West Fraser Timber, and the NBSK mill is a 50 / 50 joint venture between West Fraser and Mercer International. There is also a large sawmill, a plywood mill, and a MDF plant all owned and operated by West Fraser Timber. West Fraser started in Quesnel in the 1950s, and is now the largest manufacturer of wood products in North America, with operations also in Europe.

== Administration ==
Quesnel's city government consists of a seven-member council, that is one mayor and six councillors. The current city council, elected in 2022 for a four-year term, is composed of mayor Ron Paul and councillors Scott Elliott, Tony Goulet, Debora McKelvie, Laurey-Anne Roodenburg, Martin Runge, and Mitch Vik.

== Education ==
Quesnel is part of School District 28, which contains several elementary schools, as well as a junior and a senior secondary school (Quesnel Junior High School and Correlieu Senior Secondary School respectively). Also, within the school district is McNaughton Centre which is an Alternate High school. For post secondary education, Quesnel has the College of New Caledonia and University of Northern British Columbia shared campus, which offers several programs, including four year nursing and social work degrees, foundation or apprenticeship-level trades certification, health sciences, human services, academic upgrading, or industry and continuing education courses. The Quesnel CNC Campus also offers students the chance to start arts or sciences degrees and then, transfer to university.

== Transportation ==
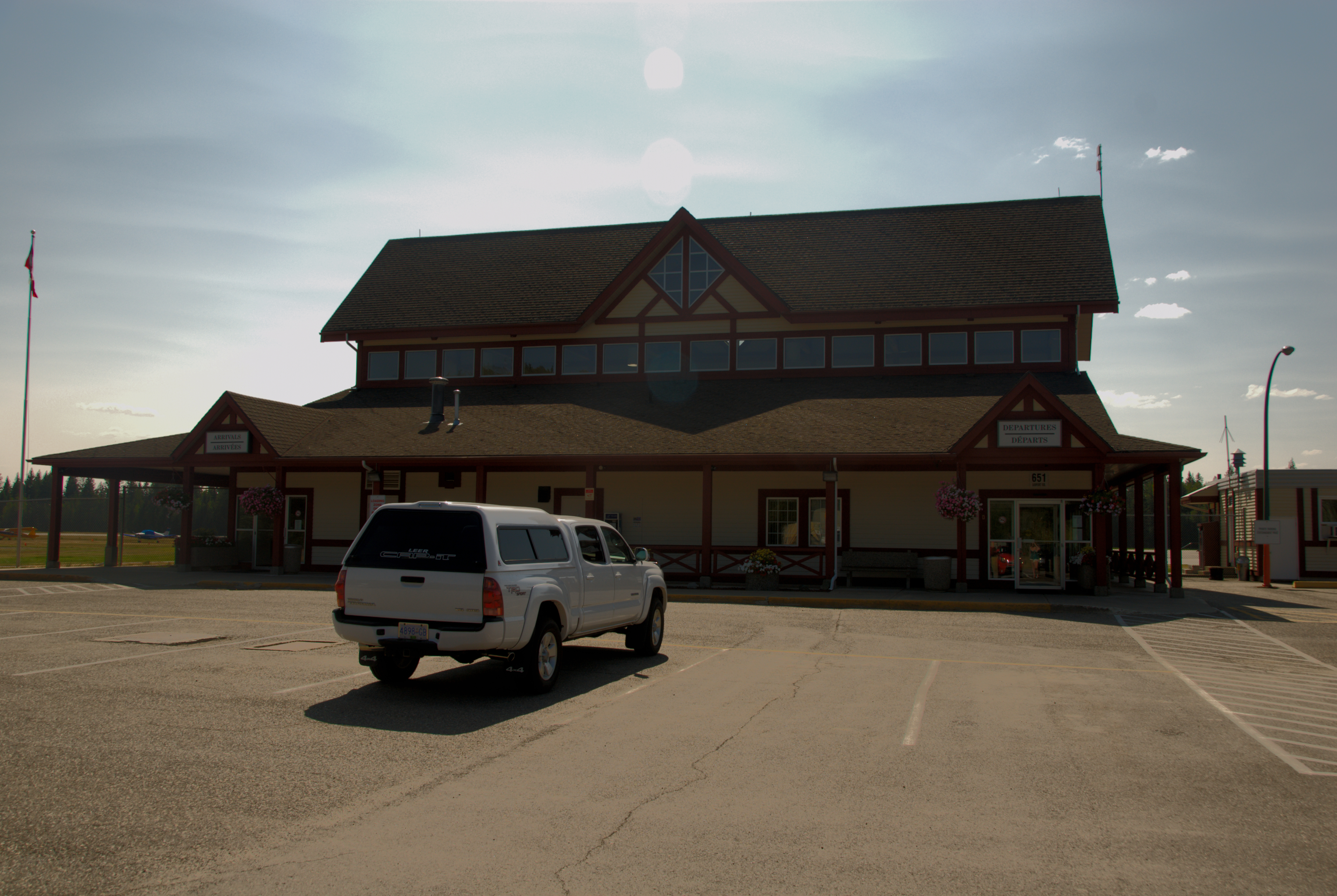
Quesnel Airport

Quesnel is served by the Quesnel Airport, with several commercial flights daily to and from Vancouver. The city has a local transit system provided by BC Transit.

== Healthcare ==
Quesnel is served by GR Baker Memorial Hospital.

A new emergency section was added to the hospital on 14 April 2023. This increased the overall size of the hospital as well as making it easier for patients to move from building to building.

== Tourism ==
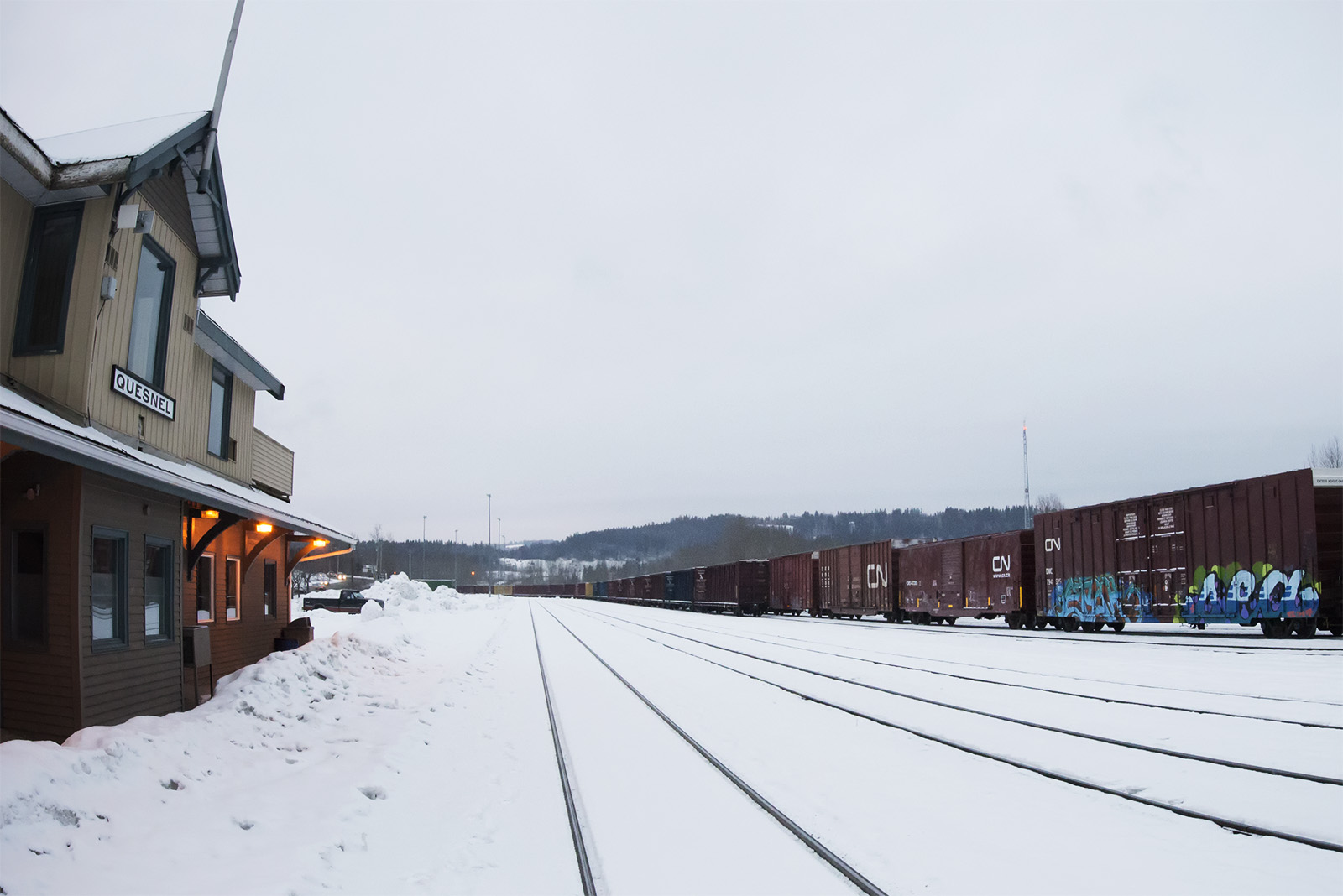
Pacific Great Eastern Railway Station

Quesnel's tourism industry is largely based on the city's access to nature, with hunting and guiding outfitters, fishing, hiking, canoeing. The Rocky Mountaineer, a rail-tour train also travels through and stops overnight at Quesnel at the Pacific Great Eastern Railway Station, owned by BC Rail.

Quesnel's history as a gold-rush town is also reflected, as there are over 30 heritage sites around the city. Quesnel is home to the world's largest gold pan, measured at 5.5 m (18 ft) in diameter and weighing 1,400 kg (3,100 lb), although this is disputed by Nome, Alaska. As of 2020 the gold pan resides in its new location, one deemed controversial, near the local Visitor Centre and Museum. Quesnel is also the closest city to Barkerville, the largest historic site in western North America, and epicentre of the Cariboo Gold Rush.

Troll Ski Resort, or simply Troll, is located 44 km (27 mi) east of the city. Quesnel is also home to Hallis Lake Cross Country Skiing Facility, a 75 km (47 mi) network of trails maintained by the Cariboo Ski Touring Club for cross-country skiing and snowshoeing. In addition, Ten Mile Lake Provincial Park, Pinnacles Provincial Park, and Dragon Mountain Provincial Park are also located just outside the city.

Quesnel Museum is home to numerous artifacts, including Mandy, a "haunted doll" made in the early 20th century that is claimed to have paranormal abilities and eyes that follow visitors around. Mandy appeared on The Montel Williams Show.

== Culture ==
There are twenty-three decorated fire hydrants in the streets of Quesnel. This work was sponsored by the local businesses in the vicinity of the hydrants.

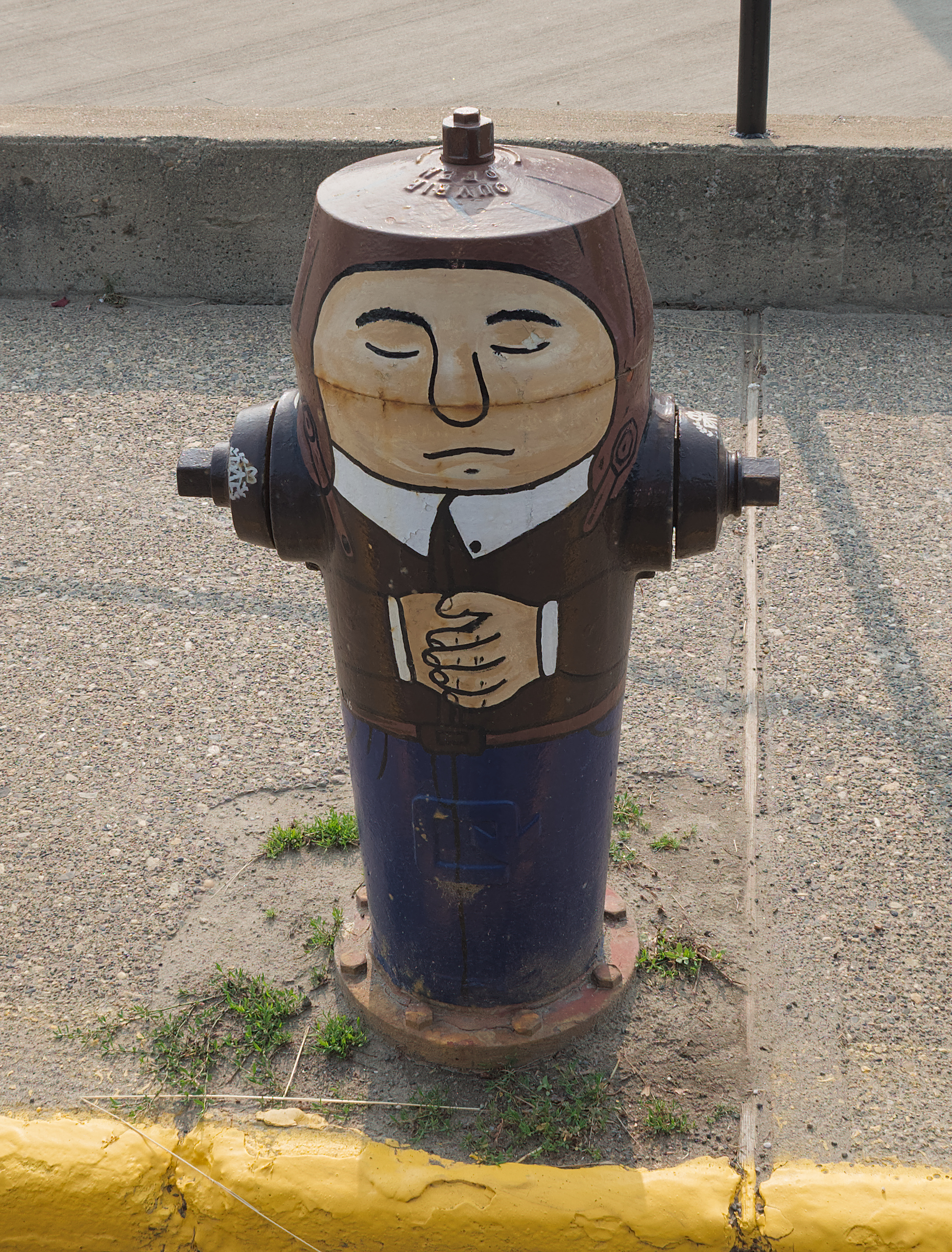
"Pilot", Carson Avenue and Kinchant Street

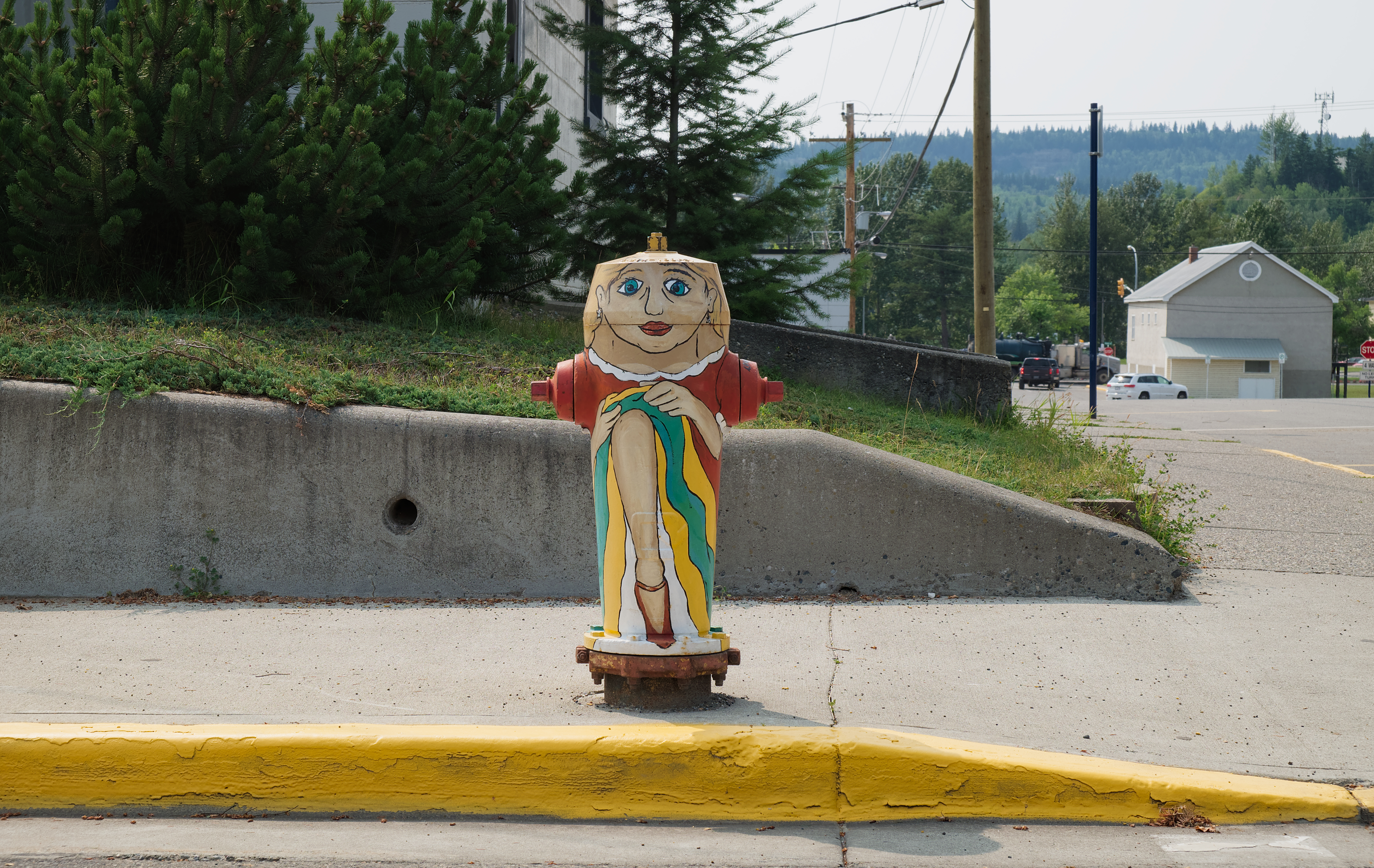
"Can Can Girl", McLean Street and Shepherd Avenue

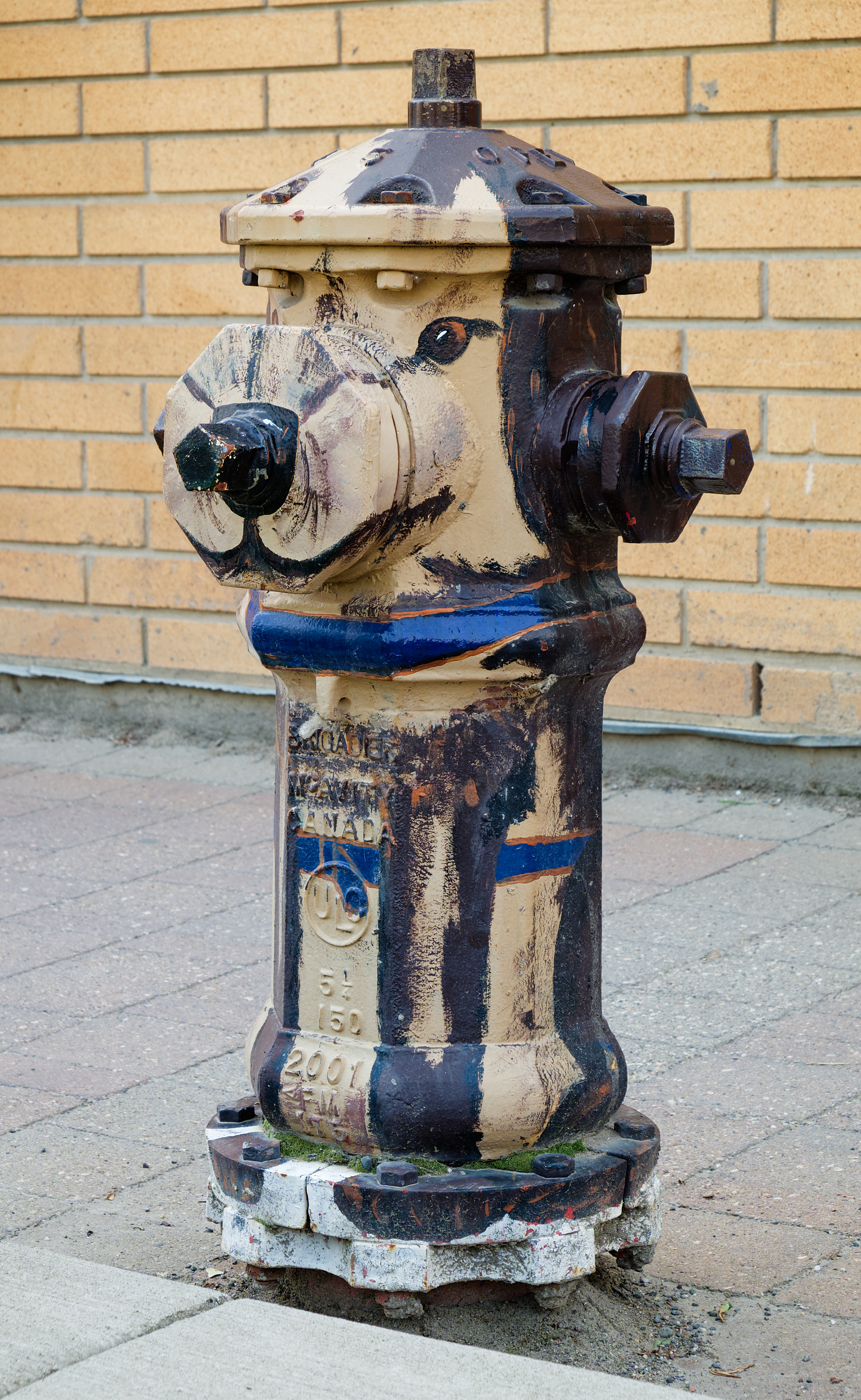
McLean Street and St Laurent Avenue

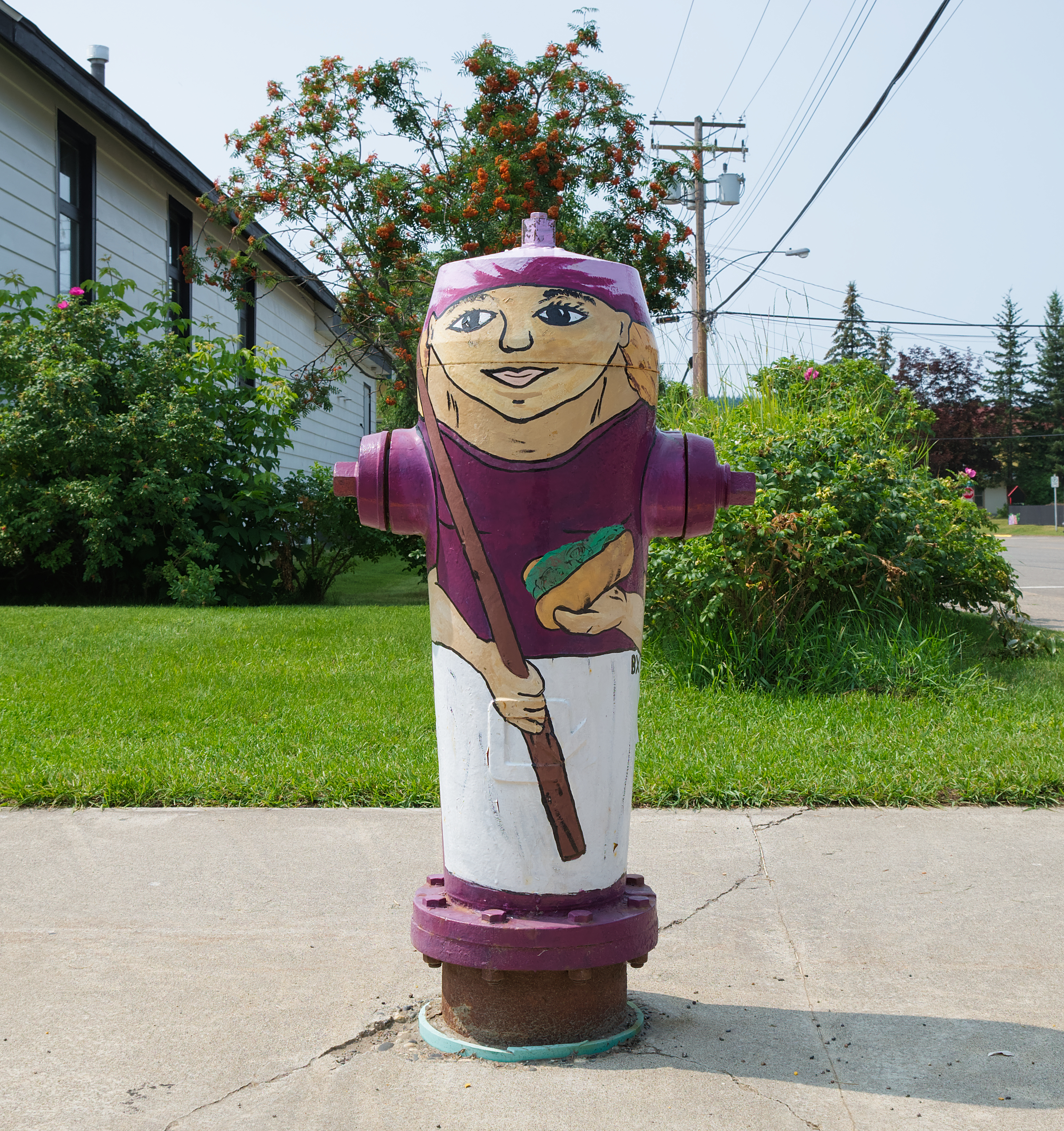
"BX Cook", Shepherd Avenue and Kinchant Street

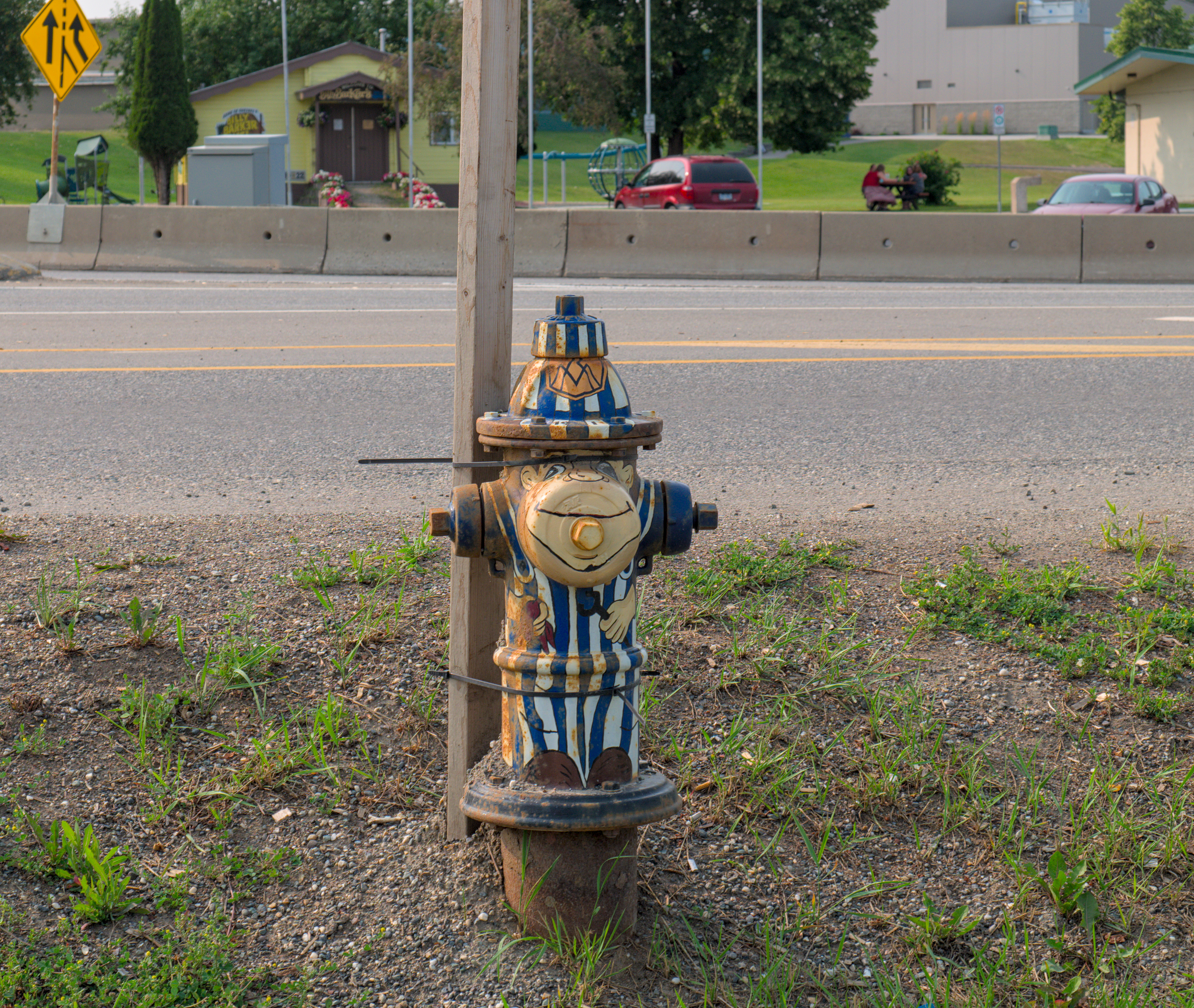
"Engineer", Legion Drive, Cariboo Highway, and Carson Avenue

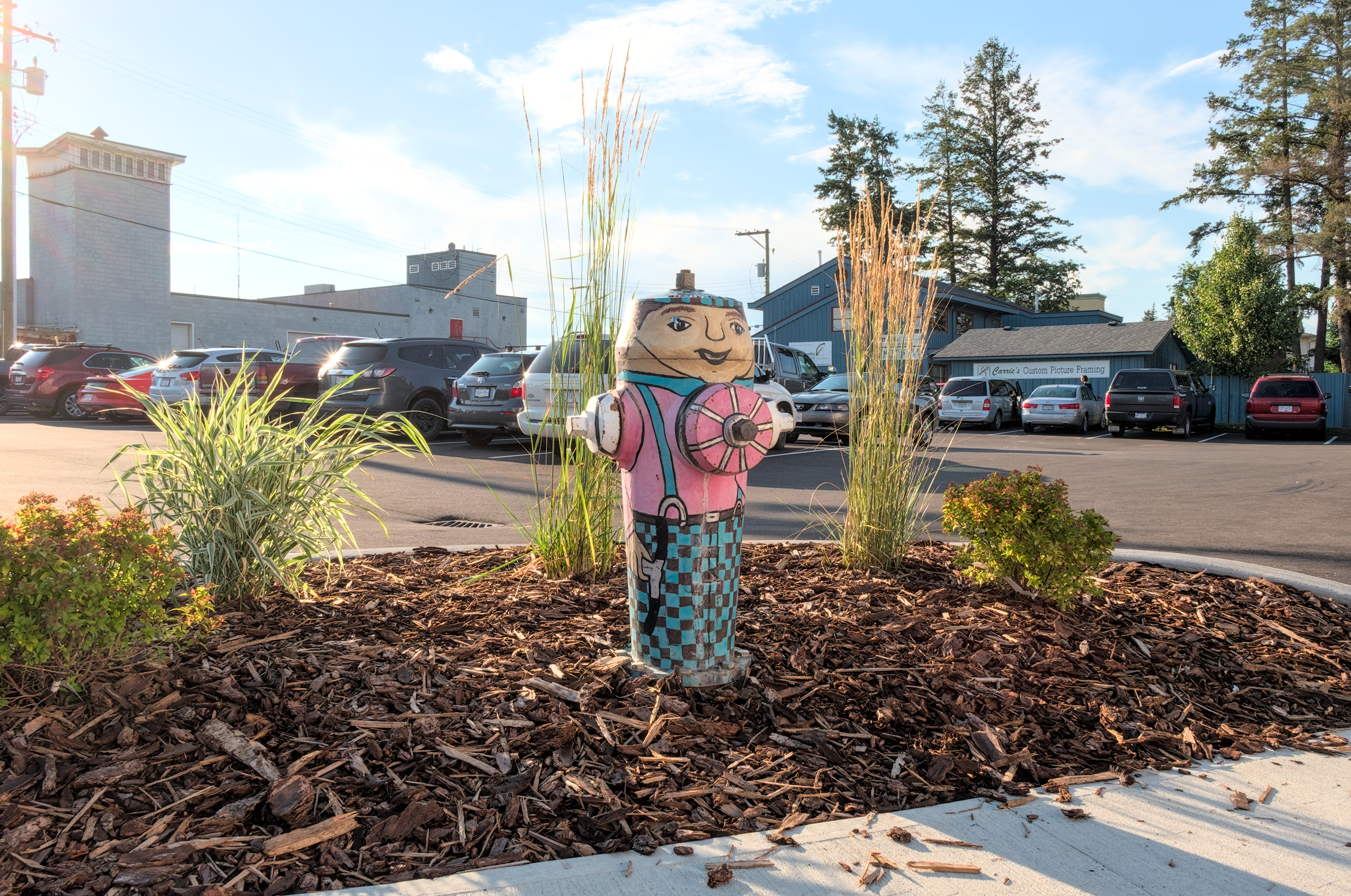
"Cyclist", Barlow Avenue and Vaughan Street

== Sports ==
Quesnel is home to the Central Interior Hockey League's Quesnel Kangaroos Senior AA hockey team. The team plays at the West Fraser Centre in Quesnel. The city was formerly home to the Quesnel Millionaires, a British Columbia Hockey League (BCHL) team, before they relocated to Chilliwack as the Chilliwack Chiefs in 2011.

Quesnel also has soccer, airsoft and paintball, minor baseball, softball, lacrosse, ringette, roller derby, and football leagues. A Mountain biking skills park is located behind the Arts and Recreation Centre and West Quesnel has a skateboard park known as the Quesnel Skatepark.

== Notable people ==
- Brett Festerling – former National Hockey League (NHL) player (Anaheim Ducks and Winnipeg Jets)
- Aaron Gagnon – former NHL player (Dallas Stars and Winnipeg Jets)
- Bob Gassoff – former NHL player (St. Louis Blues)
- Brad Gassoff – former NHL player (Vancouver Canucks)
- Arjun Gill – wrestling gold medallist at the 2014 Commonwealth Games
- Rory MacDonald – mixed martial artist currently with Bellator MMA in the Welterweight division
- Marco Marra – professor, medical genetics, University of British Columbia
- Jim Marsh – former World Hockey Association player (Birmingham Bulls)
- Errol Rausse – former NHL player (Washington Capitals)
- Bob Simpson – former provincial MLA for Cariboo North and former mayor of Quesnel
- Tom Stade – comedian

== Neighbourhoods and nearby communities ==
- West Quesnel
  - Uplands
  - Riverview
  - West Riverside
- South Quesnel
  - Southhills
  - Red Bluff
  - Dragon Lake
  - Rich Bar
- North Quesnel
- Carson Sub
- Johnston Sub

Nearby communities, not part of the City of Quesnel, include:

- Moose Heights
- Ten Mile Lake (also locally referred to as Parkland)
- Barlow Creek
- West Fraser / Narcosli
- Cottonwood
- Nazko
- Bouchie Lake
- Kersley

== Images ==
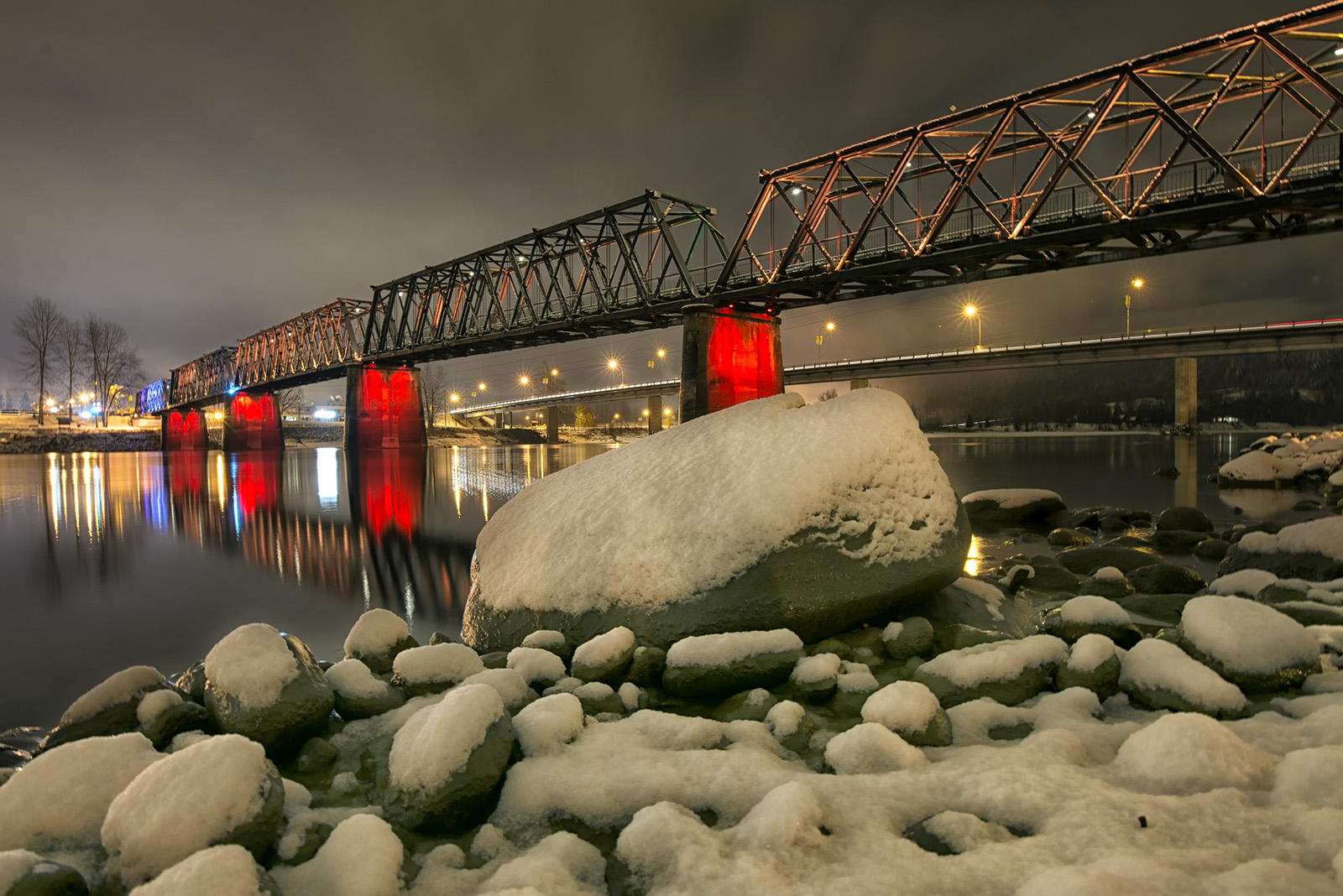
Fraser River walking bridge

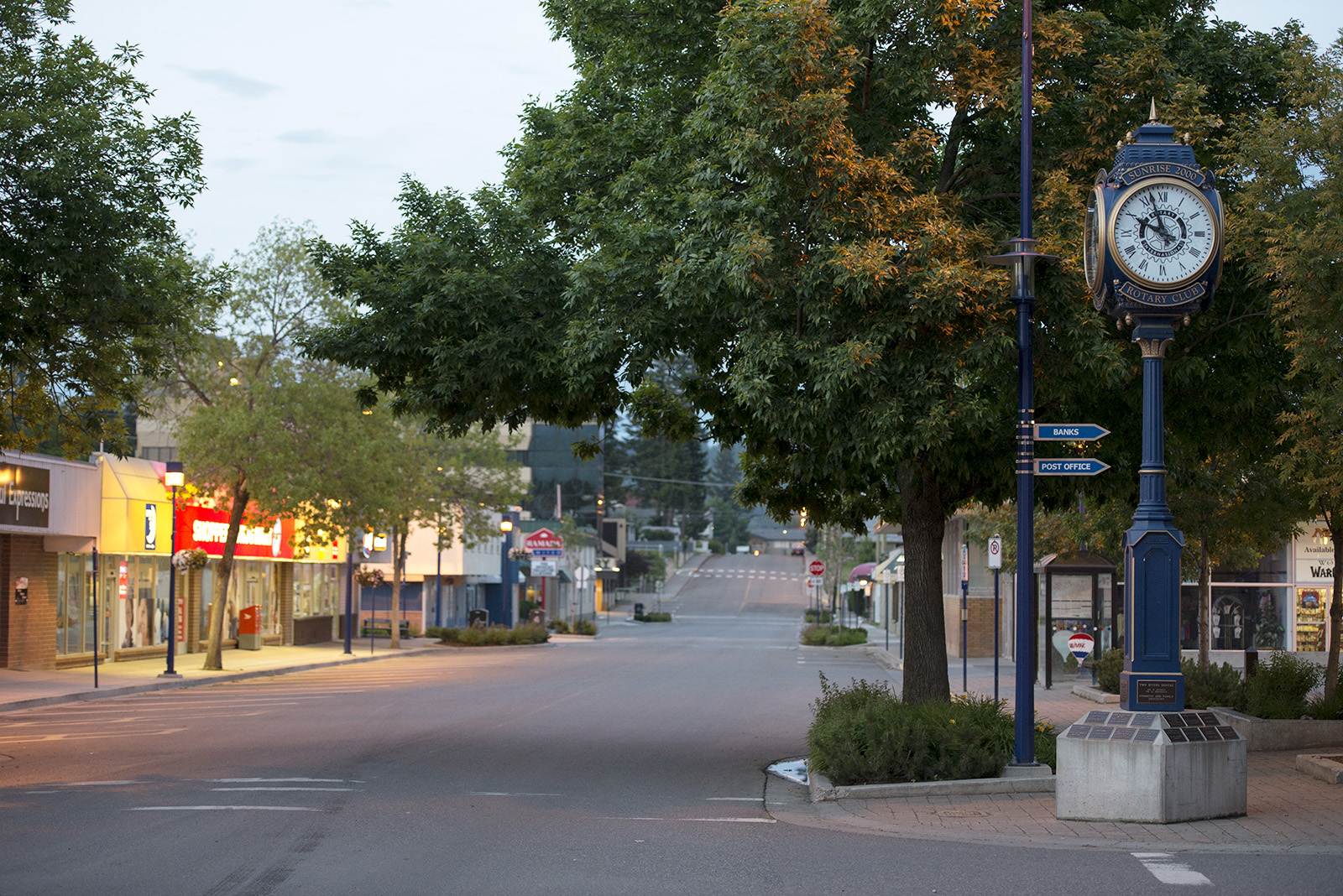
Looking down St Laurent Ave; Rotary Clock in the foreground

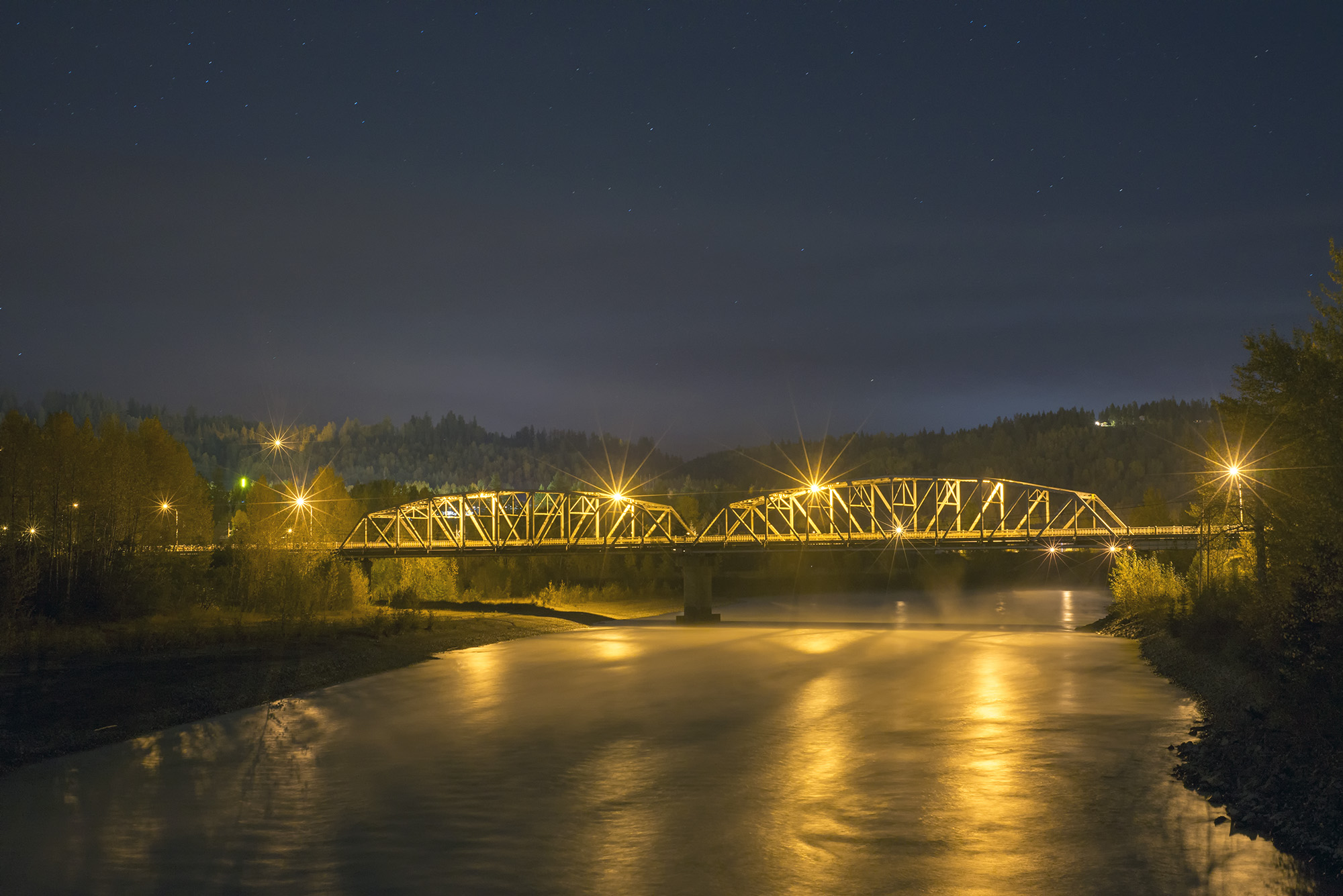
Bridge over the Quesnel River

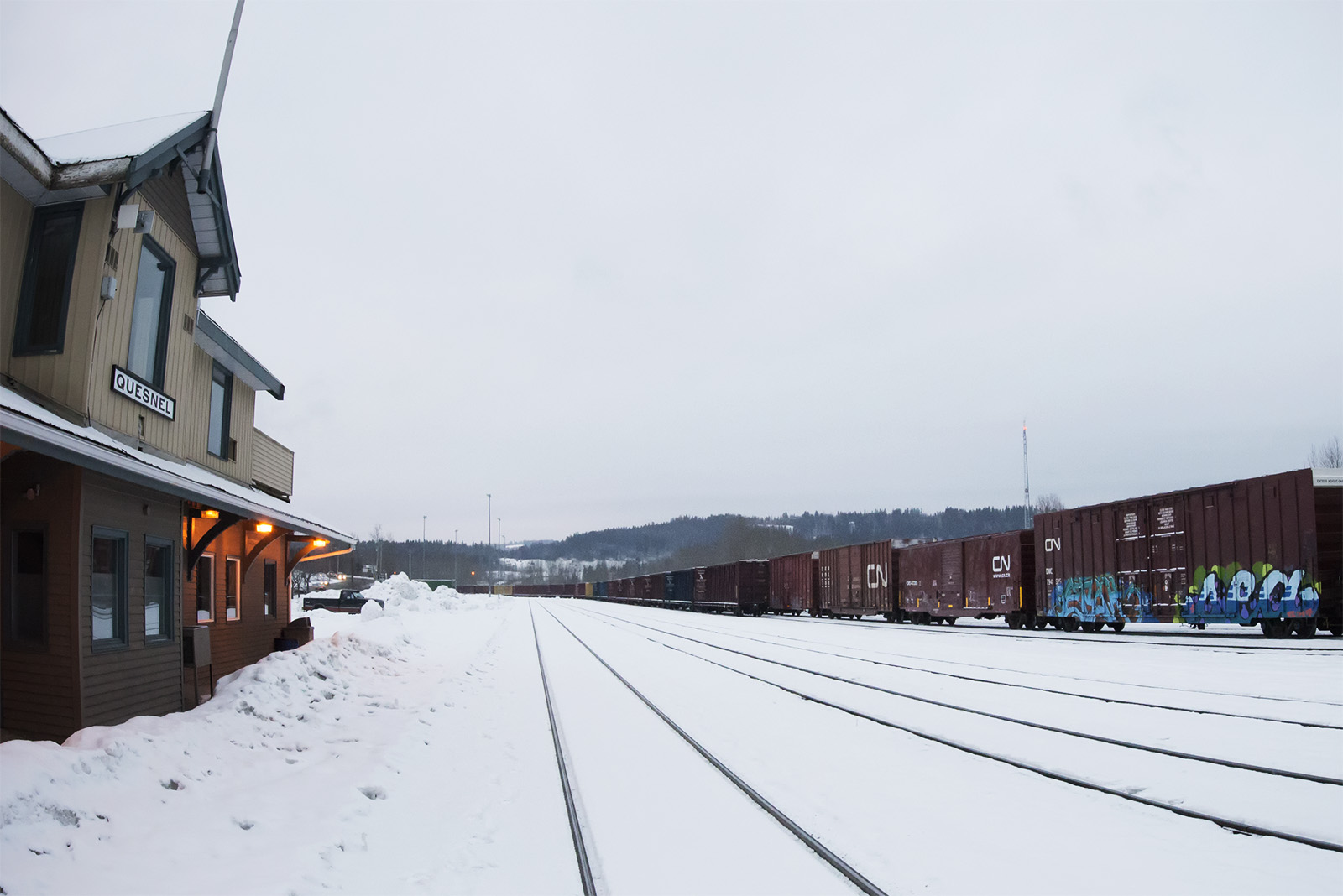
Quesnel Station

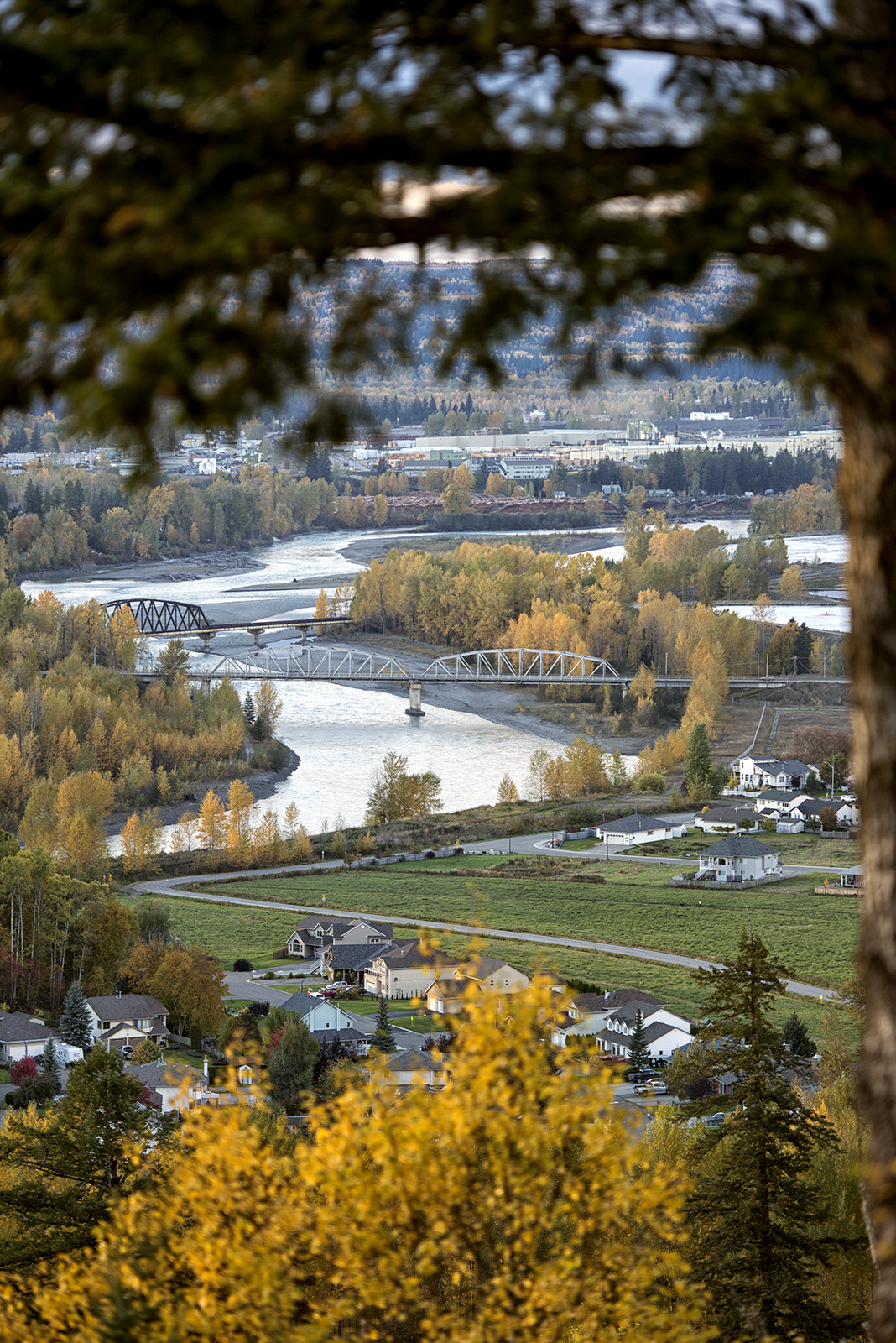
Quesnel River from Red Bluff.

== Sister city ==
- Shiraoi, Japan
