= Dragon Lake, British Columbia =

Dragon Lake
- Location of Dragon Lake in British Columbia
- Coordinates: 52°57′57″N 122°24′14″W
- Country: Canada
- Province: British Columbia
- Time zone: UTC−07:00 (PT)
- Area codes: 250, 778

Dragon Lake is an unincorporated community just south of Quesnel named after the lake of the same name nearby. It is one of the main commercial areas of Greater Quesnel, including a number of large shopping plazas and major supermarkets and big box stores. The locality includes Dragon Lake Indian Reserve No. 3, one of the Indian Reserves of the Red Bluff First Nation.
