= List of copper mines in Canada =

This is a list of copper mines in Canada sorted by province.

== British Columbia ==
Mine	Coordinates	Associated town	Owner	Dates	Comments	References
Gibraltar Mine	52°31′47.31″N 122°17′11.53″W	McLeese Lake	Taseko Mines	1973–Present	Reserves of 2.4 billion pounds of copper and 69 million pounds of molybdenum	
Highland Valley Copper mine	50°28′25″N 121°01′18″W	Logan Lake	Teck Resources	1962–Present		
Mount Polley mine	52°30′48″N 121°35′47″W	Williams Lake	Imperial Metals	1997–Present	On care and maintenance status during remediation work on site	
New Afton mine	50.659813°N 120.513437°W	Kamloops	New Gold	2012–Present	Proven and probable reserves of the mine were 1.0 million ounces of gold, 2.8 million ounces of silver, and 802 million pounds of copper	
Mount Milligan Mine	55°07′26″N 124°01′39″W	Between Fort St.James and Mackenzie	Centerra Gold	2014-Present	A open pit operation that extracts both copper and gold ore.	

== Newfoundland and Labrador ==
Mine	Coordinates	Associated town	Owner	Dates	Comments	References
Duck Pond mine	48°38′38.19″N 56°29′19.59″W	Millertown	Teck Resources	2007–2015	Closed in 2015	

== Ontario ==
Mine	Coordinates	Associated town	Owner	Dates	Comments	References
Coldstream copper mine	48.603°N 90.592°W	Burchell Lake	Ovintiv	1957-1967		
Coleman Mine	46°40′1.51″N 81°21′36.36″W	Sudbury	Vale Limited	1970–Present	Flagship mine of Vale's Sudbury operation	
Kidd Mine	48°41′20″N 81°21′55″W	Timmins	Glencore	1966-Present		

== Quebec ==
This is a list of mines in the Canadian province of Quebec and includes both operating and closed mines.

Mine	Commodities	Ore deposit	Administrative regions	Owner(s)	Period
Raglan Mine	Ni, Cu, Co	Komatiitic	Nord-du-Québec	Glencore (Switzerland)	1997-
Mouska	Au, Cu, Ag		Abitibi-Témiscamingue	Iamgold (Canada)	1991-2014
LaRonde	Au, Cu, Ag, Zn		Abitibi-Témiscamingue	Agnico-Eagle (Canada)	1988-
Langlois	Au, Cu, Ag, Zn		Abitibi-Témiscamingue	Breakwater Resources (Canada)	1996-2001 2007-2008 2012-2019
Persévérance	Au, Cu, Ag, Zn	VHMS	Nord-du-Québec	Xstrata (Switzerland)	2008-2013?
Eustis	Cu, S		Estrie	Consolidated Copper and Sulphur Company (1927-1939) (Canada)	1865-1939
Capelton	Cu		Estrie		1863-1907
Troïlus	Au, Cu		Nord-du-Québec	Inmet Mining (Canada)	1997-2010
Gaspé Copper	Cu		Gaspésie–Îles-de-la-Madeleine	Noranda mining (Canada)	1968-1999
Aldermac	Au, Ag, Cu		Abitibi-Témiscamingue		1932-1943
East Sullivan	Cu, Zn		Abitibi-Témiscamingue		1949-1967
Manitou	Au, Ag, Cu, Zn		Abitibi-Témiscamingue		1942-1994
Des Georges	Cu, Au, Ag		Nord-du-Québec		1954-1991
Principale	Cu, Au, Ag		Nord-du-Québec		1955-2008
