= Duck Pond mine =

Mine in Newfoundland, Canada

- Location in Canada

Location
- Location: Millertown, Newfoundland and Labrador, Canada; 48°38′38.19″N 56°29′19.59″W

Production
- Products: Copper; Zinc; Silver; Gold
- Production: 41 million pounds of copper; 70 million pounds of zinc; 536,000 ounces of silver; 4,100 ounces gold; (2006 projection)

History
- Opened: 2007
- Closed: 2015

Owner
- Company: Teck Resources
- Acquired: 2007

The Duck Pond Mine is an underground Canadian copper and zinc mine that was owned and operated by Teck Resources 28 kilometres (17 mi) south of Millertown in Newfoundland, Canada. It closed operations in July 2015.

The mine was owned by Aur Resources until Aur was taken over by Teck in 2007. The property was originally optioned by Thundermin Resources from Noranda. Thundermin partnered with Queenston Mining to develop the project in 2001. Noranda had originally planned to develop the site in 1988 but the conditions were not economically feasible.

During operations, the mine employed 270 workers in two shifts.

The semi-autogenous grinding (SAG) mill at the mine processed 1800 tpd. Further processing included a ball mill and flotation circuit.

== See also ==
- List of copper mines in Canada
- Mount Polley mine
- Highland Valley Copper mine
- New Afton mine
- Gibraltar Mine
