= Yukon–Tanana terrane =

Largest tectonostratigraphic terrane in the northern North American Cordillera

Coordinates: 61.821°N 141.203°W

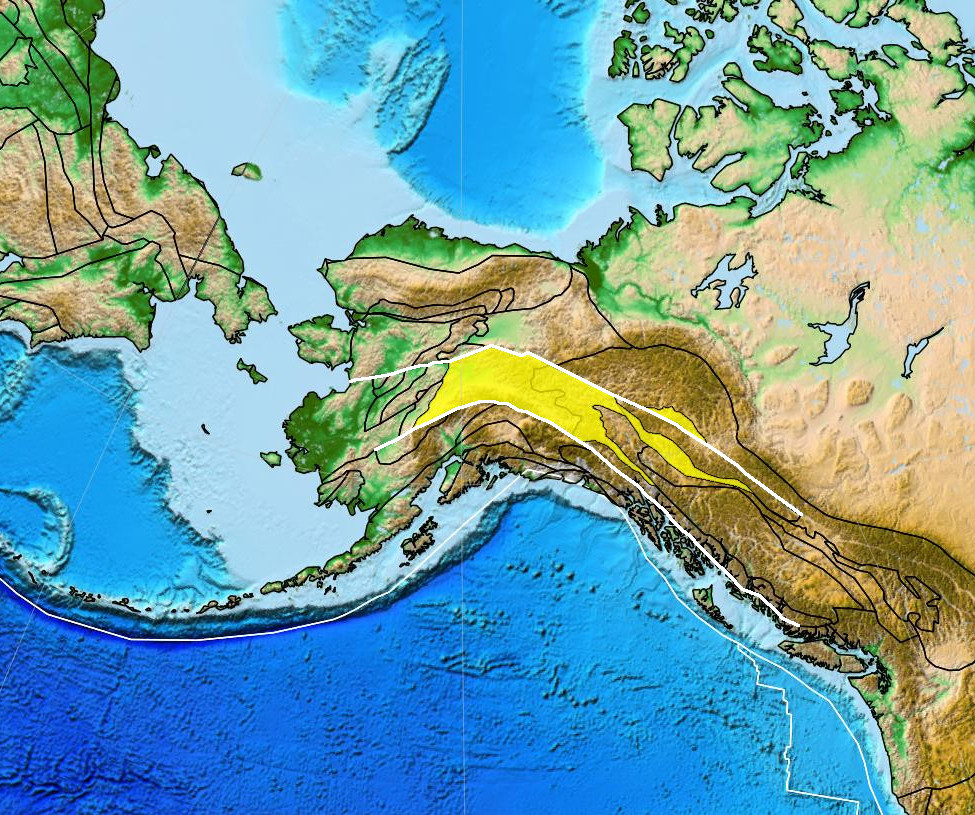
The Yukon–Tanana terrane (yellow) stretches across Alaska, Yukon, and British Columbia. Kaltag–Tintina fault (north of YTT) and Denali-Fairweather Fault (south of YTT) in white.

The Yukon–Tanana terrane (YTT) is a tectonic terrane that extends from central Alaska through central Yukon and into northern British Columbia, Canada, and southeast Alaska, USA. Extending over 2,000 kilometres (1,200 mi), the YTT is the largest tectonostratigraphic terrane in the northern North American Cordillera. The Yukon–Tanana Upland is a physiographic province mostly underlain by rocks of the Yukon–Tanana terrane.

Understanding and definition of the YTT is constantly progressing, the term "Yukon Tanana composite terrane" or "YTCT" is used by some workers, reflecting the disparate depositional and tectonic histories being recognized in rock units within the YTT. Since 2010, some work dispenses altogether with the term Yukon–Tanana terrane, in favor of more detailed subdivisions.

== Tectonic history ==
The YTT consists of polymetamorphosed and polydeformed metasedimentary, metavolcanic, and metaplutonic rocks of Upper Paleozoic and older ages that were deposited or emplaced near the edge of the North American continental margin. Rocks in the terrane record a variety of tectonic settings and have experienced varying amounts of tectonic transport, both before and after amalgamation of the YTT with North America. Sequences of mainly parautochthonous quartz-rich sedimentary rocks derived from the North American continent also include meta-igneous rocks with mostly continental geochemical and isotopic signatures. Structurally higher sequences contain meta-igneous rocks with arc and back-arc characteristics. The Slide Mountain/Seventymile terrane, composed of volcanic rocks typical of seafloor and of typical seafloor sediments, is recognized as an ocean basin that divided parts of the YTT before amalgamation of the Yukon–Tanana terrane with the continental margin.

The right-lateral strike slip Tintina Fault occurs along the suture zone between the YTT (on the south and west) and ancestral North America to the east; it forms a significant boundary between North America cratonic rocks and rocks of the YTT and associated terranes, although displaced continental rocks are found south of the Tintina Fault and pieces of the YTT occur north of the Tintina Fault. Parts of the YTT have been offset by at least 400 km (250 mi) along the Tintina Fault. In most of the Alaskan part of the YTT the Denali Fault forms the modern day southern boundary of the terrane. In Yukon the ocean-basin rocks of the Windy–McKinley terrane (in western Yukon), and the Coast Plutonic Complex (CPC) form the southern boundary of the YTT. Units assigned to the YTT also occur within the CPC; and the YTT partially encloses and is complexly related to the Intermontane superterrane (together with the Stikine, Cache Creek, and Quesnel terranes).

== Metal mineralization ==
In Alaska (Delta district) and Yukon (Finlayson Lake belt) the YTT contains a number of Devonian volcanogenic massive sulfide ore deposits with significant copper, zinc, lead, silver and gold mineralization. Sulfide minerals include massive to disseminated pyrite and pyrrhotite with lesser amounts of chalcopyrite, galena, sphalerite and arsenopyrite. The deposits show evidence of an Early Cretaceous, amphibolite facies event and a younger, mid-Cretaceous lower greenschist facies event which resulted from the accretion of the Yukon–Tanana Terrane. A belt of significant Late Triassic to Early Jurassic Cu–Au and Cu–Mo porphyry deposits, such as Highland Valley Copper and Galore, of the Stikine Terrane and Quesnel Terrane extends into the Yukon–Tanana Terrane in Yukon; the Minto mine is an example. Gold mineralization associated with post-amalgamation emplacement of Cretaceous and Tertiary plutonic rocks is widespread in the YTT.
