= Coleman Mine =

Nickel and copper mine in Ontario, Canada

- Location Coleman Mine (Ontario) Coleman Mine (Canada)
- Interactive map of Coleman Mine
- Location: Ontario, Canada; 46°40′1.51″N 81°21′36.36″W
- Products: Nickel; Copper; Cobalt; Platinum; Palladium; Gold
- Discovered: 1885
- Opened: 1970
- Company: Vale Canada Limited
- Website: www.vale.com

The Coleman Mine is an underground nickel and copper mine operated by Vale 45 kilometres (28 mi) northwest of Sudbury, Ontario, Canada. It was the flagship mine of Vale's Sudbury operation. The mine recently implemented the use of electric haul vehicles and installed an underground 4G LTE network.

The mine is operated by a staff of 545 workers.

Ore is transported by rail or by truck for processing at Clarabelle Mill.

== Geology ==
Coleman is located on the north ridge of the Sudbury Basin. It is a magmatic style ore deposit with two kinds of mineralization. The upper area called the Main Ore Body (MOB) consists of a nickel and copper rich zone of massive sulphides known locally as a contact nickel deposit. The lower area of the mine called the 153 and 170 Ore bodies contains large veins of Chalcopyrite and Bornite, strongly enriched in PGMs known as a footwall breccia deposit.

== Culture ==
Coleman is the farthest mine from the center of Vale's operations in Sudbury. Many employees who commute long distances across the whole basin (45 km each way from Downtown Sudbury) tell the testimony of how they get a nod each time they read the sign leading into Coleman which says: "It's Worth the Drive".

== See also ==
- List of nickel mines in Canada
- List of copper mines in Canada
- Highland Valley Copper mine
- Mount Polley mine
- Kidd Mine
- New Afton mine
