= List of mines in Newfoundland and Labrador =

This is a list of mines, past and present, in Newfoundland and Labrador, Canada..

Mine	Major commodities	Coordinates	Associated town	Owner	Dates	Comments
Bell Island Mine	Iron ore		Wabana		1895–1966	Underground Mine
Buchans Mine	Zinc, copper, lead, silver, gold		Buchans	AND Co., Asarco	1906–1911, 1926–1984	Underground mine, open pit mine
Rambler	Copper	49°57'14.57"N 56°4'5.049"W	Ming's Bight	Rambler Metals & Mining Canada	2005 to present	Underground mine
Coal Brook Gypsum Deposit	Gypsum	48.373375°N 58.451512°W	St. George's Bay	Galen Gypsum Mines Ltd.	2009 to 2018	Open-pit mine
Duck Pond mine	Copper, zinc, silver, gold	48°38′38.19″N 56°29′19.59″W	Millertown	Teck Resources	2007–2015	Underground mine
IOC Labrador West Mines	Dolomite, Iron Ore	52°57′4.08″N 66°53′47.98″W	Labrador City	Iron Ore Company of Canada	1962–present	Open-pit mine
Lower Cove Quarry	Dolomite, Limestone	48°31′40.88″N 59°1′32.82″W	Lower Cove	Atlantic Minerals	1988–present	Quarry
Newfoundland Zinc Mine	Zinc	50°21'19''N 57°20'27''W	Daniel's Harbour	Teck Resources	1975–1990	
Nugget Pond Mine	Gold	49°50'35''N 55°46'10''W	Betts Cove	Richmont Mines	1997–2001	
Point Rousse Project	Gold	49°57′41.47″N 56°7′26.33″W	Ming's Bight	Maritime Resources	2010 to present	Open-pit mine
St. Lawrence Fluorspar Mine	Fluorite	46°53′55.93″N 55°26′49.38″W	St. Lawrence	Canada Fluorspar	2018 to present	Open-pit mine, underground mine
Voisey's Bay Mine	Nickel	56°20′5″N 62°6′11″W	Voisey's Bay	Vale Inco	2005–present	Open-pit mine
Scully Mine	Iron Ore		Wabush	Tacora Resources	2017–present	Open-pit mine
