= Minera San Xavier =

Open-pit mine in San Luis Potosí, Mexico

- Type: Subsidiary of Metallica Resources Inc.
- Industry: Mining
- Founded: 1886 (Cerro de San Pedro, San Luis Potosí, Mexico)
- Headquarters: Cerro de San Pedro, San Luis Potosí, Mexico
- Products: Gold, silver
- Website: msx.com.mx

Minera San Xavier was an open-pit mine in San Luis Potosí, Mexico. This mine is a subsidiary of the Canadian company New Gold Inc. that operates a gold and silver mine near Cerro de San Pedro, a municipality of San Luis Potosí just 12 kilometers away from the capital city of the state. The city of San Luis Potosí was founded after gold was discovered in the hills near Cerro de San Pedro in the 15th century. The current mine is closed, after taking several years to go through the closing process.

== History ==
In this area there is a history of mining going back to the 15th century. In 1995 the Canadian Mining company went over to Cerro de San Pedro and in 1999, they were granted the ability to mine the area. These authorizations were challenged due to different environmental protection decrees. However the mine was able to continue, was actively mining until 2016, and is currently in the post-closure phase as of 2024.

== Environmental and Social Impacts ==
The mining process of this mine affects the surrounding areas. There are visible environmental impacts that are showing in the form of air pollution, crop damage, loss of water, soil erosion, and waste overflow. On a social level, having the mine has led to an increase in police presence and militarization, land dispossession, and an increase in corruption.

== Community Reactions ==
This area has a long history of defiance and mobilization, this was no different with the most recent mining attempt in the area. The community opposed the mine and attempted to take legal actions to make sure that the mine didn't happen. There was conflict within the community due to the economic opportunities for development, versus the impact that the mines will have on them. Within the community there was the start of a conglomerate of voices against the mine. This started a movement called the Frente Amplio Opositor. This group were the ones that started the legal actions taken against the mine.

== Legal Action ==
The company has defied legal resolutions against its operation by arranging economically with the Mexican ecological authority, the Secretariat of the Environment and Natural Resources (Secretaría de Medio Ambiente y Recursos Naturales, Semarnat), pushing them to disregard ecological research done by some independent institutions and to instead accept most other independent as well as company-funded and government required studies. Continuous internal and external monitoring of mining activities has not produced any evidence of contamination to date.

On 5 February 2007, Pro San Luis Ecológico, A.C., filed a submission before the Commission for Environmental Cooperation under Article 14(1) of the North American Agreement on Environmental Cooperation. The submitter asserted that Mexico was failing to effectively enforce its environmental laws with respect to the authorization of the Cerro de San Pedro project in San San Luis Potos. In submission SEM-07-001 (Minera San Xavier), the submitter asserted that in April 2006 Semarnat violated a Mexican court ruling by authorizing Minera San Xavier project for a second time. On 15 July 2009, the CEC Secretariat decided not to recommend the development of a factual investigation.
