= McLeese Lake, British Columbia =

Human settlement in British Columbia, Canada

Coordinates: 52°25′12″N 122°17′43″W

McLeese Lake is an unincorporated community on British Columbia Highway 97 in the Cariboo region of the Central Interior of British Columbia, Canada. It is named for the lake of the same name, which itself was named for Robert McLeese, a pioneer storekeeper, hotelier and steamboat owner and also politician.

McLeese Lake is home to the Gibraltar Mine, Canada's second-largest open pit copper mine, which is located approximately 10 km north of town. In addition to copper, the Gibraltar Mine also mines Molybdenum.

== History ==
Robert McLeese, in partnership with J.T. Lenay and Thomas Stoddart, acquired 480 acres on 20 July 1863, however it is worth noting that McLeese was the only one of the three to obtain a Crown Grant for his portion of the property.

The name of the community was initially "Mud Lake", and was only renamed in the 1880s by local Soda Creek.

== Climate ==
According to the Köppen Climate Classification, Mcleese Lake has a Humid continental climate (Dfb), With warm summers and cold (but not very cold) winters with moderate snowfall.

Climate data for Mcleese Lake Fraserview
Month	Jan	Feb	Mar	Apr	May	Jun	Jul	Aug	Sep	Oct	Nov	Dec	Year
Record high °C (°F)	15.0 (59.0)	16.0 (60.8)	22.0 (71.6)	28.5 (83.3)	37.0 (98.6)	37.0 (98.6)	39.0 (102.2)	37.0 (98.6)	39.0 (102.2)	29.0 (84.2)	17.5 (63.5)	13.0 (55.4)	39.0 (102.2)
Mean daily maximum °C (°F)	−2.4 (27.7)	1.8 (35.2)	8.6 (47.5)	14.3 (57.7)	19.2 (66.6)	23.0 (73.4)	25.9 (78.6)	25.6 (78.1)	19.8 (67.6)	11.8 (53.2)	3.2 (37.8)	−2.2 (28.0)	12.4 (54.3)
Daily mean °C (°F)	−6.2 (20.8)	−3.0 (26.6)	2.2 (36.0)	6.9 (44.4)	11.7 (53.1)	15.6 (60.1)	17.9 (64.2)	17.2 (63.0)	12.5 (54.5)	6.2 (43.2)	−0.5 (31.1)	−5.8 (21.6)	6.2 (43.2)
Mean daily minimum °C (°F)	−9.9 (14.2)	−7.7 (18.1)	−4.2 (24.4)	−0.4 (31.3)	4.0 (39.2)	8.1 (46.6)	10.0 (50.0)	8.7 (47.7)	5.1 (41.2)	0.5 (32.9)	−4.2 (24.4)	−9.2 (15.4)	0.1 (32.1)
Record low °C (°F)	−40.0 (−40.0)	−33.0 (−27.4)	−27.0 (−16.6)	−10.0 (14.0)	−7.5 (18.5)	−1.0 (30.2)	2.0 (35.6)	−2.0 (28.4)	−6.0 (21.2)	−27.0 (−16.6)	−27.5 (−17.5)	−40.0 (−40.0)	−40.0 (−40.0)
Average precipitation mm (inches)	34.4 (1.35)	14.5 (0.57)	14.7 (0.58)	19.9 (0.78)	38.9 (1.53)	54.0 (2.13)	53.1 (2.09)	41.5 (1.63)	37.6 (1.48)	38.0 (1.50)	37.1 (1.46)	33.2 (1.31)	416.9 (16.41)
Average rainfall mm (inches)	7.0 (0.28)	3.8 (0.15)	9.3 (0.37)	18.2 (0.72)	38.6 (1.52)	54.0 (2.13)	53.1 (2.09)	41.5 (1.63)	37.6 (1.48)	35.8 (1.41)	17.2 (0.68)	3.7 (0.15)	319.8 (12.61)
Average snowfall cm (inches)	27.4 (10.8)	10.7 (4.2)	5.4 (2.1)	1.7 (0.7)	0.4 (0.2)	0.0 (0.0)	0.0 (0.0)	0.0 (0.0)	0.0 (0.0)	2.1 (0.8)	19.9 (7.8)	29.5 (11.6)	97.1 (38.2)
Average precipitation days (≥ 0.2 mm)	8.1	4.9	4.9	6.4	10.3	12.4	11.4	9.8	9.0	10.0	8.0	7.9	103.1
Average rainy days (≥ 0.2 mm)	1.9	1.5	3.6	6.0	10.3	12.4	11.4	9.8	9.0	9.4	4.1	1.4	80.8
Average snowy days (≥ 0.2 cm)	6.7	3.5	1.7	0.7	0.2	0.0	0.0	0.0	0.0	1.0	4.6	6.6	25
Source: Environment Canada
