= Mount Polley mine =

Gold and copper mine in British Columbia, Canada

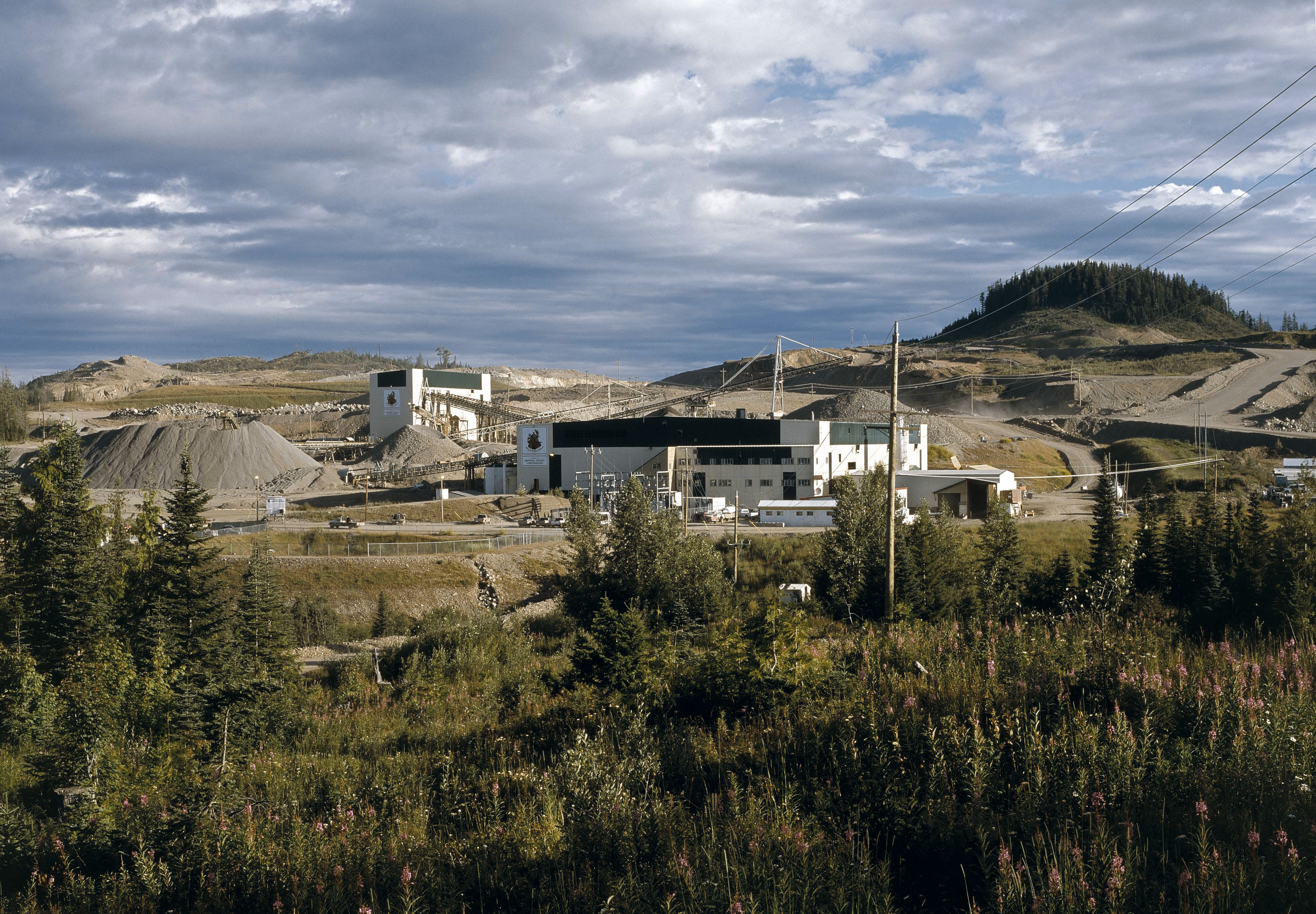
- Mount Polley mine

- Location in Canada
- Location: Quesnel Lake, British Columbia; 52°30′48″N 121°35′47″W
- Products: Copper; Gold; Silver
- Production: 38,501,165 pounds copper; 45,823 ounces gold; 123,999 ounces silver
- Financial year: 2013
- Discovered: 1969
- Opened: 1997
- Closed: 2019
- Company: Imperial Metals
- Website: Mount Polley Mine
- Acquired: 1980

Mount Polley mine is a Canadian gold and copper mine located in British Columbia near the towns of Williams Lake and Likely. It consists of two open-pit sites with an underground mining component and is owned and operated by the Mount Polley Mining Corporation, a wholly owned subsidiary of Imperial Metals. In 2013, the mine produced an output of 38,501,165 pounds (17,463,835 kg) of copper, 45,823 ounces of gold, and 123,999 of silver. The mill commenced operations in 1997 and was closed and placed on care and maintenance in 2019. The company owns 20,113 hectares (201.13 km^{2}) of property near Quesnel Lake and Polley Lake where it has mining leases and operations on 2,007 hectares (20.07 km^{2}) and mineral claims on 18,106 hectares (181.06 km^{2}). Mineral concentrate is delivered by truck to the Port of Vancouver.

As of January 2020, Mount Polley's Proven and Probable Reserves were 53.8 million tonnes of ore grading 0.34% copper, 0.30 grams per tonne gold and 0.9 grams per tonne silver, equating to 400 million pounds of copper, 517,000 troy ounces of gold and 1.55 million troy ounces of silver.

Mount Polley Mining Company reopened the mine in July 2022. Mount Polley Mining Company estimates that the reopening of the mine created 300 local jobs.

== Mining operations ==
When operating, the Mount Polley mine moves 80,000–90,000 tonnes of material per day from the mine. This contains 20,000 tonnes of ore.

Mount Polley does not require high-skilled labour for operations and hires and trains from the local communities of Big Lake, Horsefly and as far away as Quesnel and Williams Lake. Most workers come from communities near the mine.

=== Minerals ===
Mount Polley determines what qualifies as ore and what qualifies as waste using drilling and blasting. Ore is then sorted according to blast ball assays. High value sulfide ore is hauled to a crusher for processing at the on site plant. Chalcopyrite and bornite are the main copper-bearing minerals of value at the Mount Polley mine.

=== Processing ===
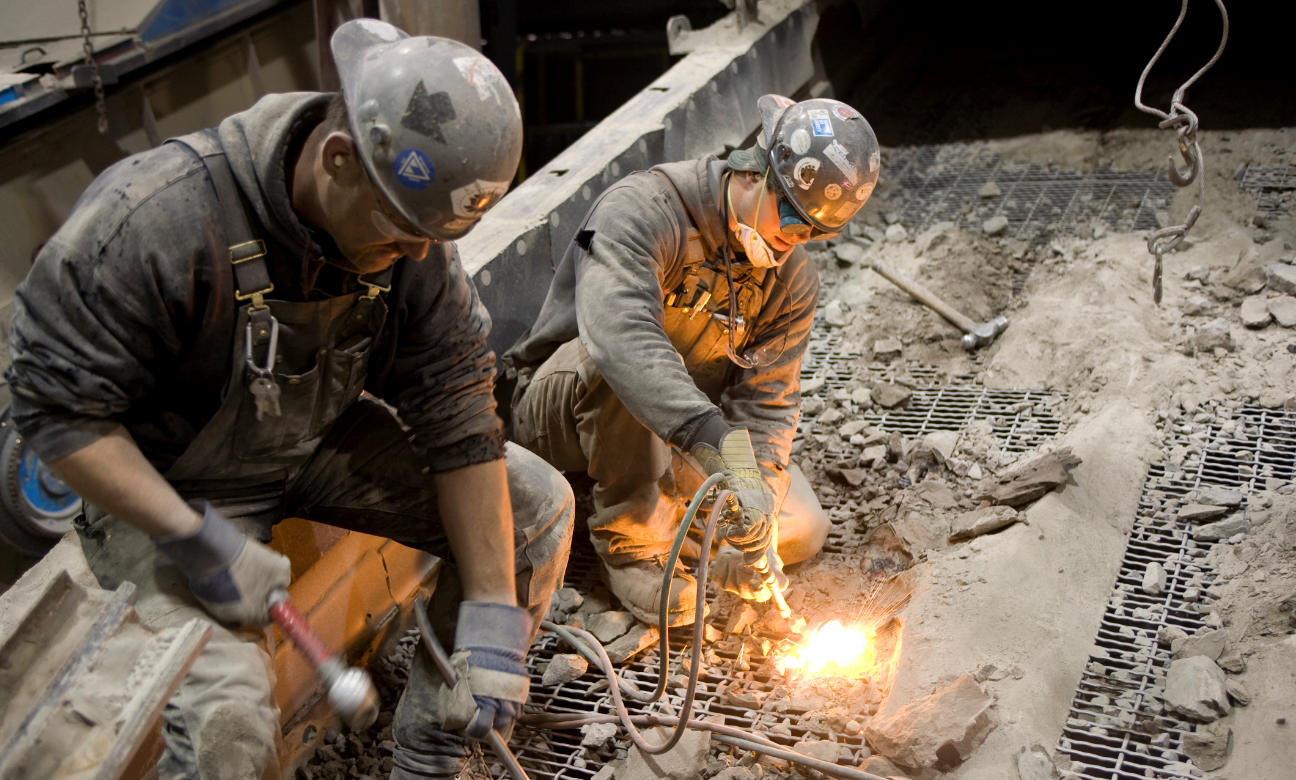
Workers at the Mount Polley mine

During operation, Mount Polley mine processes 20,000 tonnes of ore per day. The ore is sent for crushing, size reduction, and froth floatation.

==== Gold and copper ====
During assaying, the value of copper and the value of gold in the ore is determined and a monetary value per tonne is placed on the material. When this value exceeds a particular threshold, workers start processing the material.

Subsequently, the material is processed through a mill where the minerals get floated. In particular, the copper and gold minerals both float and are then concentrated. This process, called upgrading, creates a concentrated material that is approximately 23% copper. Gold is also captured in the concentrate.

=== Transportation ===
Mount Polley ships material, concentrated by floating, by truck to Vancouver when it is sent overseas to buyers who then smelt and refine the material.

=== Staff ===
During operation, Mount Polley runs four shifts. There is a day shift and a night shift each running twelve hours. Around 370 workers work these shifts seven days on and then get seven days off. About 50 staff include administrators, supervisors, warehouse operators, engineers, geologists, assayers, technical personnel, and human resources.

=== Care and maintenance shutdown and reopening ===
On 31 May 2019, Mount Polley mine was put on care and maintenance status. Remediation work in the areas affected by the 2014 breach has been the focus of Mount Polley's staff from 2014 to 2019. While the mine's closure affected mining operations, it did not impact the ongoing environmental monitoring and remediation programs.

Care and maintenance at the Mount Polley mine included management of the water treatment facilities and the operation of site water management systems, including pumps and ditches. Mount Polley monitors the stability of the tailings storage facility on a regular basis. Mount Polley employed 15 staff at the site while it operated in care and maintenance status.

The company reopened mine operations in July 2022.

== Geology ==
The Mount Polley mineralization is classified as an alkalic porphyry copper-gold deposit. The deposits are located in the Quesnel trough, a Mesozoic volcanic arc in the Canadian segment of the North American Cordillera. Precious metal mineralization in the two Mount Polley deposits occur the felsic stock occurred during the Jurassic-Triassic period. The copper-gold mineralization occurs within crackle and inclusion breccias.

== History ==
=== Pre-development ===
Placer mining, the mining of stream beds for minerals, was common practice in the area since the mid nineteenth century.

The Mount Polley ore deposit was discovered subsequent to an airborne magnetometer study completed by the Canadian government in 1964 which detected a significant reading for the surveyed map in the region of Polley Mountain. Investigating further, Karl Springer discovered an alkalic porphyry deposit there the same year.

Quintana Resources prospected the area in 1976, discovering numerous copper float boulders but let their claim to the property lapse in 1978. In 1980, E&B Exploration optioned the property from Highland Crow, a subsidiary of Teck. Through the early 1980s, the potential for gold mining on the site was explored due to the rising global price of the commodity.

The first feasibility study for the site was completed in 1991 and the first permits for developing the deposit were approved the same year. Financing from Imperial Metals however was not yet in place.

=== Mine opening ===
In 1997, the Mount Polley mine opened with the Cariboo pit being the first site developed. The tailings storage facility was also constructed the same year. In 2010, the underground portion of the mine was built and operations expanded.

During a mine closure between 2002 and 2005, a new location called the "Wight pit" was discovered in the northeast region of the site. The Wight Pit was named after former Mine Manager George Wight. The Wight pit is located 1.5 km northeast of the Cariboo and Bell pits and revealed the richest deposit on the site (10 million tonnes of .9% copper). The Wight Pit's distance from the Cariboo pit necessitated new permitting.

Subsequent to the discovery of the Wight Pit, after additional underground mining, another site was discovered and developed called "Martel Zone". It was named after former Environmental Coordinator Ron Martel.

== Mount Polley tailings pond breach ==
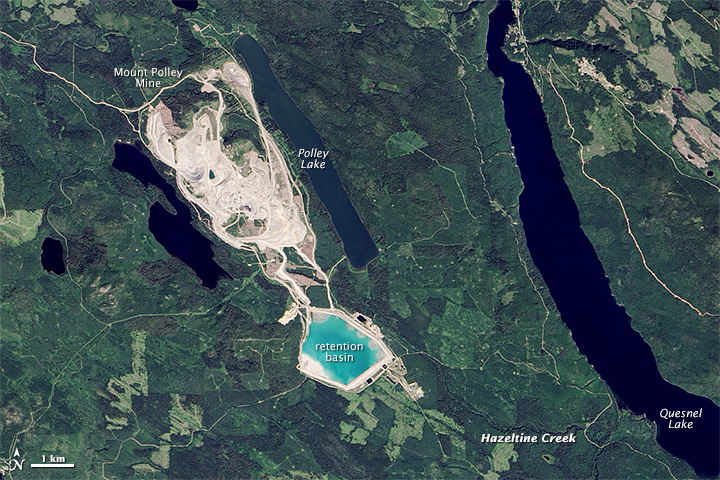
24 July 2014

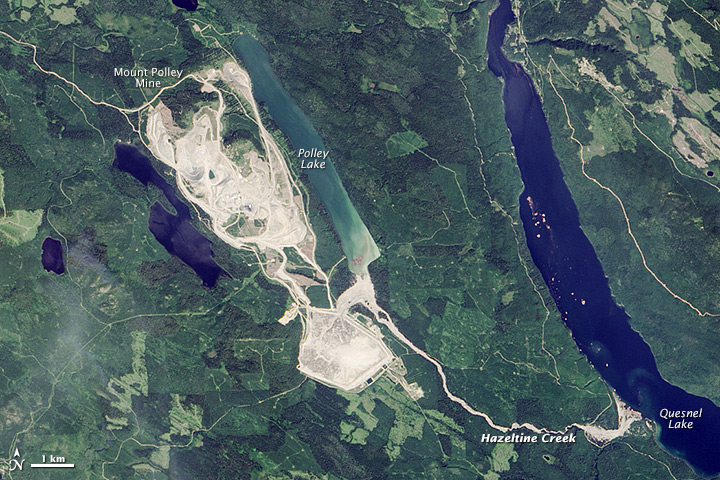
5 August 2014

The Mount Polley mine's tailings facility experienced a dam breach and tailings spill that began 4 August 2014. The four square kilometre tailings pond spilled an estimated 25 billion litres (25 million cubic meters) of contaminated materials into Polley Lake, Hazeltine Creek, Quesnel Lake, and Cariboo River, a source of drinking water and major spawning grounds for sockeye salmon. Quesnel Lake is claimed to be the deepest fjord lake in the world, the third deepest lake in North America, and is the major tributary of the Fraser River.

According to Mount Polley mine records filed with Environment Canada in 2013, there were “326 tonnes of nickel, over 400 tonnes of arsenic, 177 tonnes of lead and 18,400 tonnes of copper and its compounds placed in the tailings pond,” in 2012.

By 8 August the four-square-kilometre (1.5 sq mi) sized tailings pond had been emptied of the majority of "process water" from which the crushed rock solids, or "tailings", gradually settle out. The slurry of tailings and process water carried felled trees, mud and debris and wore away the banks of Hazeltine Creek which flows out of Polley Lake and continued into the nearby Quesnel Lake. The spill emptied the tailings pond and caused Polley Lake to rise by 1.5 metres (4.9 ft).

=== Effects of spill ===
Early reactions to the tailings spill expressed grave concern, but no fines or charges against Imperial Metals have been assessed. On August 6, two days after the breach, the British Columbia Ministry of Environment issued a Pollution Abatement Order to Mount Polley Mining Corporation. The company submitted an action plan for the Preliminary Environmental Impact Assessment, environmental monitoring. The company was required and did report weekly on the implementation of action plan measures.

A local state of emergency in nearby communities was initially declared in the interest of public safety with widespread water restrictions implemented and local equitable water distribution set up as a precautionary measure. Days later, some water use restrictions were removed for non-local residents, leaving a boiling water advisory, and narrowing the "Do Not Use" order to Polley Lake, Hazeltine Creek, and an area within 100 metres (330 ft) of the shoreline sediment deposit, where Hazeltine Creek runs into Quesnel Lake. Initial tests at five testing sites of the second water test run indicated zinc levels above chronic exposure limits for aquatic life, although rainbow trout toxicity test results from water collected at Quesnel Lake near the mouth of Hazeltine Creek on August 5 and 6 showed water was not toxic to rainbow trout.

Some tourism businesses in the adjacent surrounding areas remained open. Because the affected water system is salmon-bearing, there was a temporary closure of part of the Chinook salmon fishery by Fisheries and Oceans Canada. Complaints were filed with B.C.'s privacy commissioner regarding the release of environmental assessments and dam inspection reports after journalists found a report from 2010 and assessments from 1992 and 1997 in the public domain, the B.C. government has withheld subsequent reports. Following the event, some First Nations activists held protests and set up blockades. Several local landowners and business operators affected by the spill have launched legal challenges to seek compensation for damages.

=== Investigation and cause of spill ===
On 18 August 2014, the British Columbia government ordered an independent engineering investigation into the pond breach and a third-party review of all 2014 dam safety inspections for every permitted mine's tailings pond in the province. The report found that the tailings dam collapsed because of its construction on underlying earth containing a layer of glacial till, which had been unaccounted for by the company's original engineering contractor.

The report investigated whether the piezometers measuring the water pressure on the dam had been located correctly, as the last readings, 2 August 2014, did not show any changes in the water pressure. In 2010, Mount Polley Mining Corporation's (MPMC) engineering firm reported a 10-metre (33 ft) crack in the earthen dam while working to raise it, and that piezometers were broken, which were later fixed.

In 2018, three engineers who worked on the tailings storage facility were charged by their professional association with negligence or unprofessional conduct.

=== Clean-up efforts ===
Clean up efforts have led to a reconstructed Hazeltine Creek, although the contaminated slurry that made its way into Polley Lake and Quesnel Lake remains in the waterways. A drinking water ban was lifted within weeks of the spill and regular water testing is being conducted by the B.C. government, the Mount Polley mine, the University of Northern British Columbia and local residents.

Other remediation and reconstruction efforts have included investigation on impacts to human health and safety and affected ecosystems while removing the tailings spill, reconstructing creek shorelines, installing fish habitats, and replanting trees and other local vegetation. Investigation by the remediation team showed elevated levels of selenium, arsenic and other metals.

==== Water management and treatment ====
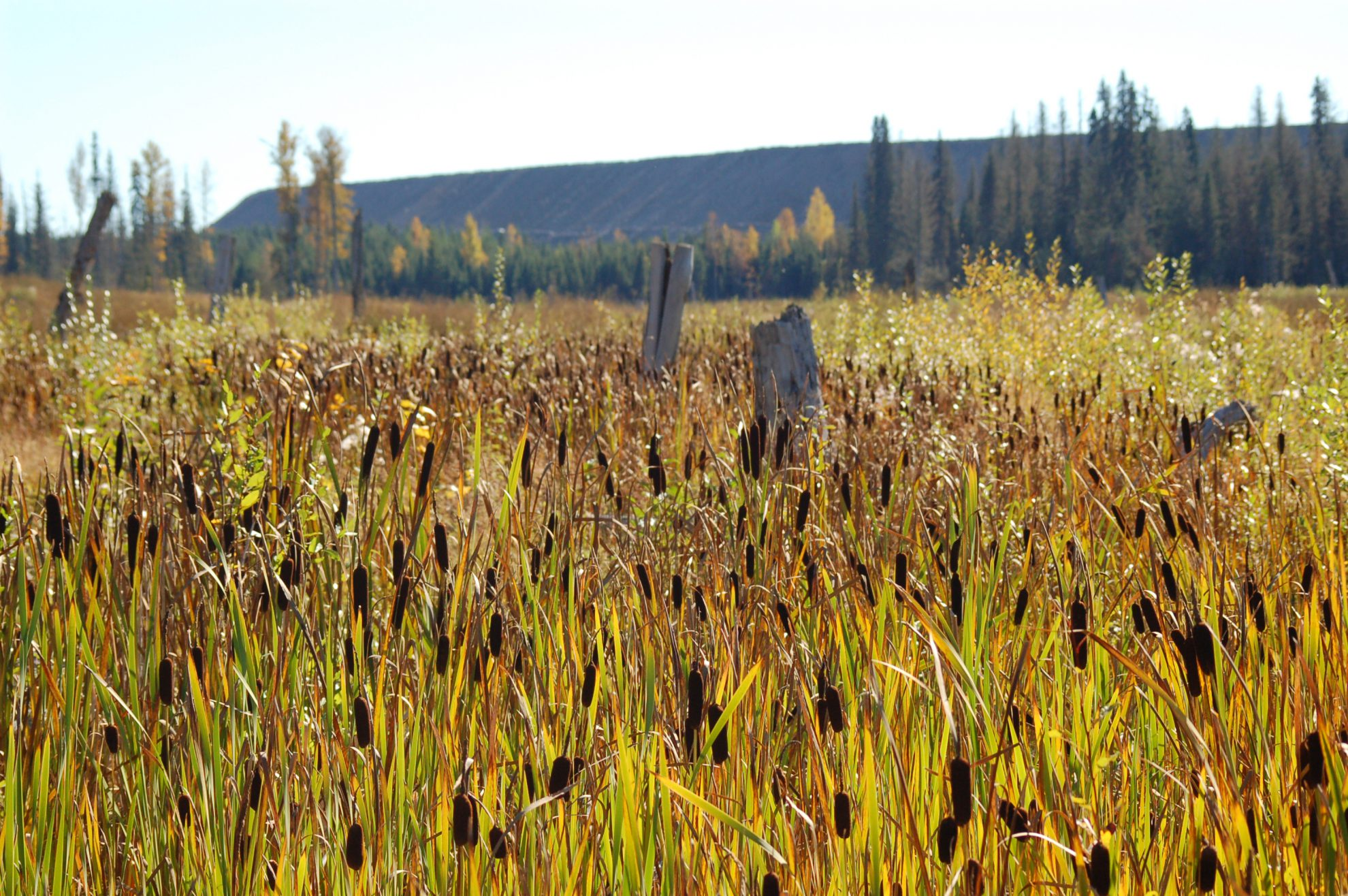
Remediated wetlands at Mount Polley

The long-term water management plan for the Mount Polley mine site has been approved by an independent statutory-decision maker from the Ministry of Environment and is expected to be fully in place by fall 2017 and will replace the short-term water management plan that has been in place since 30 November 2015.

Mount Polley Mining Corporation submitted its formal permit amendment application, which included the long-term water management plan and supporting Technical Assessment Report, in October 2016. The documents were subject to extensive public consultation, including First Nations and local communities. The application also underwent a full technical review from the Cariboo Mine Development Review Committee (CMDRC), which includes representatives from provincial and federal agencies, First Nations, local governments (City of Williams Lake and Cariboo Regional District), and the community of Likely.

The Mount Polley Mining Corporation (MPMC) treats mine site water with water treatment plant technology by Veolia prior to release into Quesnel lake. The water is monitored for turbidity at 15 second intervals and water quality is assessed at Quesnel lake as part of MPMC's Comprehensive Environmental Monitoring Plan. About 15,000 cubic meters of site water is discharged into Quesnel lake per day. This is below the 29,000 cubic meters threshold allowed under the mining corporation's permit. The water at Quesnel lake, Quesnel river, Polley lake, and Hazeltine creek are regularly monitored by the Ministry of Environment.

==== Remediation timeline ====
Fishing on Polley Lake in 2019. Fish habitats were installed on middle and upper Hazeltine Creek during remediation efforts after the Mount Polley dam breach

The Mount Polley Mining Corporation has invested more than $70 million into remediation efforts since the dam breach in 2014. No government funding has been spent on the clean-up or repair work at the site. The restoration and remediation strategy was carried out in four stages: impact reduction, post-breach environmental assessment, long-term health and environmental assessment, and implementation of work focused on remediation to prevent environmental and health impacts and to improve the condition of the areas affected by breach.

===== 2014 =====
In August, MPMC submitted an interim erosion plan and a sediment control plan to mitigate ongoing erosion and sediment transport downstream, to control further flow from the tailings area, and to improve the quality of water flowing into Quesnel Lake. In the beginning of September 2014, a berm to prevent further spread of tailings was nearing completion and laid off workers, about 40 of the mine's approximately 300 workers demanded to reopen the mine. a spokesman at the Ministry of Mine said operations would require permits and approvals and could only go ahead after a rigorous review. The primary phase of the restoration and remediation strategy implemented work to reduce the environmental effect on Quesnel Lake.

===== 2015 =====
Remediation work to restore wetlands was a priority of the Mount Polley Remediation strategy

In June 2015, the Post-Event Environmental Impact Assessments Report was published as part of the second phase of the strategy. The report was submitted by Golder Associates to the Mount Polley Mining Corporation to determine the physical, biological, and chemical implications 6–8 months after the dam breach. The report detailed steps taken by the MPMC to stabilize the tailings storage facility by creating two rock berms inside the facility, to provide safe access to Hazeltine creek by reducing the elevation of Polley Lake behind the point of the blockage caused by the discharge of tailings effluent, and to stop inputs from the tailings storage facility. Specialists and environmental scientists and engineers were hired to study the impact of the spill from the tailings dam. This team studied where tailings effluent was deposited on land and in surrounding water environments, in particular how the bottom of Quesnel Lake was affected and how the structures of Hazeltine and Edney creeks had changed. Chemical studies studied soil, water and sediment changes, while biological studies were focused on the effect of aquatic plant and animal life, in particular those at the sediment layer. Biological assessment also studied soil-dependent biota in the areas surrounding Quesnel Lake and Polley Lake.

The Assessments Report determined nine areas requiring ongoing monitoring to determine localized strategies for remediation efforts in each location. These areas included the tailings storage facility, the Polley plug (a blockage area between the tailings effluent and Polley Lake), Polley Lake, upper Hazeltine creek, Hazeltine Canyon, lower Hazeltine creek, the mouth of Edney creek, Quesnel Lake, and Quesnel River.

The report concluded that Polley Lake, Hazeltine Creek and a small portion of Quesnel Lake were physically affected by the tailings dam breach. The chemical testing on the tailings mixture was determined to be relatively inert though it was found that a higher concentration of copper was contained in the effluent compared to before the breach. Biological testing found copper contained within lake sediment and within the water was not toxic to aquatic life. Soil testing of copper levels determined a level higher than provincial standards for the protection of invertebrates and plants but at far lower levels than the provincial standards for the protection of human health. Deep water analysis found copper to be at levels below the Provincial Water Quality Guideline. Despite the levels of copper present due to presence in the tailings, the report determined it was unlikely to be released from the tailings and therefore adverse effects were deemed unlikely.

The restoration of the shoreline of Hazeltine creek began to create a stable water flow and to begin the restoration of fish and associated wildlife habitats. This was preceded by floodplain grading and the determination of the physical land characteristics of the areas surrounding the shoreline. A flow study to determine an ideal range and the annual mean for natural habitats was completed before construction of rock weirs and habitat features. Planting on the floodplain, to continue over subsequent years had also begun. Repairs to the mouth of lower Edney Creek was completed connecting the waterway to Quesnel Lake. By the spring of 2015, remediation work had installed a new fish habitat at lower Edney Creek. Successful spawning of interior Coho, Kokanee and Sockeye Salmon was accomplished. By May, a new channel for Hazeltine Creek was completed.

On 13 July 2015, Interior Health, the regional public health authority, declared all water restrictions lifted and determined water sourced from Polley Lake and Hazeltine Creek safe for consumption and recreation from a health perspective. A review of the water, sediment and fish toxicology samples from the Ministry of the Environment determined no known risks to human health.

===== 2016 =====
A detailed site investigation was completed by Golder Associates in January 2016 as mandated by the Pollution Abatement Order issued by the British Columbia Ministry of Environment. This work was part of investigation and remediation work ongoing at the Mount Polley site. The detailed site investigation was completed to produce a Human Health Risk Assessment (HHRA) report and an Ecological Risk Assessment for the affected site.

The Post-Event Environmental Impact Assessment Report update was completed in June 2015 by Golder Associates.

Remediation work was conducted in tandem with investigative work done by Golder.

The Human Health Risk Assessment (HHRA) was completed by Golder Associates as part of that company's work toward implementing the Mount Polley remediation strategy. The produced report detailed current recreational and commercial uses of Polley Lake, Quesnel Lake, and Quesnel River and their environs including fisheries, swimming, boating, kayaking, canoeing, waterskiing, snowmobiling, and ice fishing. The report also noted the use of Quesnel Lake as a source of drinking water for nearby residences. As such the report investigated effect of the dam breach on human health, in particular subsistence land users, Quesnel Lake residents, and recreational land users.

The HHRA report found that soil, surface water, and the air did not contain contaminants of particular concern that were present or that exceeded contaminated site regulations. The sediment layer exceeded the regulatory standard for lead, while vegetation had copper and vanadium present, and aluminum, copper, and vanadium were present in the fish.

The HHRA report concluded that the risks were low to subsistence land users, recreational land users, loggers, and workers on site. Further, the human health risks associated with the tailings storage facility embankment breach were considered to be "very low". Groundwater did contain metals that exceeded drinking water standards including iron, manganese, arsenic, molybdenum, and sulfate. However, no wells that supply groundwater exist in the Hazeltine Corridor.

===== 2017 =====
The HHRA report was published in May. The Ecological Risk Assessment (ERA) report was published in December and detailed the work done by Golder to understand the ecological significance of the tailings dam breach of 2014. The ERA report was completed as a component of the MPMC's remediation strategy to help inform rehabilitation work in affected areas. The ERA considered levels of metal contaminants in the soil, water, and sediment. Territorial and Aquatic risk assessments were concluded as part of the investigative work of the report. The report found excess concentrations of copper and vanadium in the soil however it was determined that the tailings were not acid generating and were unlikely to leach metals. The ERA determined the cause of some tree death post-breach and attributed a root smothering effect of the tailings effluent in the forested region. It was determined that tailings decreased soil aeration causing a poor environment for soil biota to support tree growth and survival. The food chain of local wildlife was modeled to determine if copper and vanadium exceeded standards. The cumulative dose according to these models was determined to be below a conservative threshold for most wildlife species. The report concluded low risk associated with copper and vanadium contamination. The bioavailability of the metals was likewise determined to be low. As part of the aquatic risk assessment, copper and arsenic were investigated in the sediment, while copper was the contaminant of potential concern investigated in the water of Polley Lake, Hazeltine Creek, Quesnel Lake, and Quesnel River. It was determined that copper levels decreased below the accepted guideline through 2015 in both lakes and Quesnel River, but not in Hazeltine Creek which was the site of active remediation and restructuring. The plants, water-column invertebrates, and fish in Polley Lake and Quesnel Lake are not expected to face long-term effects of the 2014 breach, according to ERA report. Likewise, risk to fish-consuming wildlife was also determined to be low. The deep ecological benthic ecosystem was also considered to have little risk from copper as a limiting factor in the recovery of these organisms at the sediment layer. The ERA concluded that ecological risks associated with metals released by the dam breach and tailings spill are low.

===== 2018 =====
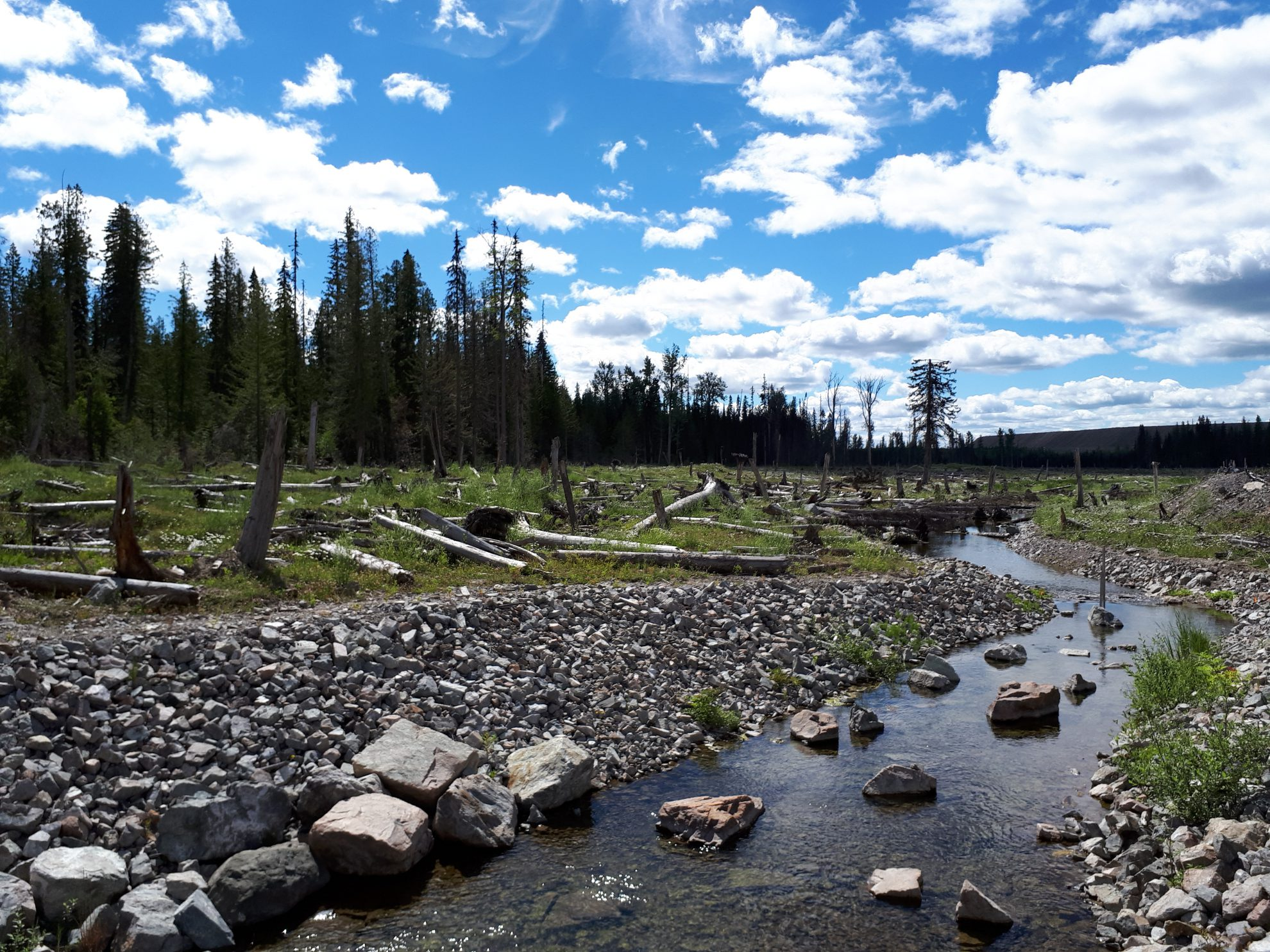
Remediation of Hazeltine Creek at Mount Polley included shoreline restoration and establishment of fish habitats

Over 6 kilometers of new fish spawning and rearing habitats were installed in upper to middle Hazeltine Creek. The successful spawning of Rainbow Trout was later observed in 2018 and 2019 in upper Hazeltine Creek.

===== 2019 =====
The Remediation Plan was prepared by Golder Associates for the MPMC and was submitted to the British Columbia Ministry of Environment & Climate Change Strategy. This was the final requirement of the Pollution Abatement Order which was lifted on 12 September 2019. The Mount Polley Review Panel determined that the environmental effect of the dam breach and tailing spill was the physical disruption of the effluents rather than chemical. MPMC turned its remediation focus to restoring the physical state of the affected sites. The remediation efforts include ongoing planting of trees and shrubs that are native to the local ecosystem in the riparian and upland areas along Hazeltine Creek. The Mount Polley remediation efforts have replanted 600,000 trees and shrubs to date. The risk from chemical contamination on the site was determined to be low to very low in the relevant terrestrial and aquatic environments. Remediation efforts also repaired 400 metres of shoreline at Quesnel Lake and installed new fish habitats at that site. New wetlands were also installed at the site next to the tailings pond failure.

==== Government monitoring, impact, and inspection ====
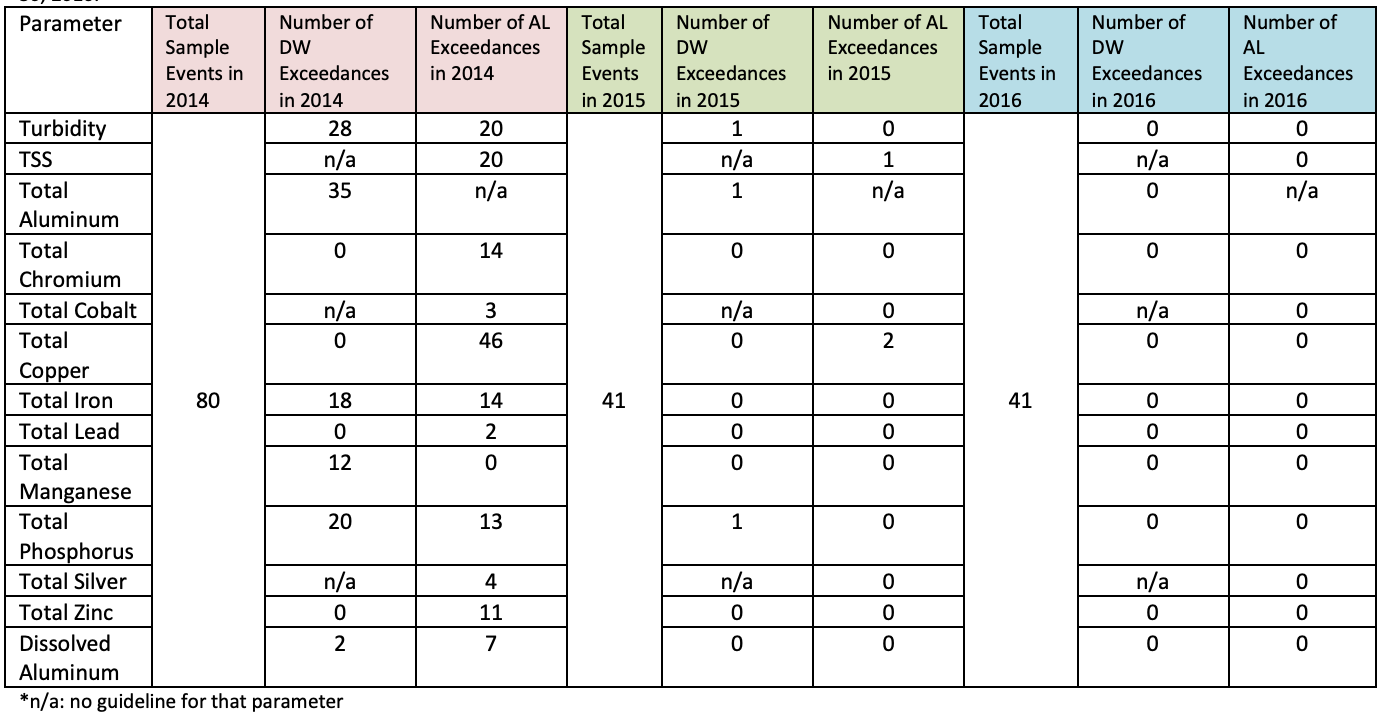
Number of exceedances for both drinking water and aquatic life guidelines from all BC Ministry of Environment sample events from August 4, 2014, to August 30, 2016, at Quesnel Lake, British Columbia. Data shows 0 exceedances of listed contaminants by end of 2016.

In 2010, provincial government funding was cut for resource management. Preceding the dam breach, Mount Polley was inspected 2013, but not 2011 or 2012. Bill Bennett, Minister of Energy and Mines, said "there is no evidence that the government's missed inspections were related to the failure of the dam [in 2014]".

According to an Imperial Metals summary filed with Environment Canada in 2013, "there was 326 tonnes of nickel, over 400 tonnes of arsenic, 177 tonnes of lead and 18,400 tonnes of copper and its compounds placed in the tailings pond [last year]". At a community meeting on 5 August 2014, the president of Imperial Metals stated "we regularly perform toxicity tests and we know this water is not toxic to rainbow trout."

Water, sediment, and fish in Polley and Quesnel Lake are monitored by British Columbia government staff at the Ministry of Environment. Fish sampling in the months immediately proceeding the tailing spill revealed elevated levels of selenium that exceed guidelines for human consumption, though elevated levels of arsenic and copper were not considered a threat to human health. These levels were similar to levels found in 2013 before the tailings breach and considered likely due to local geology. Sediment testing near the tailings spill revealed elevated concentrations of copper, iron, manganese, arsenic, silver, selenium and vanadium. Yet, the government said tests in May 2014, prior to the tailings release, had shown elevated levels of the same elements. By 2016, Ministry of Environment testing determined zero exceedances of its guideline levels for contaminants for both aquatic life and drinking water in Quesnel Lake.

In the years after the tailing spill, the extent of the impact of the event has been largely determined. The British Columbia Ministry of Environment provides ongoing water monitoring of pH, conductivity, turbidity, total suspended solids, total dissolved solids, total organic carbon, hardness, alkalinity, nutrients, general ions, total and dissolved metals at the site.

== Imperial Metals history ==
Imperial Metals & Power Ltd was incorporated in British Columbia in December 1959. The company owns the Mount Polley open pit copper mine and gold mine, the Huckleberry open pit copper mine near Houston, British Columbia, and the Ruddock Creek zinc/lead project, near Kamloops, British Columbia. In 2019, Imperial Metals sold its 70% stake in the Red Chris copper/gold mine to Newcrest for $804 million retaining a 30% interest in the mine.

Imperial Metals temporarily suspended operations of the Mount Polley mine in 2019 due to declining copper prices. Environmental remediation work continues at the site. The mine's closure affects 250 workers and is the second cessation of work due to global copper prices. The first such closure occurred in 2001 and lasted until 2005.

== See also ==
- List of copper mines
- List of copper mines in Canada
- List of gold mines in Canada
- Gibraltar Mine
- New Afton mine
- Coleman Mine
- Highland Valley Copper mine
- Canadian Malartic Mine
- LaRonde mine
