= Robert McLeese =

Canadian politician

Member of the Legislative Assembly of British Columbia
- In office 1882–1888
- Constituency: Cariboo

Personal details
- Born: June 28, 1828 near Coleraine, Ireland
- Died: March 27, 1898 (aged 69) Soda Creek, British Columbia
- Party: Independent
- Occupation: hotel proprietor, store owner

Robert McLeese (June 28, 1828 – March 27, 1898) was an Irish-born hotel keeper, store owner, owner of a sternwheel river boat and political figure in British Columbia. He represented Cariboo in the Legislative Assembly of British Columbia from 1882 to 1888.

He was born near Coleraine in 1828, the son of John McLeese and Jennie McArthur, both of Scottish descent, and was educated in Dublin. McLeese moved to Philadelphia, Pennsylvania, where some of his relative had already settled. After seven years there, he went to California via Panama. In 1858, McLeese came to British Columbia, settling at New Westminster. Five years later, he moved to the Cariboo District, settling at Soda Creek. McLeese married Mary McLaren in 1873. He served as postmaster for Soda Creek, the post office being located in his hotel. McLeese ran unsuccessfully for a seat in the assembly in an 1879 by-election held following the death of John Evans. He resigned his seat in the assembly in 1888 to run unsuccessfully for a seat in the House of Commons of Canada. McLeese died in Soda Creek in 1898; his death record states his age as 69.

McLeese Lake, originally named Mud Lake, was renamed in his honour; the community of the same name was named because of the lake.
