= Takla Group =

Group of volcanic rocks in British Columbia, Canada

The Takla Group is a group of basalt and andesite lava flows, pyroclastic rocks, volcanogenic sandstones and argillites in north-central British Columbia, Canada, covering more than 30,000 km^{2} (12,000 sq mi) of the Stikinia terrane in a belt up to 50 km (31 mi) wide and over 800 km (500 mi) long.

== See also ==
- Volcanism of Canada
- Volcanism of Western Canada
