= Cerro de San Pedro =

Coordinates: 22°13′N 100°48′W

- Municipality
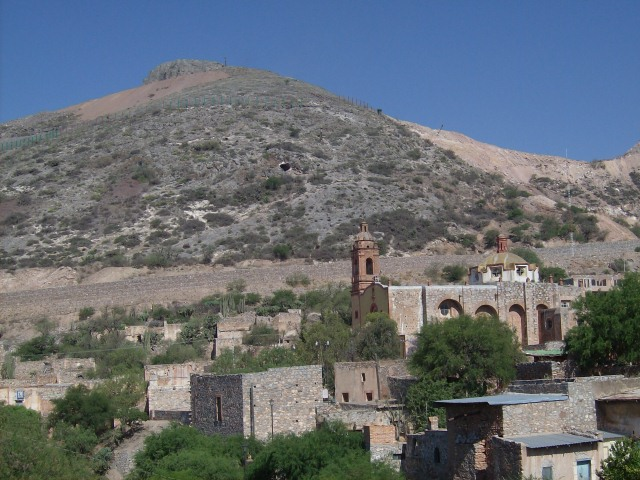

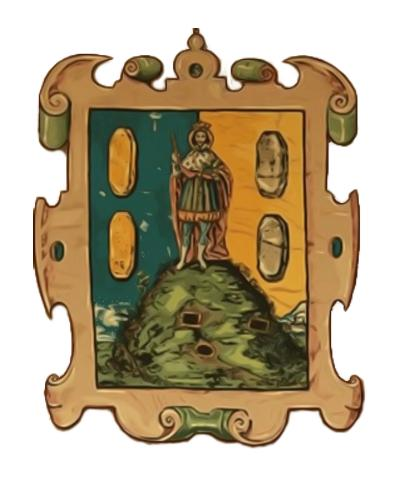
- Coat of arms

- Location in Mexico Cerro de San Pedro (Mexico)
- Country: Mexico
- State: San Luis Potosí
- Demonym: (in Spanish)
- Time zone: UTC−6 (CST)

Cerro de San Pedro is a village and seat of the municipality of Cerro de San Pedro, located in the central Mexican state of San Luis Potosí. It is located in hills, 5 kilometres (3.1 mi) northeast of the city of San Luis Potosí.

As of 2005, the population was 95. The townsite is now threatened by the new and adjacent open pit gold mining operations.

== Geography ==
=== Location ===
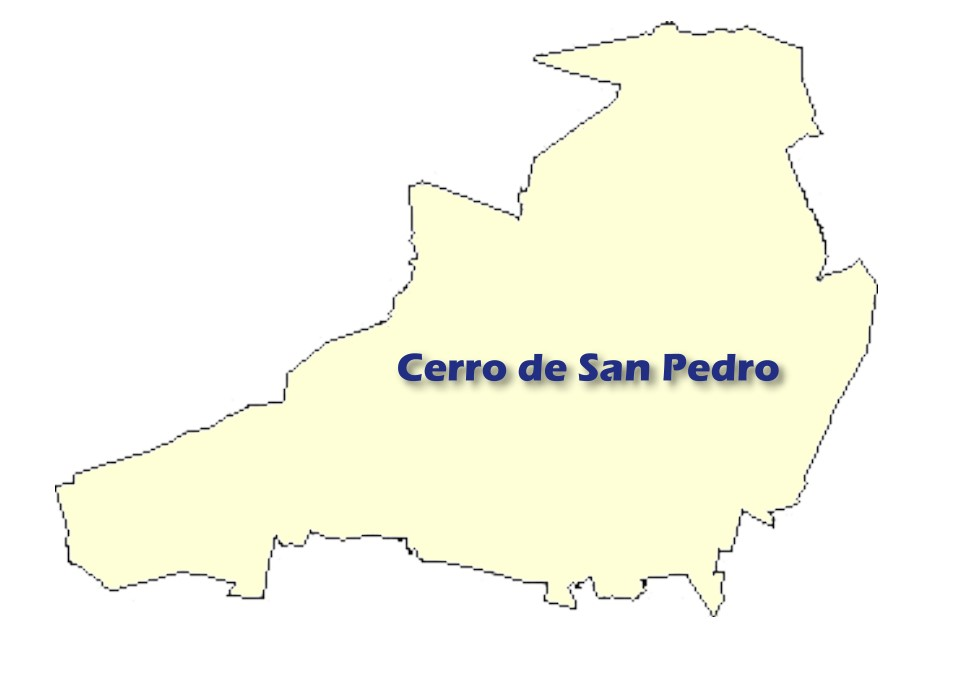
Map of Cerro de San Pedro Municipality

The village is located in the central part of the state, at 2,040 metres (6,690 ft) above sea level. The village borders Soledad de Graciano Sánchez on the north and west, Armadillo de los Infante on the east, and San Luis Potosí city on the southwest, and Villa de Zaragoza on the south. The co-ordinates of the center of the village are 100° 49’ west longitude and 22° 13’ north latitude.

== History ==
The hills were in the homelands of the indigenous Chichimeca people and Guachichil people during the pre-Columbian era.

The village started as a Spanish colonial mining settlement for gold and silver, and was formally established in 1592. It was the founding settlement of the state, and a symbol of its mineral rich hill is prominent in the state's coat of arms. Unfortunately, the hill has disappeared in the 2010s, as a result of the new opencast mine consuming its mass and site.

=== Mining history ===
In 1592 padre Diego de la Magdalena met with some of the Guachichil peoples in the pueblo of Mesquitique. Among them was one man named Cualiname or Gualiname, who brought attention to the golden outlines in their face paintings. The missionary asked him where he had obtained this pigment, and was told there was much of the powder to the east of Mesquitique.

Magdalena told Padre Francisco Franco about this discovery, who then told Captain Miguel Caldera, who took possession of the place from the indigenous peoples for the Viceroyalty of New Spain. Captain Caldera sent Gregorio de León, Juan de la Torre, and Pedro de Anda to verify the existence of the minerals. The latter named the locality San Pedro del Potosí, to honor his namesake saint and in memory of the famous mines of the Potosí in Upper Peru of the Viceroyalty of Peru, in present-day Bolivia.

Gold and silver were found in and around the hills of San Pedro, but there was not enough local water to support mining operations. The nearest water source was to the north in the homelands of the Chichimeca people. Hindrances were overcome by 1624, and the mines were rich producers of gold and silver for centuries. The Mesoamerican historian Primo Feliciano Velázquez y Basalenque included extensive descriptions of the Cerro de San Pedro area in his accounts.

==== Main shafts ====
- San Pedro shaft
- Juarez shaft
- Begonia shaft

== Contemporary mining ==
In the 20th century the mines were operated by several companies, including the Metalúrgica Mexicana subsidiary of American Smelting and Refining Company (ASARCO) beginning in 1928. A miners' strike occurred in 1948 for improved conditions and pay, but the miners lost. ASARCO decided to leave, but not before destructively collapsing the main shafts and tunnels, though the mines were never declared exhausted. Canadian mining company Metallica Resources acquired the mines in the latter 20th century.

The mines were acquired by Canadian New Gold Inc., through the Mexican subsidiary Minera San Xavier (MSX), from Metallica Resources in 1997.

=== Open pit mine ===
In 1999, after notable local and national opposition and assassinated opponents, the Cerro de San Pedro Mine was restarted for gold mining by New Gold/MSX, though as an open pit mine instead of using underground methods. There was/is significant opposition because the open pit would be/is in an area that was declared an area of colonial monuments in 1972 as well as a wildlife preservation zone in 1993.

In 1997, MSX had received an authorization from local authorities to start the mining project. In 1999, the Mexican Ministry of Environment and Natural Resources (SEMARNAT) granted MSX an environmental permit to conduct mining operations. After MSX was granted the mining permits, an ongoing legal struggle between MSX and diverse groups opposing the project started (est. 2003).

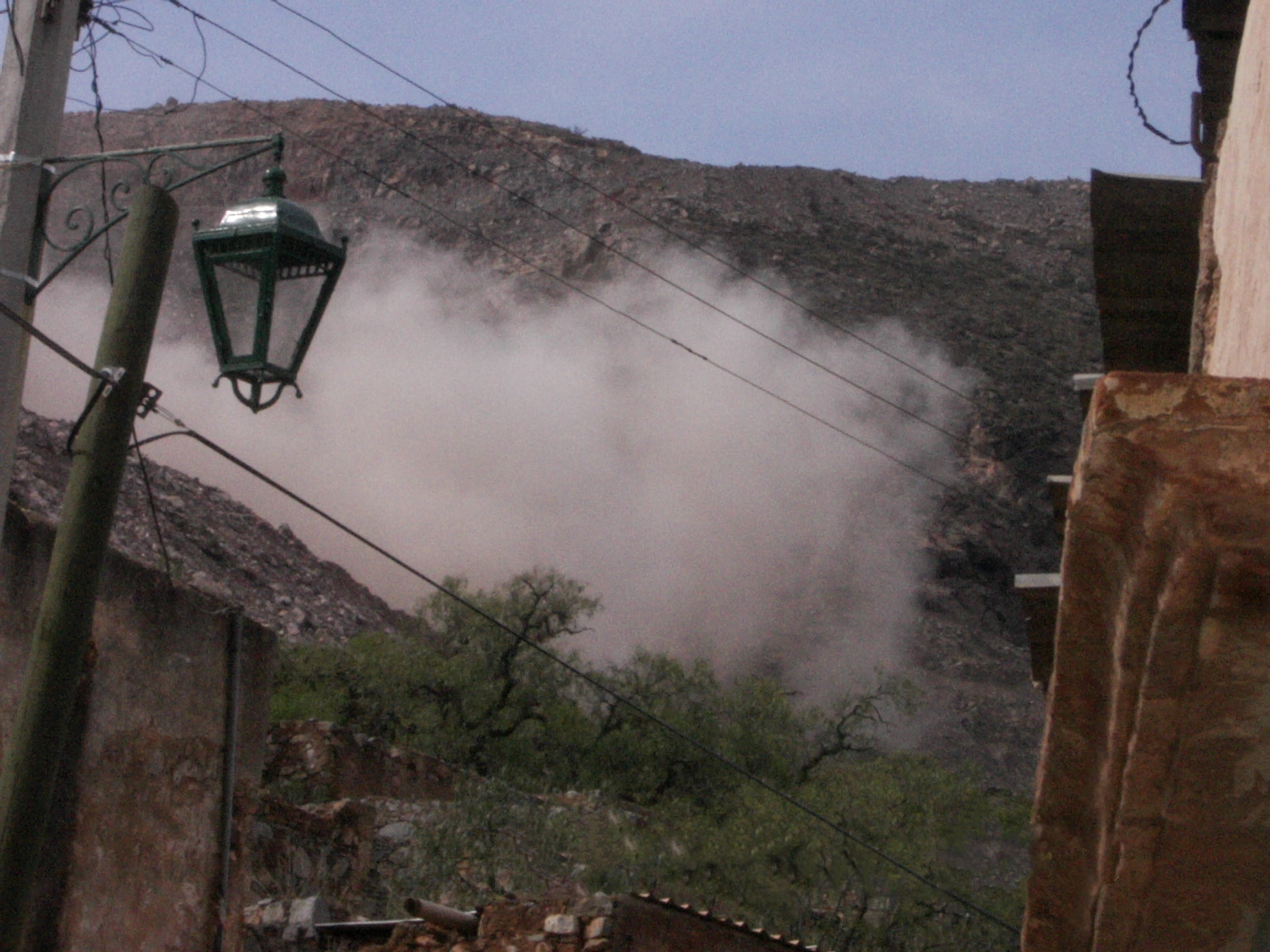
Explosion for open pit mining next to the town.

In March 2004, the Unitary Agrarian Tribunal rejected the lease MSX had been using since 1999 to operate in ejidal lands because they had used falsified signatures. Then in 2004, the National Defense Secretariat gave MSX authorization to use of explosives, which violated a previous decree issued by the Second District Court. Then in 2004, the National Institute of Anthropology and History (INAH) presented a lawsuit against MSX, stating that historical monuments had been damaged by the new use of explosives. The nearby central historic district of the city of San Luis Potosí is part of a UNESCO World Heritage Site. Finally in 2004, the Supreme Tribunal of Fiscal and Administrative Justice cancelled the environmental permit granted to MSX by the SEMARNAT in 1999, ruling that a permit never should have been granted. MSX requested an appeal and continued to operate. In 2005 the appeal was rejected and the Supreme Tribunal ratified the cancellation of the environmental permit. The mine was closed.

In 2006, after president Vicente Fox publicly announced his support for MSX, the Mexican government granted them a new environmental permit. In 2010 the Supreme Tribunal nullified the permit granted to MSX in 2006 and the Environment Federal Agency (PROFEPA) closed the mine for the second time. In September 2009 the Mexican Federal Tribunal of Administrative and Fiscal Justice unequivocally declared the 2006 environmental Change of Land Use permit necessary to operate the mine “null and void". In a November 2009 press release, [ MSX−New Gold Inc: 2 November press release MSX misinformed the shareholders and public it had filed an appeal.

In late 2010 the SEMARNAT issued MSX a new permit, despite strong local opposition, and the mine began operating again. 25 tons of explosives are detonated daily, and the namesake hill, Cerro de San Pedro, no longer exists.

== Towns ==
The villages and colonias in the Cerro de San Pedro Municipality include:

- Cerro de San Pedro (Cabecera Municipal, municipal seat)
- Portezuelo
- Real del Potosi
- Monte De Caldera
- Cuesta de Campa
- La Zapatilla
- Divisadero
- Calderon
- Jesus Maria
- Joyita de la Cruz
- La Florida
- Granjas de San Pedro
- Granjas de la Florida
- Planta del Carmen
