= Mesquite Mine =

Gold mine in California

Coordinates: 33.060318°N 114.994413°W

The Mesquite Mine, operated by Equinox Gold, is located near Glamis, Imperial County, California. It is one of the largest gold mines in the United States.

== History ==
Felizario Parra discovered gold in April 1876, worked placers until 1880, and sold out for $3000.00. Dry washing of low grade ores continued intermittently for 100 years, along with many exploratory shafts. From 1957 to 1980, Dick and Anna Singer mined, recorded earlier efforts, made studies, and sold their findings to Gold Fields Mining Corporation. After investing 70 million in exploration, development and construction, Gold Fields began full-scale production in March 1986. Production reached 207,897 ounces of gold in 1992. It was expected that this rate of production would be maintained through 1999 when the mine would be subsequently exhausted. Gold Fields and Santa Fe Pacific Gold Corporation, which had given steady employment to approximately 300 persons, contributed heavily to public and private needs and operated with full environmental issues until it was acquired by New Gold Inc. In 2001, the mine closed due to a fall in gold prices, but it was reopened in 2007.
