= Glamis, California =

Unincorporated community in California, United States

Glamis
- Unincorporated community
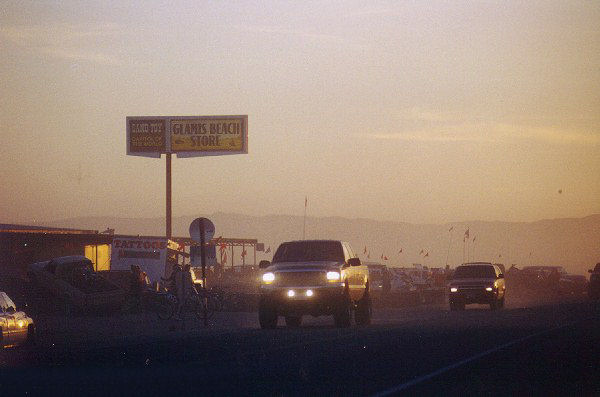
- Glamis, California at dusk, November 2000

- Location in California Glamis (the United States)
- Coordinates: 32°59′51″N 115°04′19″W
- Country: United States
- State: California
- County: Imperial County
- Elevation: 335 ft (102 m)
- Postal code: 92283

Glamis is an unincorporated community in Imperial County, California. It is located 22 miles (35 km) northeast of Holtville, at an elevation of 335 feet (102 m).

Glamis (GLA-MIS) also mispronounced as (GLE-MIS), is one of a series of former Southern Pacific railroad stops along the eastern edge of the Algodones Dunes, located where the railway crosses State Route 78; other former stops in this area include Acolita, Clyde, Ruthven and Ogilby.

Glamis has virtually no permanent structures aside from the "Glamis Store", "Boardmanville Trading Post" and "Glamis Dunes Storage"; the latter is the sole place fuel is readily available for the hundreds of thousands of recreational visitors each year (many of them ORV users) who pass through the Algodones Dunes and the associated Imperial Sand Dunes Recreation Area, located in the southern portion of the dune system. The name "Glamis" or "Glamis Dunes" is often used to refer to either or both of these areas, though technically this is incorrect.

Glamis's post office operated from 1886 to 1888, 1899 to 1901, 1917 to 1920, 1921 to 1923, and from 1940. The community was named for Glamis Castle in Scotland, which was made famous by the Shakespearean play Macbeth.

Glamis is the closest community to the new Mesquite Regional Landfill, a waste-by-rail landfill being constructed for municipal trash primarily originating at the Puente Hills Intermodal Facility in Los Angeles County, and the Mesquite Mine, a gold mine.
