= Metallica Resources =

Metallica Resources Inc.
- Type: Defunct public
- Industry: Industrial Metals & Minerals
- Headquarters: Toronto, Ontario, Canada
- Key people: Richard J. Hall
- Number of employees: 40
- Website: www.metal-res.com

Metallica Resources Inc. was a Canadian-based mineral and gold mining company.

Metallica Resources was a publicly held Canadian mineral exploration and development company with a geographic focus in the Americas. The company had an ownership interest in a gold project at Cerro de San Pedro Mexico. This project generated legal challenges and concerted opposition by local citizens and organizations across Mexico and North America. The concerns were that the open-pit cyanide leach-pit process used by the project would produce irreparable harm to the environment and historical patrimony of this region in Mexico. Over the years, Mexican courts suspended or revoked various permits for Metallica's Cerro de San Pedro project. There were fourteen cases before the Mexican courts awaiting resolution. The Cerro de San Pedro case was also reviewed by the Commission for Environmental Cooperation (CEC). In addition, the company had a significant copper-gold project in Chile. Metallica's corporate goal was to build shareholder value through growth of its existing assets and pursuit of quality investment opportunities.

The company was acquired by New Gold Inc., and delisted from the Toronto Stock Exchange effective July 4, 2008.

== See also ==
- Gold as an investment
