= Gibraltar Mine =

Copper mine in British Columbia, Canada

- Location
- Location: McLeese Lake, British Columbia, Canada; 52°31′47.31″N 122°17′11.53″W
- Products: Copper; Molybdenum
- Production: 140 million pounds of copper; 2.6 million pounds of molybdenum
- Opened: 1972
- Company: Trekor Metals Limited (75%); Cariboo Copper (25%)
- Website: https://trekormetals.com/
- Acquired: 1999

Gibraltar Mine is a Canadian copper mine operated by Trekor Metals Limited near McLeese Lake in British Columbia, Canada. It is the second largest open-pit mine in Canada and the fourth largest in North America.

The mine is the largest employer in the Cariboo region.

Gibraltar was originally opened by Placer Development Ltd. of Vancouver in 1972. The property was sold in 1996 to Westmin Resources which closed the mine in 1998. In July 1999, Taseko Mines purchased Gibraltar and re-opened it in October 2004, taking over operations in 2006. Taseko Mines rebranded June 23 2026 to Trekor Metals Limited.

In May 2006, the Phase I expansion was announced. The concentrator capacity was increased from 36,750 to 46,000 tonnes per day (tpd) at a cost of $76 million. The phase II expansion – which began in May 2007 – saw the concentrator capacity increased from 46,000 to 55,000 tpd in a semi-autogenous grinding mill at a cost of $40 million. The mine went through addition upgrades during a third development phase which cost $325 million, increasing the design capacity of Gibraltar to 85,000 tpd.

Trekor reported reserves of 2.4 billion pounds of copper and 69 million pounds of molybdenum in 2007.

== See also ==
- List of copper mines in Canada
- Mount Polley mine
- Highland Valley Copper mine
- New Afton mine
