= Imperial Metals =

Canadian mining company

Imperial Metals Corporation
- Company type: Public
- Traded as: TSX: III
- Industry: Metals and Mining
- Founded: 1959 (as Imperial Metals and Power Ltd.)
- Headquarters: Vancouver, Canada
- Key people: J. Brian Kynoch, President and Director; N. Murray Edwards, Chairman
- Products: Gold, copper, zinc, lead, molybdenum
- Revenue: C$187.8 Million (2013)▼5.8%
- Net income: C$41.0 Million (2013)▲25.7%
- Website: www.imperialmetals.com

Imperial Metals Corporation, known as IMI Imperial Metals Inc. until 2002, is a Canadian metals and mining company. Engaging in the acquisition, exploration, development, mining, and production of base and precious metals in North America, the majority of its holdings and operations are in British Columbia.

In 2024 the Company produced 61,296,423 pounds copper and 57,051 ounces gold from the Mount Polley mine and its 30% interest in the Red Chris mine.

== Operations ==
Imperial owns, and has an interest in, two operating mines in British Columbia, one mine in care and maintenance in British Columbia, and two exploration stage projects also in British Columbia currently under development.

=== Mount Polley Mine ===
The Mount Polley mine located 100 km northeast of Williams Lake, British Columbia is an open pit copper/gold mine that started operation in 1997. In August 2014 the mine was the site of a dam breach. In the short term after the breach, the mining company faced protests by local activists including members of the Secwepemc Nation. The mine reopened in 2016 and closed again in 2019.

After a three year suspension of operations the mine recommenced operations in July 2022.

=== Red Chris Mine ===
Map of the Red Chris Mine Property

The Red Chris Mine is an operating open-pit copper/gold mine owned 30% by Imperial Metals and 70% by Newmont. The mine property is located outside of the community of Iskut, with the Klappan River flowing through the property less than 20 km from its confluence with the Stikine River. The mine's proximity to the Sacred Headwaters and the transboundary nature of environmental management in this region has raised concerns across the border on the Alaskan panhandle. On February 1, 2015, the Globe and Mail reported that commercial fisherman, native organizations, and the mayors of Sitka and Petersburg have released a joint statement requesting an "equal seat at the table with Canada in discussions about how and if watersheds shared by both countries are developed."

On July 23, 2025 it was announced that a rescue operation is to be undertaken for 3 miners trapped underground.
