= Taseko Mines =

Copper producer in British Columbia, Canada

Taseko Mines Limited
- Type: Public
- Traded as: TSX: TKO; AMEX: TGB
- Industry: Copper and Gold, Niobium
- Founded: 1999
- Headquarters: Vancouver, British Columbia, Canada
- Key people: Mr. Stuart McDonald, Teseko's President & CEO
- Products: Copper, Gold, Niobium, and Molybdenum
- Revenue: $218.07 million USD (2007)
- Operating income: ▲$56.98 million USD (2007)
- Net income: ▲$56.98 million USD (2007)
- Number of employees: 514 (2010)
- Website: www.tasekomines.com

Taseko Mines Limited is a mid-tier copper producer located in British Columbia, Canada. It operates Gibraltar Mine, the second largest open-pit copper mine in Canada, and is in the planning stages for several other mines including the Prosperity Mine, Harmony, and Aley. All production is sold at non-hedged market based prices. The market capitalization is currently roughly 740 million dollars.

== Company history ==
In 1991, the company acquired the Prosperity project, with subsequent acquisitions of the Gibraltar Mine from Boliden AB in 1999, and Harmony in 2002. Gibraltar was reopened in 2004, due to high copper prices. Aley was acquired in 2007.

== Proposed projects ==
=== Prosperity Mine ===
The Prosperity Mine property spans 85 square kilometres in south central British Columbia. A large copper and gold mineralization has been defined on the site, containing approximately 5.3 billion pounds of copper and 13.3 million ounces of gold. The feasibility study for the mine was completed on September 25, 2007, and the environmental review process began in July 2008.

==== Reserves ====
The operation is planned as a large open-pit copper and gold mine, with projected annual production of 108 million pounds of copper and 247,000 ounces of gold over a 20-year mine life, at an estimated cost of approximately $800 million.

In 2009, proven reserves for the mine were estimated at 481 million tonnes, grading 0.46 grams per tonne of gold and 0.26 percent copper. Probable reserves were estimated at 350 million tonnes, grading 0.35 grams per tonne of gold and 0.18 percent copper, based on a $5.50 net smelter return cut-off.

==== Timeline ====
Taseko Mines acquired the property in 1991. The feasibility study, completed on September 25, 2007, outlined a processing rate of 70,000 tonnes per day over a 20-year mine life, and the environmental assessment process began in July 2008. In November 2010, the initial open-pit proposal was rejected by the Canadian Environmental Assessment Agency review board, a decision supported by Environment Minister Jim Prentice and the minority Tory government. The following year, in November 2011, Taseko President Russell Hallbauer wrote a letter to Environment Minister Peter Kent suggesting that the proposal had been rejected for "spiritual" rather than environmental reasons. The mine was rejected a second time in 2014 by the Harper government, again on environmental grounds. In January 2017, there was an attempt to revive the project, though it lacked support from the local First Nation.

=== Harmony Mine ===
The Harmony property is located on Graham Island, the largest island of the Haida Gwaii archipelago within the Queen Charlotte Islands, off the coast of British Columbia. The property contains low-grade gold mineralization that would only be profitable to mine at historically high gold prices. As of September 2004, Taseko had yet to explore the property and valued it at a nominal $1 on its balance sheet, classifying it as an exploration asset. The latest engineering study indicated reserves of 64 million tonnes grading 1.52 grams per tonne, representing in-place resources of approximately 3 million ounces of gold. No known projects are currently pending for the site.

The property was discovered in the 1970s and acquired by Taseko in October 2001 for $2.23 million along with preferred stock. On September 30, 2004, its value was written down to a nominal $1.

=== Aley ===
The Aley asset contains niobium, a rare metal used in producing special steel alloys valued for their corrosion resistance. Currently, only two mines in the world produce this rare metal, and its spot price has risen significantly over the past five years, from as low as $6.70 per pound in 2004 to approximately $24.00 currently. The property is located near the shore of a lake, about 30 kilometres from the camp, and is classified as an exploration asset.

A feasibility study has not been completed for the site thus far, though resource estimates suggest 330 to 500 million pounds of niobium, of which around 65 percent may be recoverable. As no feasibility study has been completed, cost figures are not yet available.

The property was discovered by Cominco in the 1980s. Taseko acquired it in June 2007 for $1.5 million in cash plus approximately 894,730 common shares, and exploration of the property began in 2008.

== Financial information ==
Taseko's shares are listed on the NYSE under the ticker symbol "TGB." The company also holds 7.318 million shares of Continental Mining, a Chinese mining company.

Assets
	March 31, 2008	September 30, 2007	June 2007	September 2006
Current Assets				
Cash and equivalents	66,416	37,636	44,306	89,408
Restricted Cash	-	4,400	4,400	-
Marketable Securities and investments	14,850	18,542	-	-
Accounts Receivable	12,209	12,021	16,203	9,342
Income Taxes Receivable	6,344	-	-	-
Advances to Related party	-	807	-	-
Inventory	22,724	18,058	12,744	24,218
Prepaid expenses	839	1,069	2,641	1,221
Current portion of promissory note	723	2,086	1,238	2,157
	124,105	94,619	97,907	149,447
Restricted Cash	-	4,400	4,400	-
Reclamation Deposits	35,468	33,396	32,653	32,004
Promissory Note	73,058	72,350	72,128	71,009
Property, plant and equipment	221,821	176,898	136,843	43,445
	458,852	337,263	339,531	297,461

Liabilities
	March 31, 2008	September 30, 2007	June 2007	September 2006
Current Liabilities				
Accounts payable and accrued liabilities	27,032	30,435	20,646	21,961
Advances from related party	118	-	-	-
Current portion of deferred revenue	175	175	1,095	1,225
Current portion of royalty obligation	723	2,086	1,238	2,157
Income taxes payable	-	6,573	13,166	3,985
Current portion of future income taxes	-	807	-	-
	29,976	44,589	35,225	47,862
Income taxes	25,478	24,645	22,523	21,058
Royalty obligation	62,590	63,330	63,825	64,632
Deferred revenue	963	1,050	1,094	1,225
Convertible debt	43,383	41,008	42,173	42,775
Site closure and reclamation cost	14,334	17,441	19,864	18,975
Future income taxes	35,671	21,540	5,591	-
	212,395	213,603	190,295	196,527
