= Stikinia =

Fragment of Earth's crust in British Columbia, Canada

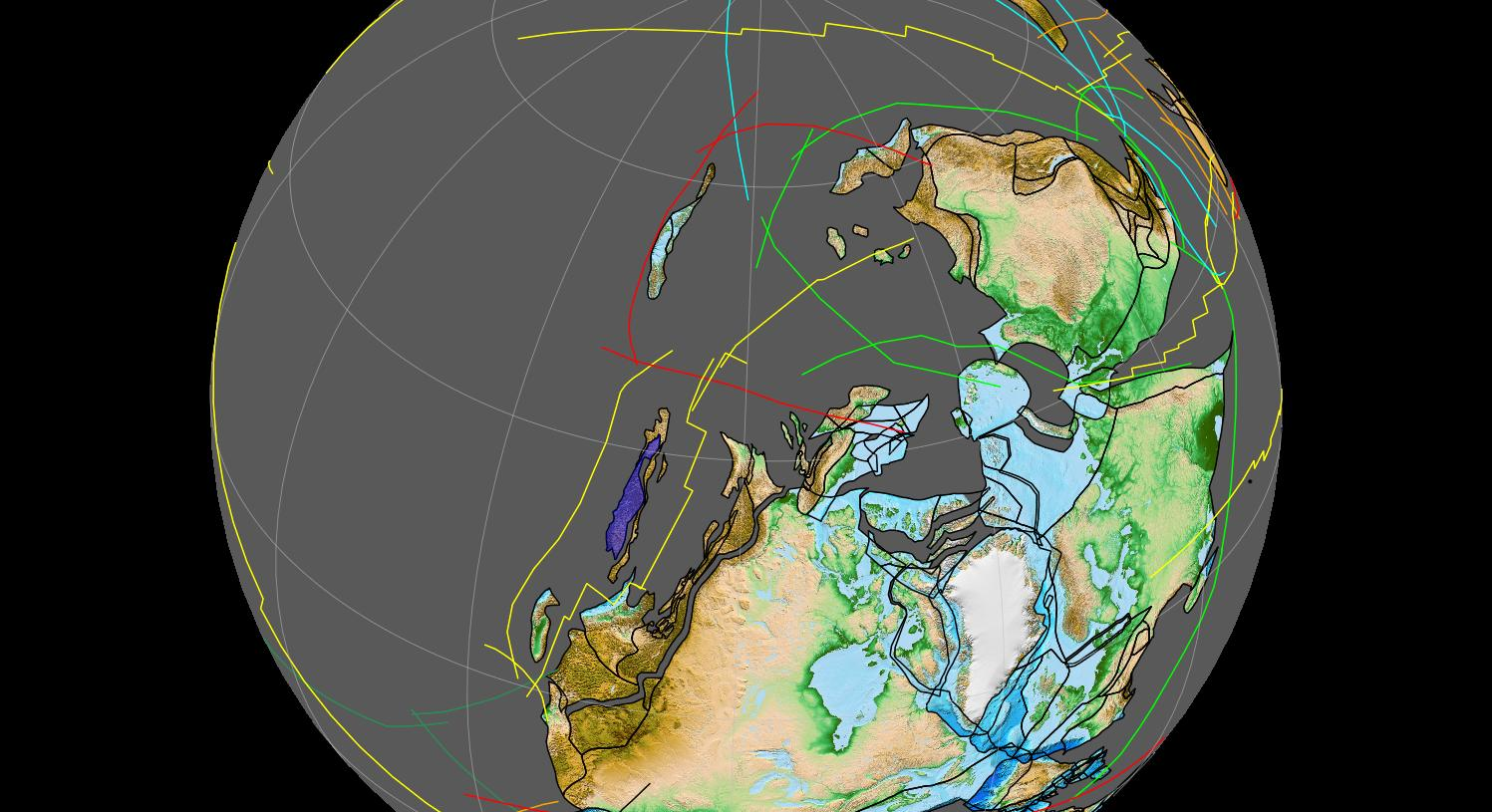
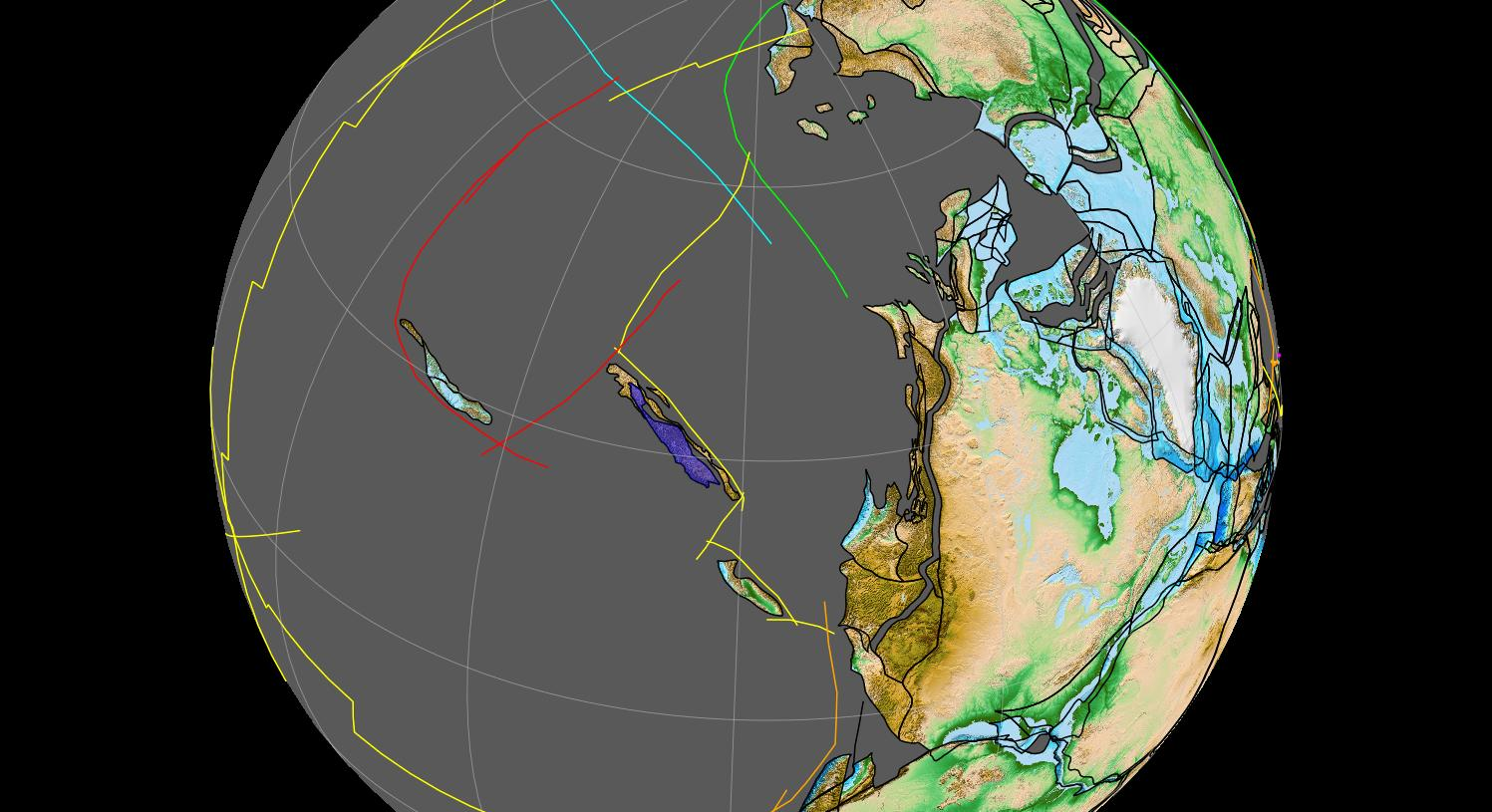
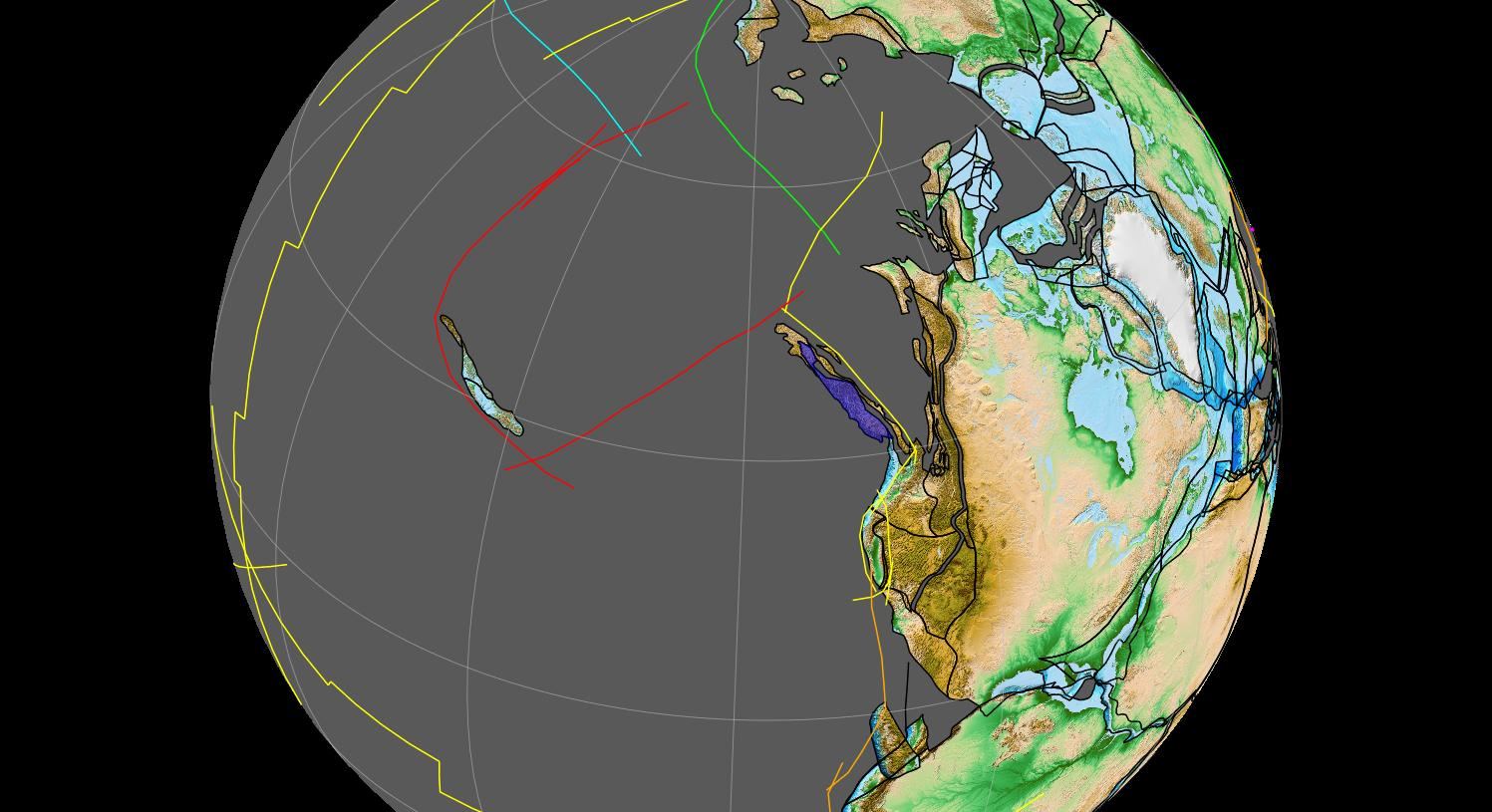
Stikinia (in blue) at 330, 269, and 251 Ma, or before the breakup of Pangaea. At 269 Ma Stikinia is accompanied by the Wrangellia and Alexander terranes (west) and the East Klamath terrane (southeast). View centred on 60th meridian west.

Stikinia, or the Stikine terrane, is a terrane in British Columbia, Canada; the largest of the Canadian Cordillera. It formed as an independent, intraoceanic volcanic arc during the Paleozoic and Mesozoic.

Stikinia forms the bedrock of numerous volcanoes in the southern portion of the Northern Cordilleran Volcanic Province (NCVP), a Miocene to Holocene geologic province that has its origins in continental rifting.

== Extent ==
Until recently the Paleozoic rocks that form a non-continuous belt along the western margin of the NCVP (the Stikine assemblage) were only recognized in a restricted area in northern British Columbia, between the Stikine River and Taku River areas. In contrast, Mesozoic Stikinia rocks form a near-continuous belt that extends much farther to the north, leading some authors to question the nature of the unexposed Paleozoic basement north of the Taku River area.

The following correlations have significant implications for tectonic reconstructions of the northern Cordillera because they suggest that Stikinia's Paleozoic volcanic-sedimentary basement is more widespread than previously thought.

== Formation ==
On the basis of similar rock types and lithologic associations, six new uranium-lead zircon dates, and the common intrusive relationship with 184–195 million year old plutons, the Stikine assemblage is correlated with the Boundary Ranges suite, a metamorphosed Paleozoic volcanic assemblage exposed in the Tagish Lake area, north of the Taku River and south of the Yukon–British Columbia border.

The recognition of the Boundary Ranges suite and the Jurassic plutons that intruded it (Tagish Lake suite) as part of Stikinia has implications for the age and character of the Stikinia–Tracy Arm terrane boundary because the Boundary Ranges and Tagish Lake suites form the footwall of a major Middle Jurassic shear zone that carried the continental margin–like rocks of the Tracy Arm terrane in its hanging wall. This correlation also implies that the late Paleozoic basement to the Mesozoic Stikinia arc is not a continental margin assemblage, at least as far north as the British Columbia–Yukon border, and possibly farther.

The Boundary Ranges suite, and therefore the Stikine assemblage, are also tentatively correlated with parts of the Yukon–Tanana terrane in Yukon (Aishihik Lake area), parts of the Taku terrane in southeast Alaska, and undivided metamorphic rocks in west-central British Columbia. Differences in the isotopic signatures of these rocks may reflect along-strike changes in the character of the basement rocks of the late Paleozoic Stikinia volcanic arc.

== See also ==
- Takla Group – group of volcanic rocks in British Columbia, Canada
- Volcanology of Canada – Volcanic activity in Canada
- Volcanology of Western Canada
