= New Afton mine =

Gold and copper mine in British Columbia, Canada

- Location in Canada
- Location: Kamloops, British Columbia; 50°39′35″N 120°30′48″W
- Products: Gold; Silver; Copper
- Production: 79 million pounds copper; 69,000 ounces gold
- Financial year: 2019
- Discovered: 1897
- Opened: 2012
- Company: New Gold
- Website: New Afton Mine

The New Afton mine is a Canadian gold and copper mine located 17 kilometres (11 mi) west of the city of Kamloops in British Columbia. The mine is underground and is owned and operated by New Gold Inc. In 2019, the mine produced an output of 79,000,000 pounds (36,000,000 kg) of copper, and 69,000 ounces of gold. The Afton Group covers 61 claims on 12,450 hectares (124.5 km^{2}) of property.

As of December 2019, the proven and probable reserves of the mine were 1.0 million ounces of gold, 2.8 million ounces of silver, and 802 million pounds of copper.

== Staff ==
About 744 (2022) Kamloops-area workers work on site. These workers used to work shifts seven days on and then get seven days off. The mine has recently moved to a fourteen-day on, fourteen-day off schedule.

== Geology ==
The New Afton mineralization is classified as an alkalic porphyry copper-gold deposit. The deposits are located in the southern part of the Quesnel trough, in the Nicola Belt.

== See also ==
- List of gold mines in Canada
- List of copper mines in Canada
- List of mines in British Columbia
- Gibraltar Mine
- Mount Polley mine
- Geology of British Columbia
