= New Gold =

Mining company

New Gold Inc.
- Type: Public
- Traded as: TSX: NGD
- Industry: Mining
- Founded: January 1980; 46 years ago
- Headquarters: Toronto, Canada
- Key people: Robert Gallagher (CEO, 2007-16); Renaud Adams (CEO, 2018-current)
- Products: Gold Silver Copper
- Revenue: $630 mil (2019)▲
- Total equity: $961 mil (2019)▲
- Subsidiaries: Minera San Xavier S.A. de C.V. (Mexico)
- Website: www.newgold.com

New Gold Inc. is a Canadian mining company that owns and operates the New Afton gold-silver-copper mine in British Columbia and the Rainy River gold-silver mine in Ontario, Canada. In March 2026, it was announced that Coeur Mining had completed the acquisition of the firm.

Headquartered in Toronto, shares of the company are traded on the Toronto Stock Exchange and NYSE American. Through a Mexican subsidiary company, they also own the Cerro San Pedro gold-silver mine in San Luis Potosí, Mexico, which ceased operation in 2017.

While New Gold was founded in 1980 for the purposes of mineral exploration, the company became a mine operator with its merger of Peak Gold and Metallica Resources in 2008. A fourth company, Western Goldfields, joined in 2009. Together they operated the Peak mine in Australia and Mesquite Mine in California but sold both in 2018.

== Operating mines ==
As of 2020, New Gold operates two mines:

- New Afton - The New Afton gold-silver-copper mine is an underground (block cave) mine located within the footprint of the Afton mine, 10 km west of Kamloops, British Columbia, Canada. That original Afton mine was an open pit mine that was operated by Teck Corporation (later Teck Cominco) between 1977 and 1997. In targeting a specific mineral deposit, New Gold constructed underground tunnels, along with a new concentrator and tailings facility. They achieved commercial production in July 2012 at which time the mine had an expected 12 year life. Between 2013 and 2019 the mine produced between 69,000 and 105,000 ounces of gold each year.
- Rainy River - The Rainy River mine is a gold-silver mine located within the Rainy River District in western Ontario, Canada. New Gold acquired mineral rights to the area in 2013 and immediately pursued its development so that it was able to achieve commercial production in late-2017. It is designed to be an open pit mine that would transition to underground tunnels over its 14 year life. It quickly became their best producing mine with 227,000 ounces of gold produced in 2018 and 253,000 ounces in 2019.

== Corporate history ==
New Gold Inc was the result of a merger in July 2008 of three companies (New Gold, Peak Gold, Metallica Resources) in various stages of developing and operating gold mines in North and South America and in Australia. Individually, the three were junior mining companies listed on the Toronto Stock Exchange with Peak Gold listed solely on the TSX Venture Exchange, and the other two interlisted on the American Stock Exchange. Combined, they formed a $1.6 billion mid-tier mining company with 3.2 million ounces of proven and probable gold reserves. Though it was the smallest of the three, New Gold became the parent company with Metallica Resources and Peak Gold becoming subsidiaries. Shareholders of Metallica Resources were given a 45.7% stake in New Gold with and Peak Gold shareholders being given 37.8% and the remaining 16.5% share going to the old New Gold shareholders. A year later, Western Goldfields Inc was added in an all-stock deal which gave Western Goldfields shareholders a 42% stake of the new company.

=== Original companies ===
The original New Gold brought with it its developing New Afton mine near Kamloops, British Columbia. The company had been founded in 1980 as DRC Resources Corporation, headquartered in Vancouver, to investigate previously explored mineral properties in Canada for their exploitation potential. One of these properties, acquired in 1999, was the Afton Mine which had produced gold and copper from 1977 to 1988. In 2005, the company sold its other assets to pursue the Afton project as it had emerged as a viable prospect for profitably developing, and they changed their name to New Gold Inc.

Peak Gold Ltd. contributed two operating gold mines to the new company: the Peak Mine in Australia and Amapari Mine in Brazil. Goldcorp had inherited those mines, along with others, when it merged with Wheaton River Minerals in 2005 and used GPJ Ventures Ltd, which was under the administration of Endeavour Financial, to spin off the two underperforming mines. Goldcorp retained a 22% interest in Peak Gold and was paid US$200 million in the April 2007 deal.

Metallica Resources entered the merger as it was beginning to operate the Cerro San Pedro mine which had just produced to date 39,000 ounces of gold of its 1,500,000 ounces of proven and probable reserves. Metallica had acquired the property in 1995 for exploration purposes but they had struggled through its development phase in resolving environmental impacts and navigating the Mexican legal system to have its permits enforced. Metallica also added its El Morro project, which was undergoing feasibility studies, in Chile to the new company.

=== Divestments and further acquisitions ===
Peak Gold's CEO Bob Gallagher was the first CEO of the new company. They immediately closed the Amapari Mine in Brazil and then sold it, in 2010, to Australian mining company Beadell Resources. Meanwhile, in May 2009, Western Goldfields Ltd merged with New Gold, making its Mesquite Mine New Golds's third operating mine. Similar to the other original companies, Western Goldfields was interlisted on the American and Toronto stock exchanges and was transitioning to become an operating gold producer. The American company, which had moved its headquarters to Toronto in 2006, had acquired the old Mesquite Mine in Imperial County, California in 2003. While mining at Mesquite had ceased in 2001, the company pursued reactivation with an improved mine plan and achieved commercial production in January 2008 and produced a total of 108,325 ounces of gold in that year. New Gold had produced 233,103 ounces of gold in 2008 from the Cerro San Pedro and Peak mines, followed by 301,773 ounces in 2009 as the Mesquite mine was added, then 382,911 ounces in 2010 and 387,155 ounces in 2011. In that same timeframe, New Gold also produced between 1.1 and 2.1 million ounces of silver each year from the Cerro San Pedro mine and between 8 and 15 million pounds of copper annually from the Peak Mine.

Throughout 2011 New Gold acquired three TSX Venture Exchange-listed mineral exploration companies: Richfield Ventures Corp., Silver Quest Resources Ltd., and Geo Minerals Ltd. All three had exploration rights in the Blackwater area, west of Quesnel, British Columbia, and New Gold would pursue it as a development project. Likewise, in 2013 New Gold took over TSX-listed Rainy River Resources Ltd., as well as Bayfield Ventures Corp. in 2014, for their rights in the Rainy River area in northwestern Ontario. Meanwhile, New Gold had successfully developed and achieved commercial production, in June 2012, at its New Afton mine. From 2012 to 2016, New Gold operated four mines. They produced 411,892 ounces of gold in 2012, then as the Cerro San Pedro mine passed its peak production and New Afton rose, 397,688 ounces in 2013; 380,135 ounces in 2014; 435,718 ounces in 2015; and 381,663 ounces in 2016. During that same timeframe, New Gold also produced between 1.3 and 1.9 million ounces of silver each year mostly from the Cerro San Pedro mine and between 42 and 102 million pounds of copper annually from the New Afton and Peak mines.

Following the retirement of Chief Executive Officer Bob Gallagher in June 2016, President Randall Oliphant also acted as CEO until Vice President Hannes Portmann took over those roles in 2017, followed by Raymond Threlkeld (who was formerly the CEO of both Western Goldfields and then of Rainy River Resources) in 2018. Finally, in September 2018, Renaud Adams was hired to be the permanent President/CEO. In those few years, they sold their 30% stake in the El Morro project in Chile to Goldcorp for $90 million plus 4% of its future gold production, the Cerro San Pedro deposit had been depleted, the Rainy River achieved commercial production, and they sold the Peak Mine project to Australian mining company Aurelia Metals Limited for $58 million. Under Adams, they completed the sale of Mesquite Mine to Equinox Gold Corp. for $158 million and the sale of a 46% interest in the New Afton mine to the Ontario Teachers' Pension Plan for $300 million cash. While the company produced 430,864 ounces in 2017, plus 1.2 million ounces of silver and 104 million pounds of copper, by 2018 they had been reduced to only two operating mines (Rainy River and New Afton) which combined to produce 315,483 ounces of gold and 85 million pounds of copper, followed by 486,141 ounces gold and 79 million pounds copper in 2019. While the company completed its environmental assessment phase of their Blackwater gold-silver project in central British Columbia, they sold the development project to TSX Venture Exchange-listed Artemis Gold for C$190-million in cash, an 8% stream on future production, and shares in Artemis Gold. In September 2020, New Gold was added to the S&P/TSX Composite Index.

=== Past mines ===
- Cerro San Pedro - Located near the village of Cerro de San Pedro in the Mexican state of San Luis Potosí, the Cerro San Pedro gold-silver project was operated by New Gold's Mexican subsidiary Minera San Xavier S.A. de C.V. The mine opened in 2007 with an expected 10 mine life. While it was a locally unpopular project due to impacts on water resources and heritage sites, New Gold continued its operations, having produced between 100,000 and 140,000 ounces of gold annually until it began winding down operations in 2016 and closing completely in 2017.
- Peak Mine - New Gold inherited from Peak Gold, the operation of the high-grade Peak gold-copper-lead mine near Cobar, New South Wales, Australia. New Gold produced 95,000 ounces of gold from the mine each year until it was sold in 2018.
- Mesquite Mine - Located in Imperial County, California near the Algodones Dunes, the Mesquite gold mine was operated by New Gold through its Western Goldfields subsidiary between 2009 and 2018 when it sold. Despite the low-grade of the mineral deposit, the mine produced between 107,000 and 170,000 ounces of gold each year.

== Carbon footprint ==
New Gold reported Total CO2e emissions (Direct + Indirect) for 31 December 2020 at 164 Kt.
