= McLeese Lake =

- Mud Lake
- Location within British Columbia
- Location: Cariboo, British Columbia, Canada
- Coordinates: 52°24′32″N 122°17′48″W
- Type: lake

McLeese Lake, originally Mud Lake, is a lake in the Cariboo region of British Columbia, Canada. It is located on the Cariboo Highway (British Columbia Highway 97) and is the namesake of the community of the same name. It was named for Robert McLeese, hotel owner and storekeeper and steamboat owner and MLA (Member of the Legislative Assembly of British Columbia).

== See also ==
- List of lakes of British Columbia
