= Quesnellia =

Terrane in British Columbia, Canada

Quesnellia, or the Quesnel terrane, a terrane in British Columbia, Canada, is a constituent of the Canadian Cordillera. It formed as a volcanic arc during the Triassic and Jurassic periods of the Mesozoic era.

The Quesnel terrane forms part of the Intermontane superterrane along with the Stikinia and Cache Creek terranes.

Quesnellia contains numerous deposits of alkalic copper‐gold porphyry.

== See also ==
- Volcanology of Canada – Volcanic activity in Canada
- Volcanology of Western Canada
