= Millertown, Newfoundland and Labrador =

Coordinates: 48.8125°N 56.5417°W

Millertown
- Town
- Interactive map of Millertown
- Country: Canada
- Province: Newfoundland and Labrador
- Settled: 1900
- Incorporated (town): 1963

Government
  - Mayor: Fiona Humber

Population (2021)
  - Total: 87
- Time zone: UTC-3:30 (NST)
  - Summer (DST): UTC-2:30 (NDT)
- Canadian Postal code: A0H 1V0
- Area code: 709

Millertown is a town in the Canadian province of Newfoundland and Labrador on the north-east side of Beothuk Lake. The town had a population of 87 in the Canada 2021 Census.

Millertown was founded in 1900 by Scottish lumber baron Lewis Miller.

== Demographics ==
In the 2021 Census of Population conducted by Statistics Canada, Millertown had a population of 87 living in 40 of its 49 total private dwellings, a change of 7.4% from its 2016 population of 81. With a land area of 3.08 km^{2} (1.19 sq mi), it had a population density of 28.2/km^{2} (73.2/sq mi) in 2021.

== Media ==
=== Radio ===
- CBTL-FM/90.1: CBC Radio One (relays CBT-FM from Grand Falls-Windsor)
