= Highland Valley Copper mine =

Open-pit copper mine in British Columbia, Canada

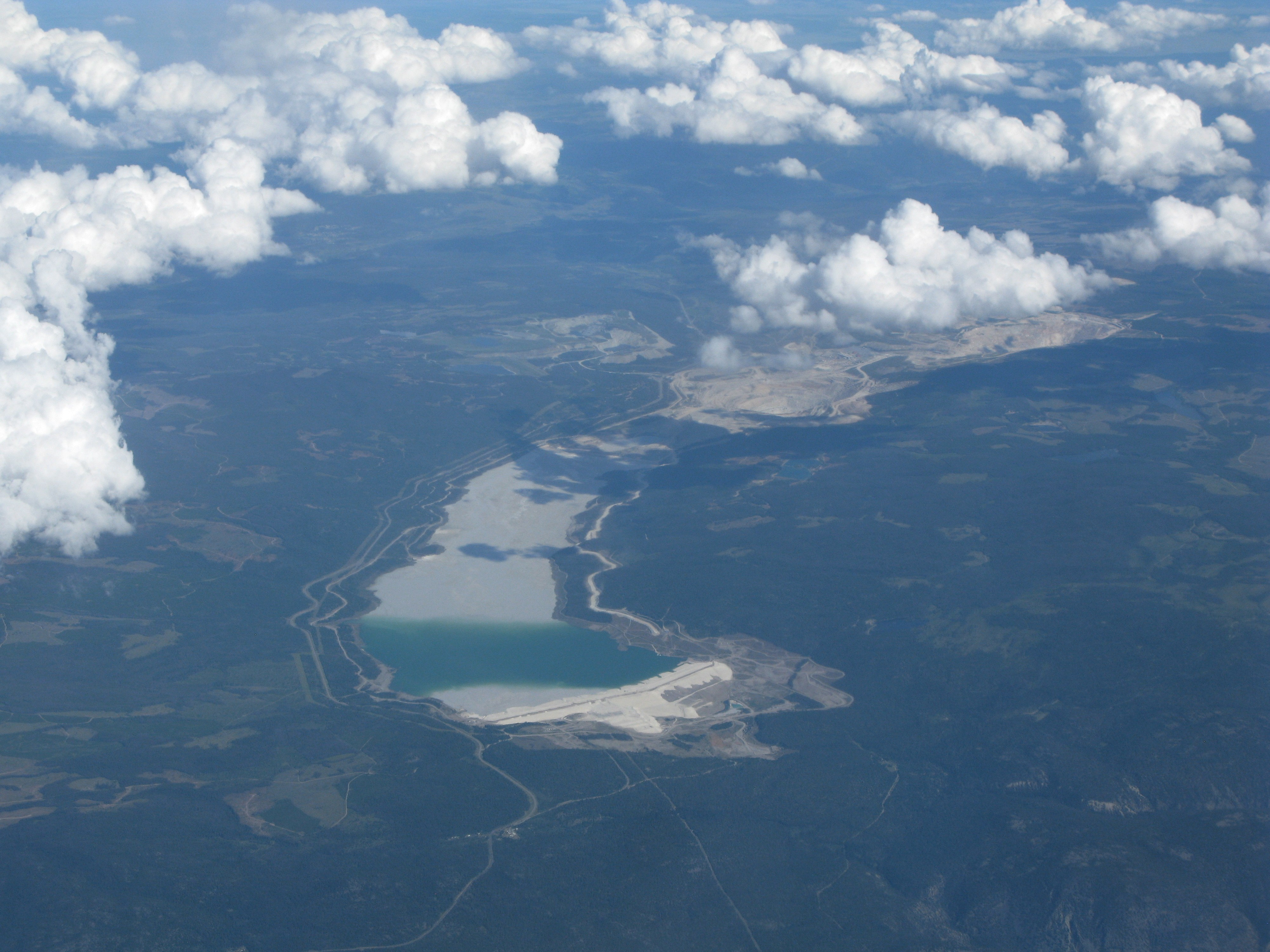
- The mine and its tailings pond from the northwest

- Location in British Columbia
- Location: Thompson Plateau, British Columbia, Canada; 50°28′25″N 121°01′18″W
- Products: Copper, Molybdenum
- Opened: 1962
- Company: Teck Resources (100%)
- Website: Highland Valley Copper

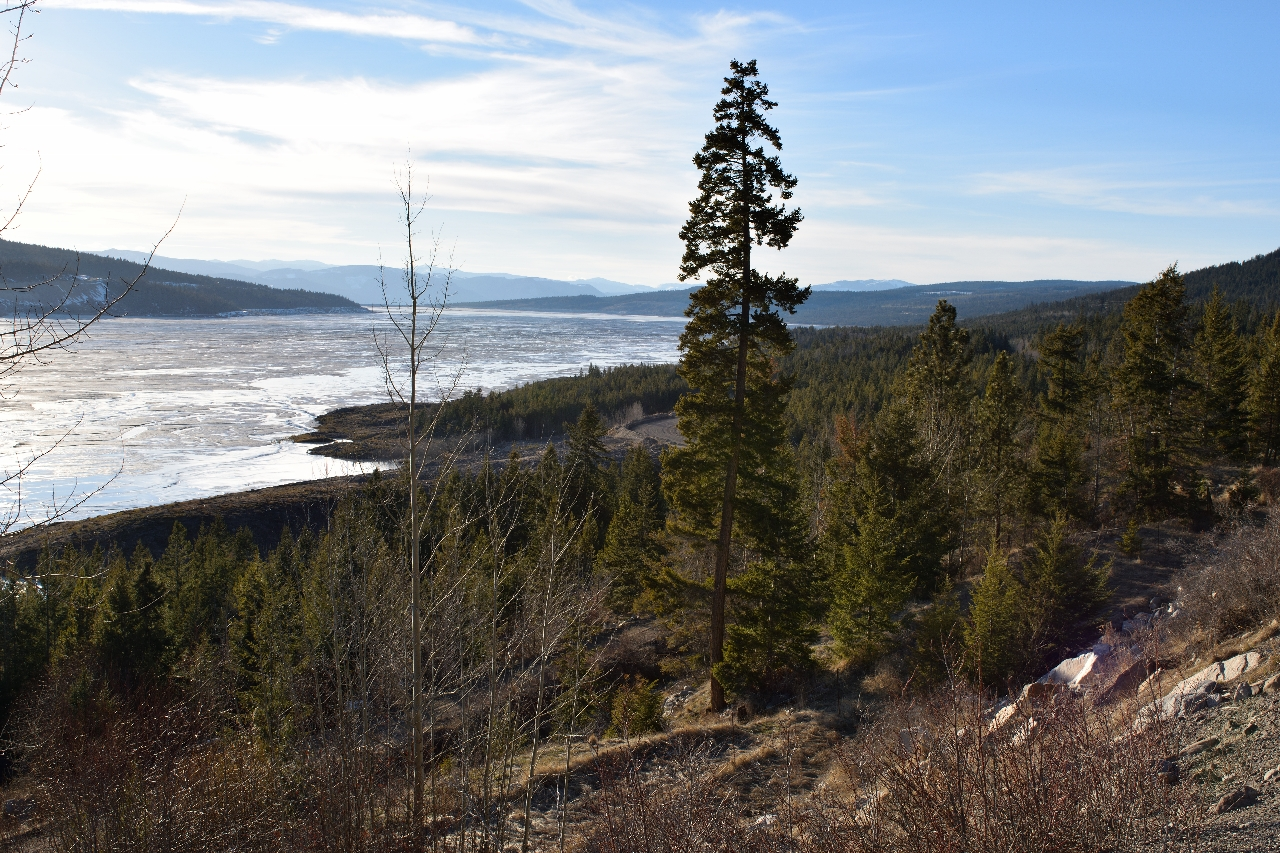
View of the tailings seen from north side looking west

The Highland Valley Copper mine is the largest open-pit copper mine in Canada, located near Logan Lake, British Columbia. It is an amalgamation of three historic mining operations: Bethlehem (later Valley Copper), Lornex and Highmont.

== History ==
=== Early years ===
The earliest roots of the Bethlehem mining operations began when the Jersey zone was staked and bonded to a French syndicate c. 1886 – c. 1887. This claim changed hands several times until finally in October 1954 when the Huestis-Reynolds-McLallen Syndicate sponsored a prospective examination covering 100 claims including Jersey and surrounding zones.

Copper was known to occur in the Cascade Mountains near Princeton as the productive mines of Allenby in 1914 had shown. On the strength of this, prospectors searched for other deposits in the region. These they found north of Merritt and east of Ashcroft at Logan Lake at the Jersey zone.

=== 1950s-1960s ===
In February 1960, Bethlehem Copper Corporation made an agreement with the Japanese group Sumitomo for US$5.5 million to bring the property into production. Construction began in July 1961. At the time, Jersey and East Jersey were identified as zones containing suitable ore for production, and an assessment was completed of the area between the two zones. It was found that this middle area did not have suitable deposits to favour commercial operation and the Jersey and East Jersey zones were mined separately. This operation of two mines in close proximity by the same company led to a case brought before the Supreme Court of Canada on what constituted a mine for tax purposes.

Production of the East Jersey pit began on November 28, 1962, and continued until February 17, 1965, when a rock slide forced the Company to end the pit's life early. Production of the Jersey pit began quickly after.

=== 1970s and 1980s ===
The Jersey pit was given an extension in 1977, extending its life another 5 years. Two minor additional pits were also operated for brief periods during this time: Huestis from 1970 to 1976 and Iona from 1976 to 1979.

On the south side of the valley the Lornex mine began mining in 1972.

In 1981 Cominco, who already owned the claim to the Valley Copper deposit located west of Bethlehem, purchased Bethlehem Copper to consolidate the nearby operations. Mining of the original Bethlehem Copper pits ceased in 1982. The Bethlehem concentrator continued to operate on ore from the Valley Copper deposit until June 1989.

Production on the Valley Copper mine, now the largest mine and most noticeable feature, began in January 1983. For fifty years the ore was dug using shovels and open pit methods. A very large pit ensued--half a mile deep and two miles in diameter.

Highland Valley Copper was created in mid-1986 when the Highland Valley mining operations of Lornex Mining Corporation Ltd. and Cominco Ltd. were combined into a new single entity, structured as a partnership.

The Highmont mill on the south side of the valley was acquired in 1988 when Highmont Mining Company joined the partnership. This mill had been closed down in 1984 when the Highmont deposit became uneconomical.

== Current operation ==
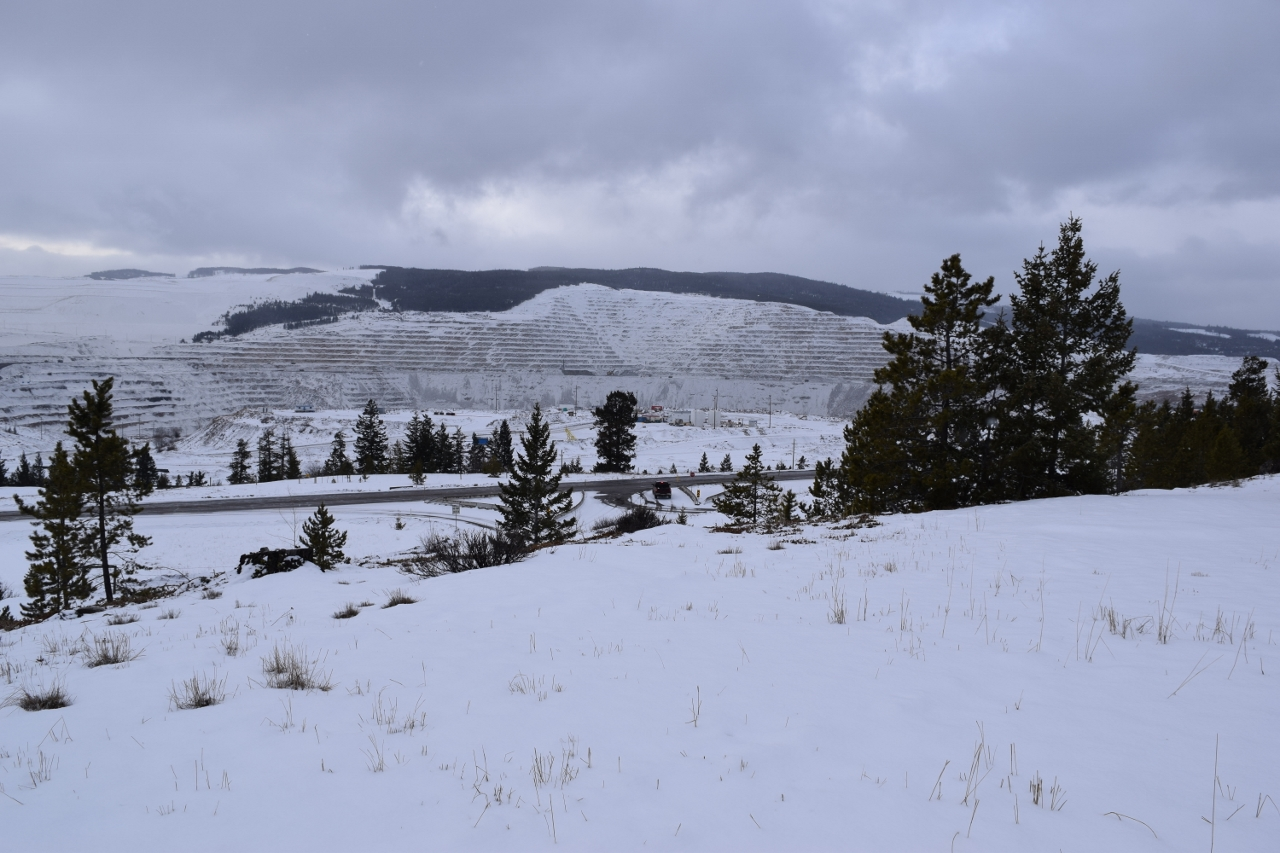
View of the mine, which contains multiple pits

A large tailing pond is maintained to support these operations (48.5 million tonnes of tailings pumped in 2003), with two containment embankments to retain the tailings from the environment. In April 2017 freezing pipes caused 850 cubic meters of process water to spill. The spill was contained on site and returned to the tailing pond. Trojan Pond, a previous tailing pool used in the operation, began to be reclaimed in 1990 and is now a self-sustaining ecosystem and used for sport fishing.

Copper and molybdenum mineral concentrates, which include trace amounts of silver and gold, are sent via truck to nearby rail facilities in Ashcroft where the ore is carried to the Port of Vancouver and to international destinations (primarily Japan and China for copper and steel production). The mine employed approximately 1300 persons in 2011.

== See also ==
- List of copper mines in Canada
- Mount Polley mine
- Gibraltar Mine
