= Horsefly (disambiguation) =

Horsefly or horse-fly is a family of true flies in the insect order Diptera.

Horsefly may also refer to:

- Horsefly Lake Provincial Park
- Horsefly, British Columbia
- Horsefly River

== See also ==
- Horsefly weed
- The Horse Flies - Ithaca, New York, alternative rock/folk band
