= Horsefly Lake =

- Location within British Columbia
- Location: Cariboo
- Coordinates: 52°23′00″N 121°10′00″W
- Type: lake
- Surface area: 14,500 acres (59 km^{2})
- Average depth: 217 feet (66 m)
- Max. depth: 632 feet (193 m)

Horsefly Lake is a lake in the eastern Cariboo region of the Central Interior of British Columbia, Canada. With a maximum depth of 632 feet (193 m), it is one of the Cariboo's deepest lakes. It lies at the head of the little Horsefly River, a tributary of the Horsefly River, and is one of several large lakes at the verge of the Cariboo Plateau (W) and the Cariboo Mountains (E); Quesnel Lake, the largest of those, is to its north and northwest. The lake's name first appeared on maps with Joseph Trutch's 1871 publication, and is credited with being so named because of the preponderance of horseflies in the area during summer.

Horsefly Lake Provincial Park is located on its northwestern shore.

== See also ==
- List of lakes of British Columbia
- Horsefly, British Columbia
