= Mount Polley =

Mountain in British Columbia, Canada

- Location within British Columbia
- Interactive map of Mount Polley

Highest point
- Elevation: 1,255 m (4,117 ft)
- Prominence: 271 m (889 ft)
- Coordinates: 52°33′24″N 121°38′09″W

Geography
- Location: British Columbia, Canada
- District: Cariboo Land District
- Topo map: NTS 93A12 Likely

Mount Polley, originally Polley Mountain, elevation 1255 m (4117 feet), prominence 271 m, is a low mountain in the Cariboo region of the Central Interior of British Columbia, Canada. It is located just west of the foot of Quesnel Lake between Bootjack and Polley Lakes. The site experienced a dam breach in 2014 at the Mount Polley mine which caused a spill of mine tailings into the nearby lake and creek.

== Name origin ==
The name refers to a prospector who held placer leases in the area, a W. Polley. It is presumed that he is a "Mr. Polley" identified in the 1887 edition of the BC Mines Report, who prospected in the Kangaroo Creek-Quesnel Forks area.
