= Little Canyon =

Little Canyon may refer to:

== Geography ==
- Little Canyon Rim, Arizona
- Little Canyon Loop Trail, Arizona
- There are a number of Little Canyons in British Columbia, Canada
  - Little Canyon (Skeena), a stretch of the Skeena River near Terrace
  - Little Canyon (Zymoetz), a stretch of the Zymoetz River, a tributary of the Skeena
  - Little Canyon (Quesnel)
  - the name Little Canyon was historically applied to the Fraser Canyon between Spuzzum and Yale

== Other ==
- Little Canyon Cave, Wyoming
- Little Canyon Winery, New Mexico
