= Cariboo Mountains Provincial Park =

Provincial park in British Columbia, Canada

- IUCN category Ib (wilderness area)

- Location within British Columbia
- Interactive map of Cariboo Mountains Provincial Park
- Location: Cariboo RD, British Columbia, Canada
- Nearest city: Quesnel
- Coordinates: 52°52′59″N 120°31′00″W
- Area: 113,469 ha (438.11 sq mi)
- Established: July 12, 1995
- Governing body: BC Parks

Cariboo Mountains Provincial Park is a provincial park in British Columbia, Canada, located northeast of Likely. Comprising 113,469 ha., the park is located in the Cariboo Mountains between Bowron Lakes Provincial Park (NW) and Wells Gray Provincial Park (SE).

The park was established as Mitchell Lake/Niagara Park in 1995. Its name as changed to Cariboo Mountains Park in 2000.
