= Dudley Little =

Dudley Little may refer to:

- Big Tiny Little (1930–2010), American musician
- Dudley George Little (1914–1972), business owner and politician in British Columbia, Canada
