= Cedar Point Provincial Park =

Park in Canada

- IUCN category II (national park)
- Location within British Columbia
- Interactive map of Cedar Point Provincial Park
- Location: Cariboo RD, British Columbia, Canada
- Nearest city: Williams Lake
- Coordinates: 52°34′38″N 121°32′18″W
- Area: 8 ha (20 acres)
- Designation: Class C Provincial Park
- Established: 23 January 1962
- Governing body: BC Parks

Cedar Point Provincial Park is a Class C provincial park located on the western end of Quesnel Lake in the Cariboo Region of British Columbia, Canada. As a Class "C" park, it is managed locally by a park board based in the nearby town of Likely. The park was established in 1962 and is approximately 8 hectares in area.

The park features the lake itself and an outdoor museum detailing the history of mining in the area.
