= Bowron Lake Provincial Park =

Wilderness park in British Columbia, Canada

- IUCN category II (national park)
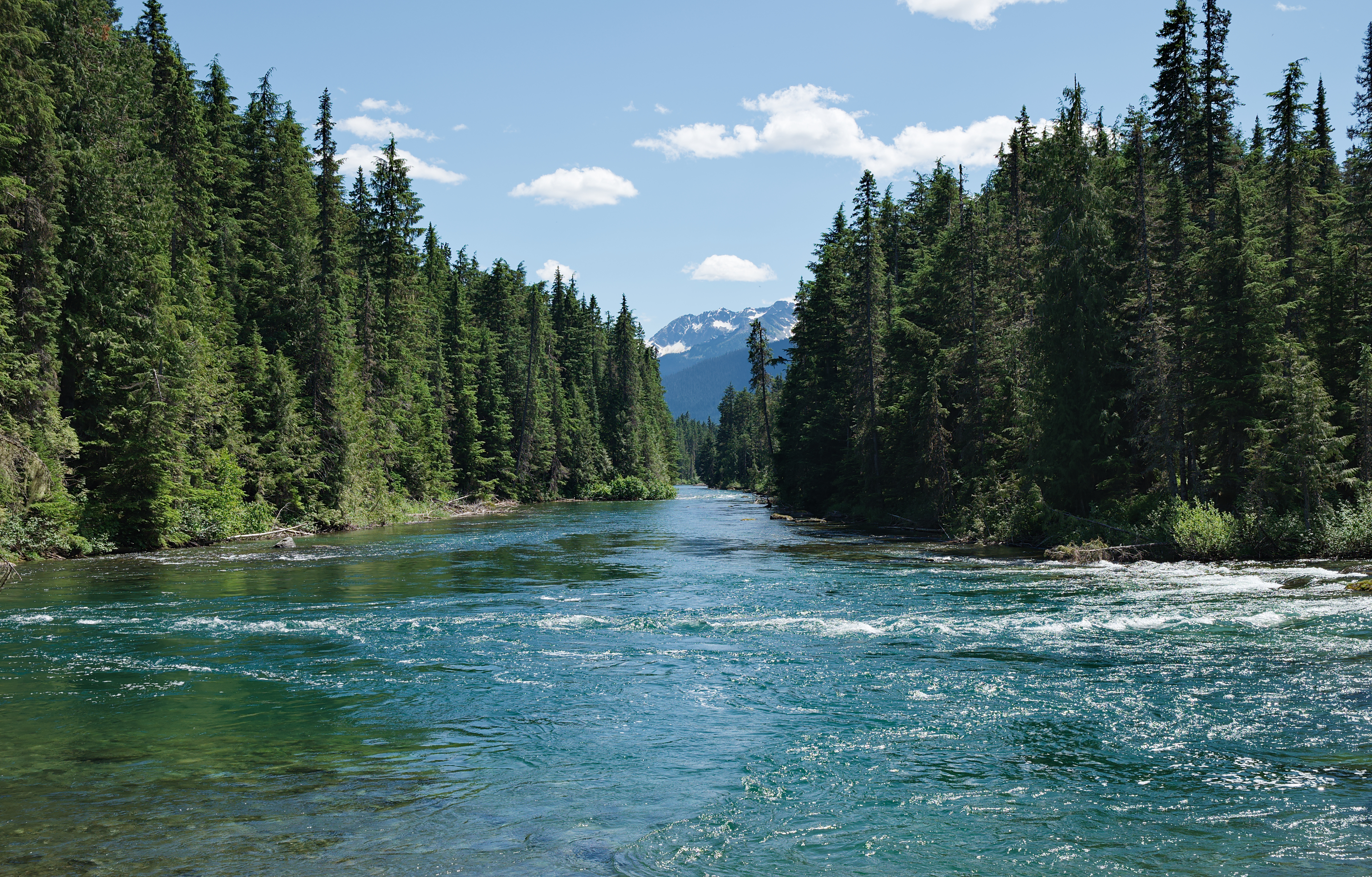
- Isaac River, Bowron Lake Provincial Park

- Location within British Columbia
- Interactive map of Bowron Lake Provincial Park
- Nearest city: Quesnel
- Coordinates: 53°10′59″N 121°02′00″W
- Area: 368,700 acres (1,492 km^{2})
- Established: 1961
- Visitors: 5,000 (in 2006)
- Governing body: BC Parks
- Website: bcparks.ca/bowron-lake-park/

Bowron Lake Provincial Park is a wilderness provincial park located in east-central British Columbia, Canada, near the border with Alberta. It is 117 km (73 mi) east of the city of Quesnel. Other nearby towns include Wells and the historic destination of Barkerville. Once a popular hunting and fishing destination, today the park is protected and known for its abundant wildlife, rugged glaciated mountains, and freshwater lakes.

The park's standout attraction is the 116 km (72 mi) recreational paddling circuit through the Cariboo Mountains, which connects a majority of the park's lakes via waterways and short portages, and has been named by Outside magazine as one of the top ten canoe trips in the world. The park is open to a limited number of canoes and kayaks each year from May 15 to September 29.

== History ==
=== Indigenous use ===
Many First Nations frequented the area that is now Bowron Lake Provincial Park before European settlement. Early settlers reported encounters with natives, who were seen hunting, trapping, fishing, and foraging in the area. Accounts vary in terms of which specific groups these natives belonged to: some settlers speculated these were the Carrier people, while others suggested they were Shuswap. A 100-person village existed on Bear Lake (now known as Bowron Lake), but the village site sloughed into the lake in 1964, due to naturally occurring mudslides and possibly from seismic shock resulting from the 1964 Anchorage earthquake. By that time the village was uninhabited. It is likely that its prior inhabitants had been wiped out by disease, as the First Nations of the area were deeply impacted by the smallpox epidemics of the 1860s. The loss of the site prevented any form of carbon-dating to determine its true age.

While very little formal archaeological work has been done, a large number of indigenous artifacts have been seen in the park, including clam middens, old campfires, arrowheads, and cache pits.

As a lingering reminder of the First Nation presence in the area, many of the landmarks and features in and around the park have indigenous names, particularly in the Carrier language. Some examples are Mount Ishpa (Carrier for "my father"), Kaza ("arrow") Mountain, the Itzul ("forest") Range, the Tediko ("girls") Range, and Lanezi ("long") Lake.

=== Gold rush era ===
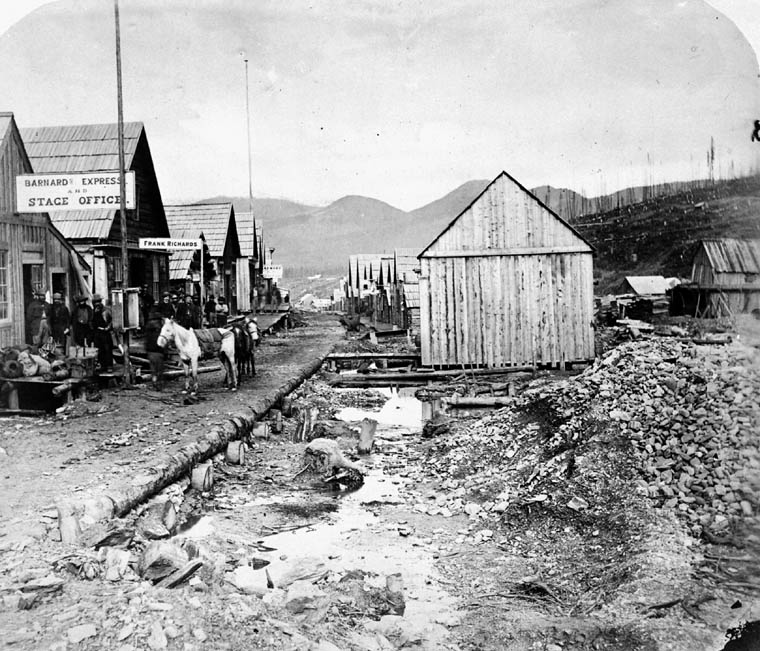
The town of Barkerville was the base of operations for prospectors exploring the Bowron Lake chain during the Cariboo Gold Rush era.

The first major arrival of European settlers in the area around Bowron Lake Park came with the Cariboo Gold Rush in the 1860s, which was centered in the nearby town of Barkerville. While little gold mining happened within the modern boundaries of the park, miners and prospectors were the first Europeans to regularly visit Bowron Lake (then called Bear Lake) and the surrounding area.

The Bowron and Cariboo mountains were continuously explored through the mid-to-late-1800s. While the Canadian Pacific Survey searched for links through the mountain passes, John Bowron, the Gold Commissioner, sent exploration parties into the hills to establish mining routes into the gold-bearing ground. One of these routes followed the Goat River pass, connecting the Cariboo region to the Tête Jaune Cache in the Robson Valley, and was well-established enough to allow for dog sleds in the winter. This trail was eventually made obsolete when the Grand Trunk Pacific Railway was finalized in 1914.

On 31 March 1917, Bowron Lake was adopted as the official name of the lake previously known as Bear Lake, to honour John Bowron – though some maps had started using this name as early as 1914, eight years after his death. John Bowron was involved with the mining industry in Barkerville throughout his life. The park later took his name the same name as the lake.

=== Settlement and establishment ===
While the bulk of the initial non-native population arrived with the gold rush, the area enjoyed a modest but steady influx of settlers throughout the late 19th to early 20th centuries, even as the gold rush ended. Land grants were given to soldiers returning from the First World War, and many families arrived to start farms.

With the end of the gold rush, trapping and hunting came to the forefront of the region's economy. While fish and game had fed miners for years, as the turn of the century arrived, the focus shifted from hunting for sustenance to sport hunting. Wilderness guides arrived in the area and attracted an ever-increasing influx of big game hunters looking to take advantage of what was called a "hunter's paradise" in the quadrangle of lakes that now make up the park. The most prominent of these guides, Frank Kibbee, started setting up trap lines in the area in 1900 and built a home on the shores of Bowron Lake in 1907. He was the longest-operating and most renowned guide in the region, and one of the lakes in the chain – Kibbee Lake – is today named after him.

In the 1920s, as concerns were raised about stress on the wildlife population in the Cariboo Mountains, the idea was proposed to turn the area within the Bowron lake quadrangle into a game reserve, citing the success of Yellowstone in the United States. The proposed reserve would be a hunting-free sanctuary where animals could breed without human interference, allowing the population to stabilize. This was widely supported by naturalists such as Thomas and Elinor McCabe, who had arrived in 1922 and built a home on Indian Point Lake, and Allan Brooks, as well as wilderness guides like the aforementioned Frank Kibbee and Joe Wendle. Despite some initial resistance from residents of Barkerville, the case was made that the establishment of the reserve would have lasting economic benefits, through the management of the game to sustain the hunting industry. The Bowron Lakes Game Reserve was established by the provincial government in 1925 and Frank Kibbee was named the reserve's first game warden shortly afterward. The reserve was originally 620 km^{2} (240 sq mi) in size, although many additions have been made to the reserve (and later, park) in the years since.

In the 1950s and 1960s, the cultural focus of British Columbia's protected areas shifted from game management to conservation. As a result, in 1961 the Bowron Lakes Game Reserve was changed to Bowron Lake Provincial Park, and the park received its largest land increases with the addition of the Betty Wendle and Wolverine drainage systems and parts of the upper Cariboo River. The enthusiasm for the Bowron Region to be purely a wilderness area was so strong that most signs of human habitation were destroyed shortly after the provincial park was declared, including rail portages, trappers' cabins, and many other signs of human development. Even the home of Thomas and Elinor McCabe, at Indian Point Lake, was burned down, in what was described by author and guide Richard Thomas Wright as "a moment of pyromaniac enthusiasm to return the land to the wilderness".

== Geography and geology ==
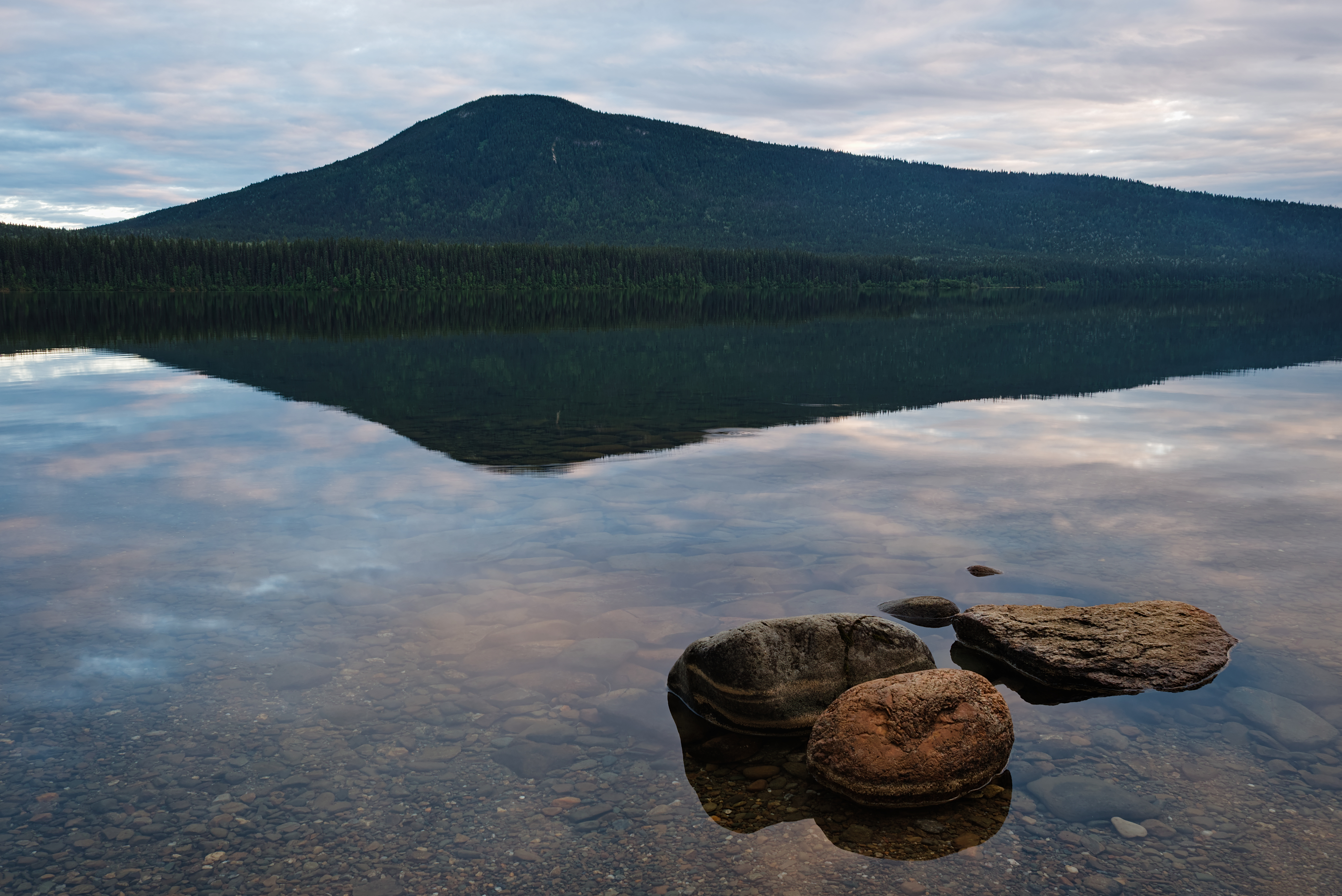
Broad rounded mountains are characteristic of the Quesnel Highlands, which make up the northwest portion of the park.

Bowron Lake Provincial park is located in the Cariboo Mountains, in central British Columbia. It is roughly 120 km (75 mi) east of the city of Quesnel, and just under 30 km (18 mi) east of the town of Wells. The park is composed of 149,207 hectares (368,699 acres) of protected wilderness, featuring many lakes and rivers nestled in mountains. This protected area is further expanded to the south, as the park shares a border with Cariboo Mountains Provincial Park, which itself shares a border with Wells Gray Provincial Park. Together, the three parks protect over 1,007,000 hectares (2,490,000 acres) of wilderness.

Bowron Lake Park contains three main groups of rock. The oldest is known as the Kaza Group, which is made up of mud and sand deposits that formed during the Precambrian period 600 million years ago, in a sea at the continental margin of what is now the Canadian Shield. The second group of rock, known today as the Cariboo Group, was formed 440 to 600 million years ago in the Cambrian period, when materials from the continental landmass were eroded by changing conditions in the sea. The third and youngest group, formed about 250 million years ago, is made up of sedimentary volcanic rocks, parts of which today are exposed in various parts of the park. This third group is known as the Slide Mountain Group.

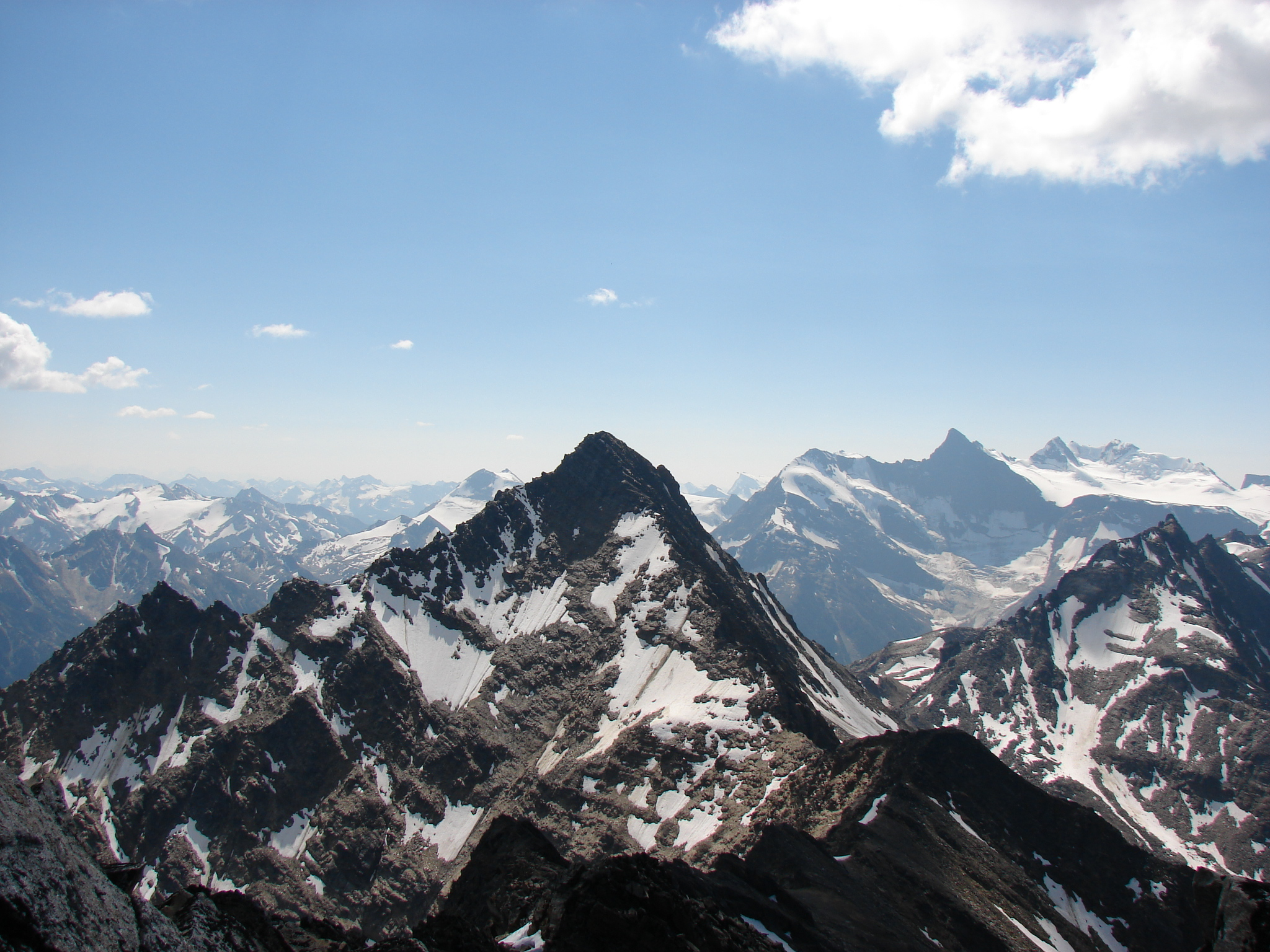
The Cariboo Mountains, in the southeast of the park, is made up of rugged, pointed peaks.

Most of the visible geological features of the park were formed during mountain-building processes that started about 100 million years after the sedimentary and volcanic material was deposited. This process formed the Quesnel highlands, to the northwest of the park, and the more rugged Cariboo Mountains to the southeast of the park. Both mountain groups were largely shaped in the Cretaceous period, alongside most of British Columbia's modern drainage channels. This continued into the Eocene, until roughly 25,000 years ago when the area was covered in a 2,000-metre ice sheet. The sheet was largely static at its center over the Cariboo Mountains, resulting in the sharp features and rugged peaks that characterize the Cariboo Range. The ice covering the Quesnel Highlands, however, was much more mobile, grinding the rock down and forming broad and rounded mountains with summits between 1,600 and 2,100 metres (5,200 and 6,900 ft) – more subdued than the summits of the Cariboo Mountains, most of which are over 2,100 meters.

12,000 years ago, the glaciers in the area retreated, forming the park as it exists today. Glacial till remains visible in many areas of the park, and some small glaciers still exist on its higher slopes. The retreat of the glaciers formed the park's main sequence of lakes in a roughly quadrilateral arrangement, as viewed from space. Some examples include Indianpoint lake, formed when water from the Cariboo river was diverted by a blockage into the Indianpoint Valley, Unna Lake, which was formed from a melting kettle, and Sandy Lake and Spectacle lake, which were formed partially by meltwater streams.

== Ecology ==
=== Flora ===
The park spans sub-alpine and alpine ecosystems, and therefore contains the characteristic plants of those zones. The predominant trees are spruce and fir (both subalpine and Douglas), cedar, and hemlock also present in various areas. For the most part, the park consists of old-growth forests, with the exception of a few areas that were burned by wildfires in the recent past.

Below the tree canopy, the park is home to numerous shrubs and berry plants, which include but are not limited to twinberry, false box, bearberry, Labrador tea, cranberry, huckleberry, mountain ash, red-osier dogwood, soopolallie, white rhododendron, and sticky currant, among others. The park is also host to a very wide array of flowers.

=== Fauna ===
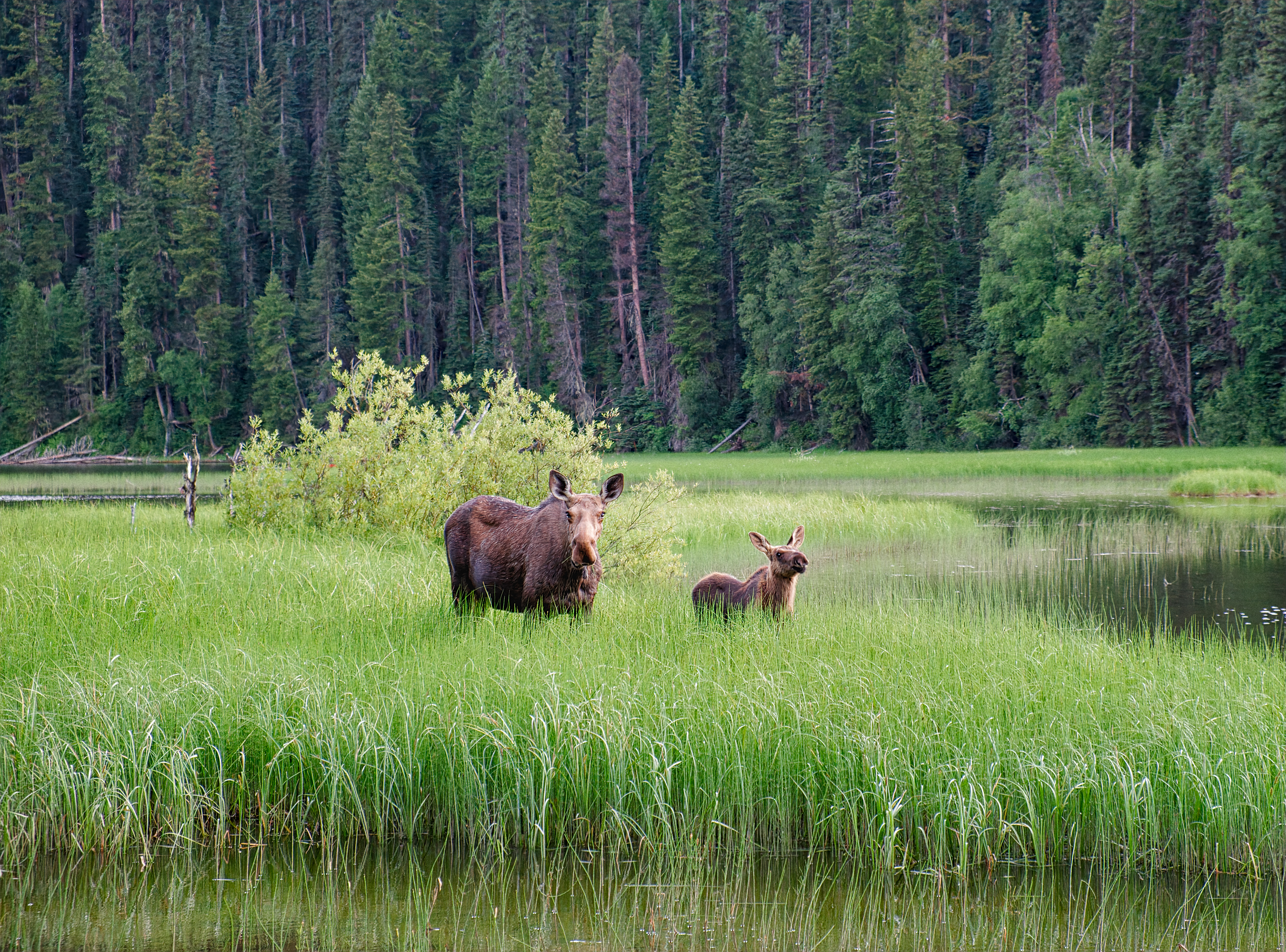
Moose are very common throughout the park, often seen feeding at the water's edge.

Having started as a game reserve, the park is frequented by a diverse selection of animals. Moose are very common in the aquatic environments around the lakes, and mule deer are often seen in the area around Unna Lake in particular. Other large mammals such as mountain goats and caribou inhabit the park's alpine regions. The park's population of smaller mammals include semiaquatic mammals like beaver, muskrat, and river otter, as well as members of the weasel family including mink, fisher, marten, stoat, least weasel, and long-tailed weasel. Small land-dwelling mammals in the park include various voles and mice, foxes, hares, coyotes, porcupines, skunks, and squirrels.

Bears are quite common in the park – black bears are numerous in the lower altitudes around the lake, and grizzly bears frequent the alpine areas. In addition to its bears, Bowron Lake Park is home to predators like cougars, wolves, wolverines, and lynx.

Due to its size, the park covers several habitats and therefore contains an immense variety of birds. Notable examples include Canada jays and ravens, which have adapted to human presence and often approach campsites in search of food, and waterfowl such as the loon, whose calls are commonly heard throughout the park. Swans winter on Sandy Lake, and both Canada geese and snow geese stop in the park during their migrations. Various predatory birds, such as osprey, can often be seen fishing in the lake's waters.

Many species of fish swim in the lakes themselves. Rainbow trout, dolly varden, kokanee, and rocky mountain whitefish inhabit most of the lakes year-round. Sockeye and chinook migrate through the Bowron Lake and River during their spawning runs. Sockeye typically arrive to spawn in the upper Bowron River around August, peaking during the start of September, while chinook spawn outside the park's grounds, in the lower Bowron River.

== Conservation ==
=== Fire ===
As in many BC parks, forest fires in Bowron Lake Park are treated as a natural process of forest rejuvenation. As such, natural fires that start in the park are generally allowed to burn, provided that they do not pose a risk to the safety of the park's users and facilities. The climate of the park can vary significantly throughout its various biogeoclimatic zones, and some areas can be significantly warmer and drier than others (for example, the Northwest portions of the park). Since they are more difficult to control, fires that start in those areas are typically not allowed to burn.

=== Beetle infestations ===
The central plateau of British Columbia, where Bowron Lake Park resides, has historically been victim to infestations of mountain pine beetle, which can kill large areas of tree forest if not controlled. Steps are being taken to control the spread of the beetle in Bowron Lake Park, using strategies such as the burning of affected trees, using trap trees (which are later felled and burned) to attract beetles, pheromone baiting (attractant pheromones for trap trees, or anti-aggregation pheromones for healthy trees), and biocontrol sprays. These control strategies are only used in zones of the park where beetle impact is expected to be severe; otherwise, the natural processes involving the beetles are allowed to continue unimpeded.

=== Wildlife and fisheries ===
Bowron Lake Park, in conjunction with Wells Gray, Cariboo Mountain, and Cariboo River parks, forms a large contiguous protected area, which acts as a haven for a wide variety of animals and wildlife. This is particularly beneficial for creatures that require large areas of undisturbed habitats, such as the grizzly bear.

The park's undeveloped wilderness provides a habitat and food source for animals such as mountain caribou, which feed off arboreal lichens that grow in the park's old-growth forests. While Caribou are migratory animals, several herds pass through the park regularly. The park is also home to an estimated three packs of wolves, who tend to feed off the park's numerous and stable population of moose. Populations of these and several other species are monitored to ensure stable populations and to maintain a healthy biodiversity in the park.

The high number of watersheds in the park make it a suitable environment for fish, and many species are widely distributed throughout its waterways. The park acts as a spawning ground for several species of trout, salmon, and others. Special regulations and limitations are applied to fishing within the park to maintain a healthy population of fish.

== Recreation ==
=== Paddling ===
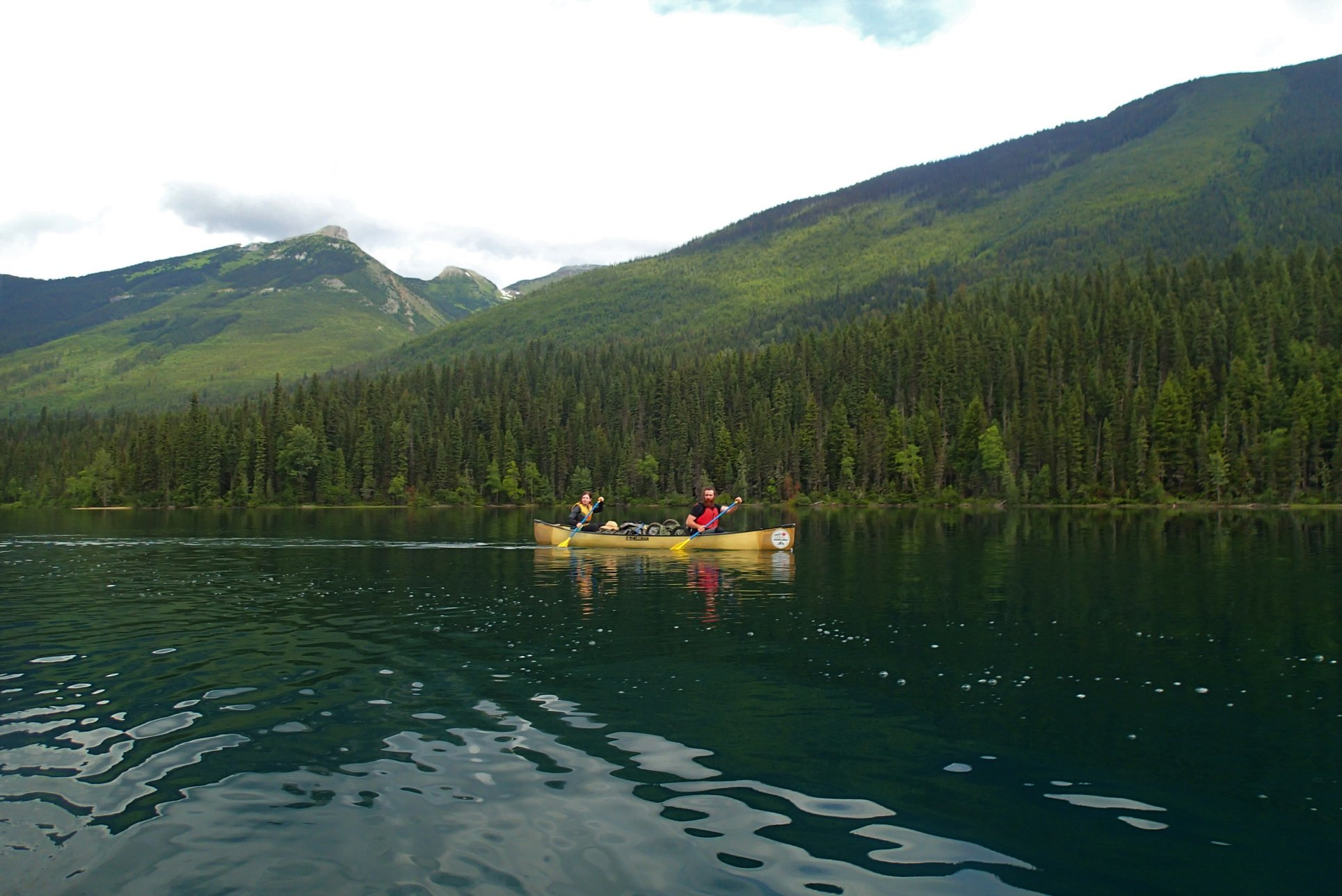
Paddling is by far the most popular recreational activity in Bowron Lake Provincial Park.

The most popular recreational activity in the park is paddling in a canoe or kayak, due to the world-renowned paddling circuit formed by its uniquely linked chain of lakes. The Bowron Lake canoe circuit has been highly rated by Outside magazine, Popular Science, Field & Stream, and others.

The circuit spans a total of 116 km and connects almost all of the park's lakes via waterways or short portages on man-made trails. In addition to views of the surrounding mountains and lakes, the circuit provides excellent wildlife viewing opportunities: moose, deer, bear, coyote, fox, beaver, songbirds, waterfowl, and small mammals are all commonly seen by paddlers.

Typical paddling time for the full circuit ranges from 6 to 10 days. Alternatively, the west side of the circuit, between Bowron Lake and Unna Lake, can be paddled on its own in 2 to 4 days. The full circuit can only be paddled in one direction, starting with a portage to Kibee Lake, and ending at the northeast shore of Bowron Lake. Paddlers camp at designated campsites along the circuit, typically in tents - some campsites have cabins, but they are intended for drying wet gear or for sleeping in emergencies.

Regulations are in place to limit party size, as well as the number of daily entries into the circuit. Since human visitation has a significant impact on the park, several other rules and restrictions have been established, all of which contribute to conservation efforts and/or help maintain the isolated wilderness experience in the circuit. These include:

- Bear-proof caches (available at each campsite) must be used for storing anything that may attract a bear.
- Cans, bottles, glass jars, and all other commercially packaged beverage and glass containers are prohibited on the circuit.
- Any music players with external speakers are prohibited on the circuit.
- No dogs or pets may enter the circuit.
- Powered watercraft are not allowed on the circuit, except at Bowron Lake.

Additionally, anyone entering the circuit must take part in a mandatory orientation session to familiarize themselves with the rules and to prepare themselves for the circuit's challenges.

=== Hiking ===
While hiking in Bowron Lake Park is much less prominent than paddling, there are three dedicated hiking trails in the park:

- Harold falls (0.5 km)
- Cariboo Falls (3 km)
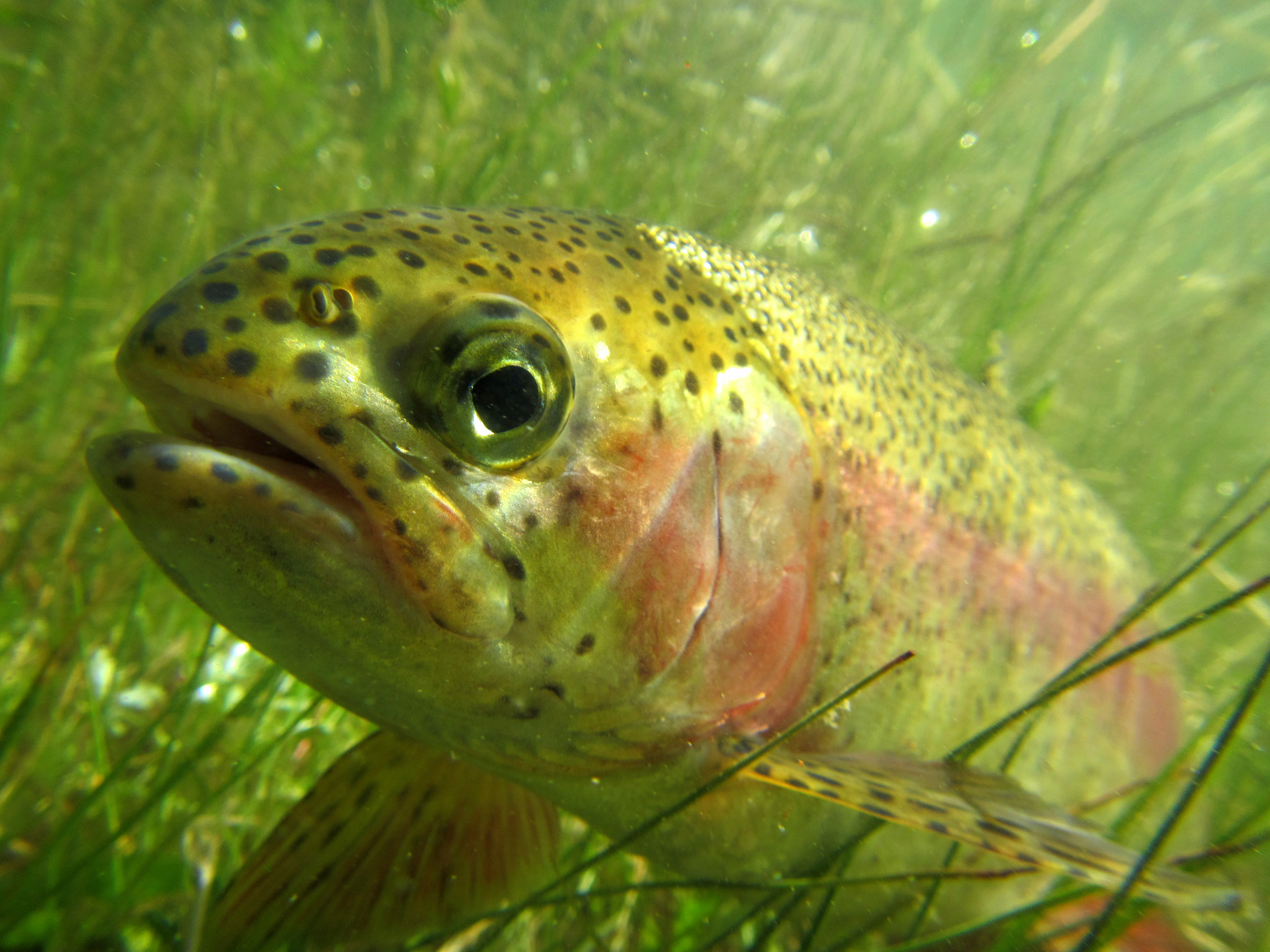
  Rainbow Trout are one of the lake fish commonly caught in Bowron Lake Provincial Park.
- Hunter Lake (2 km)

There are also several portage trails connecting various lakes and waterways, but they are primarily intended for transporting canoes and kayaks.

=== Fishing ===
Fishing is allowed in the park as long as it is done by BC fishing regulations. Bull trout, kokanee, rainbow trout, and lake trout can be caught at various points in the lakes, with the best fishing occurring in the months of June and September.

=== Winter use ===
The lakes can be crossed when frozen during the winter months. There are no set tracks, but the portage trails can be used to complete the whole circuit in skis or snowshoes.

== Lakes and rivers ==
- Kibbee Lake
- Indianpoint Lake
- Isaac Lake
- Lanezi Lake
- Sandy Lake
- Spectacle Lake
- Babcock Lake
- Swan Lake
- Bowron Lake
- Unna Lake
- Cariboo River
- Bowron River

== Gallery ==
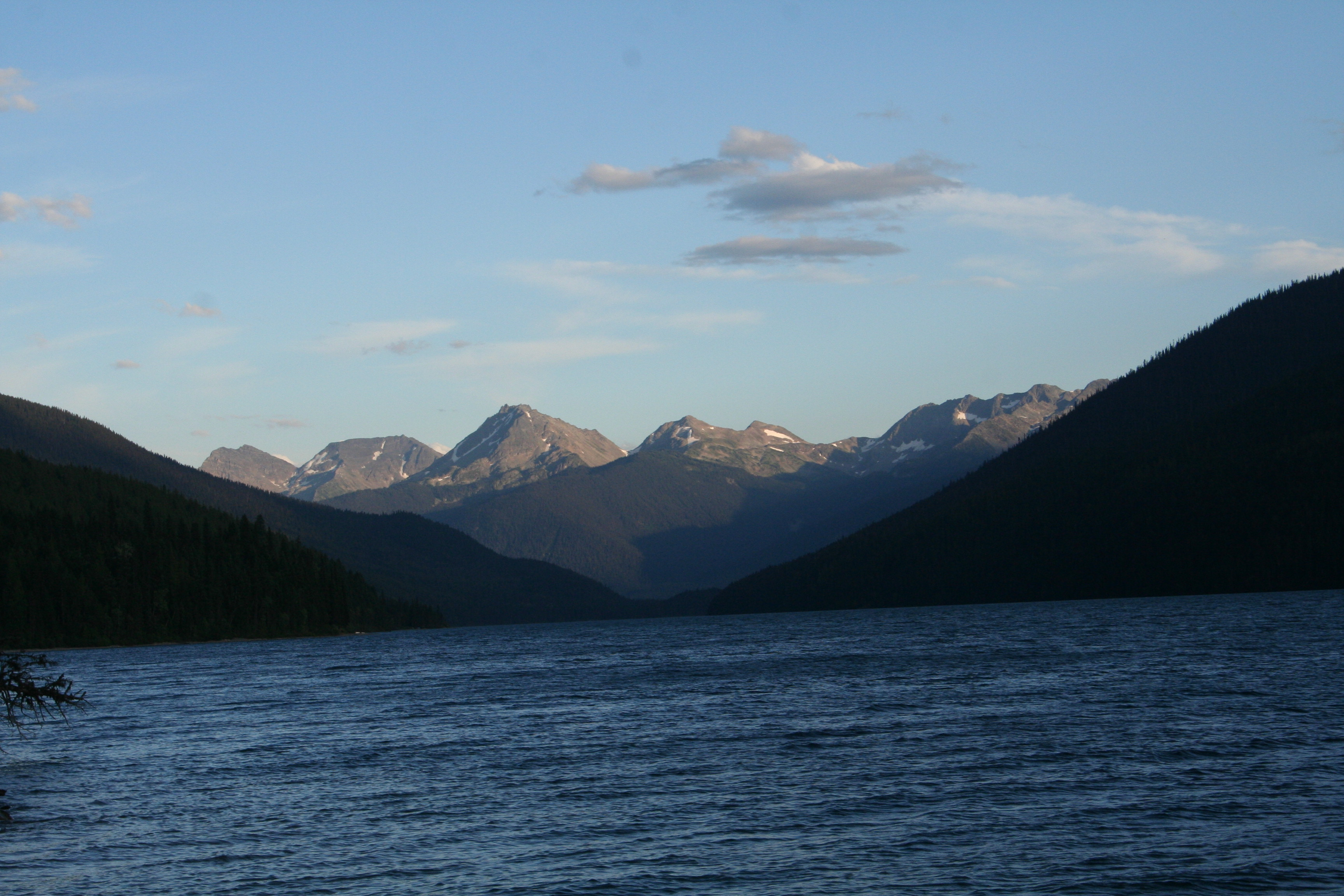
Cariboo Mountains from Isaac Lake

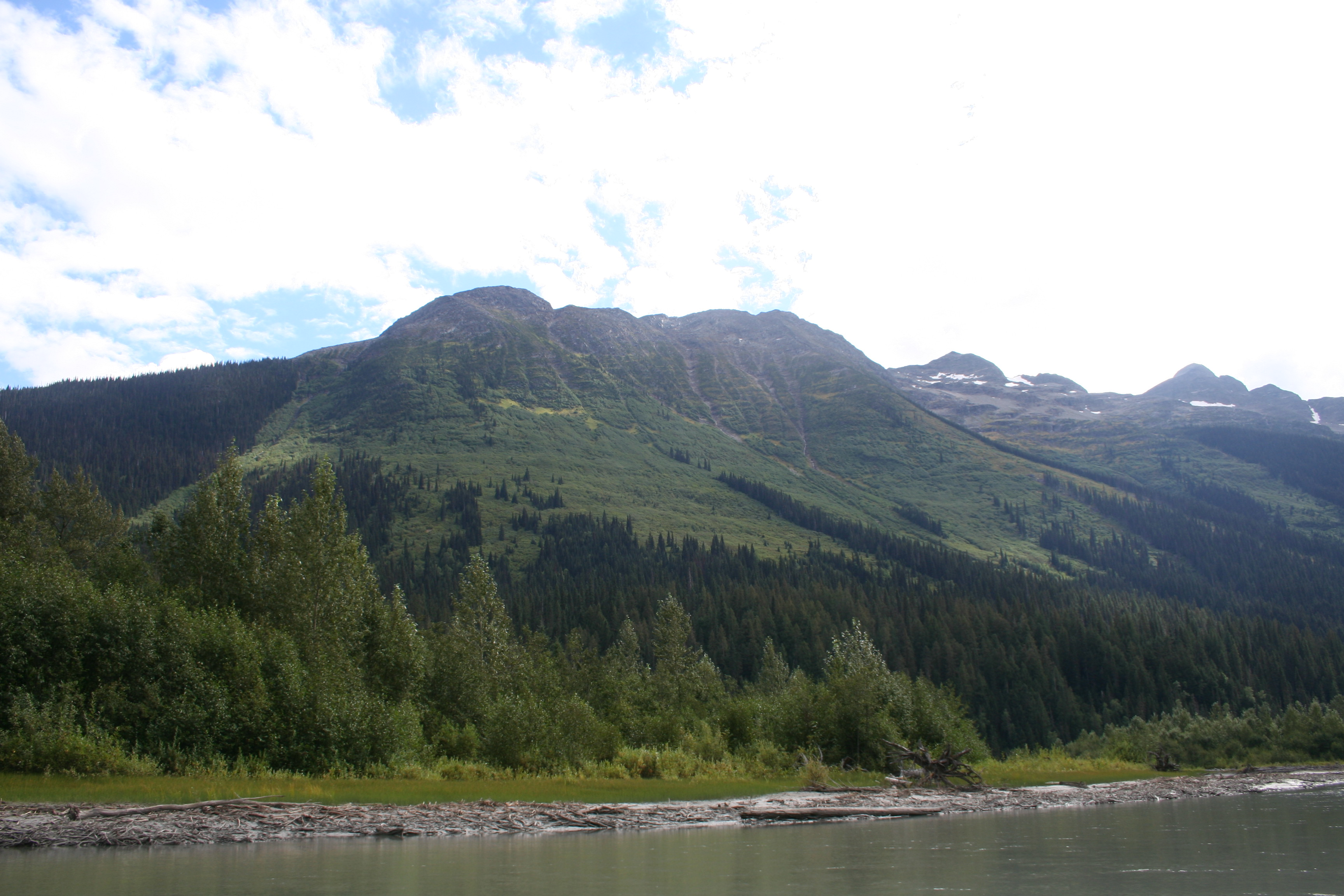
Ishpa Mountainside from Lanezi Lake

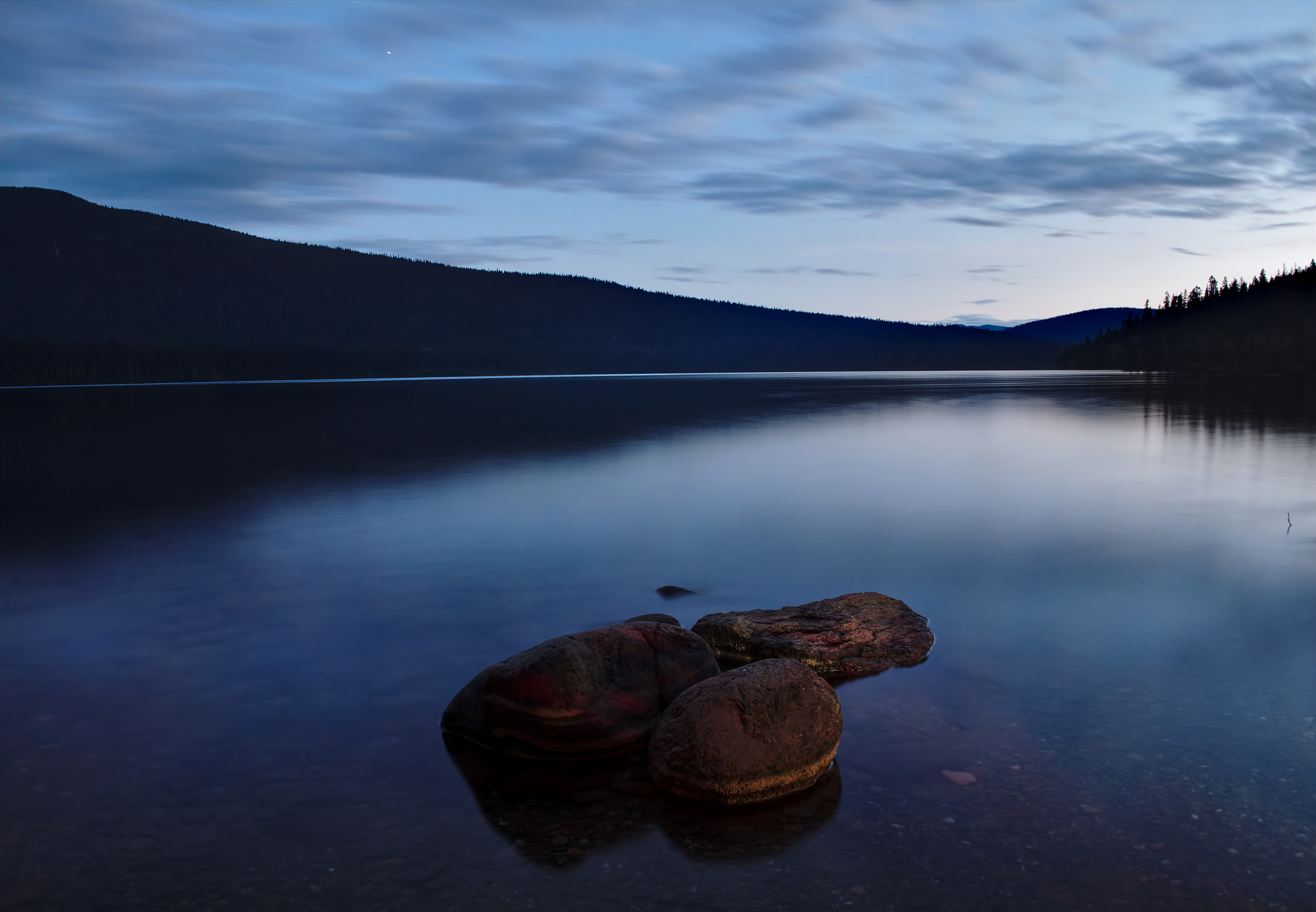
Indianpoint Lake

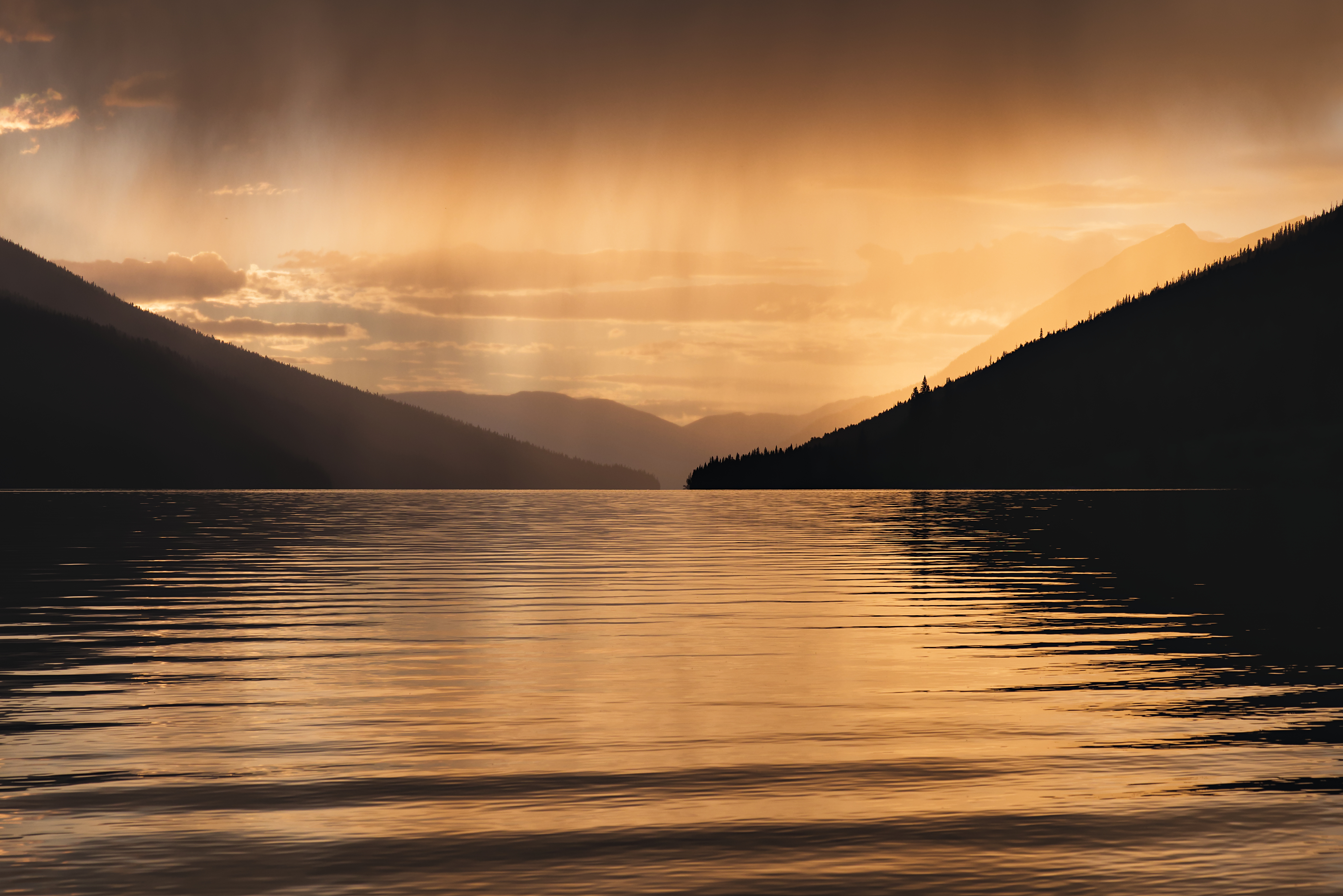
Isaac Lake before a storm

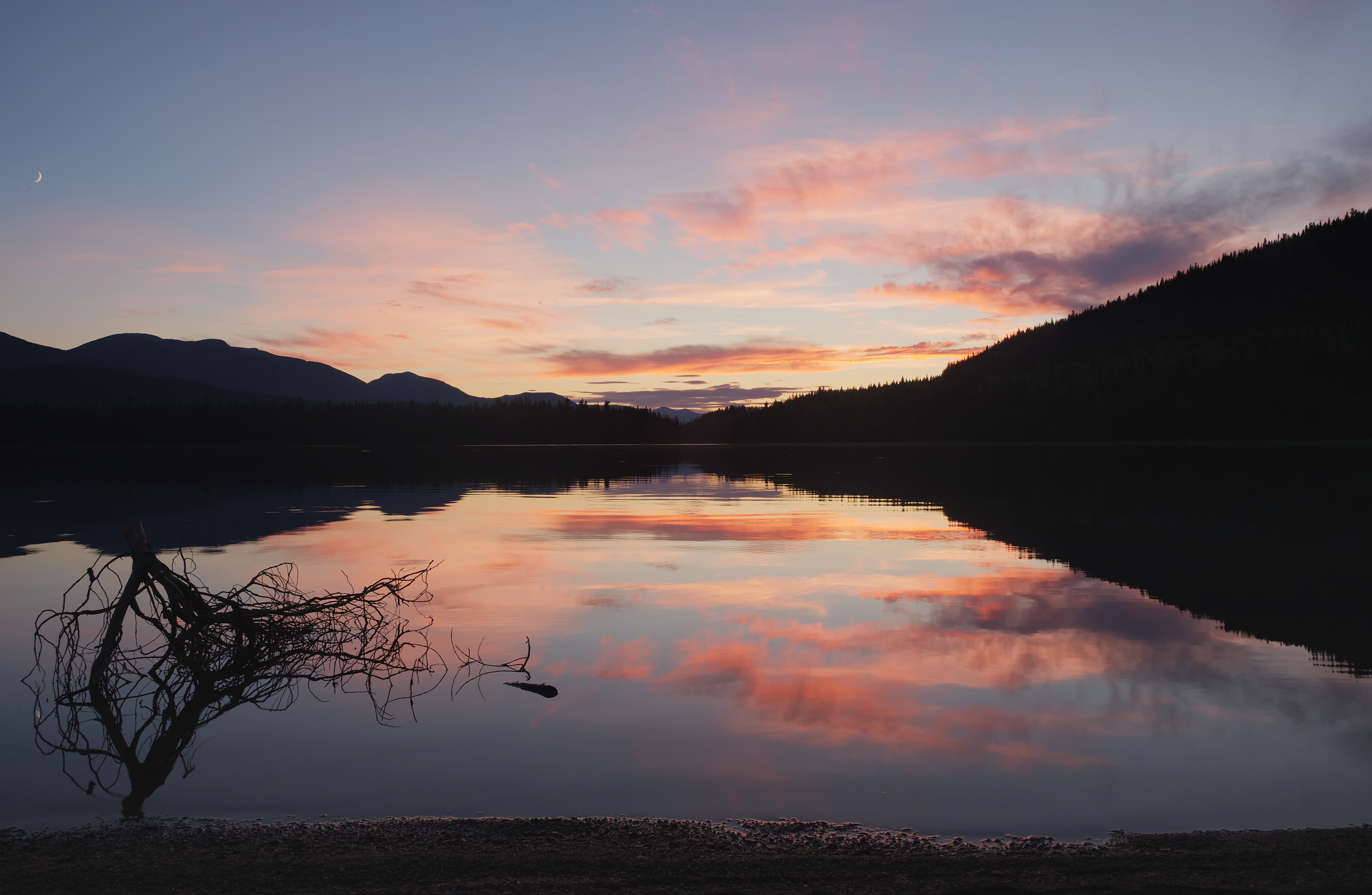
Sandy Lake during civil twilight

== See also ==
- List of British Columbia Provincial Parks
