= Kanahus Manuel =

- Other names: Kanahus Freedom, Amanda Soper
- Occupations: Indigenous Activist, Traditional Birthkeeper
- Known for: Freedom Babies
- Spouse: Orlando Watley (m. 2018)
- Children: 4

Kanahus Manuel, or Kanahus Freedom, (Secwepemc and Ktunaxa) is an indigenous activist in British Columbia, Canada. She is a birth keeper and a member of the activist group Tiny House Warriors.

She refused to register her four children with the government as a way to protest Canadian federal and provincial government regulation. She also used it as a statement of decolonisation, to stress her children's status as First Nations members.

== Family life ==
Manuel (Secwepemc) is a member of the Neskonlith band in British Columbia. Manuel was born as a twin (her sister is Mayuk Manuel) into a highly political family. They are the daughters of Beverly and Arthur Manuel. Their father is an activist, as was his father.

Their paternal grandfather was George Manuel, who served from 1970-1976 as national chief of the National Indian Brotherhood. and as founding president of the World Council of Indigenous Peoples. Her aunt Doreen Manuel is a filmmaker. Her aunt Vera Manuel is a poet and playwright.

In 2018, Manuel married Orlando Watley (Chickasaw), who has been held since 1994 in Calipatria State Prison, a maximum-security facility in California. According to the Orland Watley Innocence Project (see links below), Watley was acquitted of charges in a 1993 robbery/homicide. At the age of 19, he was arrested and falsely convicted in 1994 of charges of triple homicide. Maintaining that he is innocent, he has been incarcerated since then and is serving a life sentence.

Manuel has four children, all of whom were born outside a hospital. She did not register any of them for birth certificates, so they are undocumented. By birth, they would be classified as "status Indians" in Canada and entitled to certain benefits, but she did not want them to fall under government regulation.

== Activism ==
Manuel is well known for her activism against corporate development projects in British Columbia, Canada, both those directed to gain tourism, and industry. She has been opposed to such developments as Sun Peaks Resort and Imperial Metals, and protested the Mount Polley mine spill. Imperial Metals named her among others in gaining a court injunction against them to stop their blockades of the company's development.

Beginning in 2017, Manuel was part of the Tiny House Warriors movement to construct ten tiny houses to be placed in the path of the Trans Mountain pipeline. This action was a way of asserting control over the traditional Secwepemc territory, where the company proposed building part of the pipeline. On July 15, 2018 Manuel was arrested by the RCMP for her participation in the Tiny House Warrior resistance.

Manuel is the radio host and producer of Creating A Culture of Resistance, a show on Wolf Paw Radio that interviews activists from different cultures.

In October 2019, Manuel was arrested by the RCMP as part of a Tiny House Warrior protest against the Trans Mountain pipeline.

== Representation in other media ==
- She appeared in Freedom Babies (2018), a documentary film made by her aunt Doreen Manuel. The film explores Manuel's decision not to register her four children with provincial or federal Canadian governments.
- Manuel also was featured in Cody Lucich's documentary film Akicita: The Battle of Standing Rock (2018), which focuses on what were known as the Standing Rock protests of 2016-2017. Attracting thousands of activists, the occupation opposed construction of the Dakota Access Pipeline across and near indigenous territory in the United States.

== Writing ==
- Kanahus, Manuel. 2017. "Decolonization: The frontline struggle" in Whose Land Is It Anyway? A Manual for Decolonization. Federation of Post-Secondary Educators of BC.
