= Cariboo River =

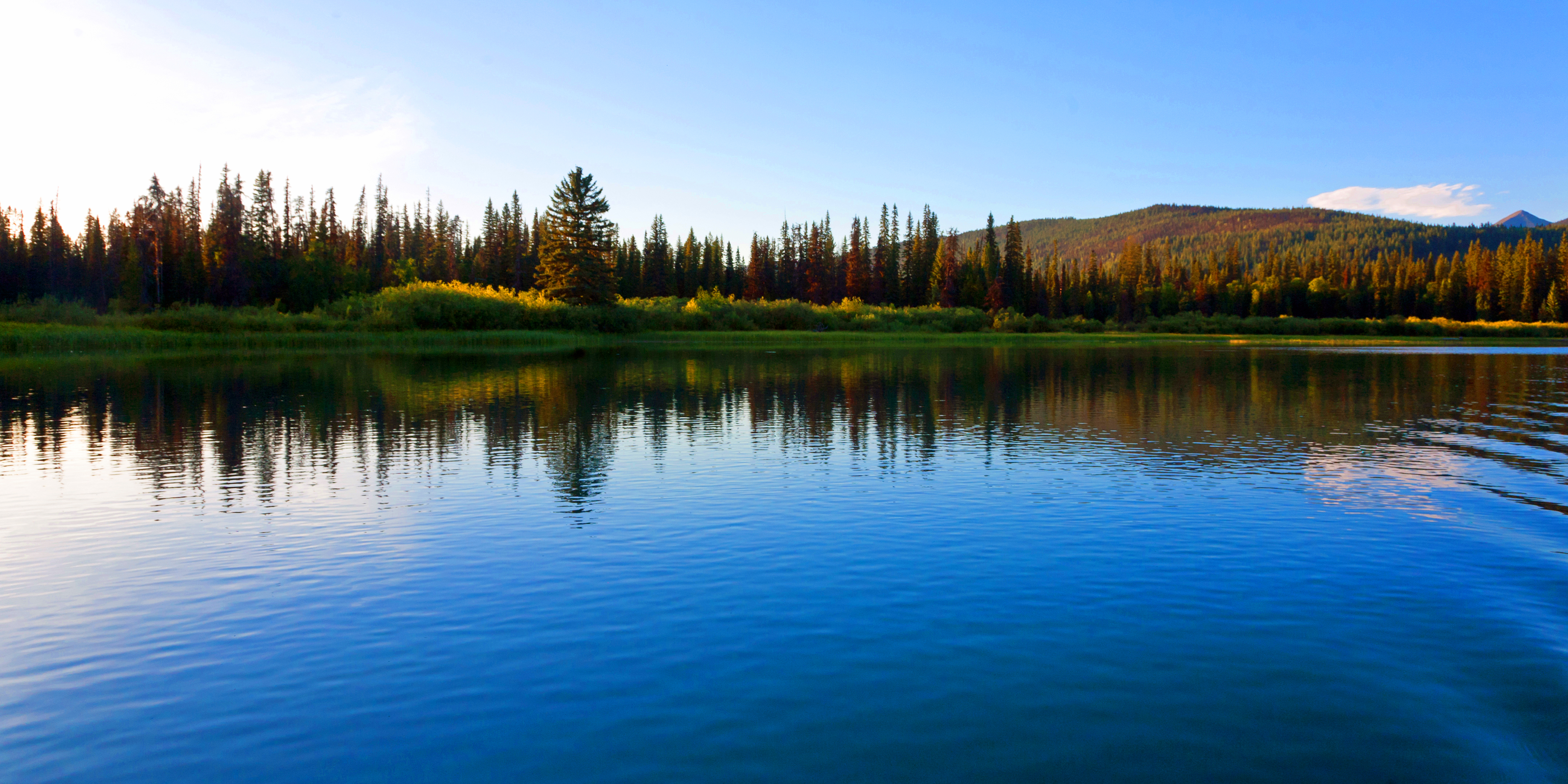

Location
- Country: Canada
- Province: British Columbia
- District: Cariboo Land District

Physical characteristics
- Source: Cariboo Mountains
  - location: Cariboo
  - coordinates: 53°2′20″N 120°29′50″W
  - elevation: 2,012 m (6,601 ft)
- Mouth: Quesnel River
  - location: Quesnel Forks, Cariboo
  - coordinates: 52°39′45″N 121°40′32″W
  - elevation: 642 m (2,106 ft)
- Basin size: 3,260 km^{2} (1,260 sq mi)
- Discharge
  - location: mouth
  - average: 93.4 m^{3}/s (3,300 cu ft/s)
  - minimum: 7.36 m^{3}/s (260 cu ft/s)
  - maximum: 626 m^{3}/s (22,100 cu ft/s)

Basin features
- Tributaries
  - left: Matthew River, Little River
  - right: Isaac River

The Cariboo River is a tributary of the Quesnel River, one of the main tributaries of the Fraser River, in the Canadian province of British Columbia. It flows through the Cariboo region of the British Columbia Interior, southeast of Prince George. Above Cariboo Lake it was formerly known as the Swamp River. The name was adopted, and replaced the former names, in 1936 in association with Cariboo Lake.

== Course ==
The Cariboo River's headwaters flow from many large ice fields in the Cariboo Mountains. It flows generally west, picking up numerous tributary streams, many also draining ice fields. After entering Bowron Lake Provincial Park, the Cariboo is joined by the Isaac River from the north, after which the Cariboo widens into Lanezi Lake, south of the Mowdish Range. At its western end Lanezi Lake empties into Sandy Lake, from which the Cariboo River flows first northwest, then abruptly south. It leaves Bowron Lake Provincial Park. The Matthew River then joins from the east. Farther south the Little River also joins from the east, after which the Cariboo River flows through Cariboo Lake. Cariboo River Provincial Park occupies the river valley north of Cariboo Lake. The Cariboo River flows south from Cariboo Lake, then turns west and empties into the Quesnel River at Quesnel Forks, northwest of Likely.

== See also ==
- List of tributaries of the Fraser River
- List of rivers of British Columbia
