= Cariboo River Provincial Park =

Provincial park in British Columbia, Canada

- IUCN category II (national park)
- Location within British Columbia
- Interactive map of Cariboo River Provincial Park
- Location: Cariboo Land District, British Columbia, Canada
- Nearest city: Quesnel, BC
- Coordinates: 52°51′59″N 121°12′40″W
- Area: 3,211 ha (7,930 acres)
- Established: May 19, 2010
- Governing body: BC Parks

Cariboo River Provincial Park is a provincial park in British Columbia, Canada, located between Barkerville and Likely in the upper Cariboo River basin.

Located between Kimball Lake and Cariboo Lake, the park was established in 1995, comprising 3,212 hectares. Its boundaries were revised in 2010, the total area now being 3,211 hectares.
