= Mitchell River (Quesnel River tributary) =

Location
- Country: Canada
- Province: British Columbia
- District: Kootenay Land District

Physical characteristics
- Mouth: Quesnel River
  - coordinates: 52°47′00″N 120°49′00″W

The Mitchell River is a tributary of the Quesnel River, approximately 30 miles (48 km) long, near the eastern boundary of British Columbia, Canada. It originates in glaciers in the northern Columbia Mountains and flows generally southwest through Mitchell Lake into Quesnel Lake, and its water eventually travels down the Fraser River to the Pacific Ocean. Almost half of its course is flooded in natural lakes. Mitchell Lake, about 7 miles (11 km) long, is near the middle of the Mitchell River's course, and the river's lower 10 miles (16 km) are flooded by Quesnel Lake, although both bodies of water are natural.

== See also ==
- List of rivers of British Columbia
