= Big Canyon =

Stretch of the Quesnel River in British Columbia, Canada

Coordinates: 53°00′01″N 122°23′02″W

The Big Canyon is a stretch of the Quesnel River in the Cariboo Country of the Central Interior of British Columbia, Canada, near the city of the same name.

== See also ==
- Little Canyon (Quesnel)
