= Little Canyon (Skeena) =

Coordinates: 54°31′N 128°33′W

The Little Canyon is a stretch of the Skeena River near the city of Terrace, British Columbia, Canada in the northwestern part of that province. The canyon was named for Dudley Little, one of the founders of the city of Terrace. The canyon lies upstream from Ferry Island and below the adjacent railway and highway bridge.

Waterfalls at this location are named "Ksip-kee-agh" in the Tsimshian language.

== Little Canyon of the Zymoetz ==
Another Little Canyon in the area is on the Zymoetz River but its name is unofficial and used only locally.

== See also ==
- Kitselas Canyon
- Little Canyon (Quesnel)
