= Dudley George Little =

Canadian politician

MLA for Skeena
- In office 1960–1972

Personal details
- Born: June 9, 1914 Terrace, British Columbia
- Died: October 14, 1972 (aged 58) Terrace, British Columbia
- Party: Social Credit Party of British Columbia

Dudley George Little (1914 – 1972) was a business owner and political figure in the Canadian province of British Columbia. He represented Skeena in the Legislative Assembly of British Columbia from 1960 to 1972 as a Social Credit member.

He was born on June 9, 1914, in Terrace, British Columbia, the son of George Little and Clara Beate, and was educated there. In 1938, Little married Mary Catherine Welch. He served on the municipal council for Terrace. Little was a building supply company owner. He died on October 14, 1972.

The Little Canyon was named after him.
