= Horsefly weed =

Horsefly weed, horsefly-weed, or horseflyweed is a common name for several plants, and may refer to:

- Baptisia australis, native to central and eastern United States
- Baptisia tinctoria, native to the eastern United States
