= Horsefly, British Columbia =

Horsefly
- Unincorporated Community
- Location of Horsefly in British Columbia
- Coordinates: 52°19′59″N 121°25′04″W
- Country: Canada
- Province: British Columbia
- Region: Cariboo
- Regional district: Cariboo
- Elevation: 770 m (2,530 ft)

Population
  - Total: 1,000
- Time zone: UTC−07:00 (PT)
- Area codes: 250, 778, 236, & 672
- Website: Official website

Horsefly is an unincorporated community on the northwest shore of the Horsefly River, in the Cariboo region of central British Columbia. The location, via BC Highway 97, Likely Rd, and Horsefly Rd, is about 67 kilometres (42 mi) northeast of Williams Lake, and by road 22 kilometres (14 mi) south of Quesnel Lake.

== Mining ==
Peter Dunlevey's party of prospectors is credited with the first discovery of gold in the Cariboo Gold Rush near the site of the present village. However, evidence indicates H.O. Bowe's party arrived weeks earlier to the Horsefly River in the summer of 1859. That year, at least four separate groups found gold. During the following years, small placer operations existed. In 1884, Thaddeus Harper obtained sizable mining leases, but his operations from 1886 to 1888 were unsuccessful. In 1891, R.T. Ward, who had bought or leased the Harper claims, found paying ground. Called the Horsefly Gold Mining Co., activities continued until 1902. From 1891, the Miocene Gravel Mining Co undertook underground hard-rock mining. About 8 kilometres (5 mi) downstream was a hydraulic mining operation. Soon called the Horsefly Hydraulic Mining Co., those operations existed until 1899.

== Name origin ==
The settlement was known as Harper's Camp, after Thaddeus Harper, a rancher and miner. In 1920, residents voted to rename the village Horsefly. The name derived from the Horsefly River and Horsefly Lake, so designated by the early pioneers because of the prevalence of horseflies during the summertime. The numerous horseflies and mosquitoes forced people and horses to cover their heads with cloth hoods.

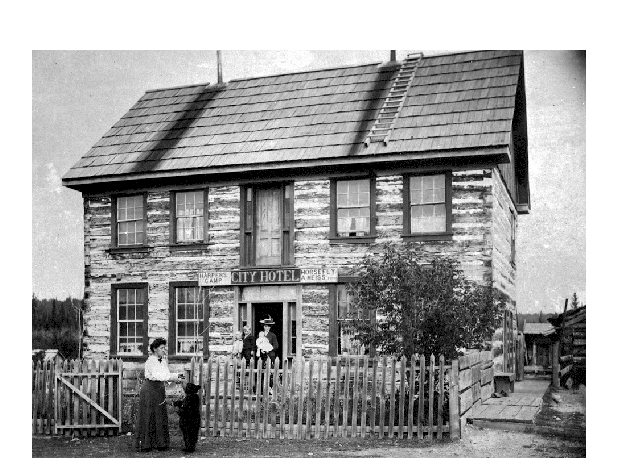
Harper's Camp City Hotel (1900s)

== Early community ==
By the 1890s, the town served the miners and ranchers of the area. In 1896, Minnie Hazel Walters was the first Caucasian child born in the town. That year, Alex Meiss established a small hotel, as did Harry Walters the following year. Harry was the inaugural postmaster 1897–1905. A separate post office operated 1895–1908 downstream at the mining operation.

In 1902, a branch of Harvey Bailey Co. (Ashcroft) established a store. In 1904, Meiss, built a three-storey hotel with 14 rooms. In 1910, he owned the first car in the community. That year, Annie Moore was the inaugural school teacher. In 1912, a toll bridge superseded fording the river. The next year, Chelsey Bell and his sister Lena opened a store in the Walter's hotel, later relocating to larger premises.

== Later community ==
Having about 1,000 residents in the vicinity, Horsefly is a popular tourist destination with a forestry based economy. Sockeye salmon return each fall to spawn in the Horsefly River.

Around 2005, internet connectivity came. In 2021, ABC Communications, the only provider of fibre optic service, upgraded the speed and reliability of the internet. Horsefly has a general store, a gas station, a post office, several small businesses, and an elementary school. It also has the Horsefly Volunteer Fire Department, one of the premier volunteer fire departments in British Columbia.

== Climate ==
Horsefly has a humid continental climate, with warm summers, and moderately cold, snowy winters.

Climate data for Horsefly (Gruhs Lake)
Month	Jan	Feb	Mar	Apr	May	Jun	Jul	Aug	Sep	Oct	Nov	Dec	Year
Record high °C (°F)	12.2 (54.0)	14.0 (57.2)	19.5 (67.1)	25.0 (77.0)	31.5 (88.7)	33.3 (91.9)	36.0 (96.8)	33.3 (91.9)	34.0 (93.2)	26.5 (79.7)	16.1 (61.0)	15.6 (60.1)	36.0 (96.8)
Mean daily maximum °C (°F)	−2.3 (27.9)	2.0 (35.6)	6.7 (44.1)	12.5 (54.5)	17.2 (63.0)	20.4 (68.7)	23.1 (73.6)	22.8 (73.0)	18.2 (64.8)	10.4 (50.7)	2.9 (37.2)	−1.5 (29.3)	11.0 (51.9)
Daily mean °C (°F)	−7.0 (19.4)	−4.0 (24.8)	0.3 (32.5)	5.4 (41.7)	10.0 (50.0)	13.5 (56.3)	15.8 (60.4)	15.0 (59.0)	10.7 (51.3)	4.9 (40.8)	−1.0 (30.2)	−5.6 (21.9)	4.8 (40.7)
Mean daily minimum °C (°F)	−11.6 (11.1)	−10.0 (14.0)	−6.0 (21.2)	−1.8 (28.8)	2.8 (37.0)	6.5 (43.7)	8.4 (47.1)	7.2 (45.0)	3.1 (37.6)	−0.6 (30.9)	−4.8 (23.4)	−9.6 (14.7)	−1.4 (29.5)
Record low °C (°F)	−43.0 (−45.4)	−44.4 (−47.9)	−40.6 (−41.1)	−18.3 (−0.9)	−7.2 (19.0)	−1.7 (28.9)	0.0 (32.0)	−3.0 (26.6)	−7.8 (18.0)	−18.0 (−0.4)	−32.2 (−26.0)	−43.5 (−46.3)	−44.4 (−47.9)
Average precipitation mm (inches)	55.5 (2.19)	25.9 (1.02)	27.6 (1.09)	32.8 (1.29)	55.3 (2.18)	77.3 (3.04)	69.8 (2.75)	57.4 (2.26)	43.9 (1.73)	53.8 (2.12)	59.3 (2.33)	54.9 (2.16)	613.5 (24.16)
Average rainfall mm (inches)	9.4 (0.37)	3.7 (0.15)	9.6 (0.38)	28.6 (1.13)	53.0 (2.09)	77.3 (3.04)	69.8 (2.75)	57.4 (2.26)	43.9 (1.73)	48.2 (1.90)	24.5 (0.96)	4.3 (0.17)	429.7 (16.93)
Average snowfall cm (inches)	46.1 (18.1)	22.2 (8.7)	18.0 (7.1)	4.1 (1.6)	2.3 (0.9)	0.0 (0.0)	0.0 (0.0)	0.0 (0.0)	0.0 (0.0)	5.6 (2.2)	34.8 (13.7)	50.7 (20.0)	183.8 (72.3)
Average extreme snow depth cm (inches)	91 (36)	81 (32)	72 (28)	40 (16)	12 (4.7)	0 (0)	0 (0)	0 (0)	0 (0)	25 (9.8)	37 (15)	95 (37)	95 (37)
Average precipitation days (≥ 0.2 mm)	13.1	8.8	10.1	9.6	13.1	17.0	14.2	12.3	10.9	14.1	13.5	12.5	149.2
Average rainy days (≥ 0.2 mm)	2.6	2.3	5.2	8.7	12.8	17.0	14.2	12.3	10.9	13.1	6.8	1.7	107.6
Average snowy days (≥ 0.2 cm)	11.8	7.1	6.3	2.0	0.5	0.0	0.0	0.0	0.0	2.0	8.7	11.8	50.2
Source: 1981-2010 Environment Canada
