= Quesnel River =

River in Canada

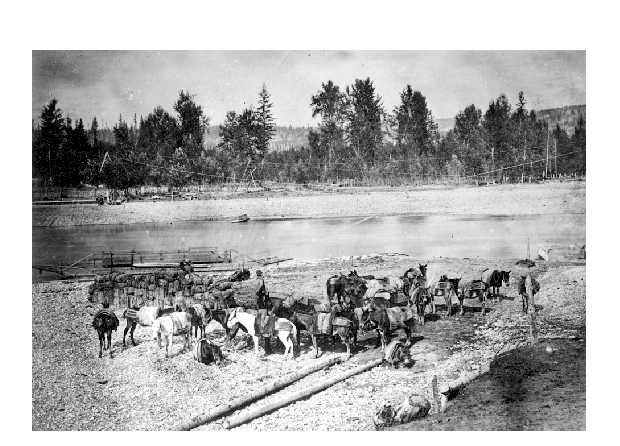
- Mule train at the Quesnel River 1868

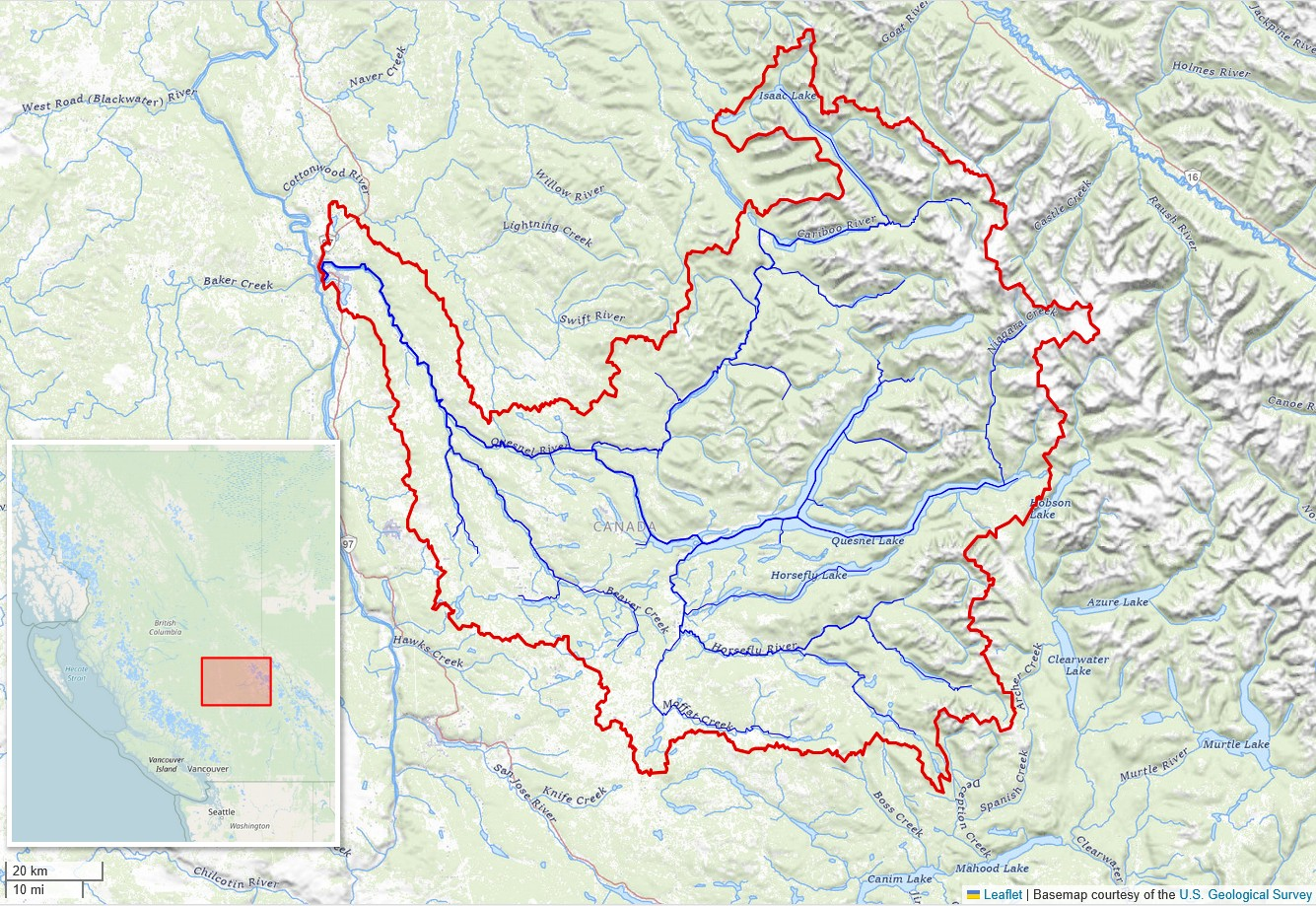
- Quesnel River Watershed (Interactive Map)

Location
- Country: Canada
- Province: British Columbia
- District: Cariboo Land District

Physical characteristics
- Source: Quesnel Lake
  - location: Likely, British Columbia
  - coordinates: 52°36′55″N 121°34′23″W
  - elevation: 724 m (2,375 ft)
- Mouth: Fraser River
  - location: Quesnel
  - coordinates: 52°58′14″N 122°29′52″W
  - elevation: 468 m (1,535 ft)
- Length: 100 km (62 mi)
- Basin size: 11,500 km^{2} (4,400 sq mi)
- Discharge
  - location: near Quesnel
  - average: 238 m^{3}/s (8,400 cu ft/s)
  - minimum: 27.8 m^{3}/s (980 cu ft/s)
  - maximum: 1,140 m^{3}/s (40,000 cu ft/s)

Basin features
- Tributaries
  - right: Mitchell River (Quesnel River)

The Quesnel River /kwɪˈnɛl/ is a major tributary of the Fraser River in the Cariboo District of central British Columbia. It begins at the outflow of Quesnel Lake, at the town of Likely and flows for about 100 kilometres (60 mi) northwest to its confluence with the Fraser at the city of Quesnel.

== History ==
Just downstream from the outlet of Quesnel Lake, at the confluence of the Cariboo River, is the historically important ghost town of Quesnel Forks, a.k.a. "the Forks", which was a junction point of the Quesnel and Cariboo Rivers. Various trails and wagon roads leading to the Cariboo goldfields lay across the low-hill range north of Quesnel Forks in the basin of the Cottonwood River. Both the Lillooet to Fort Alexandria wagon road and the later Cariboo Wagon Road came by Quesnel Forks but preferred to follow the valley of the Quesnel River to Quesnel and then east from there to the gold towns of Barkerville and Wells.

The river took its name from Jules-Maurice Quesnel, who explored this region with Simon Fraser in 1808.

== Natural history ==
The Quesnel River supports a number of fish species, the most significant of which are Sockeye salmon (Oncorhynchus nerka), Rainbow trout (Oncorhynchus mykiss), Largescale sucker (Catostomus macrocheilus), Longnose sucker (Catostomus catostomus), Redside shiner (Richardsonius balteatus), Northern pikeminnow (Ptychocheilus oregonensis), Peamouth chub (Mylocheilus caurinus), and Lake chub (Couesius plumbeus).

The salmon run of sockeye salmon experienced a major recovery in the late 20th century, sometimes surpassing the Adams River as the greatest sockeye producer in the Fraser basin. However, the river, wildlife, and nearby water sources is threatened by 10 million cubic meters of contaminated mine waste that escaped in August 2014.

== See also ==
- List of tributaries of the Fraser River
- Big Canyon
- Little Canyon
- List of rivers of British Columbia
- Mount Polley mine
