= Quesnel Forks =

- Location of Quesnel Forks in British Columbia
- Coordinates: 52°39′44.00″N 121°39′42.00″W
- Country: Canada
- Province: British Columbia

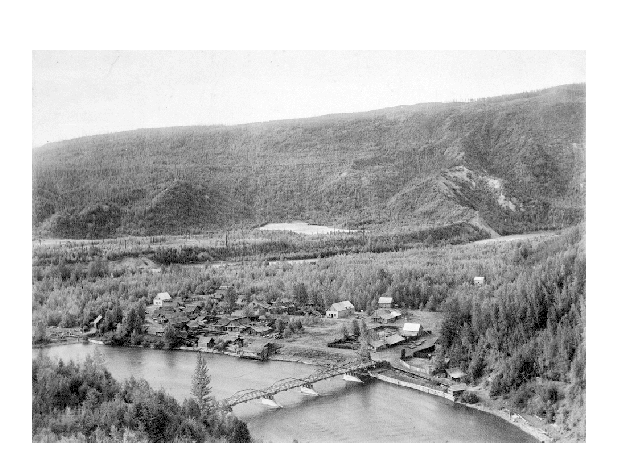
Quesnel Forks 1885

Quesnel Forks, historically Quesnelle Forks, also simply known as "The Forks" or grandly known as "Quesnel City" is a ghost town in the Cariboo region of British Columbia, Canada. It is located the junction of the Quesnel and Cariboo Rivers and is 60 km southeast of Quesnel and only 11 km northwest of Likely.

== History ==
Quesnel Forks was founded in 1860 and was a major supply center for the Cariboo Gold Rush. Between 1860 and 1862 it catered to 2,000 or more transient miners annually and a resident population of approximately 100. When gold was discovered on Antler, Lightning and Williams Creek, on the north side of the Snowshoe Plateau, prospectors and packers continued to use the route via Quesnel Forks until a decent trail system was established via the Quesnel and the Cottonwood rivers. The Quesnel Forks Bridge (initially a toll bridge) provided the only access to the village and the mining regions of Keithley Creek and the Snowshoe Plateau until the 1920s. However, when the Cariboo Wagon Road was completed in 1865, Quesnel Forks was bypassed and Barkerville became the major center of gold mining activity.

By the mid-1870s most of the population had left, but a small, stable group of Chinese miners and merchants remained in Quesnel Forks which supported a widely dispersed mining community. Many of these people came from the Four Counties region of Guangdong Province, South China. Following completion of the Canadian Pacific Railway through Ashcroft in 1885 their population increased when discharged Chinese railroad labourers sought to make a living from gold mining. They were supported by a branch of the Chee Kung Tong Association who erected a two-storey building in the village. During that period the region contained the third largest group of Chinese residents after Victoria and Nanaimo. The CPR also facilitated a hydraulic mining boom in the Cariboo, delivering large mining equipment such as water canon and metal for pipes to Ashcroft. From there, ox teams and stage coaches transported equipment and mining speculators up the Cariboo Road to The Forks. The Bullion Pit mine nearby produced $1,233,936 (1900 dollar value) over eleven years and attracted large numbers of itinerant men who placed heavy demands on the resources of the village. The horse trail to the Cariboo Road was widened into a wagon road and the Quesnel Forks Bridge strengthened to accommodate heavy wagons in 1895. In that same year a new jail was built at the rear of the Government Agent's house (shown at the head of the bridge in the above photo which should be dated 1899) and the land around these buildings kept vacant in case of fire. The town was not abandoned until the 1950s.

== Modern day ==
Today, visitors to Quesnel Forks can explore the restored pioneer buildings and historic cemetery. Historical research and work projects began in the 1990s under the leadership of the Likely Cemetery Society and teacher/historian David Falconer. The cemetery area was cleared and secured, graves identified with headboards, and the Chee Kung Tong house stabilized with the assistance of local residents. Thanks to people like Brian Giesbrecht and his crew who have been restoring the old buildings to save them from a slow death into the soil, and from the river which is slowly eating away at the banks of the ghost town (half the town has been swept into the river over the past 8 years).

== Television ==
Quesnel Forks was featured on the historical television series Gold Trails and Ghost Towns, season 1, episode 8.
