= Likely, British Columbia =

Likely
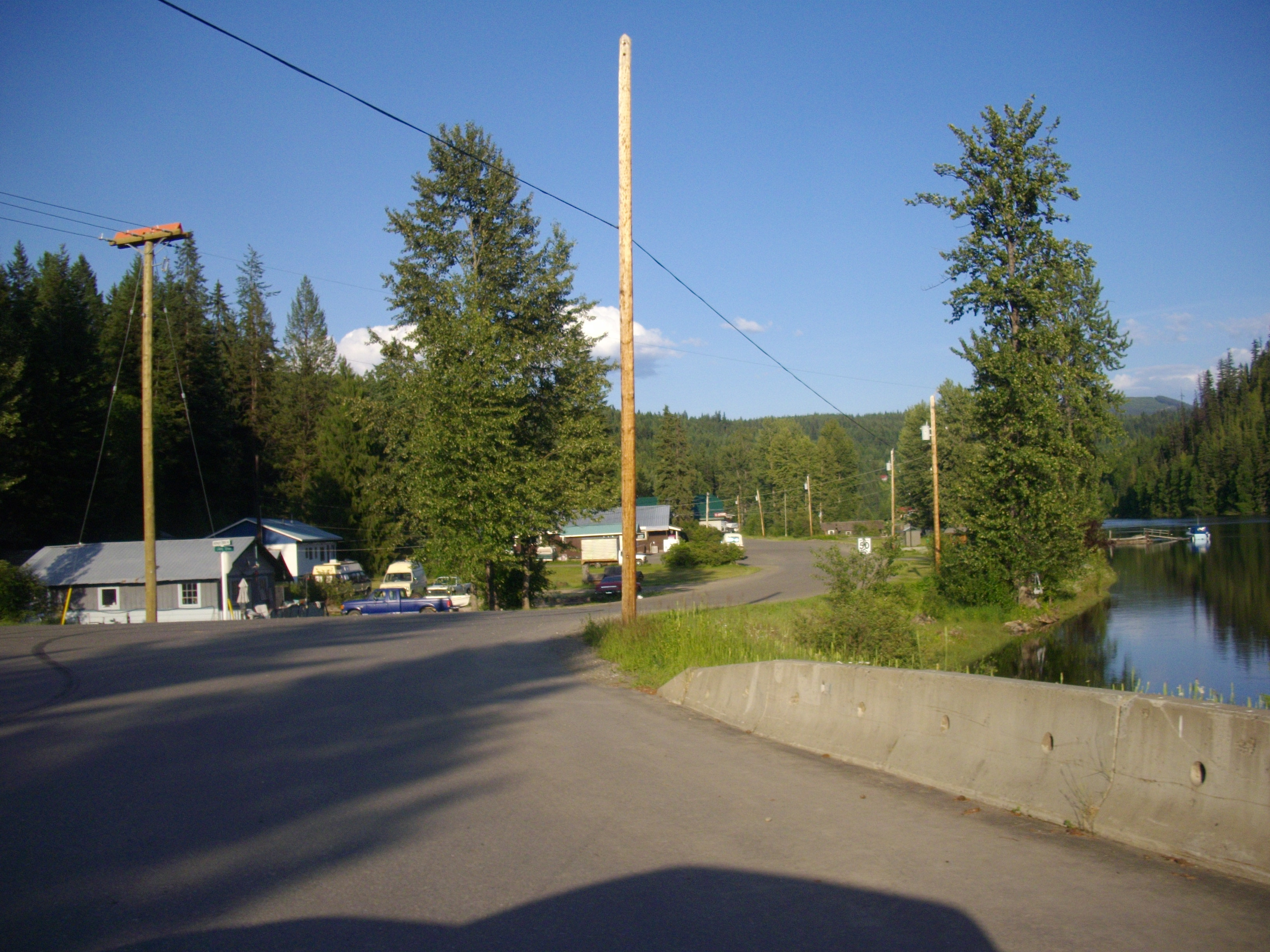
- Downtown Likely

- Location of Likely Likely (Canada) Likely (North America)
- Coordinates: 52°37′00″N 121°33′49″W
- Country: Canada
- Province: British Columbia
- Region: North Cariboo
- Regional district: Cariboo Regional District
- Founded: 1923

Government
  - Governing body: Cariboo Regional District
  - MP: Todd Doherty (Conservative)
  - MLA: Coralee Oakes (Liberal)
- Elevation: 871 m (2,858 ft)

Population
  - Total: 350
- Time zone: UTC−07:00 (PT)
- Waterways: Quesnel River

Likely is an unincorporated community in British Columbia, Canada. It is located in the Cariboo region of the province, and is situated where the west arm of Quesnel Lake empties into the Quesnel River. Roads from Likely lead southwest to Williams Lake, northwest to Quesnel, south to Horsefly, and north to Barkerville. Likely is in the Quesnel Highland, a transition zone between the Cariboo Plateau and the Cariboo Mountains.

== History ==
Likely is one of the few remaining Cariboo Gold Rush settlements. Likely was originally called Quesnel Dam. The name was changed to honour prospector John A. Likely (1842-1929) of the Bullion Pit Mine, who was affectionately called "Plato" for his tendency to philosophize. He lies in an unmarked grave in Kamloops Cemetery.

The Quesnel River was dammed near Likely in 1898 to enable downriver areas to be explored for gold. One such site became the Bullion Pit mine, which operated from 1892 to 1942. In 1935, this mine became the site of the largest hydraulic monitors ever installed in North America. (Hydraulic monitors are high-pressure and high-volume water nozzles used to wash down large volumes of gold bearing gravel in placer mining. Over 64 kilometres of canals drew water from nearby creeks and lakes to feed the hydraulic nozzles, which used more water each day than the entire city of Vancouver did at the time. Today, the Bullion Pit stands as an astonishing man-made canyon measuring 3 kilometres long by 400 feet (120 m) deep. It displaced 12,000,000 cubic yards (9,200,000 m^{3}) of gravel.

Bactrian camels were used as pack animals during the Cariboo Gold Rush. One was shot at Beaver Valley, near Likely, by a prospector named Morris when he mistook it for a giant grizzly bear.

== Environmental issues ==
On 4 August 2014, the tailings pond of the Mount Polley mine was breached, spilling water and tailing sediment and silt into Polley Lake and Quesnel Lake. Subsequent water quality analysis showed no changes to water quality. A drinking water ban was lifted for all areas except a small area adjacent to the tailing pond at Polley Lake.

== Recreation ==
Quesnel Lake is the largest lake in the Cariboo, with the North Arm extending 77 kilometres and the East Arm reaching out 100 kilometres. It contains many different fish including, 10 to 16 pound rainbow trout, lake trout up to 30 or 40 pounds, and kokanee which can all be caught by fishers. Tree species in the area include black cottonwood, western hemlock, western red cedar, Engelmann spruce, and subalpine fir.

A highlight of a visit to Likely in late summer includes watching thousands of salmon migrate up the Quesnel River to their spawning grounds in the Horsefly and Mitchell Rivers. Visitors can also explore the historic ghost town of Quesnel Forks, only 11 km to the northwest.

Cedar Point Park is located 6 kilometers away from the town on the shores of Quesnel Lake, operating as a campground from March 15 to October 31,. One of the Twin Giants (huge Vulcan steam shovels purchased in 1906 to dig a canal from Spanish Lake to the Bullion Mines) lies there. The shovels weighed approximately 22,000 pounds each, and were shipped in pieces from Toledo, Ohio. Transported first by rail then by wagon to a site below the dam on Spanish Lake, they were assembled and placed on railway tracks to begin digging the ditch. It was reported that $20,000 were spent before the operations were suspended, leaving the shovels where they stopped work in the year 1907. (The other Twin Giant is now in Quesnel).

== Climate ==
Likely has a humid continental climate (Köppen Dfb) with mild summers with quite high diurnal temperature variations along with cold winters with high snowfall.

Climate data for Likely, BC (1971–2000 normals)
Month	Jan	Feb	Mar	Apr	May	Jun	Jul	Aug	Sep	Oct	Nov	Dec	Year
Record high °C (°F)	11.5 (52.7)	14.5 (58.1)	16 (61)	29.4 (84.9)	35 (95)	33 (91)	34 (93)	34 (93)	34.5 (94.1)	23.5 (74.3)	16.7 (62.1)	11 (52)	35 (95)
Mean daily maximum °C (°F)	−2.9 (26.8)	0.6 (33.1)	5.8 (42.4)	11.3 (52.3)	16.3 (61.3)	19.8 (67.6)	22.7 (72.9)	22.3 (72.1)	17.3 (63.1)	10.6 (51.1)	2.5 (36.5)	−2.1 (28.2)	11.2 (52.2)
Daily mean °C (°F)	−7.0 (19.4)	−4.4 (24.1)	−0.1 (31.8)	4.6 (40.3)	9.3 (48.7)	12.9 (55.2)	15.4 (59.7)	15.1 (59.2)	10.7 (51.3)	5.4 (41.7)	−1.2 (29.8)	−5.7 (21.7)	4.6 (40.3)
Mean daily minimum °C (°F)	−11.1 (12.0)	−9.4 (15.1)	−6.1 (21.0)	−2.1 (28.2)	2.3 (36.1)	6 (43)	8.1 (46.6)	7.8 (46.0)	4 (39)	0.1 (32.2)	−4.8 (23.4)	−9.2 (15.4)	−1.2 (29.8)
Record low °C (°F)	−37.5 (−35.5)	−34.5 (−30.1)	−31.1 (−24.0)	−13.9 (7.0)	−6 (21)	−3 (27)	2.5 (36.5)	−2.5 (27.5)	−5.5 (22.1)	−25 (−13)	−35.5 (−31.9)	−38.5 (−37.3)	−38.5 (−37.3)
Average precipitation mm (inches)	60.9 (2.40)	41.7 (1.64)	35.5 (1.40)	41.8 (1.65)	55 (2.2)	81.8 (3.22)	59.7 (2.35)	67.2 (2.65)	51.6 (2.03)	59.4 (2.34)	60.6 (2.39)	77.4 (3.05)	692.4 (27.26)
Average snowfall cm (inches)	49.7 (19.6)	33.4 (13.1)	22.1 (8.7)	8.6 (3.4)	0.4 (0.2)	0.0 (0.0)	0.0 (0.0)	0.0 (0.0)	0.0 (0.0)	5.7 (2.2)	29.7 (11.7)	65.5 (25.8)	215.2 (84.7)
Source: Environment Canada
