= Little Canyon (Quesnel) =

Coordinates: 52°53′15″N 122°16′10″W

The Little Canyon is a stretch of the Quesnel River in the Cariboo Country of the Central Interior of British Columbia, Canada, near the city of the same name.

== See also ==
- Big Canyon
