= Horsefly Lake Provincial Park =

Canadian provincial park

- IUCN category II (national park)
- Location within British Columbia
- Interactive map of Horsefly Lake Provincial Park
- Location: Cariboo Land District, British Columbia, Canada
- Nearest city: Prince George, British Columbia
- Coordinates: 52°23′19″N 121°17′15″W
- Area: 186 ha (1.86 km^{2}; 460 acres)
- Established: August 15, 1974
- Governing body: BC Parks
- Website: bcparks.ca/explore/parkpgs/horsefly_lk/

Horsefly Lake Provincial Park is a provincial park in British Columbia, Canada. It is 186 hectares (1.86 km^{2}; 460 acres) in size and is located south of Prince George.
