= Horsefly River =

Location
- Country: Canada
- Province: British Columbia

Physical characteristics
- Source: Near Wells Gray Provincial Park
  - coordinates: 52°22′N 120°31′W
- Mouth: Quesnel River
  - coordinates: 52°28′N 121°23′W
- Length: 98 km (61 mi)

The Horsefly River is a river in the Cariboo district of British Columbia, Canada. Originating near the Wells Gray Provincial Park, it flows into Quesnel Lake, the source of the Quesnel River which in turn is a major tributary of the Fraser River. The Horsefly River is the largest inflow for Quesnel Lake, draining 2750 km^{2} of the Interior Plateau. It is also a spawning ground for sockeye, chinook and coho salmon. Fossil insects, fish and plants have been collected from Eocene Epoch lake sediments exposed along the river banks.

== See also ==
- List of rivers of British Columbia
