= Quesnel Lake =

Glacial lake in British Columbia, Canada

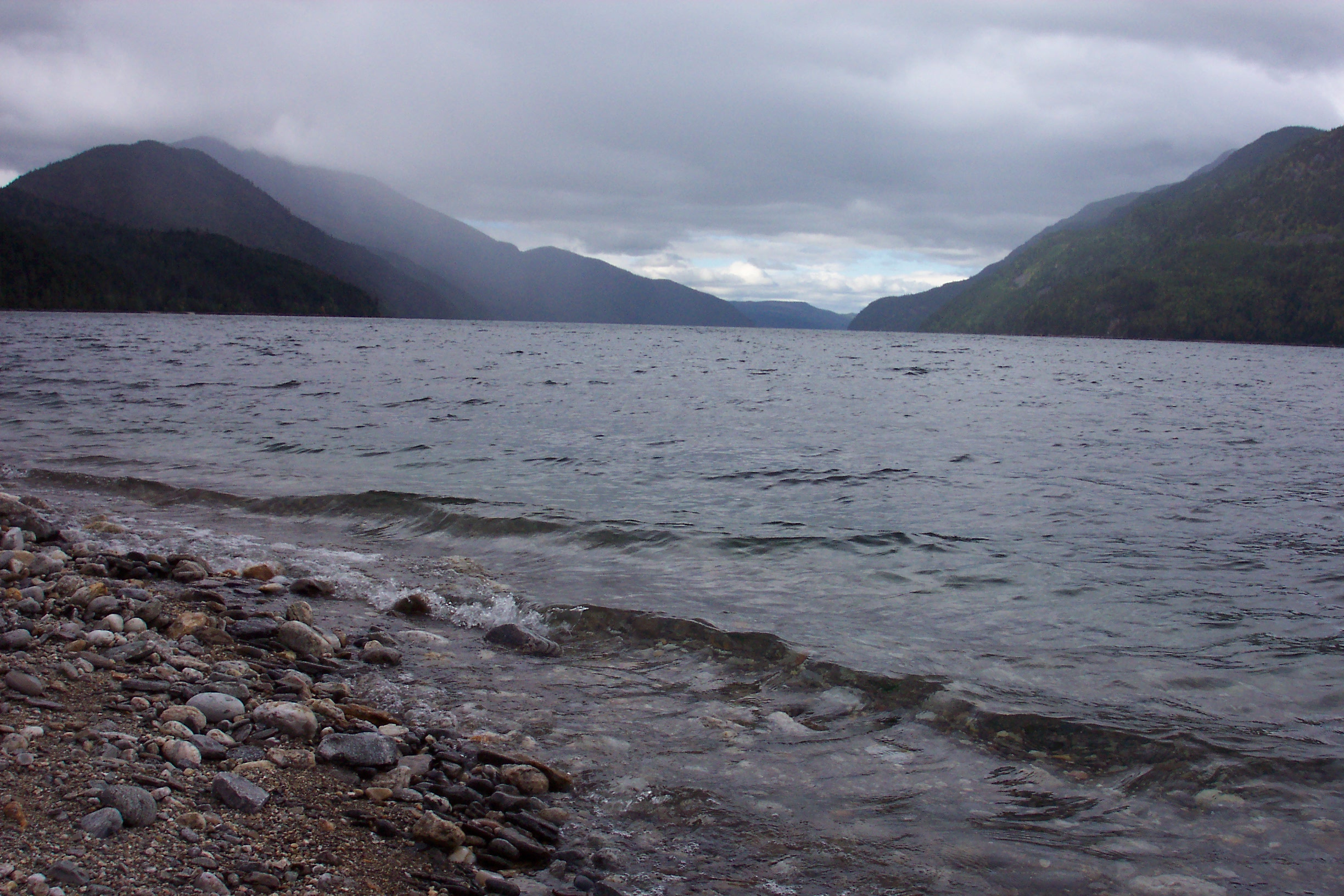
- Quesnel Lake

- Location within British Columbia
- Location: British Columbia, Canada
- Coordinates: 52°32′N 121°2′W
- Lake type: Glacial, fjord lake, oligotrophic
- Primary inflows: Horsefly River; Mitchell River; Niagara Creek
- Primary outflows: Quesnel River (total 131m^{3})
- Catchment area: 6,200 km^{2} (2,400 sq mi)
- Basin countries: Canada
- Max. length: 100 km (62 mi) from Likely to end of East arm, 48 km (30 mi) North Arm
- Surface area: 266 km^{2} (103 sq mi)
- Average depth: 157 m (515 ft)
- Max. depth: 511 m (1,677 ft)
- Water volume: 41.8 km^{3} (10.0 cu mi)
- Residence time: 10.1 years
- Shore length^{1}: 323.8 km (201.2 mi)
- Surface elevation: 728 m (2,388 ft)
- Settlements: Likely, Horsefly
- ^{1} Shore length is not a well-defined measure.

Quesnel Lake /kwɪˈnɛl/ is a glacial lake or fjord in British Columbia, Canada, and is the major tributary of the Fraser River. With a maximum depth of 511 m (1,677 ft), it is claimed to be the deepest fjord lake in the world, the deepest lake in BC, and the third-deepest lake in North America, after Great Slave Lake and Crater Lake. The lake is Canadas deepest non-cryptodepression (the deepest point is well over mean sealevel).

On August 4, 2014, the tailings pond of Mount Polley mine burst, spilling tailings into Polley Lake and Quesnel Lake and temporarily depriving residents of Likely, British Columbia, of fresh water for household use. In 2017, the Mount Polley mine was granted a permit to discharge mine wastewater into Quesnel Lake.

Forestry, mining and fishing are popular in this area. Quesnel Lake is also a trophy lake because live bait or barbed hooks are not allowed. Catch-and-release restrictions apply to Steelhead fish shorter than 10 cm or longer than 50 cm. Rainbow trout, Dolly Varden and other species of lake trouts are common. Quesnel lake offers the ability to fish right from shore and along tributary streams, or to explore the lake by boat, kayak, canoe, or paddleboard during the summer months.

== See also ==
- List of lakes of British Columbia

== Sources ==
- Petticrew, Ellen L.; Albers, Sam J.; Baldwin, Susan A.; Carmack, Eddy C. (5 May 2015). "The impact of a catastrophic mine tailings impoundment spill into one of North America's largest fjord lakes: Quesnel Lake, British Columbia, Canada". Geophysical Research Letters. 42 (9): 3347–3355. doi:10.1002/2015GL063345.
- Potts, Daniel John (August 2004). Quesnel Lake's heat budget (PDF) (Thesis). Archived from the original (PDF) on July 6, 2011.
