= Broadmoor, Richmond =

Broadmoor
- Neighbourhood
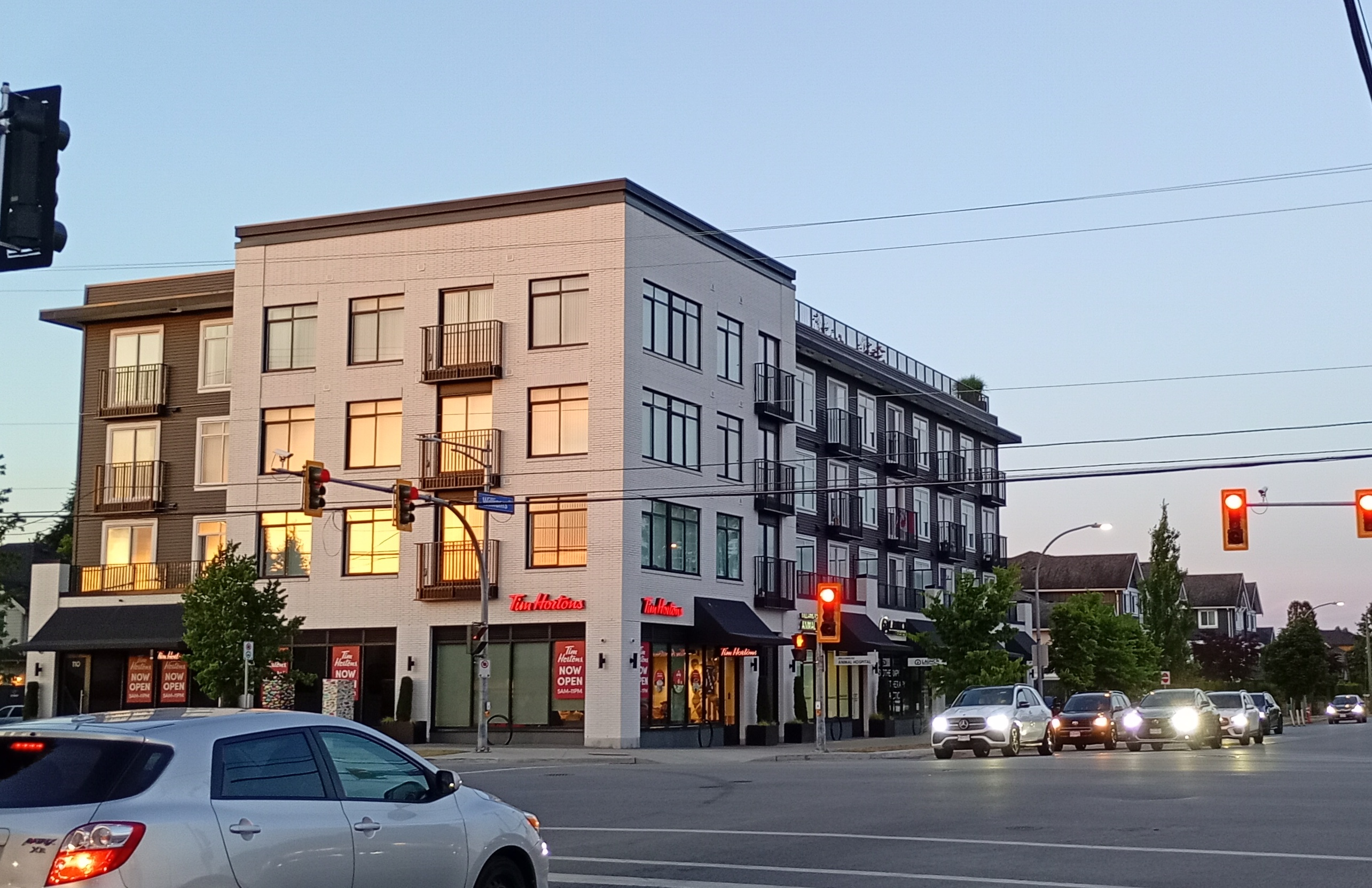
- The intersection of Williams and No. 3 Road

- Location of Broadmoor in Richmond

- Location in Metro Vancouver
- Coordinates: 49.145259°N 123.130451°W
- Country: Canada
- Province: British Columbia
- City: Richmond

Area
  - Total: 6 km^{2} (2.3 sq mi)

Population (2021)
  - Total: 23,050
  - Density: 3,821.17/km^{2} (9,896.8/sq mi)
- Forward sortation area: V6Y, V7A

Broadmoor is a residential neighbourhood located in Richmond, British Columbia. The neighbourhood is bounded by Gilbert Road in the west, Blundell Road in the north, No. 4 Road in the east, and Steveston Highway in the south. It is the third most populous neighbourhood in Richmond after the City Centre and Steveston.

The community is anchored by two primary commercial nodes: Broadmoor Shopping Centre and Richlea Square at the intersection of Williams Road and No. 3 Road, and Garden City Shopping Centre and Blundell Plaza at Blundell Road and Garden City Road along the neighbourhood's shared northern perimeter with the City Centre. The latter hosts an annual summer fair in the plaza, offering live entertainment and community programming.

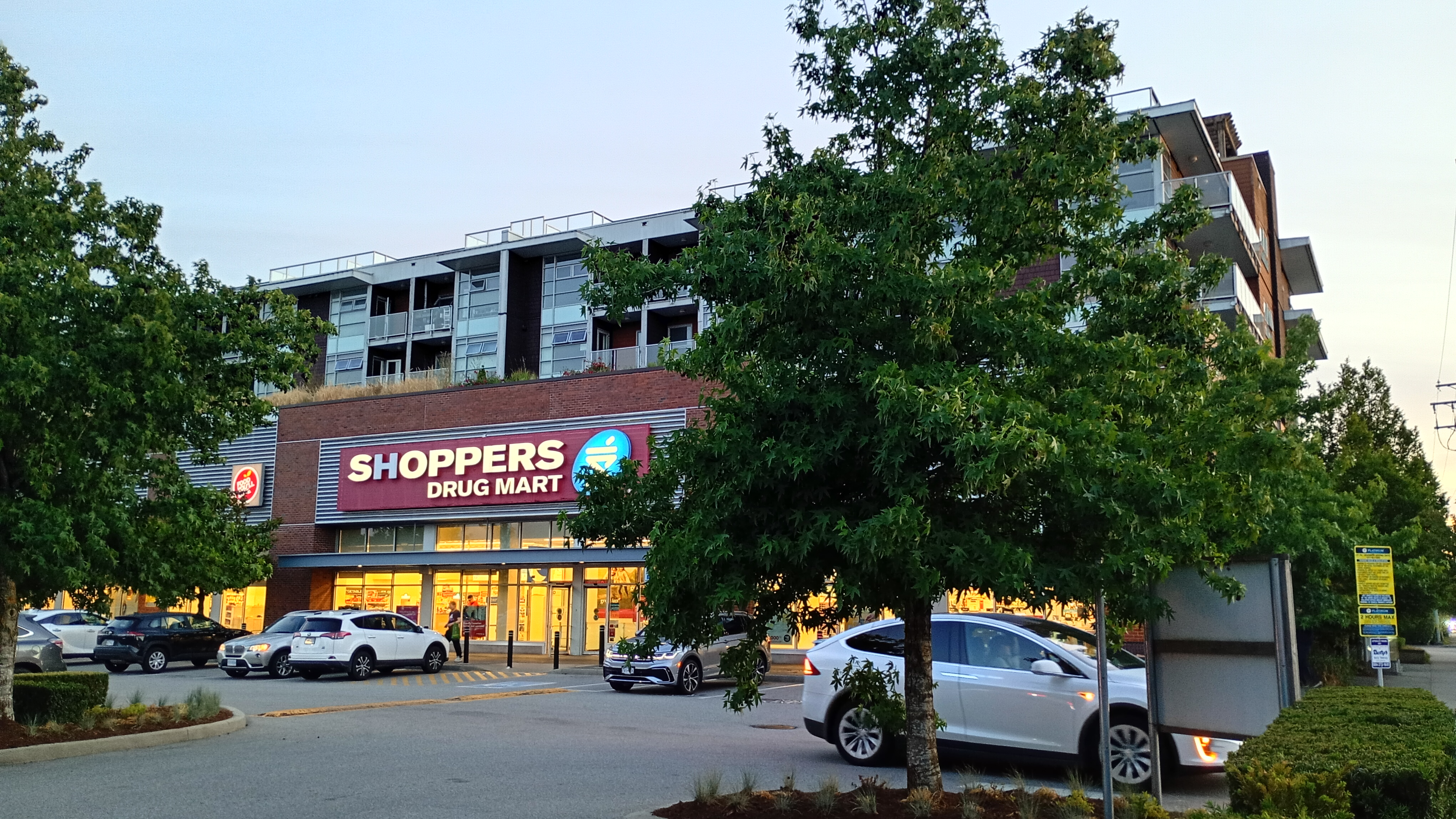
Broadmoor Shopping Centre

== History ==
Prior to mass suburbanization in Richmond, the Broadmoor area consisted primarily of farmland. However, during the 1950s, local farmers began subdividing their land for residential redevelopment, transforming Broadmoor into one of the municipality's first modern subdivisions.

Between 1956 and 1969, the developer Fraser Valley Lands Ltd. spearheaded the development of the Broadmoor subdivision. The Sunnymede subdivision followed shortly after, with its own development spanning from 1959 to 1964.

After decades of suburbanization, Broadmoor has been slowly redeveloping single family lots to densify its residential streets with missing middle housing.

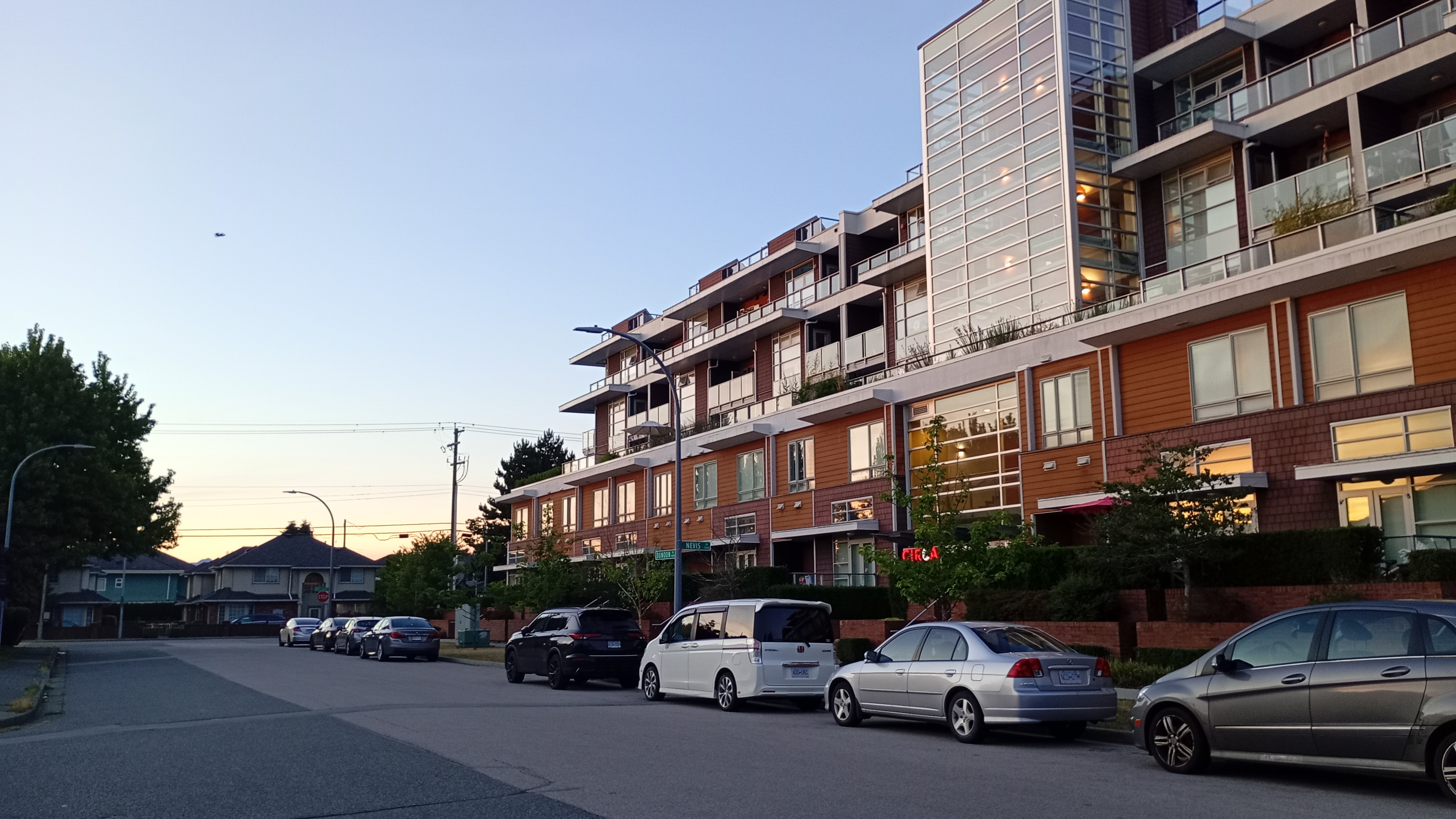
A new apartment building located next to townhomes.

== Demographics ==
The 2021 census found that English was spoken as mother tongue by 43.9% of the population. The next most common mother tongue language was Mandarin, spoken by 21.6% of the population, followed by Cantonese at 15.7%.

Panethnic groups in the Broadmoor neighbourhood (2021)
Panethnic group	2021
Panethnic group	%
East Asian (Note: Statistic includes total responses of "Chinese", "Korean", and "Japanese" under visible minority section on census.)	61.9%
European (Note: Statistic includes all persons that did not make up part of a visible minority or an indigenous identity.)	18.3%
Southeast Asian (Note: Statistic includes total responses of "Filipino" and "Southeast Asian" under visible minority section on census.)	6.6%
South Asian	6.7%
Middle Eastern (Note: Statistic includes total responses of "West Asian" and "Arab" under visible minority section on census.)	1.5%
Latin American	0.9%
African	1%
Other/multiracial (Note: Statistic includes total responses of "Visible minority, n.i.e." and "Multiple visible minorities" under visible minority section on census.)	3.1%
Total population	100%
Note: Totals greater than 100% due to multiple origin responses

== Transportation ==
As a primarily suburban neighbourhood, Broadmoor relies heavily on vehicular travel with 71.9% of residents driving to work and 8.7% commuting as passengers. Public transit serves 12.9% of the population, while active options remain modest, with 3.4% walking and 1.5% cycling to their jobs.

=== Public Transport ===
Translink serves bus routes through Broadmoor, providing the neighbourhood with direct connections to major transit hubs in Richmond, such as the Canada Line. It also provides access to other prominent neighbourhoods in Richmond, such as Steveston, Brighouse, and Ironwood. These bus routes include the 403, 404, 407, 408, and the 413.

=== Cycling ===
Broadmoor features a grid of designated bike routes that accommodate local commuting:

- East/West Connections: The Crosstown, Saunders/Woodwards, and Williams routes, along with the Steveston Highway multi-purpose path.
- North/South Connections: The Parkside, Midtown, and Garden City routes.

== Education ==
The Broadmoor area is home to eight elementary schools:

- William Bridge Elementary School
- Howard DeBeck Elementary School
- John T. Errington Elementary School
- W.D. Ferris Elementary School
- Garden City Elementary School
- Maple Lane Elementary School
- Walter Lee Elementary School
- James Whiteside Elementary School

As well as two secondary schools:

- Hugh McRoberts Secondary School
- R.C. Palmer Secondary School

In addition, the Rideau Park Resource Centre is located in the neighbourhood.

== Parks and Recreation ==
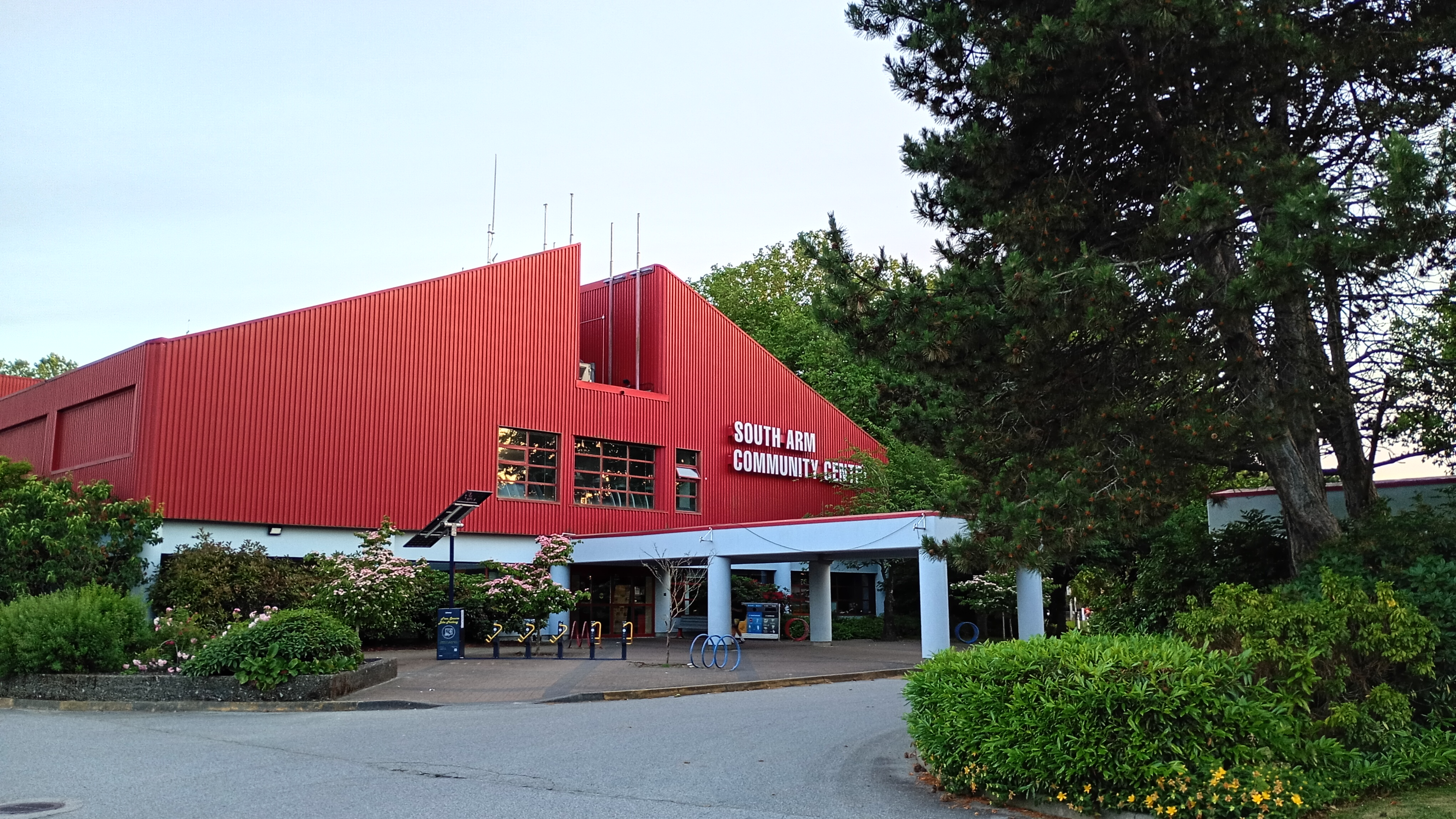
South Arm Community Centre

Broadmoor is served by the South Arm Community Centre, a central hub for local recreation.

The neighbourhood features numerous green spaces, anchored by South Arm Park, the area’s largest park, which includes the South Arm Pool as well as several athletic fields and courts.

In addition to joint-use school grounds, Broadmoor is lined with smaller neighbourhood parks, including Marrington, Heather Dolphin, and Rideau neighbourhood parks.
