= Richmond School District =

School district in British Columbia, Canada

School District 38 Richmond

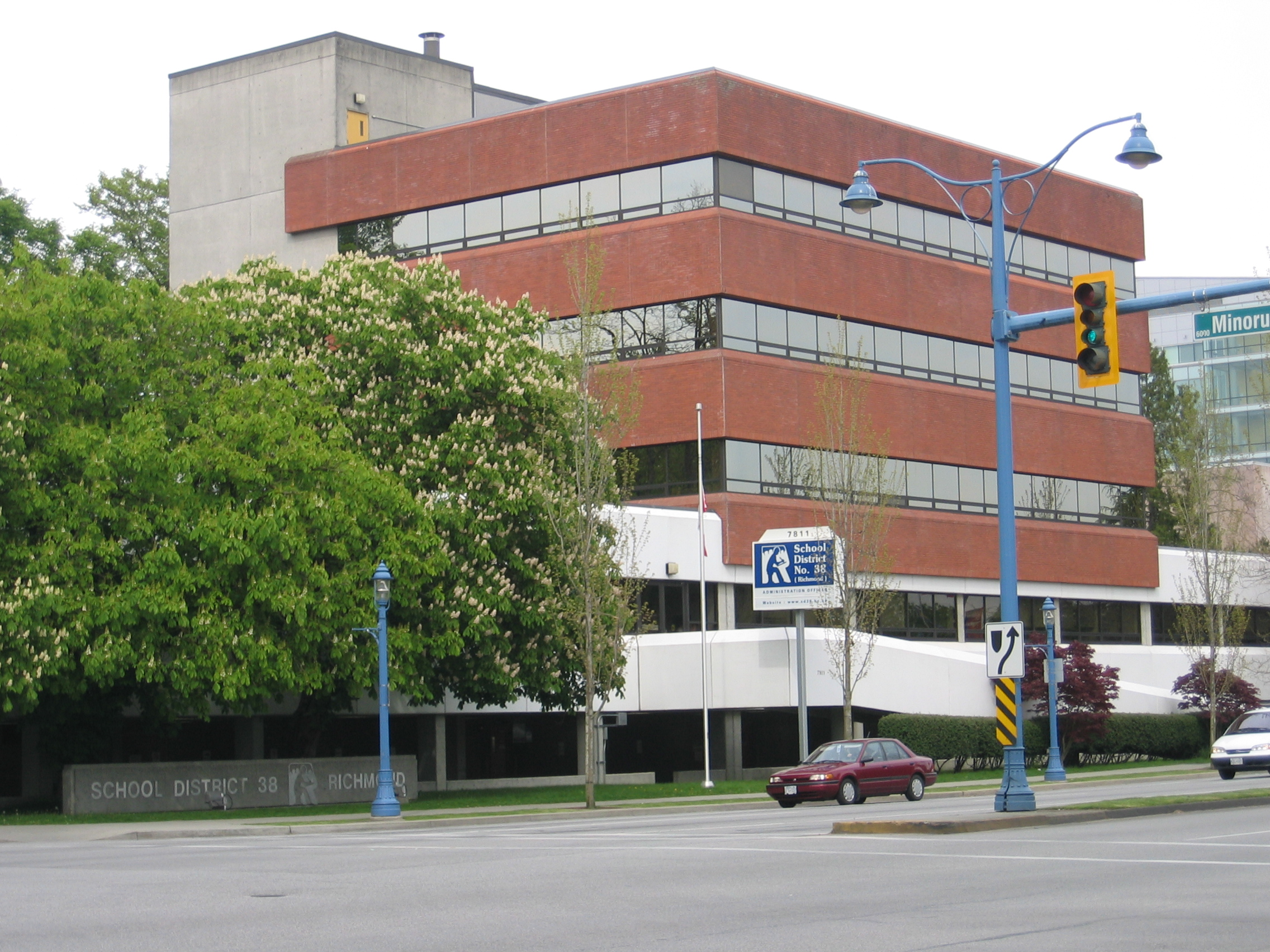
- Headquarters for the Richmond School District

Location
- Richmond Lower Mainland Canada

District information
- Motto: Our focus is on the learner
- Superintendent: Chris Usih
- Schools: 53
- Budget: CA$344 million (2023–2024)

Students and staff
- Students: 23,107 (2023–2024)

Other information
- Website: www.sd38.bc.ca

Richmond School District, officially the Board of Education of School District No. 38 (Richmond), also known as SD38, is a school district based in Richmond, British Columbia, Canada. The school board is governed by seven elected trustees and serves the entire city of Richmond.

The district supports a hands-on approach to learning, which emphasizes students' actual skills, rather than grades and standardized test performance.

== Schools ==
As of 2016, the district operates 38 primary schools, 10 secondary schools, and one alternative school.

=== Elementary schools ===
Current Elementary Schools:
Name	Location	Grades	Notes
Anderson Elementary School	Brighouse	k–7	Early French Immersion Offered
Blair Elementary School	Thompson	k–7	
Blundell Elementary School	Blundell	k–7	
Bridge Elementary School	Broadmoor	k–7	Early French Immersion Offered
Brighouse Elementary School	Brighouse	k–7	Montessori education offered
Byng Elementary School	Steveston	k–7	
Cook Elementary School	Brighouse	k–7	
City Centre Elementary School	Golden Village	k–7	
DeBeck Elementary School	Broadmoor	k–7	
Diefenbaker Elementary School	Steveston	k–7	Late French Immersion Offered
Dixon Elementary School	Seafair	k–7	Early French Immersion Offered
Errington Elementary School	Broadmoor	k–7	
Ferris Elementary School	Broadmoor	k–7	
Garden City Elementary School	Broadmoor	k–7	Montessori education offered
General Currie Elementary School	Broadmoor	k–7	
Gilmore Elementary School	Seafair	k–7	Early French Immersion Offered
Grauer Elementary School	Seafair	k–7	
Hamilton Elementary School	Hamilton	k–7	
Homma Elementary School	Steveston	k–7	Early French Immersion Offered
Kingswood Elementary School	Shellmont	k–7	
Kidd Elementary School	Shellmont	k–7	
Lee Elementary School	Broadmoor	k–7	
Maple Lane Elementary School	Broadmoor	k–7	
McKay Elementary School	Blundell	k–7	
McKinney Elementary School	Steveston	k–7	Montessori education offered
McNeely Elementary School	East Cambie	k–7	
Mitchell Elementary School	East Cambie	k–7	Early French Immersion Offered
Quilchena Elementary School	Thompson	k–7	
Spul'u'kwuks Elementary School	Thompson	k–7	
Steves Elementary School	Steveston	k–7	Montessori education offered
Tait Elementary School	Bridgeport	k–7	
Talmey Elementary School	Bridgeport	k–7	
Thompson Elementary School	Thompson	k–7	
Tomsett Elementary School	West Cambie	k–7	
Westwind Elementary School	Steveston	k–7	
Whiteside Elementary School	Shellmont	k–7	Both Early and Late French Immersion Offered
Woodward Elementary School	Shellmont	k–7	
Wowk Elementary School	Blundell	k–7	

=== Secondary schools ===
Prior to 1996, Richmond had separate Junior Secondary Schools (grades 8–10) and Senior Secondary Schools (grades 11–12). Starting in 1996, the district began a two-year merging process that changed all high schools to be Grades 8 to 12 inclusive.

Current Secondary Schools:
Name	Location	Grades	Notes
Burnett Secondary School	Thompson	8–12	
Cambie Secondary School	East Cambie	8–12	
Hugh Boyd Secondary School	Seafair	8–12	
MacNeill Secondary School	Brighouse	8–12	
McMath Secondary School	Steveston	8–12	French Immersion offered
McNair Secondary School	Shellmont	8–12	
McRoberts Secondary School	Broadmoor	8–12	French Immersion offered
Palmer Secondary School	Broadmoor	8–12	
Richmond Secondary School	Brighouse	8–12	International Baccalaureate offered
Steveston-London Secondary School	Blundell	8–12	

=== Alternate schools ===
Alternate Schools:
Name	Location	Notes
Richmond Virtual School	Online	
Station Stretch	Minoru	

=== Defunct Schools ===
Name	Location	Grades Upon Closure	Year closed	Notes
Sea Island Annex	Sea Island	K–3	2019	Closed due to decreasing amount of students.
Steveston Secondary School	Steveston	8–12	2007	Aging infrastructure of building.
Sidaway Elementary School	East Richmond	K-7	2005	Closed due to decreasing amount of students.
Alexander Kilgour Elementary School	Blundell	K-7	2003	Declining enrolment and provincial financial restraints. Currently houses the Ecole Des Navigateurs By Conseil scolaire francophone de la Colombie-Britannique.
Rideau Park Elementary School	Broadmoor	K-7	2003	Declining Enrolment and financial restraints. The building is now used as a resource education centre.
B.W. Garratt Elementary School	Blundell	K-7	2003	Declining enrolment and financial restraints.
Austin Harris Elementary School	Steveston	Unknown	1991	Closed due to decreasing amount of students.
Eburne Elementary School	City Centre	Unknown	1982	Opened as an annex to Bridgeport School. Closed due to decreasing amount of students. Reopening in 2026 as City Centre Elementary School.
Bridgeport School	Bridgeport	Unknown	1980	First Richmond school to offer secondary classes. Absorbed by Richmond High School.
Garden City Annex	Broadmoor	Unknown	1953	Lack of enrolment and replaced by DeBeck Elementary in 1966.

== Board of Education ==
The Richmond Board of Education consists of seven school trustees. They are elected along with the mayor and councillors of Richmond in municipal elections.

=== 2022–present ===
Elected in the 2022 municipal election

- Rob Belleza
- Ken Hamaguchi
- Heather Larson
- Donna Sargent
- Debbie Tablotney
- Alice Wong
- David Yang

=== 2018–2022 ===
Elected in the 2018 municipal election

- Norm Goldstein
- Ken Hamaguchi
- Heather Larson
- Richard Lee
- Sandra Nixon
- Donna Sargent
- Debbie Tablotney

=== 2014–2018 ===
Elected in the 2014 municipal election

- Ken Hamaguchi
- Jonathan Ho
- Sandra Nixon
- Donna Sargent
- Debbie Tablotney
- Alice Wong
- Eric Yung
