= Brighouse (disambiguation) =

Brighouse is a town in West Yorkshire, England. It may also refer to:

== Associated with the English town ==
- Brighouse High School
- Brighouse railway station
- Brighouse Town FC

== People ==
- Harold Brighouse (1882-1958), English playwright and author
- Harry Brighouse, British political philosopher at the University of Wisconsin-Madison
- James Brighouse, 19th-century American leader of a splinter sect of the Latter Day Saint movement
- Tim Brighouse (born 1940), British educator and former Schools Commissioner for London

== Other uses ==
- Brighouse, Richmond, Canada, a neighbourhood
- Richmond–Brighouse station, a rapid transit station in Richmond, British Columbia, Canada
- Samuel Brighouse Elementary, a school in Richmond, British Columbia, Canada

== See also ==
- Brighouse and Spenborough (UK Parliament constituency), a former British parliamentary constituency
