= Blundell, Richmond =

Blundell
- Neighbourhood
- Location of Blundell in Richmond

- Location in Metro Vancouver
- Coordinates: 49.155576°N 123.158953°W
- Country: Canada
- Province: British Columbia
- City: Richmond

Area
  - Total: 4.53 km^{2} (1.75 sq mi)

Population (2021)
  - Total: 18,065
  - Density: 3,988/km^{2} (10,330/sq mi)
- Forward sortation area: V7C, V7E

Blundell is a residential neighbourhood located in Richmond, British Columbia. The neighbourhood is bounded by Railway Avenue in the west, Granville Avenue in the north, Gilbert Road in the east, and Williams Road and Steveston Highway in the south. It is the fourth most populous neighbourhood in Richmond.

The community is anchored by Blundell Centre at the intersection of Blundell Road and No. 2 Road. This commercial node provides the surrounding residential blocks with grocery options, medical services, financial institutions, and local dining amenities.

== History ==
The area was named after Blundell Station, a stop on the Vancouver-Steveston interurban line historically located at Blundell Road and Railway Avenue, connecting the neighbourhood to Steveston, Vancouver, and the rest of Richmond from 1902 until 1958. The station was named after T. Blundell-Brown, an employee of the BC Electric Railway.

During the 1920s, the Blundell neighbourhood was divided into large agricultural plots with homes facing the main thoroughfares. This farming identity was later transformed by the Fraser Valley Lands company through two housing projects during an era of rapid suburban growth: the Udy subdivision to the north in 1955, and the Twin Cedars development to the south between 1958 and 1968.

== Demographics ==
The 2021 census found that English was spoken as mother tongue by 40.2% of the population. The next most common mother tongue language was Mandarin, spoken by 23.2% of the population, followed by Cantonese at 20.1%.

Panethnic groups in the Blundell neighbourhood (2021)
| Panethnic group | 2021 |
| Panethnic group | % |
|---|---|
| East Asian (Note: Statistic includes total responses of "Chinese", "Korean", and "Japanese" under visible minority section on census.) | 67.9% |
| European (Note: Statistic includes all persons that did not make up part of a visible minority or an indigenous identity.) | 16.5% |
| Southeast Asian (Note: Statistic includes total responses of "Filipino" and "Southeast Asian" under visible minority section on census.) | 4.9% |
| South Asian | 4.0% |
| Middle Eastern (Note: Statistic includes total responses of "West Asian" and "Arab" under visible minority section on census.) | 1.7% |
| Latin American | 0.6% |
| African | 1% |
| Other/multiracial (Note: Statistic includes total responses of "Visible minority, n.i.e." and "Multiple visible minorities" under visible minority section on census.) | 3.3% |
| Total population | 100% |
Note: Totals greater than 100% due to multiple origin responses

== Transportation ==
As a primarily suburban neighbourhood, Blundell relies heavily on vehicular travel with 74.1% of residents driving to work and 9.8% commuting as passengers. Public transit serves 11.2% of the population, while active options remain modest, with 1.8% walking and 1.0% cycling to their jobs.

=== Public Transport ===
Translink serves bus routes through Blundell, providing the neighbourhood with direct connections to major transit hubs in Richmond, such as the Canada Line. It also provides access to other prominent commercial hubs in the city, such as Steveston, Brighouse, and Ironwood. These bus routes include the 402, 406, 407, and the 413.

=== Cycling ===
Blundell features a grid of designated bike routes that accommodate local commuting:

- East/West Connections: The Crosstown, Saunders/Woodwards, Williams, Granville routes, along with the Steveston Highway multi-purpose path.
- North/South Connections: The Railway Greenway, and No 2. Road.

== Education ==
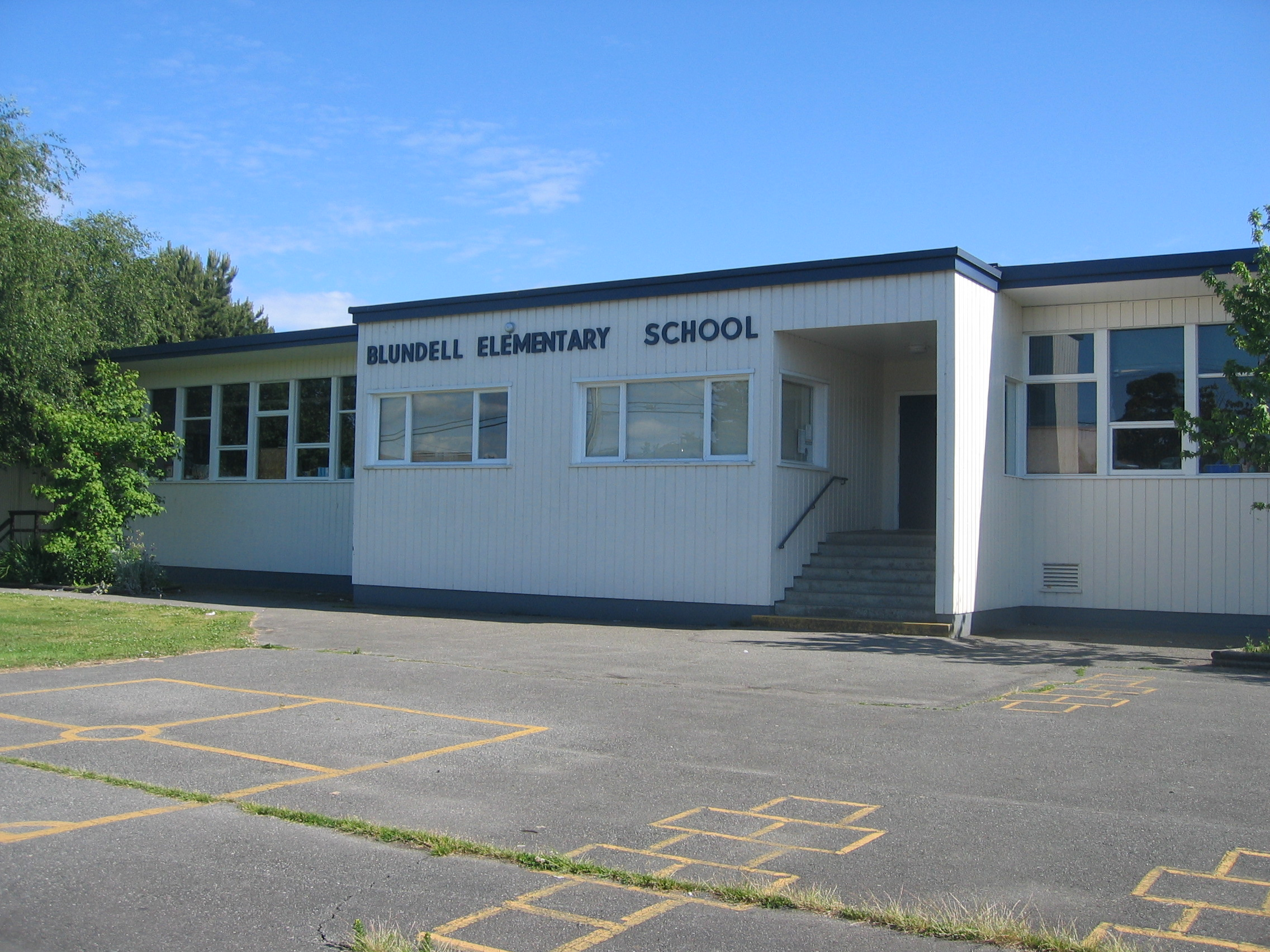
Blundell Elementary

The Blundell area is home to three public elementary schools:

- Blundell Elementary School
- Donald McKay Elementary School
- Jessie Wowk Elementary School

As well as one secondary school:

- Steveston-London Secondary School

In addition, the Richmond Christian School operates their elementary campus in the neighbourhood. The Conseil scolaire francophone de la Colombie-Britannique, operates one Francophone primary school in the area: école des Navigateurs.

== Parks and Recreation ==
The community is anchored by both Blundell Neighbourhood Park and London/Steveston Neighbourhood School Park, which supply the local area with a variety of sports fields and athletic courts. Beyond these shared school grounds, Blundell is also woven together by smaller local parks, such as the Garratt and Park Lane neighbourhood parks.
