= Richmond City Centre, British Columbia =

Richmond City Centre
- City centre
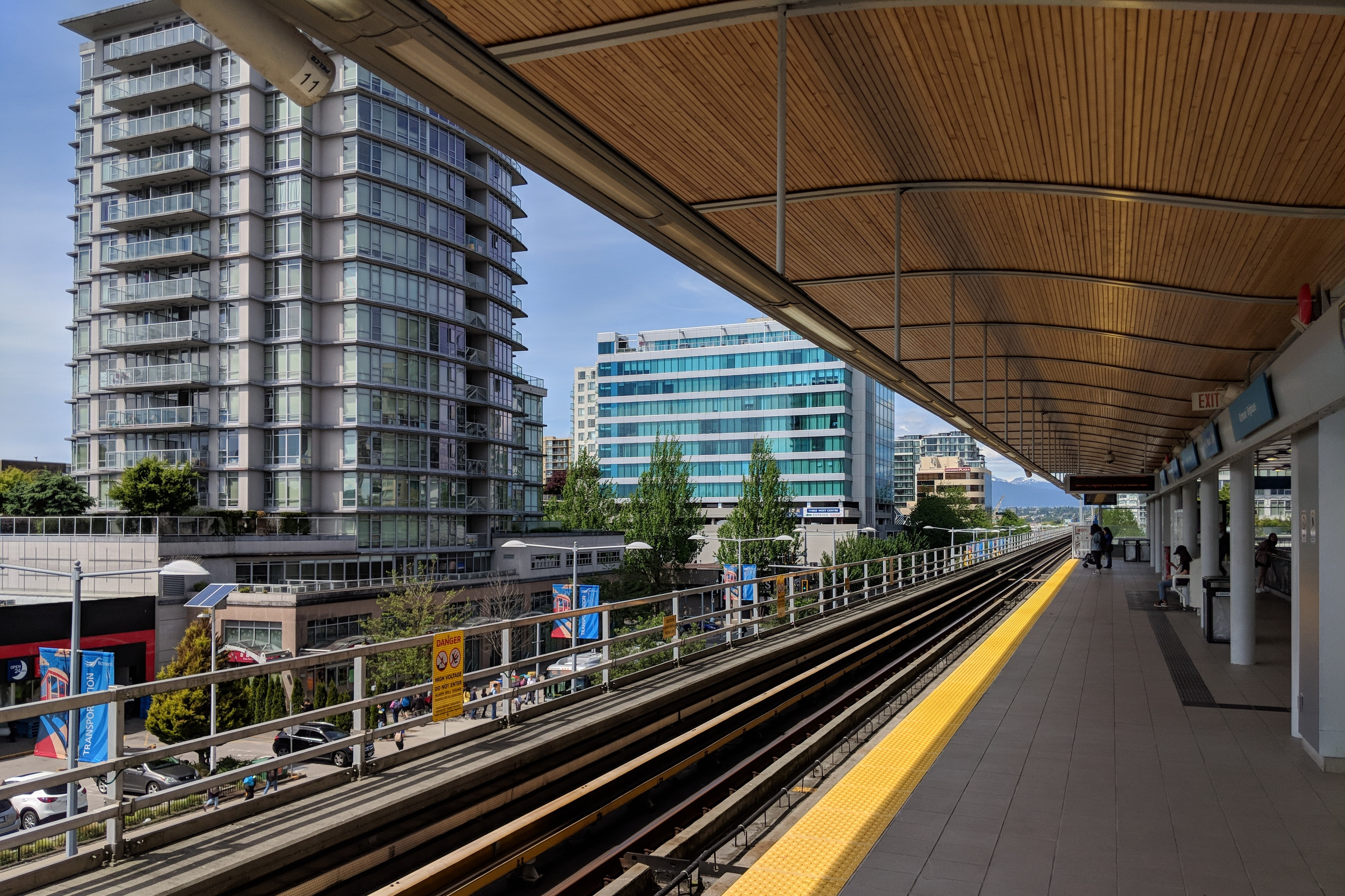
- Richmond City Centre

- Location of City Centre in Richmond

- Location in Metro Vancouver
- Coordinates: 49.170226°N 123.136521°W
- Country: Canada
- Province: British Columbia
- City: Richmond

Area
  - Total: 930 ha (2,300 acres)

Population (2021)
  - Total: 62,855
  - Density: 6,715/km^{2} (17,390/sq mi)
- Forward sortation area: V6X, V6Y, V7C

Richmond City Centre is the central business district of Richmond, British Columbia. The city centre comprises seven areas: Brighouse Village, Oval Village, Lansdowne Village, Aberdeen Village, Capstan Village, Bridgeport Village, and Southeast.

It is the most populous area of Richmond.

== Areas ==
=== Brighouse Village ===
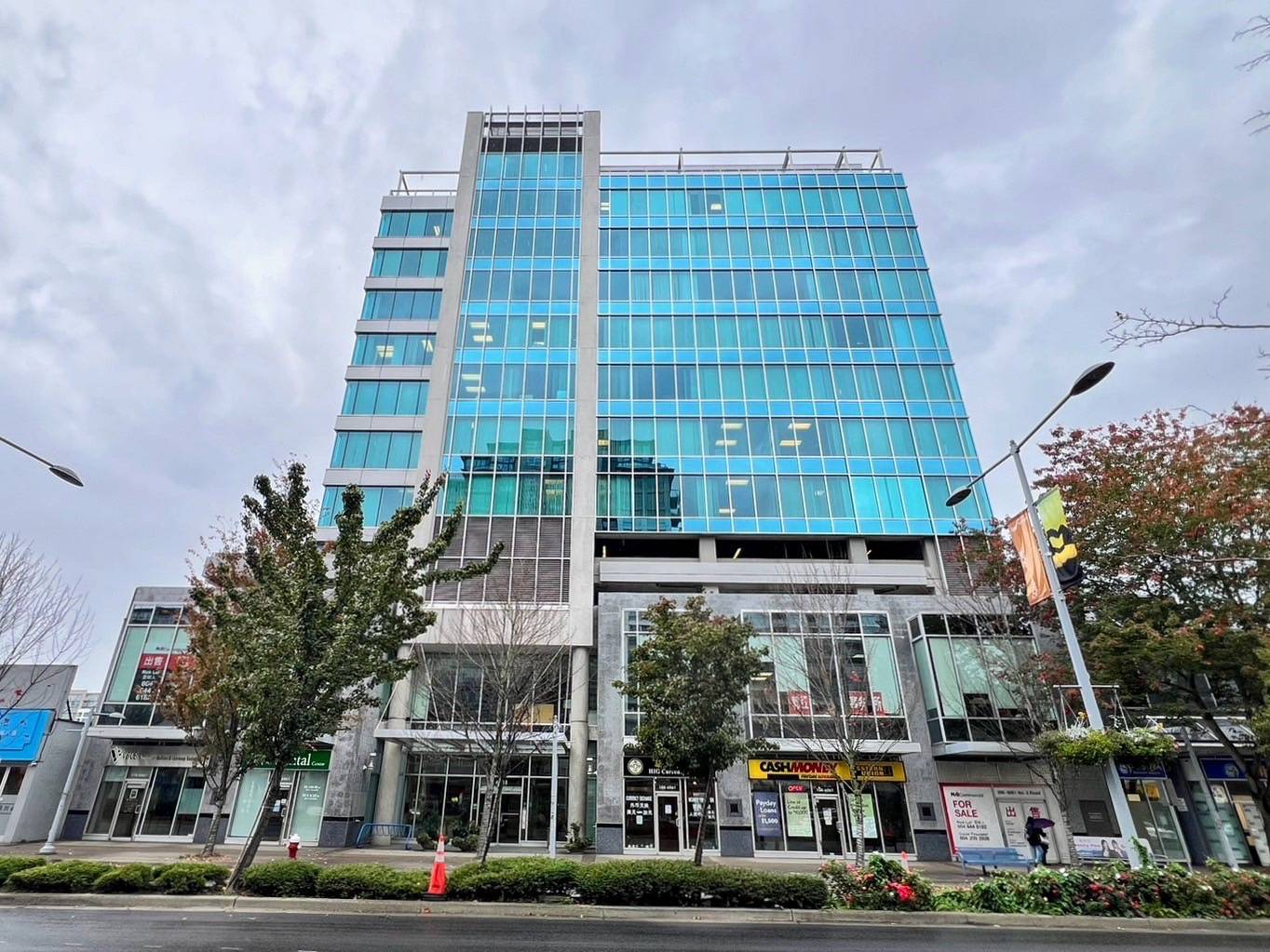
The Three West Centre office complex in Brighouse

Brighouse Village is the downtown and civic core of Richmond. It is anchored by Richmond City Hall, Minoru Park, the main branch of the Richmond Public Library, Richmond Centre, Richmond Hospital, and Richmond–Brighouse station. While shops line the street, office buildings and condos are found radiating from the station. Further east, townhomes and low-rise apartments can be found on tree-lined streets.

=== Oval Village ===
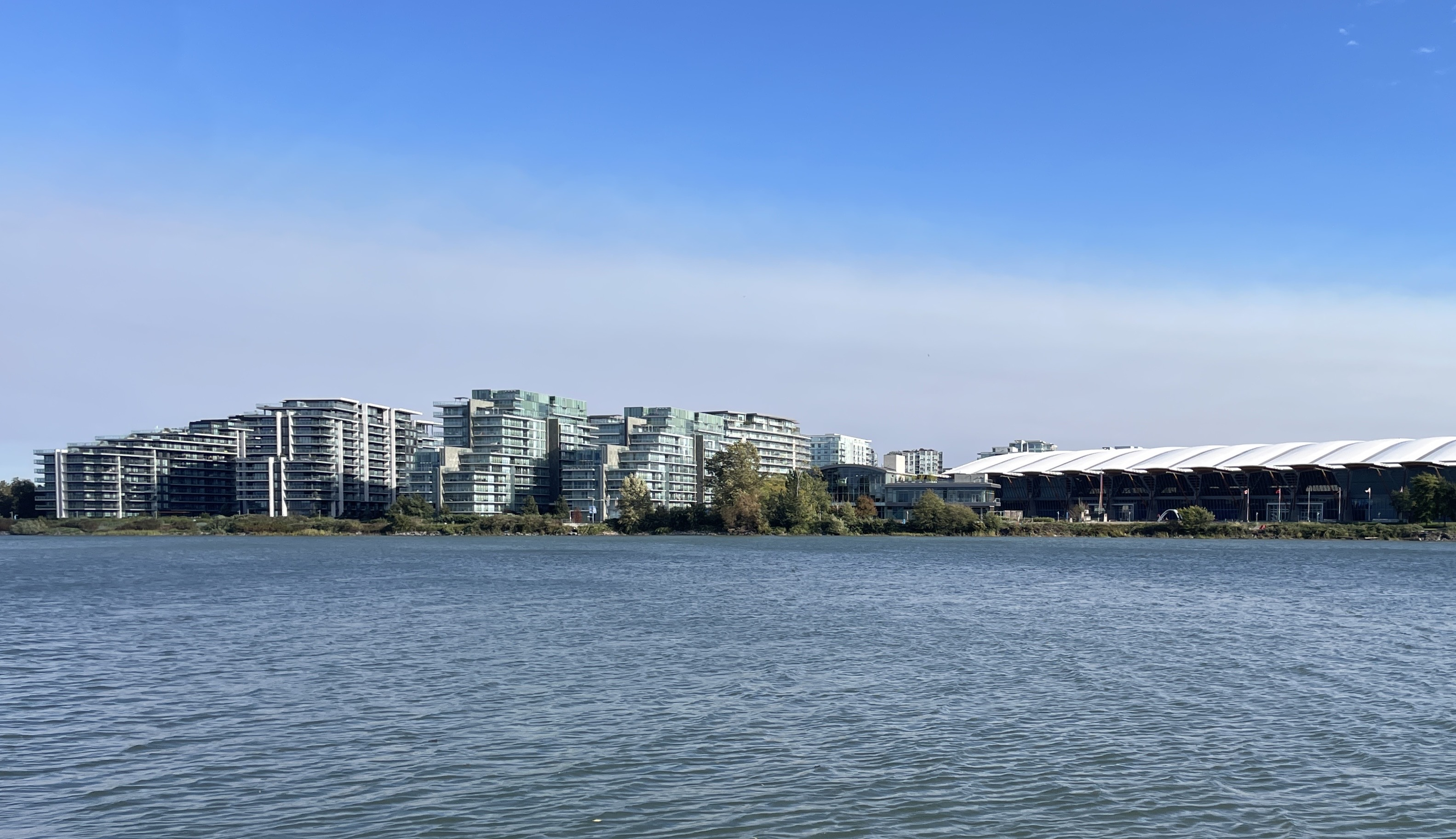
The Oval Village as seen from Sea Island

The Oval Village is anchored by the Richmond Olympic Oval and the Richmond Curling Centre. Following the 2010 Winter Olympics, the former light-industrial area was progressively redeveloped into a high-density, mixed-use community comprising commercial space, offices, and residential condominiums, with the Richmond Olympic Oval serving as the primary catalyst for the area's urban transformation.

=== Lansdowne Village ===
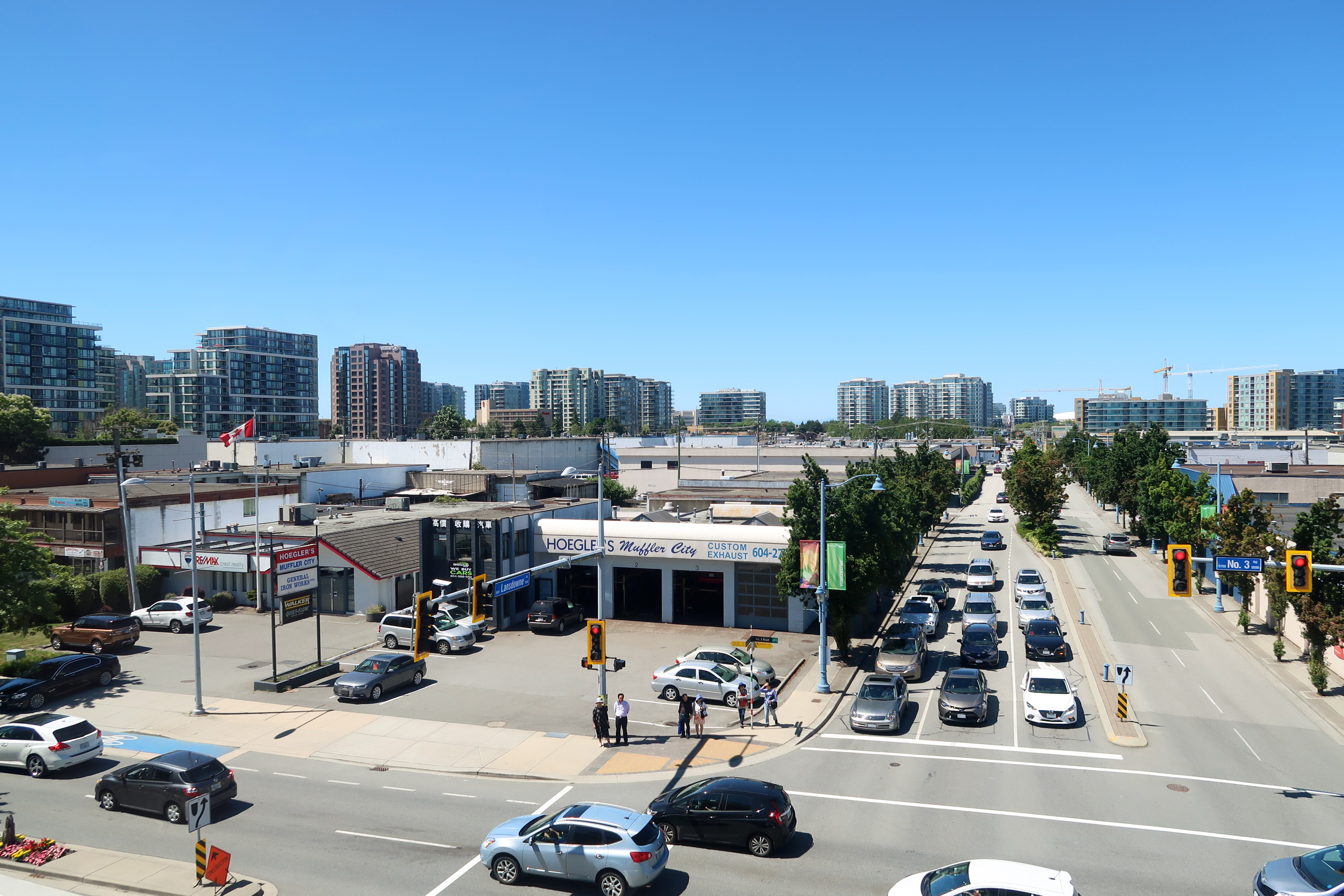
The west side of Lansdowne Village as seen from Lansdowne Station

Located immediately north of the city's downtown core, Lansdowne Village is anchored by the Lansdowne Centre shopping complex and Lansdowne station on the Canada Line SkyTrain. During the 1920s, the neighborhood was primarily occupied by Lansdowne Park, a prominent regional horse racing track. In 1977, Lansdowne Centre was constructed on the former racetrack site, establishing itself as Richmond's second-largest shopping mall.

The area is slated for a redevelopment that will progressively replace the low-rise mall and its surrounding surface parking lots to a high-density, mixed-use community centred around street-facing retail, office towers, residential condominiums, and a large public park.

=== Aberdeen Village ===
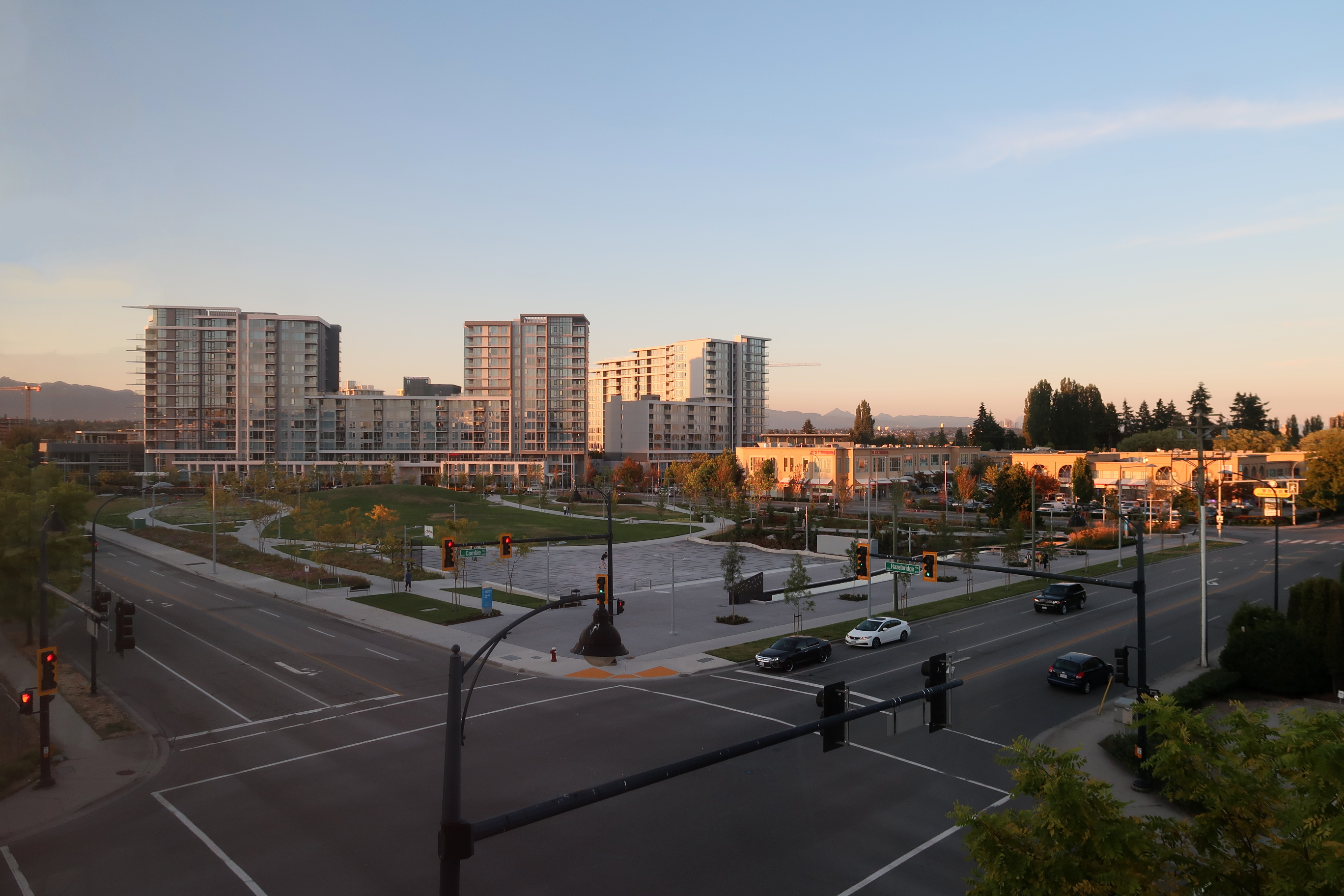
Aberdeen Neighbourhood Park

Aberdeen Village is the primary commercial and cultural centre for Richmond's East Asian community. The neighbourhood is anchored by Aberdeen Centre, British Columbia’s largest Asian-focused shopping mall, as well as Aberdeen Station, Parker Place, President Plaza, Empire Centre, and Alexandra Road, known as Food Street to locals due to its large concentration of Asian eateries.

=== Capstan Village ===
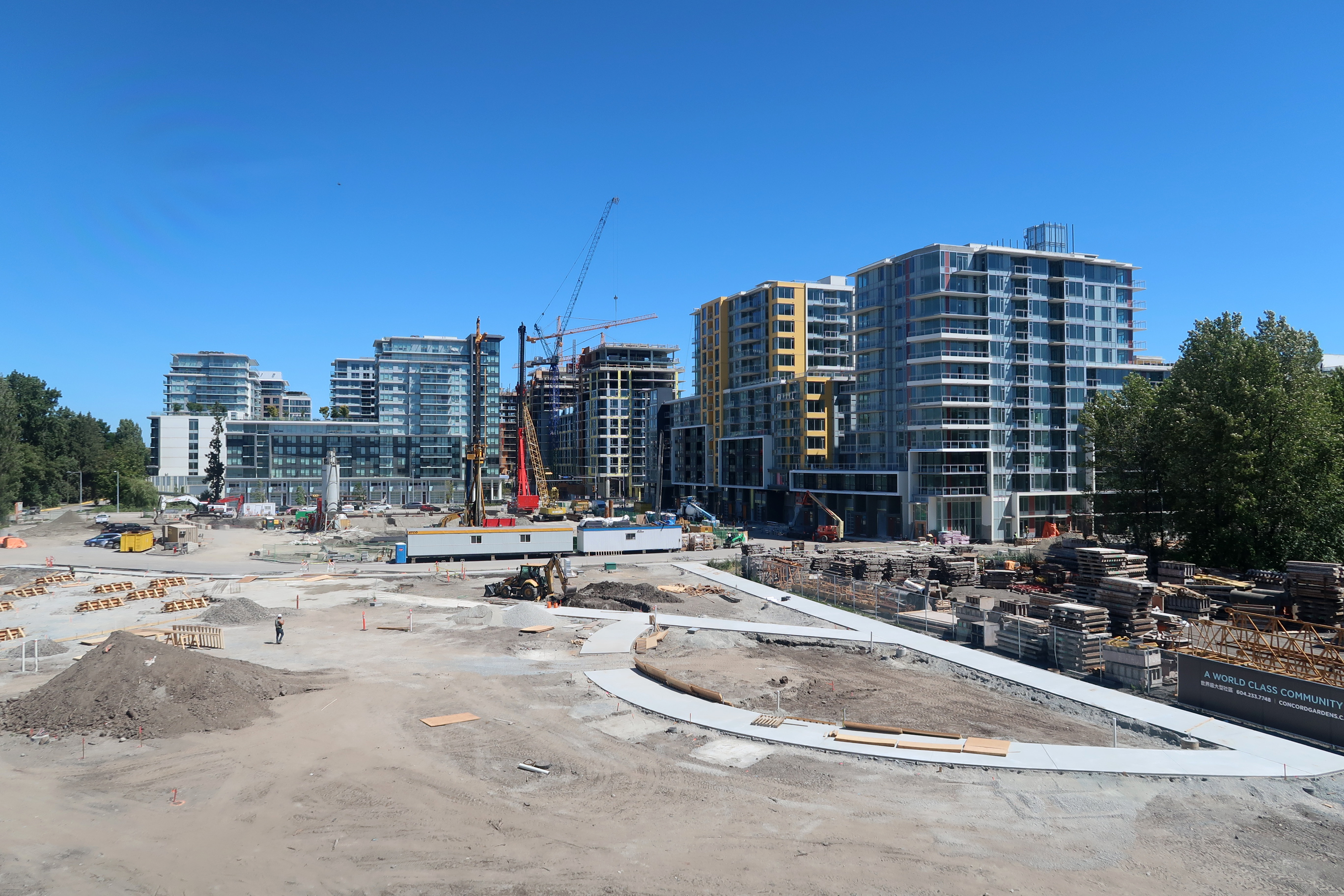
Capstan Village under construction in 2018

Capstan Village is a rapidly-evolving, high-density residential neighbourhood positioned between Bridgeport and Aberdeen villages. The neighbourhood is anchored by the newly opened Capstan station on the Canada Line SkyTrain. Driven by massive master-planned multi-tower developments, the area is transitioning into a highly walkable urban community projected to house over 16,000 residents. The neighbourhood's urban landscape features modern mid-rise condominium clusters around public plazas, parks, and ground-floor retail corridors.

As part of the Golden Village commercial district, the neighbourhood features several Asian-oriented retail hubs, including Yaohan Centre, Continental Shopping Centre, and Union Square Shopping Centre. The latter has earned the moniker "Diabetes Plaza" among local Chinese community, due to its high concentration of bubble tea chains and dessert cafes.

=== Bridgeport Village ===
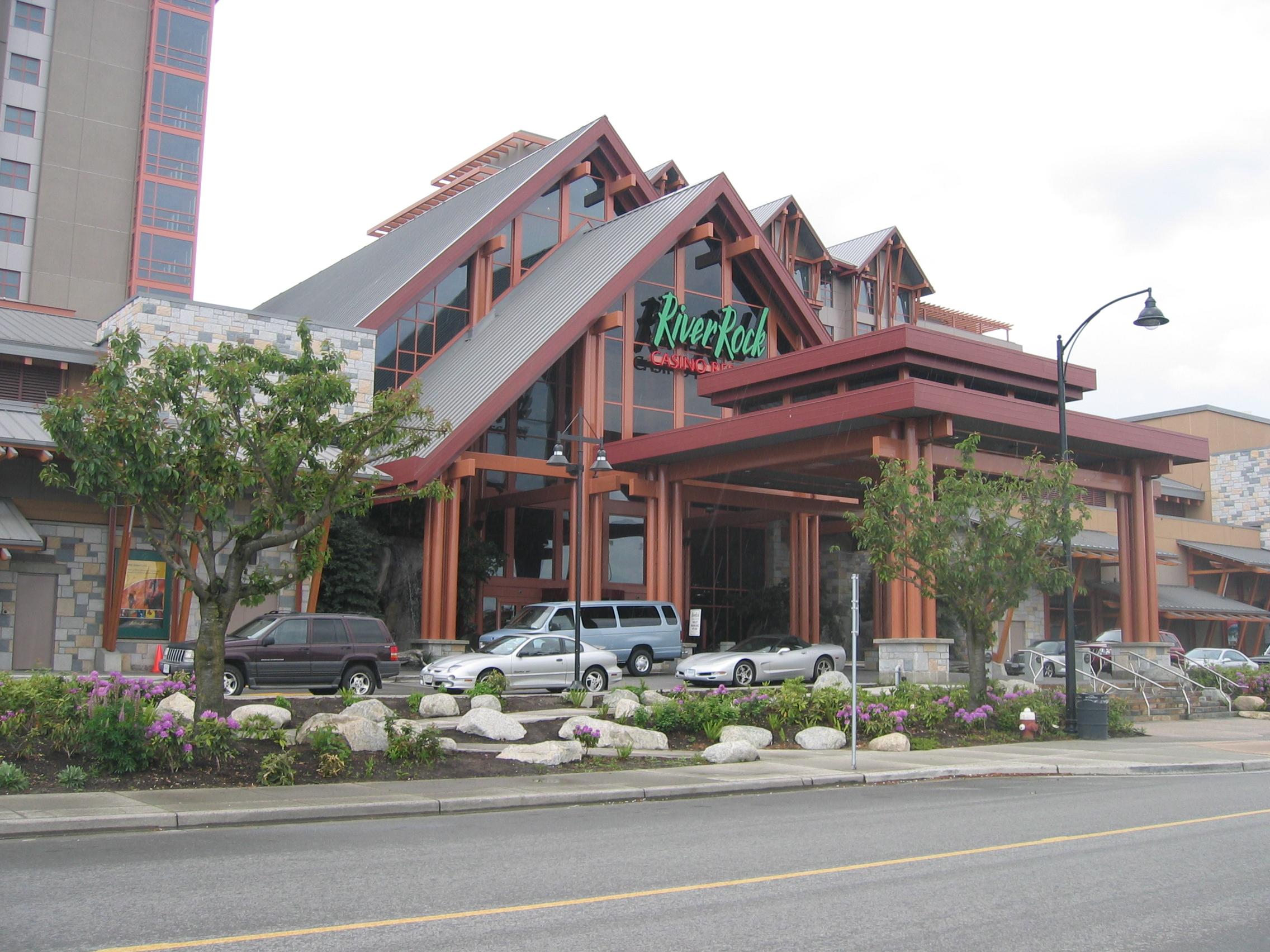
River Rock Casino

Bridgeport Village is a commercial and industrial neighbourhood in Richmond's City Centre, located across the river from the Vancouver International Airport and the city of Vancouver. It serves as a major regional entertainment and transit hub, anchored by the River Rock Casino Resort, the seasonal Richmond Night Market, and Bridgeport Station. The area’s built form consists of hotels, retail warehouses, and commercial offices rather than residential housing. Residential development is prohibited in the neighbourhood.

The area was once one of Richmond's early institutional centers. In 1906, Bridgeport School was opened at the corner of Bridgeport and Sexsmith Roads, built to accommodate the influx of families settling near the river crossings.

=== Southeast ===
The Southeast is a primarily residential neighbourhood located immediately south of Brighouse. The neighbourhood comprises these subareas: Moffatt, St. Albans, McLennan North, and McLennan South.

The Southeast is characterized by the high density of low-rise apartments alongside townhomes, acting as a transition from the City Centre to the municipality's suburban neighbourhoods.

== Demographics ==
The 2021 census found that English was most spoken at home by 36.1% of the population. The next most common mother tongue language was Mandarin, spoken by 23.7% of the population, followed by Cantonese at 20.5%.

Panethnic groups in Richmond City Centre (2021)
Panethnic group	2021
Panethnic group	%
East Asian (Note: Statistic includes total responses of "Chinese", "Korean", and "Japanese" under visible minority section on census.)	67.4%
European (Note: Statistic includes all persons that did not make up part of a visible minority or an indigenous identity.)	12.2%
Southeast Asian (Note: Statistic includes total responses of "Filipino" and "Southeast Asian" under visible minority section on census.)	9.7%
South Asian	3.3%
Middle Eastern (Note: Statistic includes total responses of "West Asian" and "Arab" under visible minority section on census.)	2%
Latin American	1.3%
African	0.8%
Other/multiracial (Note: Statistic includes total responses of "Visible minority, n.i.e." and "Multiple visible minorities" under visible minority section on census.)	3.4%
Total population	100%
Note: Totals greater than 100% due to multiple origin responses

== Transportation ==
As Richmond's most urban area, city centre residents have the least amount of vehicular travel in the municipality, with 62.2% of residents driving to work and 7.7% commuting as passengers. Public transit serves 18.4% of the population, while 9.1% walk and 1.1% cycle to their jobs.

=== Public transport ===
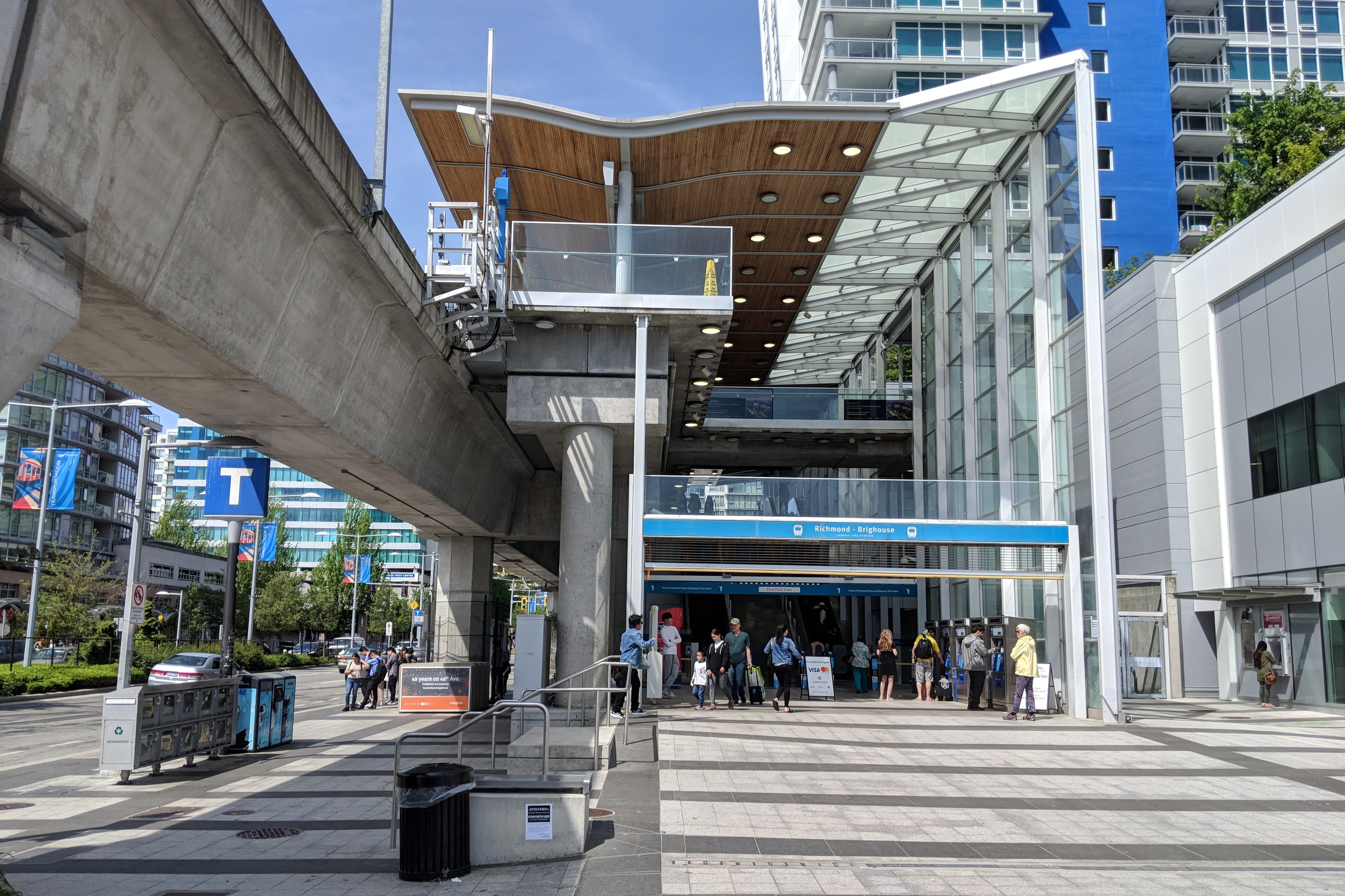
Richmond-Brighouse Station

Richmond City Centre is anchored by the Canada Line, which provides the city with a metro connection to Vancouver. Five of the city's eight stations are located within the city centre: Richmond-Brighouse, Lansdowne, Aberdeen, Capstan, and Bridgeport.

Richmond-Brighouse and Bridgeport station is a hub for local bus service to surrounding neighbourhoods and regional bus connections to and from Vancouver, Burnaby, New Westminster, Delta and Surrey.

=== Cycling ===
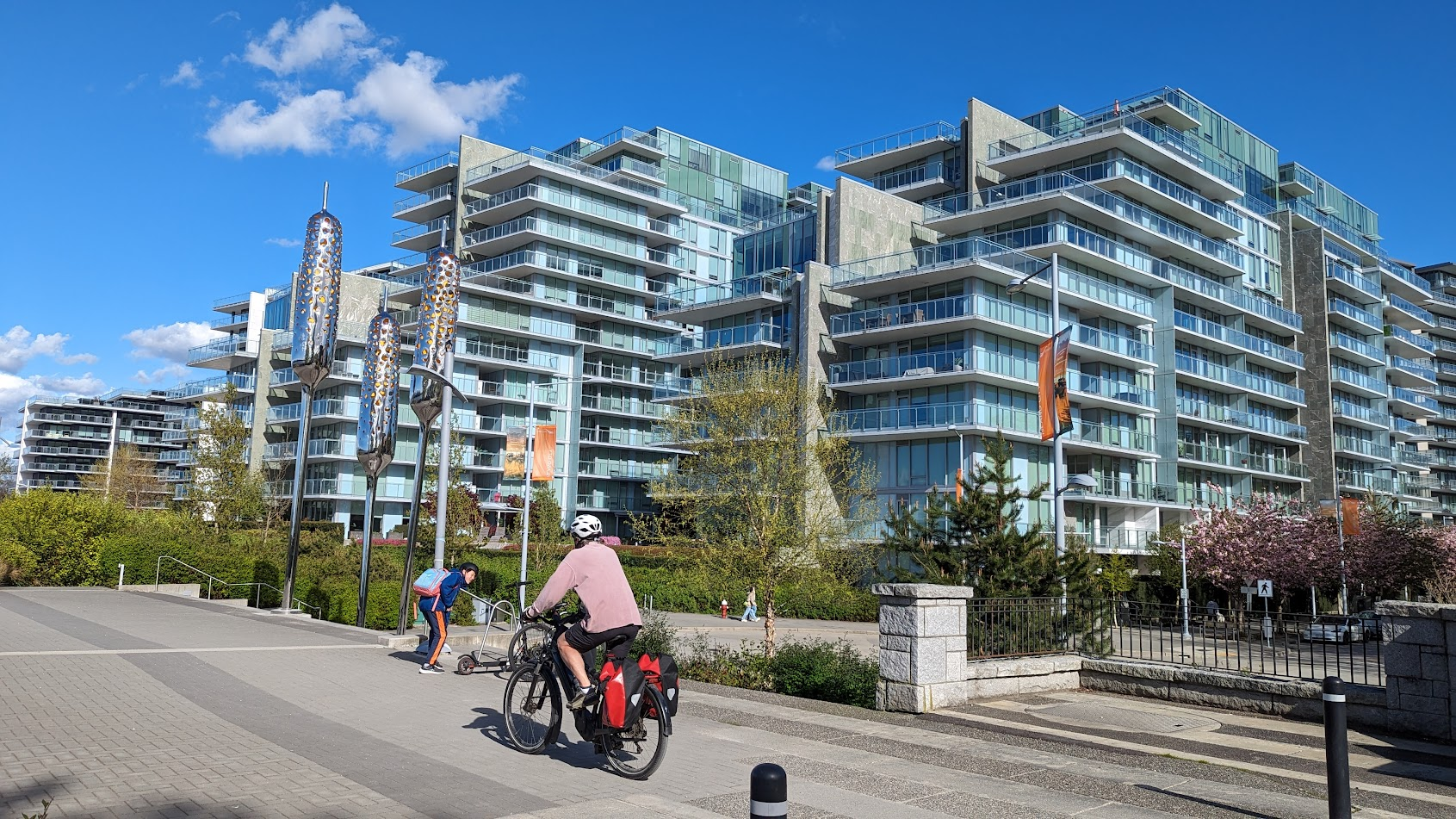
Middle Arm Waterfront Greenway

The city centre features a grid of designated bike routes that accommodate local commuting:

- East/west connections: Granville, Lansdowne, Odlin, Capstan, Sea Island Way
- North/south connections: Middle Arm Waterfront Greenway, Gilbert, River Parkway, Minoru, Sexsmith, and Garden City

== Education ==
The city centre is served by the Richmond School District, headquartered in the area. Richmond's city centre is home to five elementary schools:

- Samuel Brighouse Elementary School
- William Cook Elementary School
- General Currie Elementary School
- City Centre Elementary School
- Henry Anderson Elementary School

There are two secondary schools:

- Richmond Secondary School
- A.R. MacNeill Secondary School

=== Post-secondary ===
Kwantlen Polytechnic University and Trinity Western University each have a campus located in the city centre.

== Parks and recreation ==
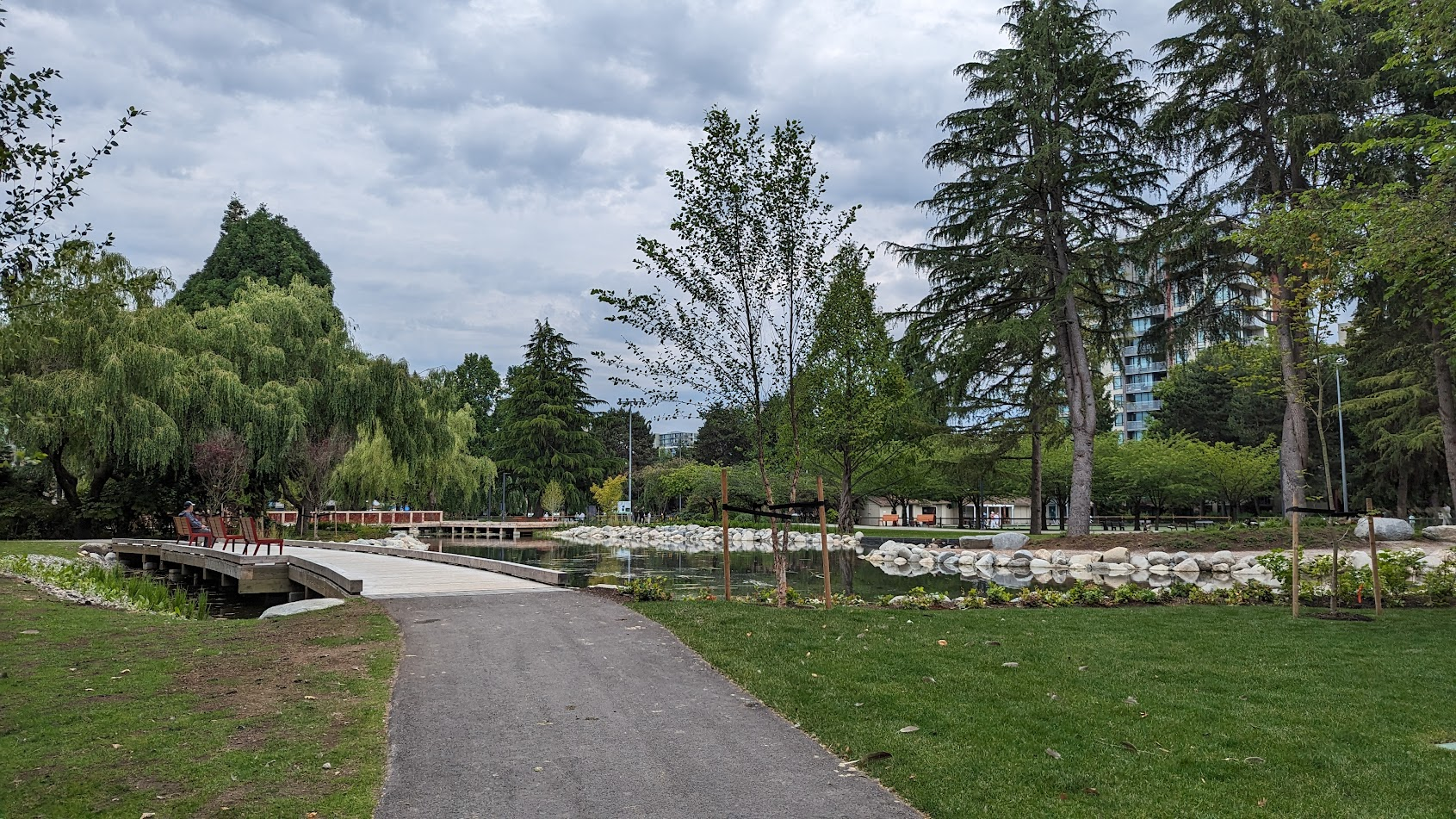
The Minoru Park Lakes District

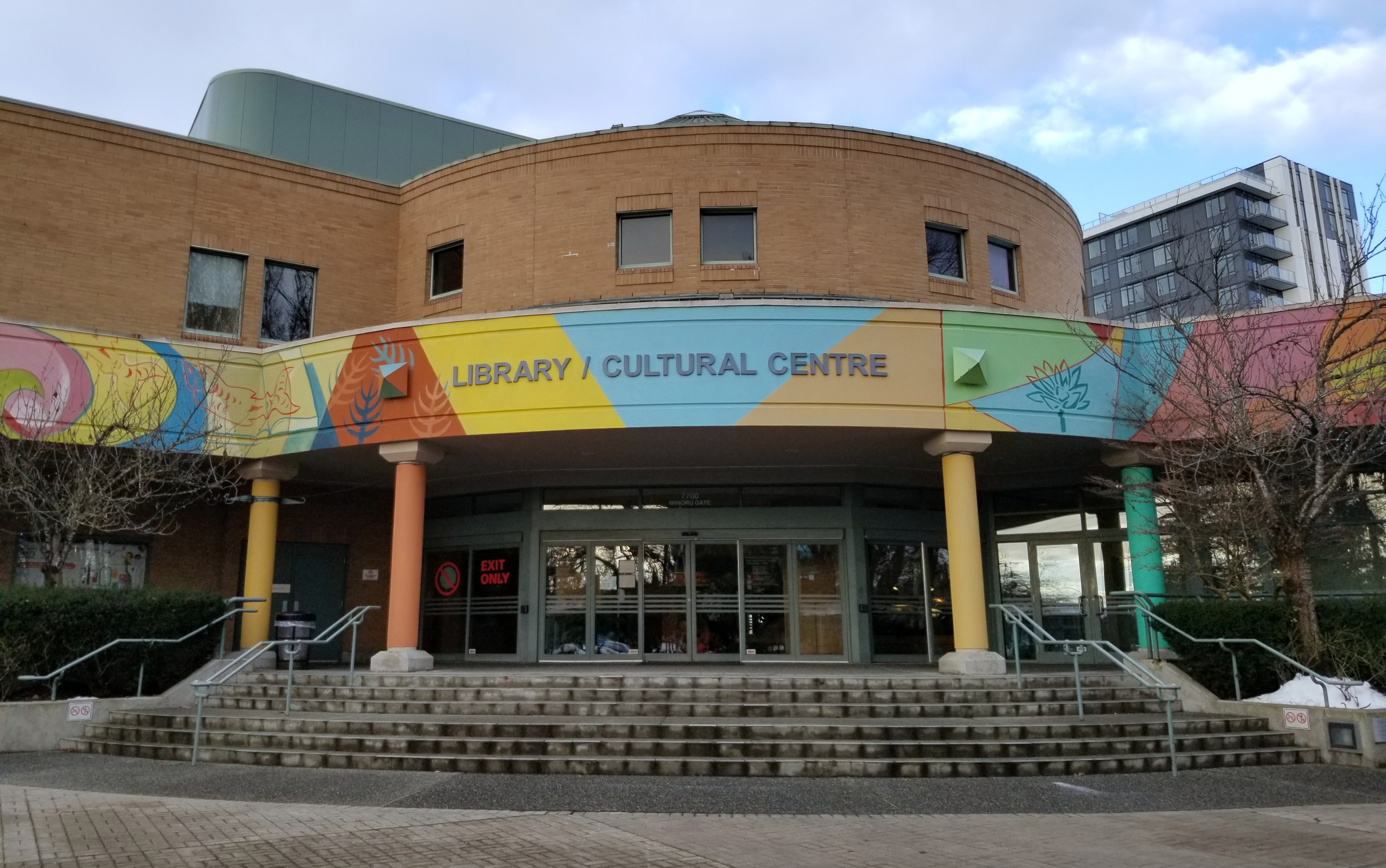
Richmond Cultural Centre and Library

Minoru Park serves as the primary civic and recreational hub of the City Centre, housing the Clement Track, the only competitive running track in the city, alongside the Minoru Arenas, the Minoru Centre for Active Living, the Minoru Seniors Centre, and the Richmond Cultural Centre and Library. The city has designated the Middle Arm Waterfront Greenway, Garden City Community Park, and the Garden City Lands as "signature parks" within its parks system. Popular neighbourhood parks nested within dense, urban commercial areas include Aberdeen, Lang, and Capstan parks.

The City Centre Community Centre, a block northeast of Minoru Park, provides multi-level recreational and community programming. An additional community centre is currently under construction in Capstan Village, slated to open by late 2028.
