= McRoberts Secondary School =

Coordinates: 49°8′25″N 123°7′34.05″W

Hugh McRoberts Secondary School École Secondaire Hugh McRoberts Secondary School
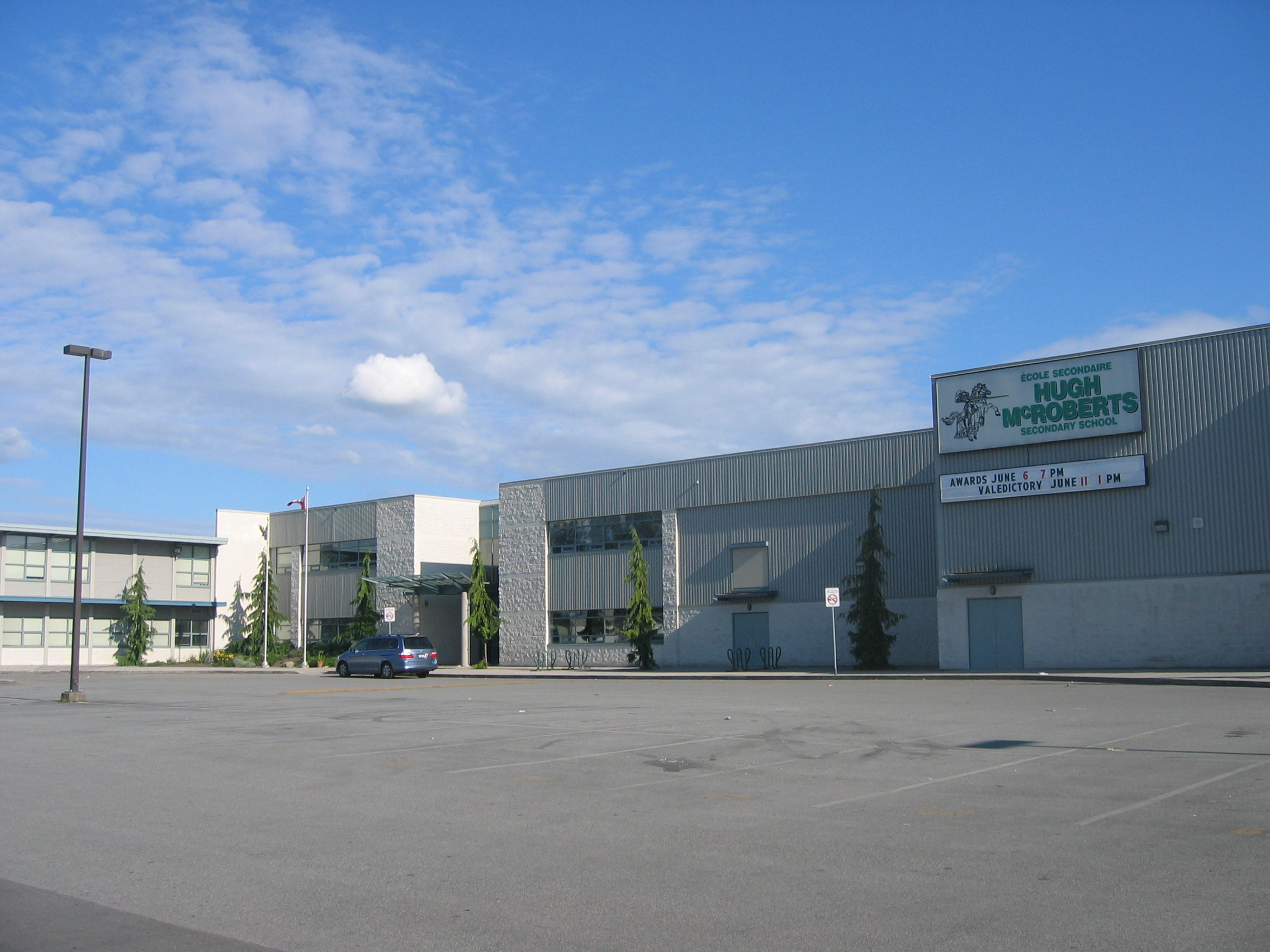
- McRoberts in 2006

Location
- 8980 Williams Road; Richmond, British Columbia, V7A 1G6; Canada

Information
- School type: High School
- Motto: Learning Together... Achieving Our Dreams
- Founded: November 30, 1962
- School board: School District 38 Richmond
- Superintendent: Scott Robinson
- Area trustee: Richard Lee
- School number: 821311
- Principal: Jason Leslie
- Grades: 8–12
- Enrollment: 1040 (2025/2026)
- Language: English, French
- Area: South Arm
- Colour: Green/White/Black
- Mascot: Striker
- Team name: Strikers
- Website: Hugh McRoberts Secondary School
- Last updated: October 3, 2026

Hugh McRoberts Secondary School, officially École Secondaire Hugh McRoberts Secondary School, is a Canadian public school in Richmond, British Columbia and is a part of School District 38 Richmond. It is one of the two schools in Richmond that offer the French Immersion Secondary School program (the other being McMath). McRoberts is situated at Garden City Road and Williams Road. The school logo and mascot is a "Striker", which is depicted as a mounted knight carrying a lance or a claymore. The logo had previously been a shamrock.

Being a dual-track school, McRoberts is the English catchment school for regular programme students from Bridge, Lee (west of Garden City Road), and Whiteside Elementaries and the French catchment for French Immersion students from Anderson, Bridge, Mitchell, and Whiteside Elementaries.

In 2006, the Fraser Institute evaluated Hugh McRoberts Secondary as the highest ranking school compared to other secondary schools in Richmond, with an average ranking of 8.3 out of 10.0 for all schools in the Greater Vancouver Regional District.

== History ==
This school was named after Hugh McRoberts (1815–1883), one of the first European settlers on Sea Island (formerly referred to as McRoberts' Island). McRoberts was born in Ireland and moved to Australia before he moved to Canada. In 1862, McRoberts purchased 1,600 acres of land on Sea Island and named his farm "Richmond," after his wife's birthplace in England.

Hugh McRoberts Junior Secondary School opened on November 30, 1962, and served grades 8 and 10 only, providing a continuous education for students finishing grade 7 from Whiteside, Kidd, and Woodwind Elementaries. In 1996, Richmond's junior and senior secondaries were amalgamated, and every secondary school began serving students of grades 8 through 12. McRoberts began housing its French Immersion programme the same year. The high school was partially renovated in 1999.

== Sports and athletics ==
Former Canadian International Gary Hirayama is one of the coaches of both the junior and senior rugby teams. The team plays its games on the adjoining South Arm Park Field.

=== Fall ===
- Cross-Country
- Girls' Volleyball
- Boys' Soccer
- Junior/Senior Boys' Volleyball
- Grade 8/9 Boys' Rugby
- Swimming

=== Winter ===
- Girls' Basketball
- Boys' Basketball
- Table Tennis

=== Spring ===
- Tennis
- Ultimate Frisbee
- Track & Field
- Badminton
- Grade 8/9 Boys' Volleyball
- Girls' Soccer
- Junior/Senior Boy's Rugby
- Girls' Rugby
- Golf

The senior girls' field hockey ('97, '06) and soccer teams ('07) have both won provincial championships since the school became a Senior High. The senior girls' rugby team has won the school's only provincial championship in 2008.

The Co-Ed Ultimate Frisbee team won back-to-back Tier 2 BCJUC Provincials in 2010 and 2011. In the 2016 spring season, the team was placed in the C Division of Spring Reign Tournament held in Burlington, WA and won. They soon became Richmond School City League Champions for the first time by beating the powerhouse team Richmond High 11-10. This granted them a spot in Tier 1 BCJUC Provincials. McRoberts finished first in their pool. They made it to the finals after defeating Sutherland in the semi-finals on universe point. They won against Stratford Hall in the finals. This was the first time a Richmond High School making it to Tier 1 BCJUC finals and also winning the title.

In the 2019–20 campaign, the Senior Girls Volleyball team won its inaugural South Fraser Championship, replacing the Vancouver and District Championship. The Senior Boys soccer team also won its South Fraser Championship, advancing to provincials.

The school's teams compete in the Richmond League at a district level and either the Vancouver & District or South Fraser league at the regional level. The school competes at a variety of size-levels depending on the sport.

== Notable alumni ==
- Arjan Bhullar, Pro MMA Fighter, Olympic Wrestler (Grad 2004)
- Marshall "Shoma" Cai, prominent Teamfight Tactics streamer (Grad 2020)
- Jonathan Gallivan, musician/producer and guitarist for Moist (band)
- Glenn Gawdin, professional ice hockey player
- Nathan Hirayama, Member, Canadian National Sevens Rugby Team (Grad 2006)
- Carolyn Jarvis, Global News Anchor (Grad 1997)
- Brian Johns, Olympic Swimmer (Grad 2000)
- Darcy Marquardt, Olympic rower (Grad 1997), 2012 Olympic Silver medal
- Coco Rocha, Fashion Model (Grad 2006)
- Vincent Tong, Actor (Grad 1998)
- Cole Walliser, Canadian filmmaker and music video director (Grad 1999)
