= McMath Secondary School =

Robert Alexander McMath Secondary
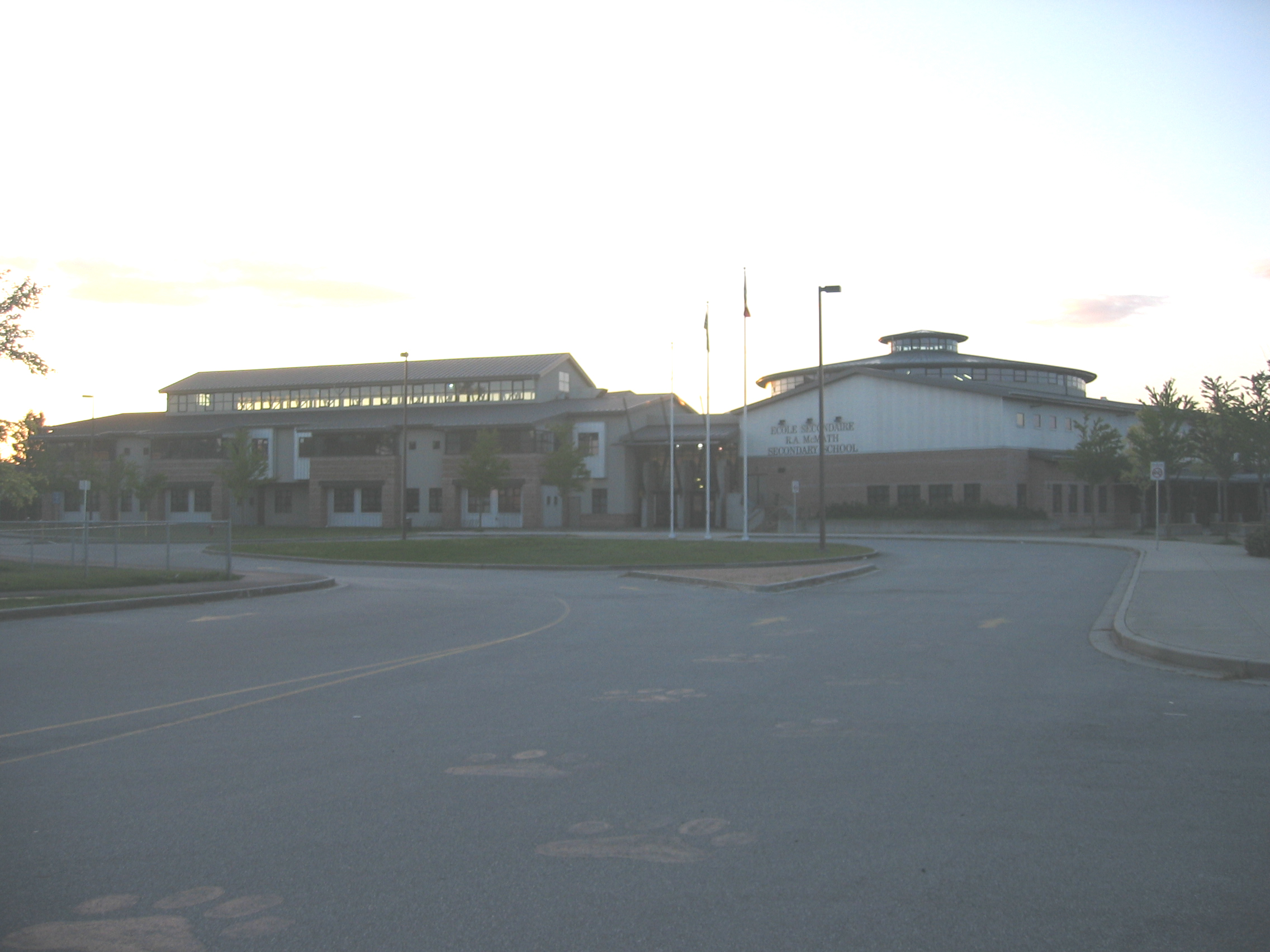

Location
- 4251 Garry St; Richmond, British Columbia, V7E 2T9; Canada; 49.13069°N 123.17874°W

Information
- School type: Public, high school
- Motto: "Together We Learn!"
- Founded: September 1998
- School board: School District 38 Richmond
- Superintendent: Scott Robinson
- Area trustee: Ken Hamaguchi
- Principal: Aviva Vaughan
- Staff: 97
- Grades: 8–12
- Enrollment: 1400 (September 2019)
- Language: English, French
- Area: Steveston, Richmond
- Colours: Black, blue, white
- Mascot: Willy the Wildcat
- Team name: McMath Wildcats
- Website: mcmath.sd38.bc.ca

École Secondaire Robert A. McMath Secondary School is a public high school located on Garry Street in the Steveston neighbourhood of Richmond, British Columbia. It is part of School District 38 Richmond

The school is fed into by the nearby elementary schools of Lord Byng Elementary School, Westwind Elementary School, Manoah Steves Elementary School, John G. Diefenbaker Elementary School, Dixon Elementary School and Homma Elementary School as well as all French immersion students from 15 other elementary schools in western Richmond.

As of 2023, the current principal is J. Johnstone. The school's sports teams are all called the McMath Wildcats. McMath uses the semester system with PLT (Personal Learning Time).

Notable alumni include: Anna Cathcart, Camryn Rogers and Ampers&One's Brian Ho

== History ==
This school was named in honour of Robert Alexander "Bob" McMath (1915–1996). McMath moved to Canada in 1928. He served with the Seaforth Highlanders of Canada during the Second World War and was wounded in Italy. In 1951, McMath was elected as a school trustee in the city of Richmond, and from 1957 until his retirement in 1993 he served on Richmond's Municipal Council.

The school — Richmond's newest high school — opened in 1997 and serves grades 8 to 12. In September 2004, it became a bilingual school, providing a French immersion program.
