= Robert Cecil Palmer Secondary School =

R.C. Palmer Secondary School

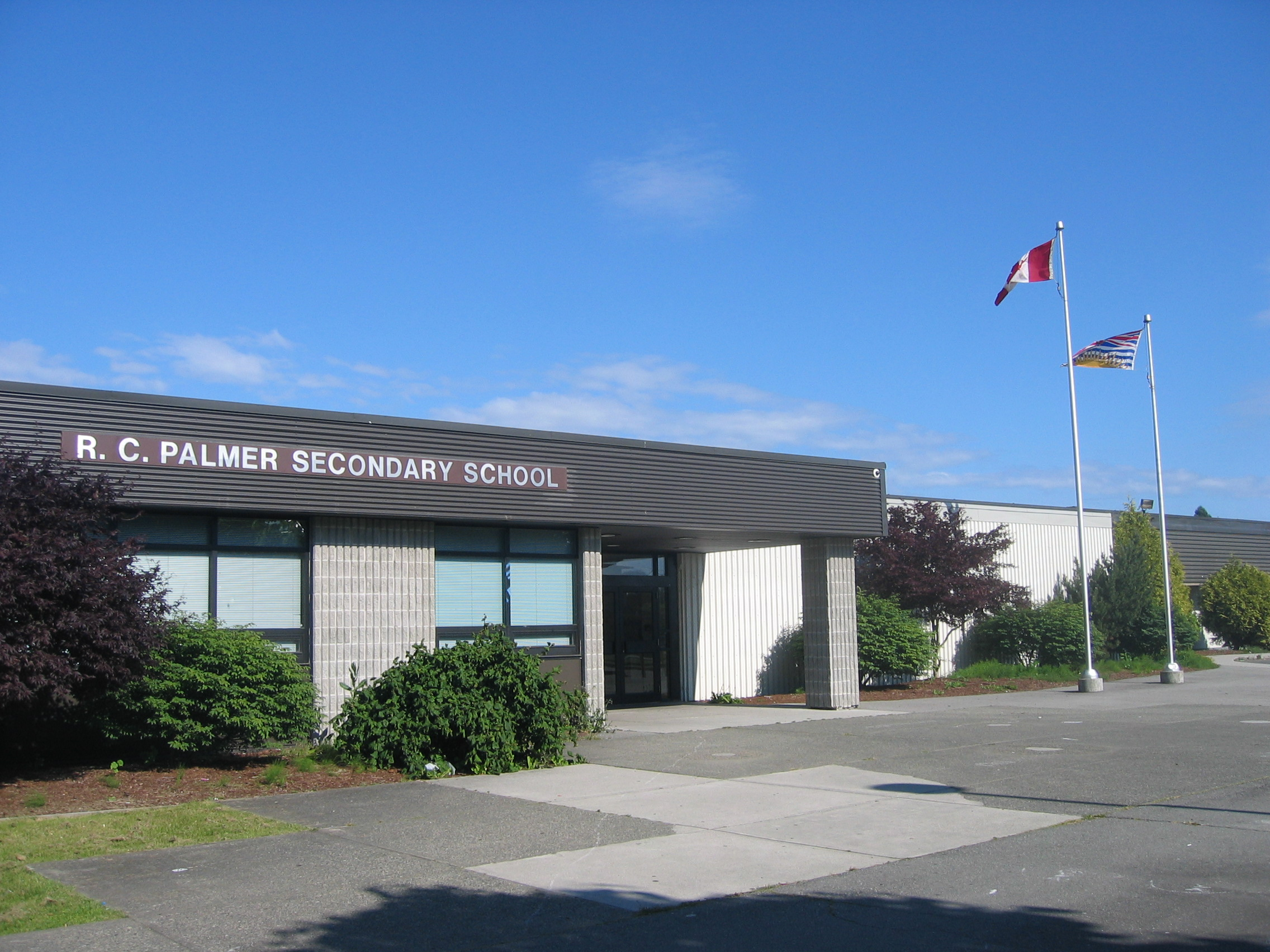
- Front entrance

Location
- 8160 St. Albans Rd; Richmond, British Columbia, V6Y 2K9; Canada; 49.15404°N 123.12921°W

Information
- School type: Public, Secondary School
- Motto: KUDOS (For Valour)
- Founded: 1959
- Status: Open
- School board: School District 38 Richmond
- Superintendent: Scott Robinson
- Area trustee: Debbie Tablotney
- School code: 03838024
- Principal: Herj Ghaug
- Grades: 8–12
- Gender: Mixed
- Age range: 13–17
- Enrollment: 985 (2021)
- Language: English
- Schedule type: Semester
- Area: Richmond, British Columbia
- Colours: Navy, Powder Blue, White
- Mascot: Griffin
- Team name: Palmer Griffins
- Exam average: 74.6 (2019)
- Feeder schools: Howard DeBeck Elementary; Garden City Elementary; General Currie Elementary
- Public Transit: Translink Bus Lines, 401, 408 and 403; Closest Skytrain Station, Richmond-Brighouse
- Website: palmer.sd38.bc.ca

Robert Cecil Palmer Secondary School, (commonly, R.C. Palmer Secondary School, RCPSS, RCP, and Palmer Secondary School) is a public, co-educational secondary school situated in Richmond, British Columbia, Canada which educates students in grades 8–12. Palmer Secondary School is part of the Richmond School District. It is the only school in Richmond to offer the Pre-AP Incentive Program, the ACE-IT plumbing program and, previously, the Palmer Hockey Academy. The Richmond Virtual School is also hosted in the Palmer building.

== History ==
Robert C. Palmer Junior High School first opened in September 1959 with an enrollment of 769. This school is named after Robert Cecil Palmer, a Richmond resident and magistrate in the provincial court for 22 years. The school suffered a terrible fire on April 10, 1976. The school underwent two renovations in 1978 to recover from the fire. In 1996, the Richmond School District converted all senior (Grade 11 and 12 only) and junior (Grade 9 and 10 only) high schools to full spectrum grade 8 to 12 schools. Palmer officially reopened in May 2000 as a full grade 8 to 12 secondary school.

== Motto and colours ==
School Crest

The school colours, navy blue and powder blue, were chosen in 1959 by the student council. The school's Greek motto, KUDOS, can be translated to "for valour" or "for honour" and it is a part of the school's crest designed by the first art department.

== Palmer Griffins ==
The Griffin represents the Palmer family and is a part of the Palmer Family coat of arms. It is a mythological creature that is a hybrid of both lion and eagle. Griffins are a symbol of wisdom, strength, and loyalty. The Palmer Griffin name is often used for Palmer's athletic teams.

== Curriculum and programs ==
Palmer uses the semester system. The school year is divided into 2 semesters. Students take a minimum of 6 courses to a maximum of 8 courses for the full year; students attend four 75-minute classes and rotate the classes in the second half of the year/the second semester. Palmer also utilizes a new system established locally within the Richmond School District called "Personal Learning Time". During this period, the classes are shortened by 10–20 minutes, but in return there is a 5th "class"/block added to the time table. During Personal Learning Time students can work with peers on projects or see their instructors for additional support.

=== Grading scale ===
Palmer uses the same grading scale as established by the BC Ministry of Education.

Grade	Percentage
A	86% or higher
B	73% – 85%
C+	67% – 72%
C	60% – 66%
C-	50% – 59%
I, F	49% or less

For anything less than 49%, students will be assigned an "I" (Incomplete) which will turn into an "F" (Fail) if course requirements are not completed.

=== Pre-AP/Incentive program ===
Palmer offers honours-level courses through its selective Pre-AP/Incentive program. The program develops academic excellence and offers acceleration for subjects in math, science, and social studies. The Incentive program also challenges students with leadership opportunities, outdoor and physical education, and community service, with the intent of building strong personal character. The Incentive program is established on the basis of promoting a well-rounded education for high school students and to develop learners to think critically.

Entry to the program is by application, followed by an entrance exam and an interview.

As of 2016–2017, the program offers:

- Enriched (honours) courses in English, math, social studies, and science
- Two-year accelerated track for Grade 8, 9, and 10 math and science
- Preparation for AP courses and exams in Grade 12
- Trips and outdoor camp experiences to complement Incentive classes
- Leadership and community service opportunities
- Development of personal character

=== AP program ===
Advanced Placement (AP) courses are offered at the school and are taken by qualified Grade 11-12 students by selective application. These classes are taught through semester system except for AP Psychology which is taught through “Richmond Virtual School” and meets once a week throughout the school year. These classes are taught by senior and experienced teachers including John Shim (AP Chemistry, AP Psychology), Lawrence Liang (AP Biology).

As of 2016–2025, the following five AP courses are offered:

- AP Calculus AB
- AP Chemistry
- AP Physics
- AP English Language and Composition
- AP Psychology

=== ACE IT career preparatory program ===
The Accelerated Credit Enrolment in Industry Training (ACE IT) program is the in-class component of a high school apprenticeship. ACE IT students are Youth Apprentices registered with the Industry Training Authority (ITA).

ACE IT programs are usually offered as partnerships between school districts and post-secondary institutions with onsite training at either location. Students who successfully complete the ACE IT program earn credit towards both high school graduation and a post-secondary credential. Enrolment in the ACE IT program is free.

Palmer is the only school in Richmond that houses the plumbing program for the ACE IT program.

=== Independent studies program ===
Independent Directed Studies (IDS), co-operated with the Richmond Virtual School, under teacher supervision, allow students to initiate their own learning on a subject of choice and earn credits towards graduation. Students must submit an IDS application and have previously shown independent work abilities and excellent work ethics to enroll in the course.

=== Collaboration day schedule ===
RC Palmer Secondary School has been working with the Collaboration Time late start model for a number of years. Currently, Palmer Staff meet in groups on the first Tuesday of every month for 75 minutes to work on initiatives related to enhancing student achievement and engagement.

== Athletics ==
Palmer competes in the RSSAA (Richmond Secondary School Athletic Association) with other schools in the School District No.38.

=== Fall ===
- Girls' Volleyball
- Boys' Soccer

=== Winter ===
- Girls' Basketball
- Boys' Basketball

=== Spring ===
- Tennis
- Ultimate Frisbee
- Track & Field
- Badminton
- Boys' Volleyball
- Girls' Soccer
- Golf

=== Intramurals ===
The intramural program is an opportunity given to all students, regardless of skill level, to participate in an athletic activity. The intramural games occur during lunch time, where students participate in a variety of activities in the gymnasium. The activities are open to all students and the intramural season runs for about a month long, concluding with playoffs.

Intramural sports offered include:

- 5 on 5 Basketball
- 3 on 3 Basketball
- Volleyball
- Badminton
- Dodgeball
- Cageball
- Soccer

=== Basketball team ===
The school hosts a basketball program for students that replaces the regular P.E. course with an all-basketball program and teaches the fundamentals, tricks, and plays of the sport. In 2007, the senior basketball team made it to the 63rd Annual Telus-BCHSBBA Boys Provincial Basketball Championships, held in the PNE Agrodome. In 2011, they won the Provincial Championships at the Langley Events Centre.

=== Athletic achievements ===
British Columbia Provincial Champions:

- 2018 – AA Senior Ultimate Frisbee
- 2011 – Senior Boys Basketball
- 1993 – Junior Football
- 1992 – Junior Boys Basketball
- 1992 – Junior Girls Basketball
- 1991 – Junior Football
- 1991 – Junior Boys Basketball
- 1990 – Bantam Girls Basketball
- 1989 – Junior Football
- 1989 – Junior Girls Basketball
- 1988 – Junior Football
- 1986 – Junior Boys Basketball
- 1985 – Junior Girls Basketball

Lower Mainland Champions:

- 2018 – AA Senior Ultimate Frisbee
- 2011 – Senior Boys Basketball
- 2010 – Senior Boys Soccer
- 2009 – Senior Boys Basketball

RSSAA League Champions:

- 2018 – Senior Ultimate
- 2017 – Juvenile Girls Basketball
- 2014 – Junior Boys Basketball
- 2014 – Senior Boys Basketball
- 2013 – Senior Boys Basketball
- 2012 – Senior Boys Basketball
- 2012 – Bantam Boys Basketball
- 2011 – Senior Boys Basketball
- 2010 – Senior Boys Basketball
- 2010 – Junior Boys Basketball
- 2009 – Senior Boys Basketball
- 2009 – Bantam Boys Basketball
- 2008 – Senior Boys Basketball
- 2008 – Juvenile Boys Basketball
- 2008 – Senior Boys Soccer
- 2007 – Senior Boys Basketball
- 2007 – Junior Boys Basketball
- 2007 – Bantam Boys Basketball
- 2006 – Juvenile Boys Basketball
- 2006 – Junior Boys Soccer
- 2005 – Junior Boys Basketball
- 2005 – Bantam Boys Basketball
- 2003 – Senior Girls Basketball
- 2003 – Bantam Boys Basketball
- 2001 – Bantam Badminton
- 2000 – Juvenile Boys Table Tennis
- 2000 – Bantam Badminton
- 1999 – Junior Boys Basketball
- 1998 – Ultimate
- 1998 – Junior Boys Basketball
- 1998 – Bantam Badminton
- 1997 – Bantam Boys Basketball
- 1997 – Bantam Badminton
- 1997 – Juvenile Girls Volleyball
- 1996 – Juvenile Boys Basketball

== School excellence ==
=== Science fair achievements ===
Palmer is actively involved in promoting interest in the fields of STEM and research. The school has hosted the Palmer Annual Science Fair (Richmond District) since 2008 and sponsors the 1st place, 2nd place, and, sometimes, 3rd place of the fair to compete in the Greater Vancouver Regional Science Fair.

Year	Gold	Silver	Bronze	Hon. Mention	Special Award	Total	Participating Teams
2017	1	0	1	1	3	6	4
2016	1	2	1	2	10	16	6
2015	2	1	2	1	7	13	8
2014	1	1	1	1	4	8	6
2013	0	1	0	1	3	5	7
2012	0	0	1	2	3	6	8
2011	0	0	1	0	4	5	4
2010	1	0	1	0	2	4	6
2009	1	0	1	0	0	2	7
2008	0	1	0	1	2	4	8

The school's teams had also won multiple medals at the Canada-Wide Science Fair (CWSF).

- 2015, Microcontroller Controlled Laser Area Denial (M-CLAD)
  - Gold, Excellence Award – Senior
  - Dalhousie University Faculty of Science Entrance Scholarship
  - UBC Science (Vancouver) Entrance Award
  - University of Manitoba Entrance Scholarship
  - University of Ottawa Entrance Scholarship
  - Western University Scholarship
  - University of New Brunswick Entrance Scholarship
- 2014, Concentrated Photovoltaic Thermoelectric Hybrid Systems (C.P.T.H.)
  - Bronze, Excellence Award – Intermediate
  - Western University Scholarship
- 2010, A Statistical Approach to the Applications of Fractal Geometry
  - Discovery Channel Math Award
- 2009, Cancer-Killing Combinations
  - Canadian Society for Medical Laboratory Science Award
  - The University of Western Ontario Scholarship
  - Gold, Health Sciences, Excellence Award – Intermediate

=== Destination Imagination (DI) achievements ===
Destination Imagination is a volunteer-led, educational non-profit organization that teaches 21st century skills and STEM principles to kindergarten through university level students through creative and collaborative problem-solving challenges. In the past, Palmer has won 1st and 2nd in 2014, 2013, 2010, 2009, and 2006 Destination Imagination British Columbia Provincial Tournament. The team is most notable for their Instant Challenge excellence, which Palmer had earned 2 consecutive gold medals at the Provincial level.

=== Mathematical competition achievements ===
Palmer students enrolled in Enriched Math or Pre-Calculus courses are encouraged to take part in the various math contests that occur annually. Palmer also houses a Junior and Senior Math Club which works on math contest problems and promotes interest in math.

Math Challengers:

- 2016 – 2nd, Grade 8 Regional
- 2015 – 3rd, Grade 9 Regional
- 2014 – 3rd, Grade 8 Regional
- 2012 – 3rd, Grade 9 Regional
- 2012 – 4th, Grade 8 Regional
- 2011 – 1st, Grade 8 Regional
- 2011 – 4th, Grade 9 Regional
- 2010 – 1st, Grade 9 Regional
- 2009 – 1st, Grade 8 Regional
- 2009 – 3rd, Grade 9 Regional
- 2007 – 3rd, Grade 9 Regional

CEMC Math Competition:

- 2017 Pascal Contest Provincial Champion
- 2016 Pascal Contest Zone Champion
- 2014 Pascal Contest Zone Champion
- 2012 Pascal Contest Zone Champion
- 2008 Cayley Contest Zone Champion
- 1999 Euclid Contest Zone Champion
- 1999 Fermat Contest Zone Champion
- 1998 Cayley Contest Zone Champion
- 1996 Pascal Contest Zone Champion

== Notable alumni ==
- Edison Chen, Hong Kong-based entertainer
- Bobby Singh, Canadian football guard for the Calgary Stampeders and school trustee for School District 38 Richmond
