= Richmond Secondary School =

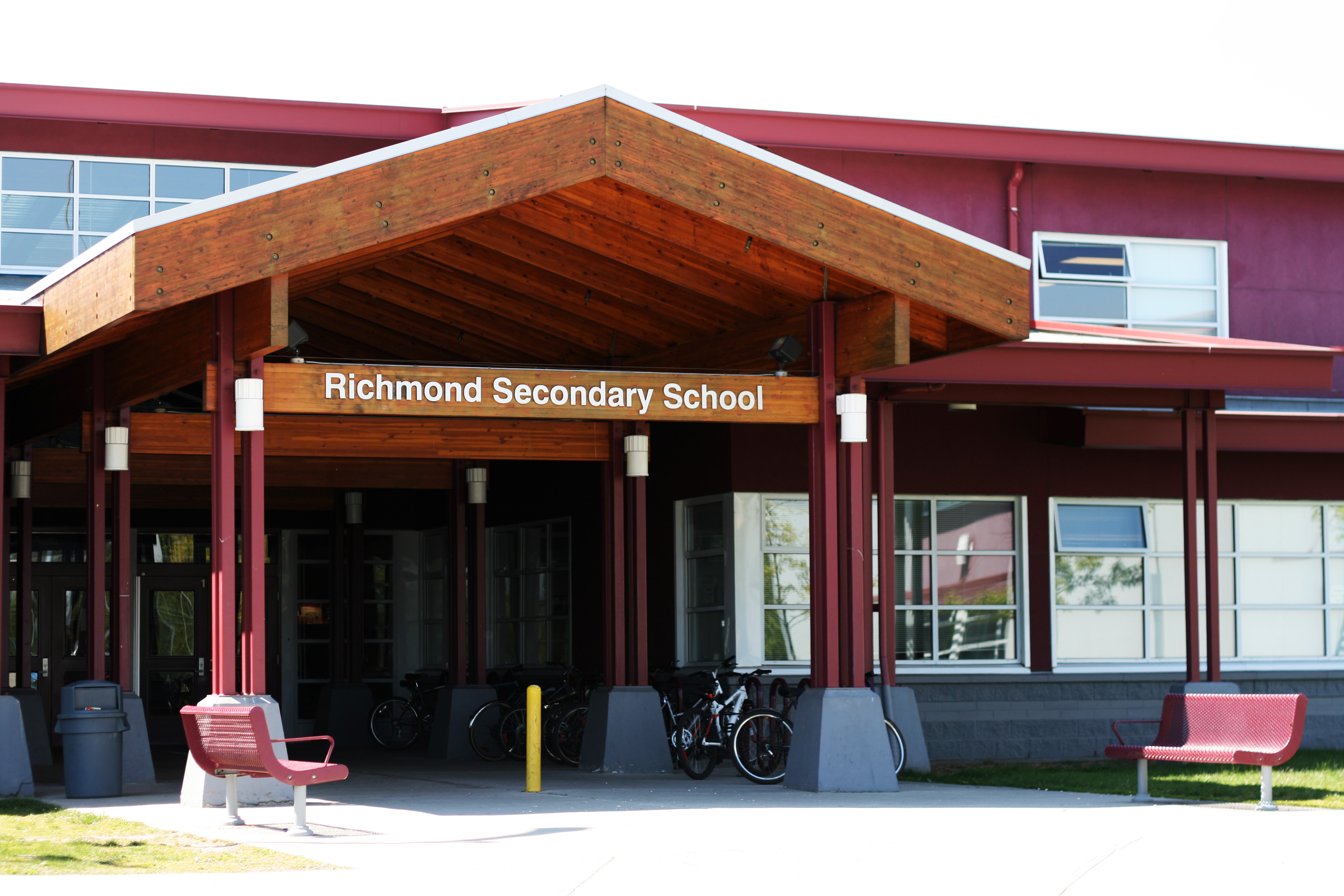

Location
- 7171 Minoru Blvd; Richmond, British Columbia, V6Y 1Z3; Canada; 49.16135°N 123.14268°W

Information
- School type: Public, high school
- Founded: 1927
- School board: School District 38 Richmond
- Superintendent: Christopher Usih
- Area trustee: Ken Hamaguchi
- School code: 03838065
- Principal: Navshina Savory
- Staff: 100
- Grades: 8–12
- Enrollment: 1,184 (2024/2025)
- Language: English
- Colours: Maroon Grey White
- Mascot: Colts
- Website: rhs.sd38.bc.ca

Richmond Secondary School, (commonly, Richmond High School, RHS, and RSS) is a public, co-educational secondary school located in Richmond, British Columbia, Canada. It educates approximately 1200 students from grades 8 to 12. Richmond Secondary is the only school in Richmond that offers the International Baccalaureate Diploma Programme and is a magnet school in the region.

== History ==
Richmond Secondary School is the City of Richmond's first high school. Originally established in 1927 on Cambie and Sexsmith street as Richmond High School, it has undergone location, name and organizational structure changes throughout its history.

Originally, Richmond High served grades 9 to 11 only (graduation was grade 11 at that time). The first major change occurred in 1937 with the addition of grades 8 and 9 to the school. The school was renamed "Richmond Junior-Senior High School" to reflect the change.

In 1952, Richmond Junior-Senior High School moved to its current location at the intersection of Minoru Blvd (then Foster Road) and Granville Avenue. It was also then converted back to a senior high school, offering programs for grades 11 and 12 students only. Its name was changed to "Richmond Senior High School". The old facility on Cambie was renamed "Cambie Junior High School" and served grades 7 through 10.

In 1996, all Richmond secondary schools were converted to full spectrum grade 8–12 schools. Those schools had formerly been either senior (grades 11–12) or junior high schools (grades 8–10). Richmond High was then renamed "Richmond Secondary School".

In the early 2000s, construction of a $16.6 million replacement building began on the school's grass field. The new building opened on 5 January 2004. That same year, the 50-year-old previous building was demolished and replaced with artificial turf.

== Curriculum and notable programs ==
=== International Baccalaureate Programme ===
Richmond Secondary School has been an IB World School since July 1984 and is the only school in Richmond to offer the International Baccalaureate Diploma Programme.

=== Global Perspectives Program ===
Richmond Secondary previously offered the Global Perspectives Program for Grade 12 students. Founded by former RHS teacher Ken Lorenz in 1995, in the Global Perspectives course students embarked on humanitarian trips to provide aid for those in developing countries. In March 2009, its 15th year, Global Perspectives guided students to Paraguay in cooperation with the Steve Nash Foundation. 28 students, 5 teachers along with a 6 person dental team travelled to Concepcion, Paraguay and undertook in the construction of an extension onto the Child Well-Being Centre (Centro de Bienestar Infantil) in. In addition to their hands-on work in the region, Global Perspectives raised $10,000 for the Steve Nash Foundation’s precancer screening and treatment clinic to benefit young women just outside Paraguay’s capital. The Global Perspectives team of 2012/2013 assisted the Samoa government in repairing damages caused by the 2009 Samoa earthquake and tsunami. This represented the 19th annual project since the programme's conception.

=== Pre-employment and career-prep programs ===
Richmond Secondary offers courses and programs designed to prepare students for life beyond high school and the workforce. In addition to applied skills elective courses such as drafting and CAD, woodworks, metal fabrication, and automotives, students may choose to enroll in the pre-employment program. This program combines academics and work experience to help students develop skills necessary for the job market.

Richmond Secondary also hosts the school district's only student chef training program. Student-trainees prepare meals and desserts in the school's full kitchen which are served during breakfast and lunch hours. Richmond Secondary also has a well-equipped metal and woodworking shop, theatre, and music room.

RSS hosted the "Colt Young Parent Program" up until 2025, a program designed to meet the needs of pregnant and parenting teenagers.

== Athletics ==
Richmond Secondary offers athletic teams for students including basketball, cross country, soccer, volleyball, swimming, golf, badminton, Ultimate Frisbee, table tennis, and track and field.

=== Basketball ===
The Richmond High basketball team were perennial provincial championship contenders in the 1980s and 90s under BC Basketball Hall of Fame inductee, coach Bill Disbrow. Disbrow's program and the teams he worked with have been viewed as the best in Canada during the 80s and 90s. Richmond High has won a record five BC AAA Provincial Championships and produced five BC MVPs, 25 All-stars, and many players who have played in the NCAA and on the Canada national men's basketball team.

Richmond Secondary BC AAA Basketball Provincial Championship Games
Year	Winning Team		Losing Team	
1975	North Delta Huskies	72	Richmond Colts	57
1979	Burnaby South Rebels	65	Richmond Colts	47
1984	Steveston Packers	84	Richmond Colts	59
1985	Richmond Colts	74	Centennial Centaurs	61
1987	Richmond Colts	75	MEI Eagles	70
1988	Richmond Colts	99	Seaquam Seahawks	80
1990	North Delta Huskies	75	Richmond Colts	66
1991	Richmond Colts	94	Burnaby Central Wildcats	78
1994	Terry Fox Ravens	73	Richmond Colts	66
1998	Richmond Colts	76	Vancouver College Fighting Irish	66

RHS ties Vancouver College, Oak Bay High School, and Burnaby South Rebels for the second most number of BC provincial championships won (5).

=== Football ===
Richmond High also boasted a strong football team throughout the 1980s and 90s. The football program at Richmond Secondary ended in 2000 due to a shortage of players.

Richmond Secondary BC AAA Football Provincial Championship Games
Year	Winning Team		Losing Team	
1976	Richmond Colts	3	Notre Dame Jugglers	0
1983	Kamloops Red Devils	13	Richmond Colts	12
1987	Notre Dame Jugglers	40	Richmond Colts	6
1996	Richmond Colts	25	Vancouver College Fighting Irish	22
1997	Richmond Colts	43	Mouat Hawks	7
1998	Richmond Colts	27	STMC Knights	20

Ultimate Frisbee

The team has lasted for many years. But when two coaches from Vancouver joined the program in 2009, the team started to become a powerhouse. The program produced many junior national and world level players. Richmond High ended up with consecutive wins in cities and a 4th-place finish in Tier 1 provincials ('14), marking the highest standing of a Richmond School in provincials until 2016.

Richmond Secondary City Championship Games
Year	Round	Winning Team		Losing Team	
2004	Quarter	Hugh Boyd	W	Richmond High	L
2005	Final	J N Burnett	W	Richmond High	L
2006	Semi	Steveston-London	13	Richmond High	9
2007	Final	Steveston-London	W	Richmond High	L
2008	Quarter	J N Burnett	12	Richmond High	8
2009	Final	McMath	W	Richmond High	L
2010	Final	Hugh McRoberts	W	Richmond High	L
2011	Final	McMath	W	Richmond High	L
2013	Final	McMath	W	Richmond High	L
2014	Final	McMath	W	Richmond High	L
2015	Semi	A.R. MacNeill	9	Richmond High	6
2016	Final	Hugh McRoberts	11	Richmond High	10

== Demographics ==
Richmond Secondary School is notable for its racial diversity and its large Asian population. As of the 2009–2010 school year, 54.8% of students listed Chinese (either Mandarin, Cantonese, or a local dialect), and 72.3% of students reported a language other than English as the primary language used at home. While unusual for a North American school, the city of Richmond has the highest percentage of immigrants of any city in Canada.

Richmond High's feeder schools are Samuel Brighouse Elementary School, William Douglas Ferris Elementary School, and Blundell Elementary School.

== Notable alumni ==
- Shaul Gordon (born 1994), Canadian-Israeli Olympic sabre fencer
- Kyle Hamilton, rower and Olympic gold medalist
- Andrew Mavis, basketball player; played for Canada at the 2000 Summer Olympics
- Jim Mills, former NFL player for the Baltimore Colts
- Gary Fung, founder and administrator of the BitTorrent index site isohunt
- Goldie Semple, actress, primarily at Shaw and Stratford Festivals
- Bobby Singh, CFL Player for the Winnipeg Blue Bombers
- Ryan Stiles, comedian, actor, director. Best known for performing in Whose Line Is It Anyway? and his role as Herb Melnick in Two and a Half Men.
- Bjarni Tryggvason, Canadian Space Agency Astronaut
