= Steveston-London Secondary School =

Steveston-London Secondary
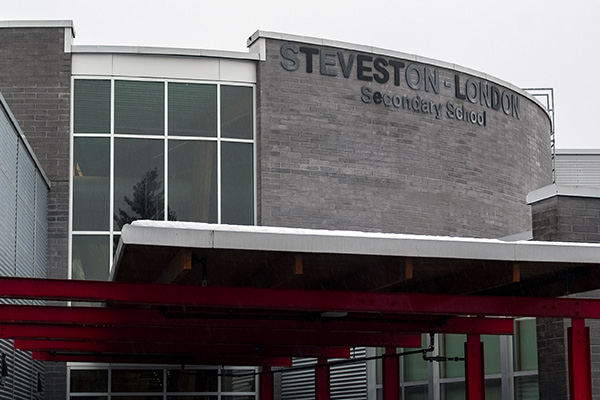

Location
- 6600 Williams Rd; Richmond, British Columbia, V7E 1K5; Canada; 49°08′20″N 123°08′57″W

Information
- School type: Public, high school
- Founded: 2007
- School board: School District 38 Richmond
- Principal: Ms. A. Kwon
- Grades: 8–12
- Enrollment: 1250 (September 2026)
- Colour
- Mascot: Sharks
- Team name: SLSS Sharks
- Website: slss.sd38.bc.ca

Steveston-London Secondary School (SLSS) is a public high school in Richmond, British Columbia for grades 8–12. It was established in 2007 as the result of a merger between Steveston Secondary School and Charles E. London Secondary School, which were opened in 1956 and 1975, respectively.

== History ==
Before the establishment of Steveston-London Secondary School in 2007, Steveston Secondary School and Charles E. London Secondary School were located 400 metres (440 yd) apart on either side of a large field.

=== Steveston Secondary School ===
Stevenston Secondary School opened as a junior secondary school in 1956, after voters in Richmond, British Columbia approved plans to construct additional schools in the fast-growing community. It was named after the nearby neighbourhood of Steveston. The school plans included 16 classrooms, industrial arts areas, home economics units, and a gymnasium. Because of increases in enrollment, the school board authorized an addition of 10 classrooms in December 1957. The first class of students graduated in 1958.

In 1959, it became a combined junior-senior secondary school. In 1965, the school became a senior secondary school which served only grades 11 and 12. In 1996, it was expanded again to serve grades 8 through 12 after Richmond's junior and senior schools merged.

In need of repairs, a decision was made in 2005 to close the school; it closed in 2007. The property was sold to Polygon Homes Ltd. for $41 million, and the building was demolished over the course of mid-2015 to summer 2016.

=== Charles E. London Secondary School ===
Charles E. London Junior Secondary School opened in 1975, and served grades 8 through 10. It was named after an early Richmond settler.

A fire in 1991 caused extensive damage to administrative and counseling offices, causing smoke damage to a staff room. Damages amounted to $750,000, and Richmond School District 38 authorized 7,000 square metres (8,400 sq yd) of demolition and renovation, as well as 3,200 square metres (3,800 sq yd) of new construction, and about 0.67 hectares (1.7 acres) of asphalt paving and landscaping. The legal guardians of a former student were sued for $920,000 for damages in connection with the fire. The school alleged that the student committed arson; the student and his guardian denied the charges.

One notable program at Charles E. London was the aviation career preparation program, a partnership with Canadian Airlines that prepared students to enter flight school or the BCIT aircraft maintenance engineering program.

=== Formation of Steveston-London Secondary School ===
Due to declining enrollments, Steveston Secondary and Charles E. London Secondary were merged in 2007 with a $19 million renovation from the Government of British Columbia. It occupies the site of the former Charles E. London Secondary School.

The name "Steveston-London Secondary School" was chosen on June 14, 2006 in a student vote from both schools.

== Notable alumni ==
- Fardaws Aimaq, basketball player
