= Brighouse, Richmond =

Neighbourhood in Richmond, British Columbia

Brighouse
- Neighbourhood
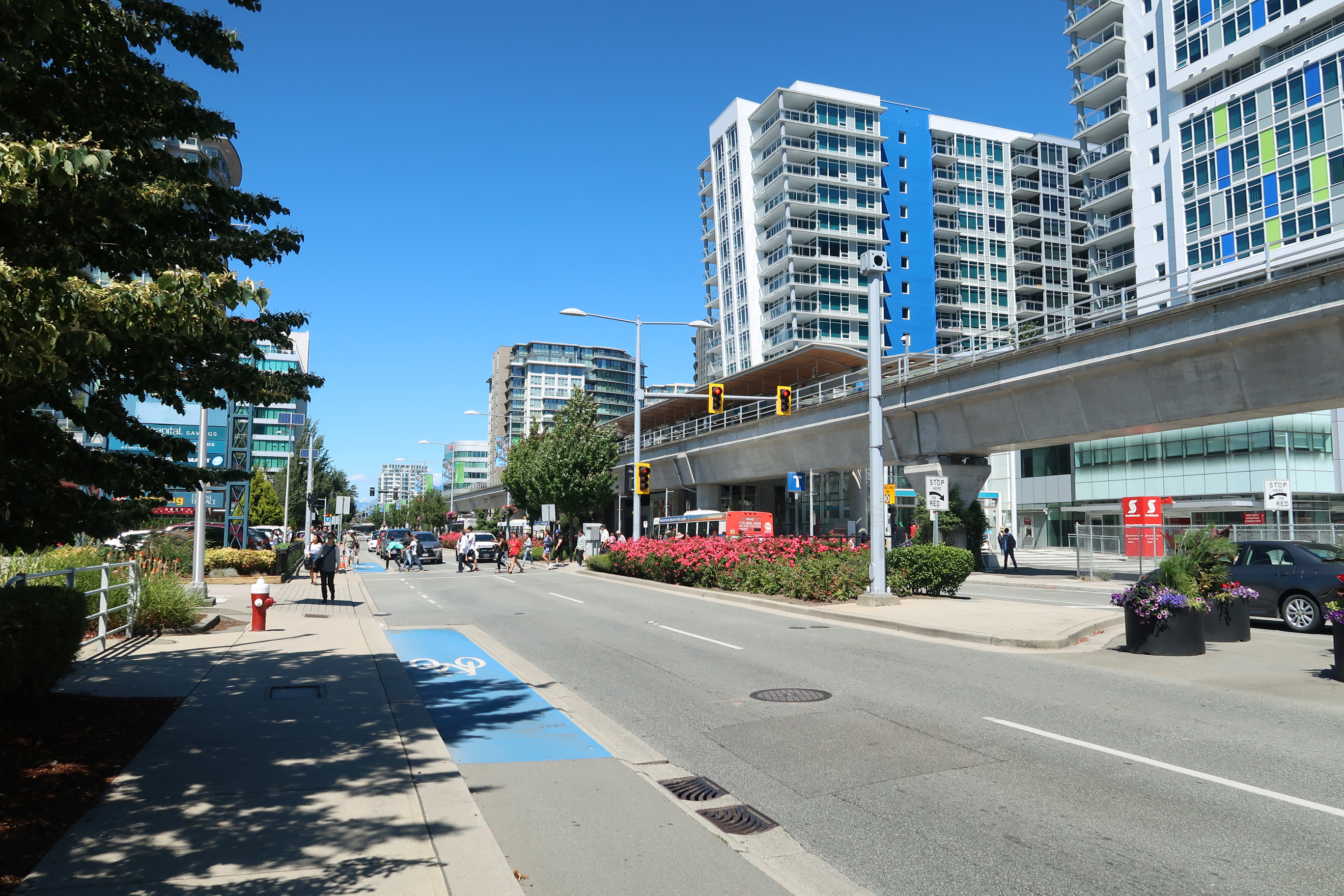

- Location of Brighouse in British Columbia Brighouse (Canada) Brighouse (North America)
- Coordinates: 49°10′1.2″N 123°7′55.2″W
- Country: Canada
- Province: British Columbia
- City: Richmond
- Time zone: UTC−8 (Pacific)
  - Summer (DST): UTC−7 (PDT)

Brighouse is a neighbourhood that comprises most of the urban core of Richmond in Metro Vancouver. The area includes community facilities, civic offices, Richmond Centre, and the Canada Line Richmond–Brighouse station terminus.

== History ==
=== Samuel Brighouse ===
In 1862, Samuel Brighouse (1836–1913) sailed from Milford Haven with his cousin John Morton to New York and then to Panama, to San Francisco and then to New Westminster. Partnering with William Hailstone, they became The Three Greenhorns, who joined the Cariboo Gold Rush, followed by land dealing in what would become downtown Vancouver. In 1864, Brighouse acquired 697 acres on Lulu Island, enclosed within today's No. 2 Rd., Granville Ave., No. 3 Rd., and the Fraser River, where he grew crops and raised livestock. He also owned and managed a dairy farm near New Westminster.

In 1880, Brighouse sold five acres near today's River and Cambie roads, upon which the first town hall and the Richmond Methodist Church were built. The following year, he leased out his farms and returned to his property on Burrard Inlet. His investments included canneries and an ice company. He promoted the incorporation of the Township of Richmond, and served two terms on the council. After the arrival of the Canadian Pacific Railway (CPR) in 1887, his land sales in Vancouver made him wealthy. In 1909, he sold land to create Minoru Park, Richmond's first racetrack. Suffering ill health, Brighouse returned to reside in his native Yorkshire in 1911.

=== Michael Wilkinson Brighouse ===
Sam Brighouse's sister and her sons, Michael (c. 1865–1932) and William A. Wilkinson, lived with him at the Lulu Island ranch from 1896 onward. Since 1888, Michael had assisted his uncle in managing the business enterprises. He served two terms on the Richmond council in 1894 and 1895, and one term as reeve in 1900. When the Minoru Park racetrack failed in 1914, Michael repurchased the property, and reopened it as the Brighouse Park Racetrack in 1920.

Michael was one of the several beneficiaries of Sam's estate. To become primary beneficiary, he added Brighouse to his surname to comply with a stipulation of his uncle's will. Frederick C. Morton was executor of the estate on Sam's death. However, during Sam's lifetime Michael had intermingled Sam's business funds with his own. Following a 1908 hospitalization, Sam's mental condition declined ultimately to a state of dementia. Questions arose as to whether Sam authorized certain company disbursements made by Michael. The trial judge found that Michael had not misappropriated business funds for his and William's personal use. The Court of Appeal, equally divided, dismissed the action. The Supreme Court reversed these verdicts making an award of about $100,000.

When a 1912 fire destroyed the town hall, opinion was divided regarding rebuilding by Brighouse Station on the BCER Marpole–Steveston interurban tram line. In 1919, Michael traded four acres of land near the station, the present City Hall site, and regained the original five acres sold in 1880.

=== Neighbourhood ===
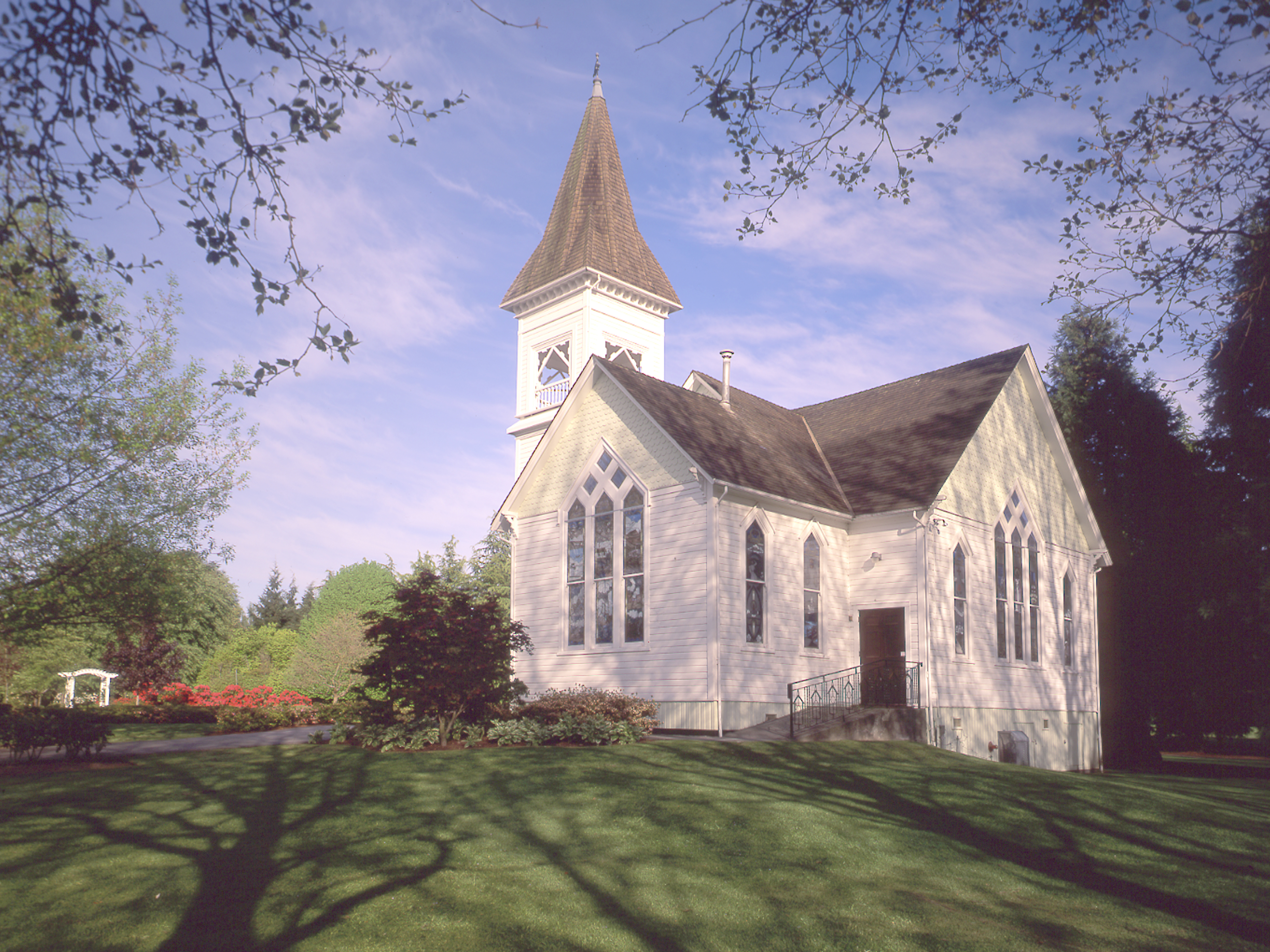
Minoru Chapel, 2012

In 1902, when CPR opened the line to Steveston, the station at the southeast corner of the Brighouse property was named Brighouse. In the absence of an existing settlement name, a locality usually assumed its station name. By 1909, this BCER station was the main one along the Richmond route. Elizabeth M. Stirton was the inaugural Brighouse postmaster 1922–1925. The second Richmond Town Hall opened across No.3 Rd. from the station in 1919, and the third rebuild in 1957. Businesses assumed names like Brighouse Grocery, Brighouse Café, and Brighouse Hardware, to indicate their proximity to the tram station. The line closed in 1958.

In 1947–48 the Lulu Theatre opened. In 1958, the municipality purchased the racetrack from the BC Turf and Country Club, developing it to become Minoru Park. Opening within the park area were the then outdoor Centennial Pool (1958), running track (1960), sports pavilion (1964–2014), stadium rink (1965), library (1976–1992), aquatic centre (1977), and activity centre (1986-2019). The Cultural Centre (1993) houses the library Brighouse branch, arts centre, archives, and museum. The Caring Place (1994–2019) provided social services. On the east side of Minoru Blvd., Richmond Square Shopping Centre (1963) later developed into Richmond Centre. In 2015, Sears, the anchor in the southern section, closed. High-rises will replace the vacant store and carpark building. On the No. 3 Rd/Granville corner, the city hall was rebuilt in 2000.

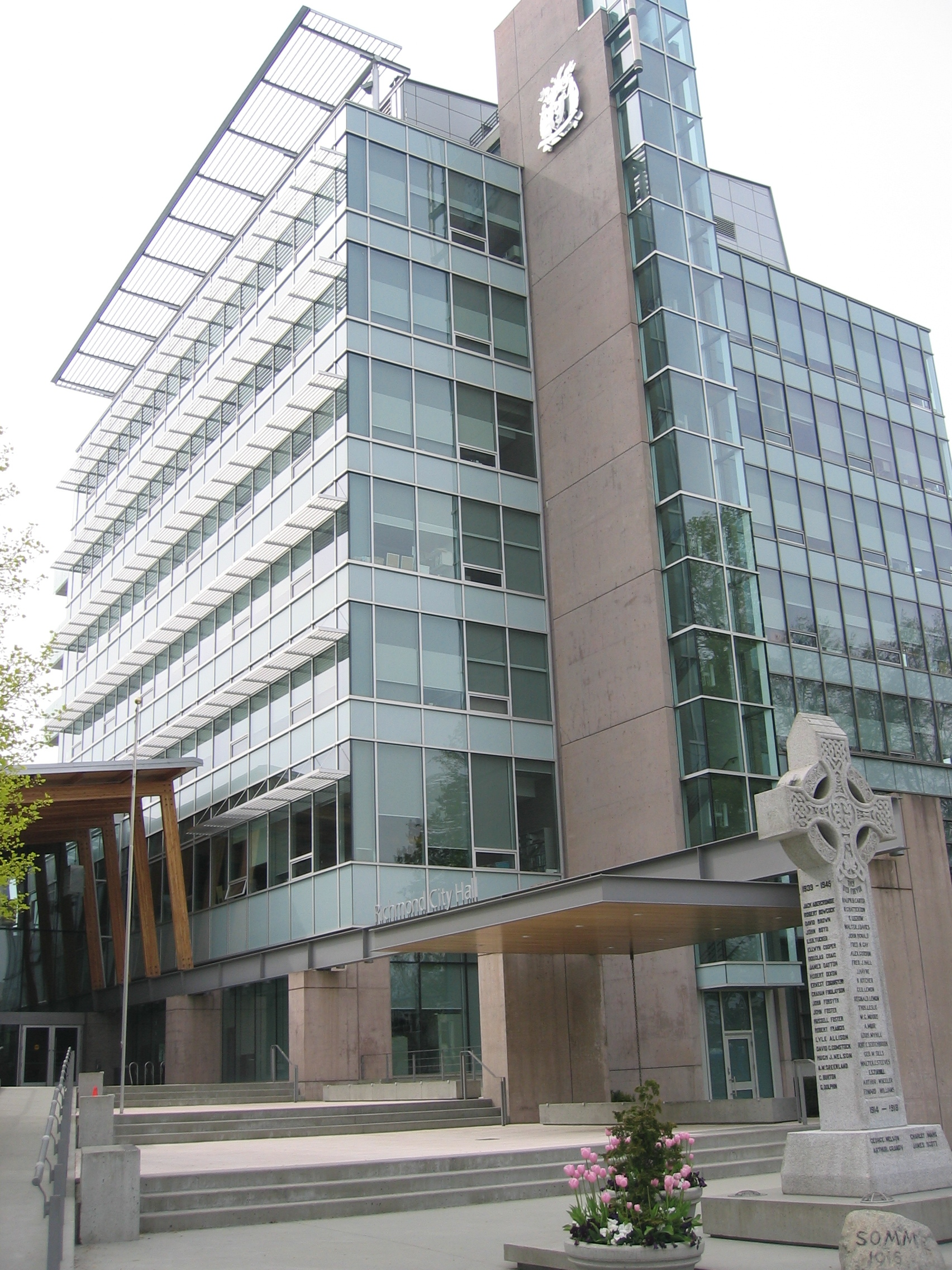
City Hall, Richmond, 2006

On the east side of Minoru Park are three high-rise rental apartment towers (1972). At the northwest end are Richmond Hospital (1966), relocated Minoru Chapel (1968), and the Gateway Theatre (1984). At the southwest end, Brighouse Fire Hall No. 1 (1968) was rebuilt for $24.4M (2018). Immediately to the northeast is the active living fitness centre that includes social services (2019). Construction deficiencies have delayed the opening of the new aquatic centre.

In 1962, the municipality purchased the Brighouse family estate, with part developed into Brighouse Industrial Estate, and a portion west of today's Gilbert Rd. sold to the Consolidated Building Corporation to become the Richmond Gardens residential development that was completed in 1965. Samuel Brighouse Elementary School (1965) served the residents prior to a $16.4M rebuild (2011). The industrial estate is transforming into high-rise apartments surrounding the Richmond Olympic Oval (2008), and is now regarded as the Oval neighbourhood. Formerly, few would have regarded this area as Brighouse proper.

Historically, Brighouse was ill-defined in common usage, but could be considered as a circle radiating out up to one kilometre (0.6 mi) from its BCER Brighouse station/municipal hall centre, thus including properties south of Granville Ave., such as Richmond Secondary School (1952), that was rebuilt (2004). With the progression of time, the circle shrank. The 98 B-Line map (2001) defines stops as Brighouse, Richmond Centre, Westminster Highway, etc. The 480 Richmond / UBC southern terminus was called Richmond Centre. The naming of the Canada Line terminus as Richmond–Brighouse station (2009) revived and redefined the Brighouse designation. The neighbourhood more resembles an ellipse, with this location and city hall the foci. Existing bus destinations became Brighouse Station. The Richmond–Brighouse Station bus loop, originally scheduled to open in 2019, was completed in 2020.

Although outside the original Sam Brighouse landholding, some regard Lansdowne Centre as part of Brighouse. However, this mall (1977), and the former Lansdowne Park racetrack (1924–1960) have retained their separate identity. Lansdowne station reinforces this distinction with respect to ongoing redevelopment.
