= Capstan =

Capstan may refer to:

- Capstan (band), an American post-hardcore band
- Capstan (cigarette), a brand of British cigarette
- Capstan (nautical), a rotating machine used to control or apply force to another element
- Capstan (tape recorder), rotating spindles used to move recording tape through the mechanism of a tape recorder
- Capstan equation, formula to describe hold-force in relation to load-force for flexible lines around a cylinder
- Horse capstan, a device similar to a windlass used in mining; also called a whim
- Slingsby Capstan, a British two-seat glider of the 1960s
- Capstan (software), audio restoration program by Celemony which eliminates wow and flutter
- Capstan Station, a station on the Canada Line of Metro Vancouver's SkyTrain rapid transit system.

== See also ==
- Rack and pinion
