= Oakridge, Vancouver =

Neighbourhood in Vancouver, British Columbia, Canada

Oakridge
- Neighbourhood
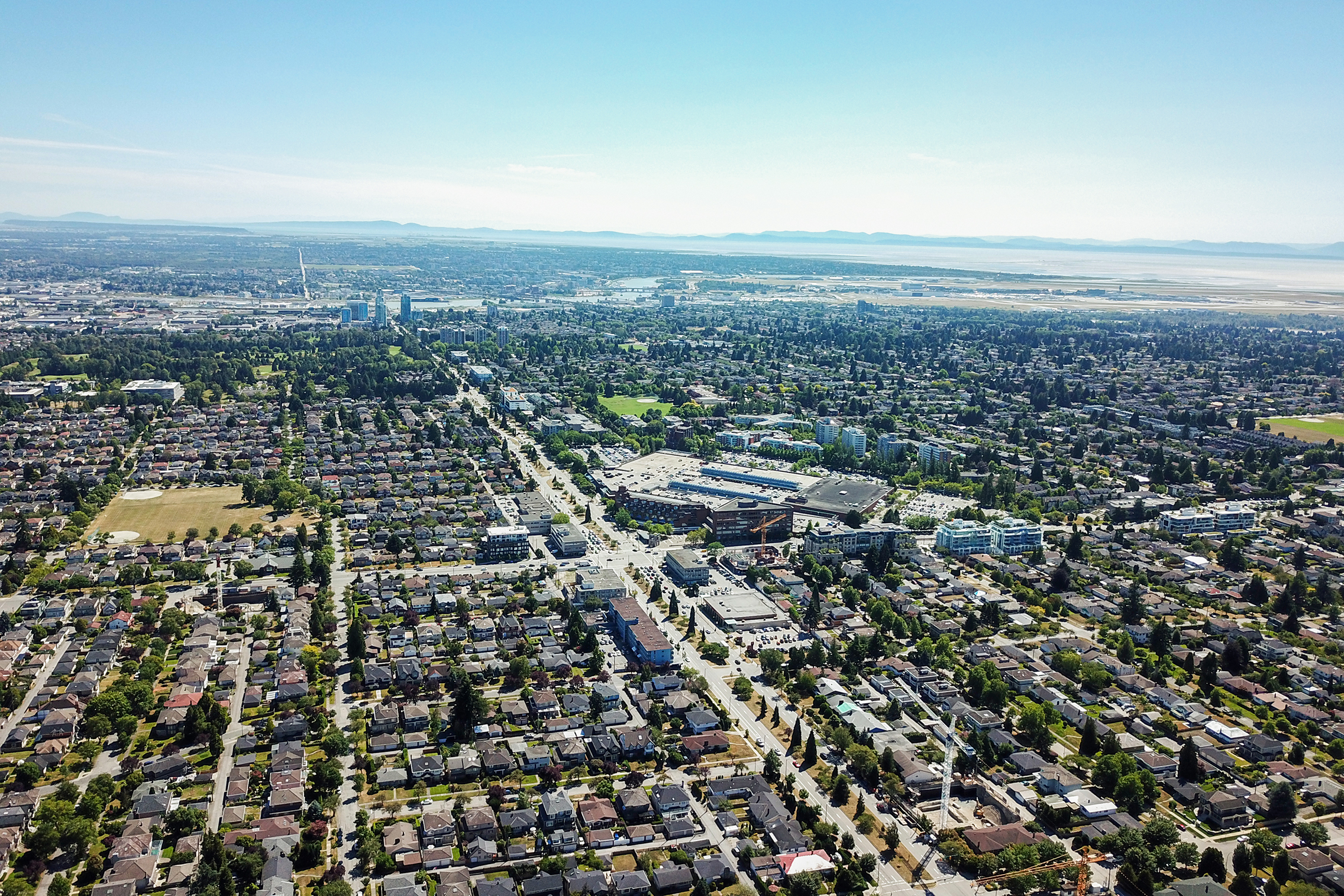
- Aerial view of Oakridge in 2018

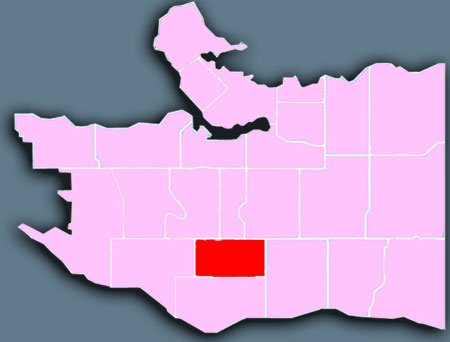
- Location of Oakridge in Vancouver
- Coordinates: 49°13′30″N 123°7′0″W
- Country: Canada
- Province: British Columbia
- Region: Lower Mainland
- Regional district: Metro Vancouver

Area
  - Total: 4.01 km^{2} (1.55 sq mi)

Population (2016)
  - Total: 13,030
  - Density: 3,249/km^{2} (8,410/sq mi)

Oakridge is a neighbourhood in Vancouver, British Columbia, Canada, with a multicultural residential and commercial area. It had a population of 13,030 in 2016, of which approximately 50 per cent have Chinese as their mother tongue.

== History ==
The Oakridge area was one of the last parts of Vancouver to be left in its natural state, with the exception of a golf course built near West 49th and Cambie in 1926 and some institutional construction including hospitals and boarding schools prior to World War II.

It was after the war that development began to expand into the wooded areas of Oakridge. The city's Jewish community moved south along Oak Street in the post-war years (the Jewish Community Centre was built at the intersection of West 41st Avenue and Oak), and the Canadian Pacific Railway opened its lands in the area to development that erupted in the 1950s. Much of the area was built with single-family homes, and the Oakridge Centre shopping mall, constructed in 1959 at West 41st Avenue and Cambie Street, provided a centrepoint for the residential boom.

Because of its later development, Oakridge is perhaps the least historic part of Vancouver. It was dominated by bungalow homes constructed in the 1950s and 1960s; however, in the last 10 years, many of these smaller houses have been torn down and have been replaced by larger multi-level residences.

A massive redevelopment of Oakridge Centre, which began in 2019, is currently ongoing to turn the suburban mall into a high-density, transit-oriented neighbourhood with multiple high-rises, the tallest in the city outside of the downtown peninsula, expected completion in 2027. It is deemed to become a secondary business and commercial centre to Downtown Vancouver and the Broadway corridor.

== Geography ==
Oakridge is a rectangular section of Vancouver bordered by the major thoroughfare Granville Street on the west and the busy multicultural route of Main Street on the east. West 41st Avenue marks the north border, with West 57th Avenue as the southern edge of the neighbourhood. Oak Street and Cambie Street, both among Vancouver's busiest roads, also run north–south through Oakridge, making for plenty of traffic during morning and evening rush hours. In total, Oakridge encompasses 401 hectares.

Climate data for Oakridge, Vancouver (1981–2010)
Month	Jan	Feb	Mar	Apr	May	Jun	Jul	Aug	Sep	Oct	Nov	Dec	Year
Average precipitation mm (inches)	222.7 (8.77)	111.4 (4.39)	125.0 (4.92)	101.7 (4.00)	75.3 (2.96)	67.8 (2.67)	42.6 (1.68)	48.4 (1.91)	59.1 (2.33)	156.8 (6.17)	238.5 (9.39)	207.3 (8.16)	1,456.6 (57.35)
Average rainfall mm (inches)	207.0 (8.15)	106.8 (4.20)	122.5 (4.82)	101.7 (4.00)	75.1 (2.96)	67.8 (2.67)	42.6 (1.68)	48.4 (1.91)	59.1 (2.33)	156.7 (6.17)	233.5 (9.19)	190.9 (7.52)	1,412 (55.59)
Average snowfall cm (inches)	15.7 (6.2)	4.5 (1.8)	2.6 (1.0)	0.0 (0.0)	0.2 (0.1)	0.0 (0.0)	0.0 (0.0)	0.0 (0.0)	0.0 (0.0)	0.1 (0.0)	5.0 (2.0)	16.4 (6.5)	44.6 (17.6)
Average precipitation days (≥ 0.2 mm)	19.9	14.5	17.3	15.8	12.7	10.9	7.0	7.1	7.6	15.6	19.6	20.2	168.2
Average rainy days (≥ 0.2 mm)	18.4	13.9	16.9	15.8	12.7	10.9	7.0	7.1	7.6	15.6	19.1	18.8	163.7
Average snowy days (≥ 0.2 cm)	3.1	0.9	0.6	0.0	0.07	0.0	0.0	0.0	0.0	0.06	0.8	3.1	8.6
Source: Environment and Climate Change Canada

== Demographics ==
Panethnic groups in the Oakridge neighbourhood (2001–2016)
Panethnic group	2016		2006		2001	
Panethnic group	Pop.	%	Pop.	%	Pop.	%
East Asian (Note: Statistic includes total responses of "Chinese", "Korean", and "Japanese" under visible minority section on census.)	8,035	61.69%	8,175	65.22%	7,295	61.85%
European (Note: Statistic includes all persons that did not make up part of a visible minority or an indigenous identity.)	3,115	23.92%	3,190	25.45%	3,660	31.03%
South Asian	685	5.26%	370	2.95%	370	3.14%
Southeast Asian (Note: Statistic includes total responses of "Filipino" and "Southeast Asian" under visible minority section on census.)	465	3.57%	290	2.31%	250	2.12%
Middle Eastern (Note: Statistic includes total responses of "West Asian" and "Arab" under visible minority section on census.)	170	1.31%	200	1.6%	205	1.74%
Latin American	95	0.73%	45	0.36%	0	0%
Indigenous	90	0.69%	35	0.28%	0	0%
African	45	0.35%	75	0.6%	35	0.3%
Other/Multiracial (Note: Statistic includes total responses of "Visible minority, n.i.e." and "Multiple visible minorities" under visible minority section on census.)	325	2.5%	145	1.16%	75	0.64%
Total responses	13,025	99.96%	12,535	98.51%	11,795	99.08%
Total population	13,030	100%	12,725	100%	11,905	100%
Note: Totals greater than 100% due to multiple origin responses

== Features ==
Oakridge is a developing community, characterized by ongoing growth and changing residential makeup. The neighborhood is anchored by Oakridge Park, which opened in May 2026 at the site of the former Oakridge Centre. Langara College, a public degree-granting college, is also located in the area at West 49th Avenue.

Development at Oakridge also includes the construction of the Canada Line along Cambie Street, which was completed in August 2009. Two stations, Oakridge – 41st Avenue Station and Langara – 49th Avenue Station, are located within Oakridge.
