= Marine Drive station =

Metro Vancouver SkyTrain station

Marine Drive
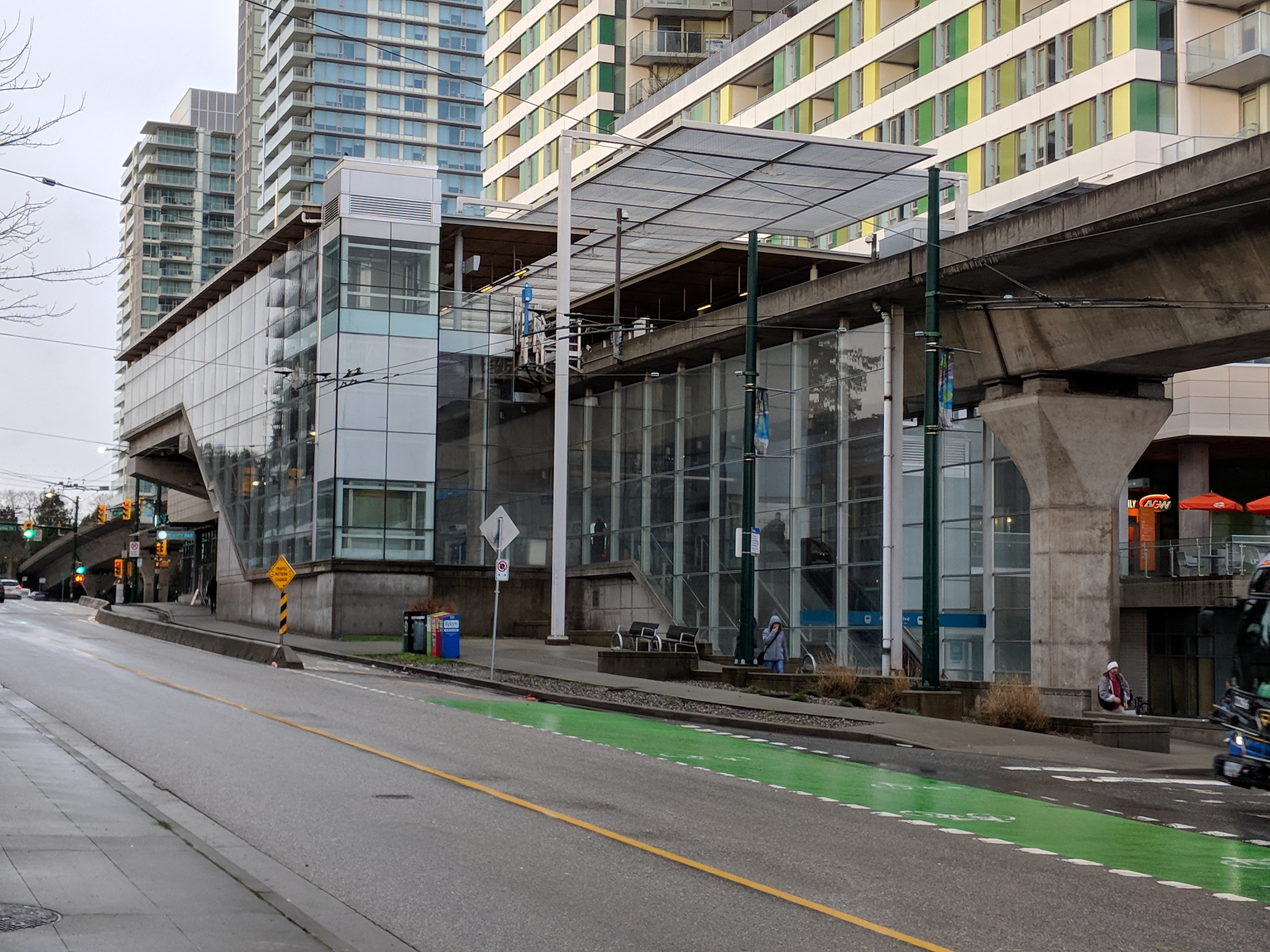

General information
- Location: 8430 Cambie Street, Vancouver
- Coordinates: 49°12′35″N 123°7′1″W
- System: SkyTrain station
- Owner: TransLink
- Platforms: Side platforms
- Tracks: 2

Construction
- Structure type: Elevated
- Accessible: yes

Other information
- Station code: MD
- Fare zone: 1

History
- Opened: August 17, 2009

Passengers
- 2025: 3,331,000 ▼2.3%
- Rank: 18 of 54

Services
Preceding station	TransLink	Following station
Langara–49th Avenue towards Waterfront	Canada Line	Bridgeport towards Richmond–Brighouse or YVR–Airport
Location

Marine Drive is an elevated station on the Canada Line of Metro Vancouver's SkyTrain rapid transit system. The station is located at the intersection of Cambie Street and SW Marine Drive in Vancouver, British Columbia.

== Location ==
The station is located on the southeast corner of the intersection of Southwest Marine Drive and Cambie Street. It serves the residential areas of Marpole and the Vancouver South Slope. The area surrounding the station includes the Marine Gateway retail hub and a movie theatre.

Marine Drive station is the only Canada Line station in the City of Vancouver with above-ground station platforms. Near 64th Avenue, just a few blocks north of the station, the line transitions to a cut-and-cover tunnel and remains underground all the way to the northern terminus at Waterfront station. South of Marine Drive station, the line crosses the Fraser River on the North Arm Bridge, a purpose-built bridge similar to the SkyBridge for the Expo Line.

== Services ==
The trolleybuses running along Main Street (#3), Granville Street (#10) and Oak Street (#17)—as well as the former trolleybus route on Cambie Street (#15)—have their southern termini located at a bus exchange at Marine Drive station, enabling easy transfers for passengers traveling between Vancouver, Richmond, and the Vancouver International Airport. In addition, passengers can also connect to the #100 bus, which runs along Marine Drive.

=== Bus routes ===
The following bus routes can be found in close proximity to Marine Drive station:

- 3 Downtown (via Main Street)
- 10 Downtown (via Granville Street)
- 15 Olympic Village Station (via Cambie Street, then continues downtown as #50 Waterfront Station)
- 17 Downtown (via Oak Street)
- 80 River District (via Marine Drive; peak hours only)
- 100 Marpole Loop
- 100 22nd Street Station
- N8 Downtown
- N15 Downtown
- N20 Downtown
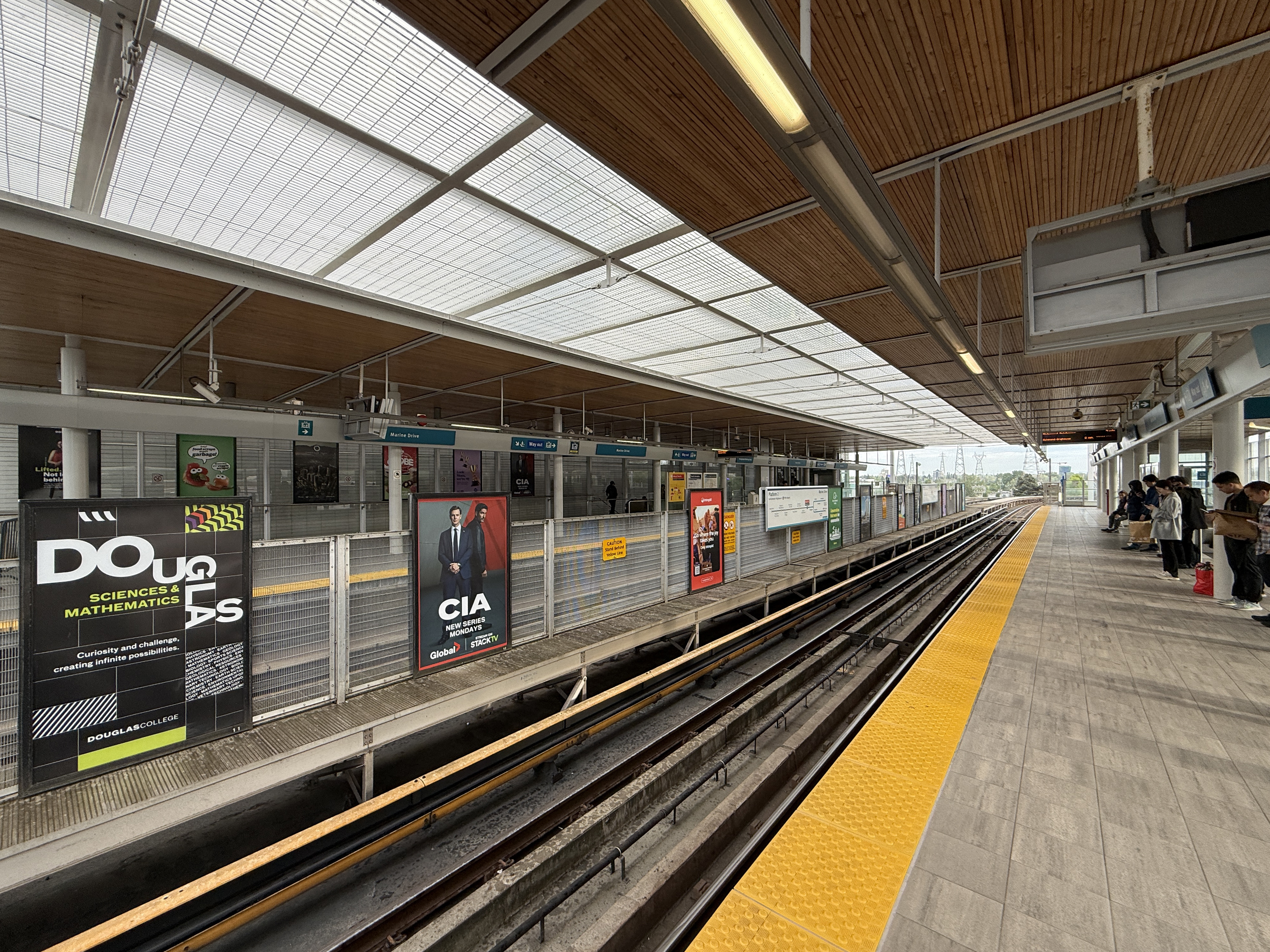
Platform

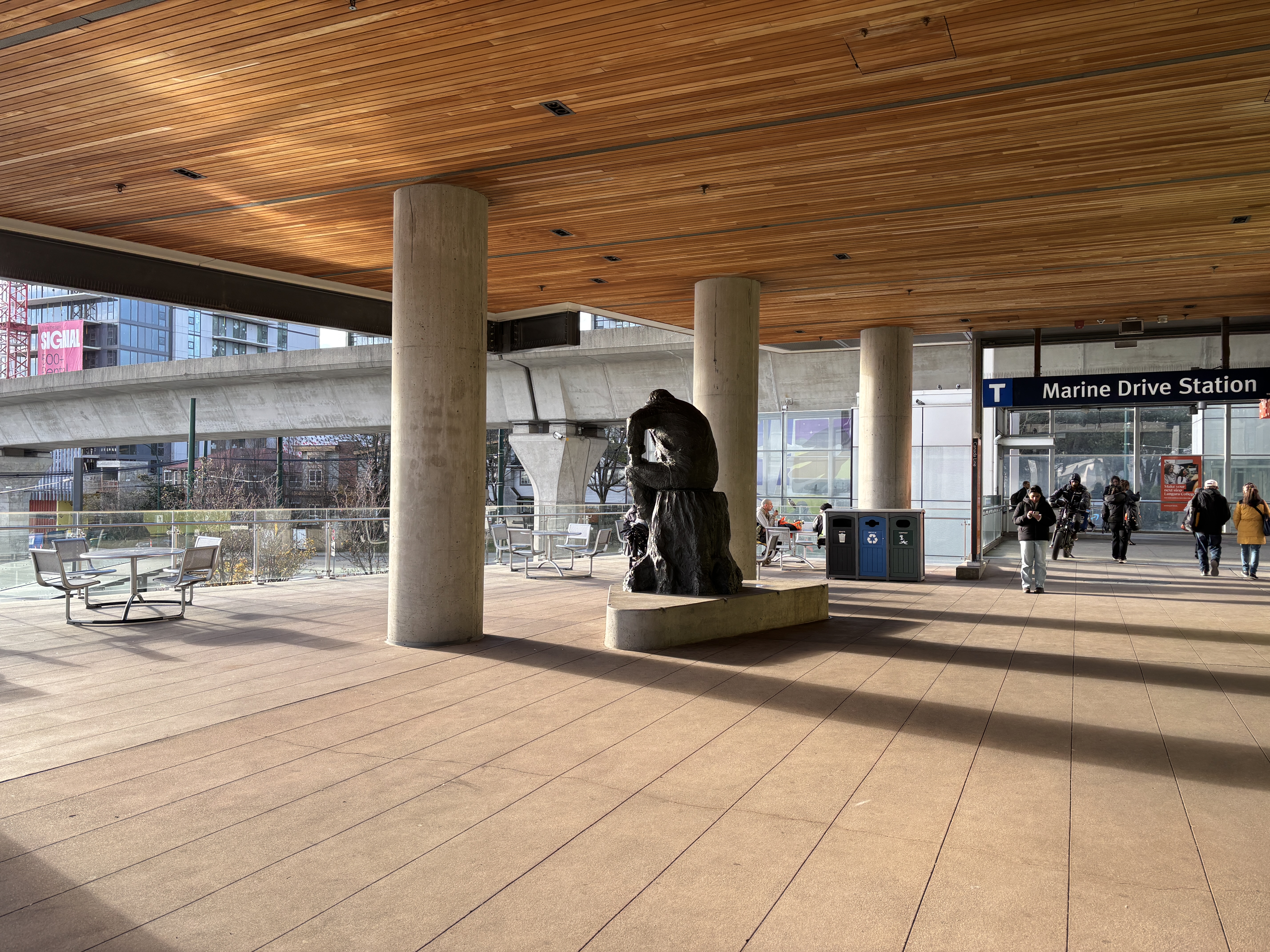
Podium level entrance

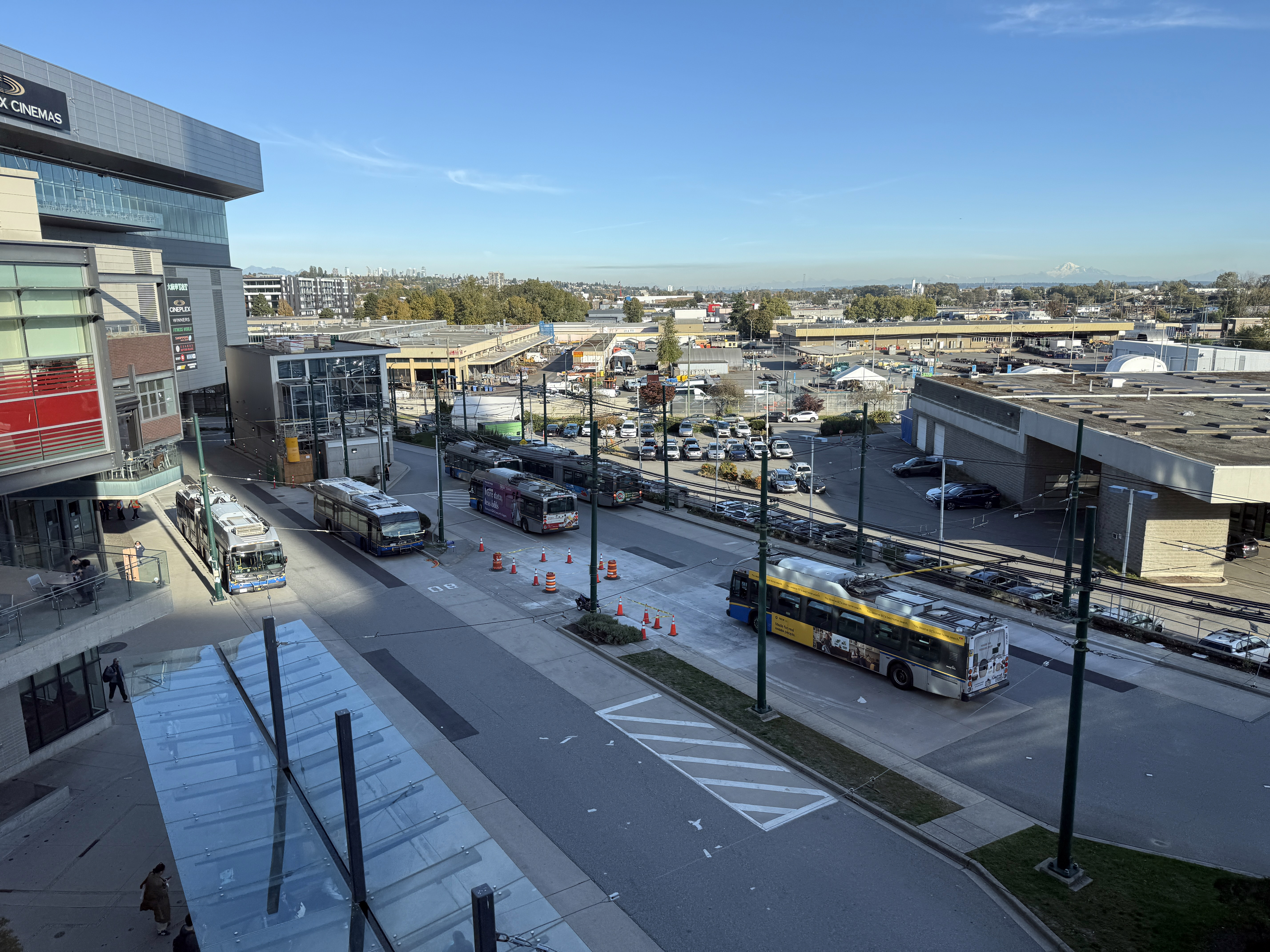
Bus stop
