= Langara–49th Avenue station =

Metro Vancouver SkyTrain station

Langara–49th Avenue
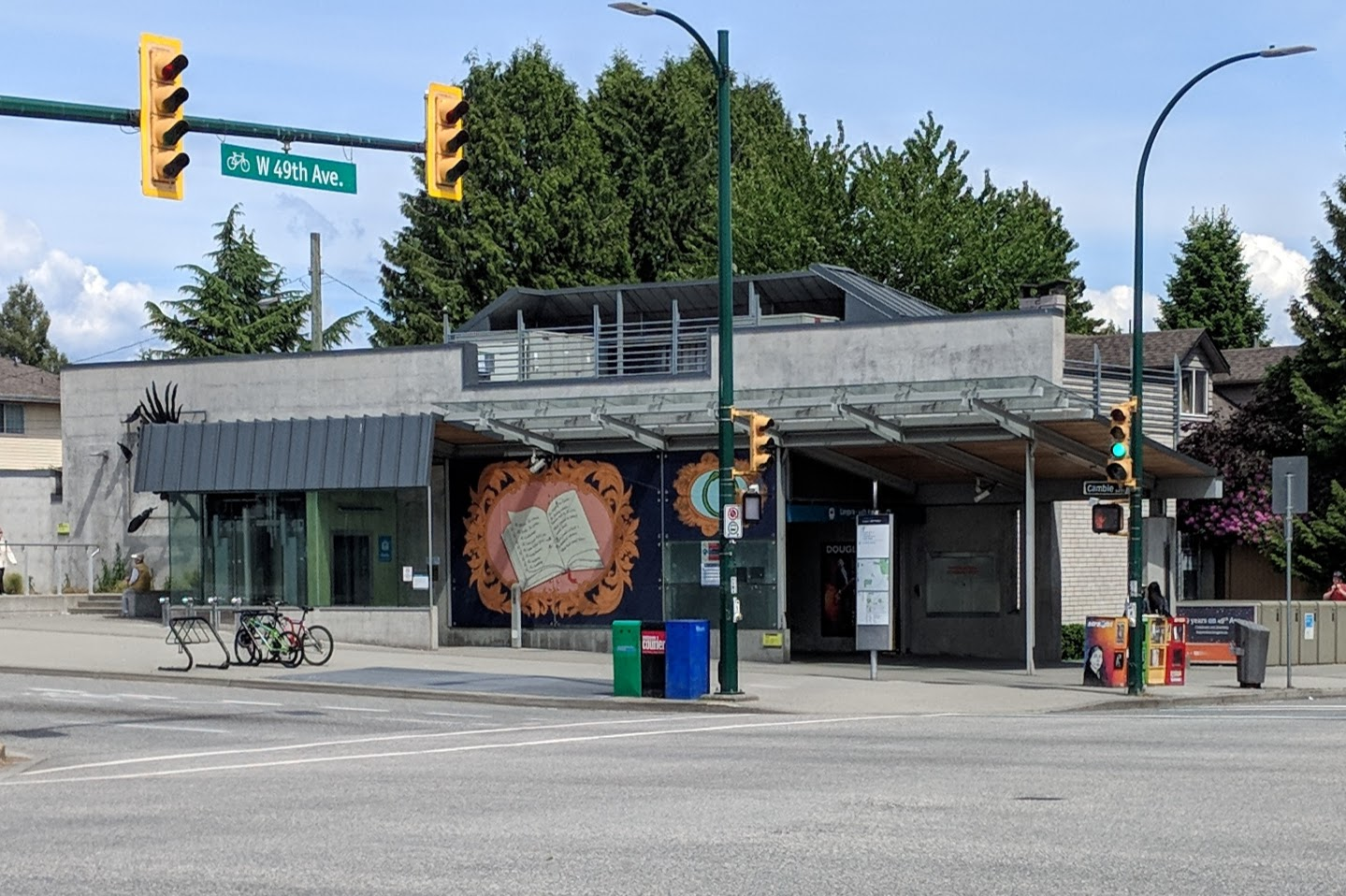
- Langara–49th Avenue station entrance in 2019

General information
- Location: 6488 Cambie Street, Vancouver
- Coordinates: 49°13′35″N 123°6′58″W
- System: SkyTrain station
- Owner: TransLink
- Platforms: Side platforms
- Tracks: 2

Construction
- Structure type: Subway
- Accessible: yes
- Architect: VIA Architecture

Other information
- Station code: LG
- Fare zone: 1

History
- Opened: August 17, 2009

Passengers
- 2025: 2,497,000 ▼0.4%
- Rank: 23 of 54

Services
Preceding station	TransLink	Following station
Oakridge–41st Avenue towards Waterfront	Canada Line	Marine Drive towards Richmond–Brighouse or YVR–Airport
Location

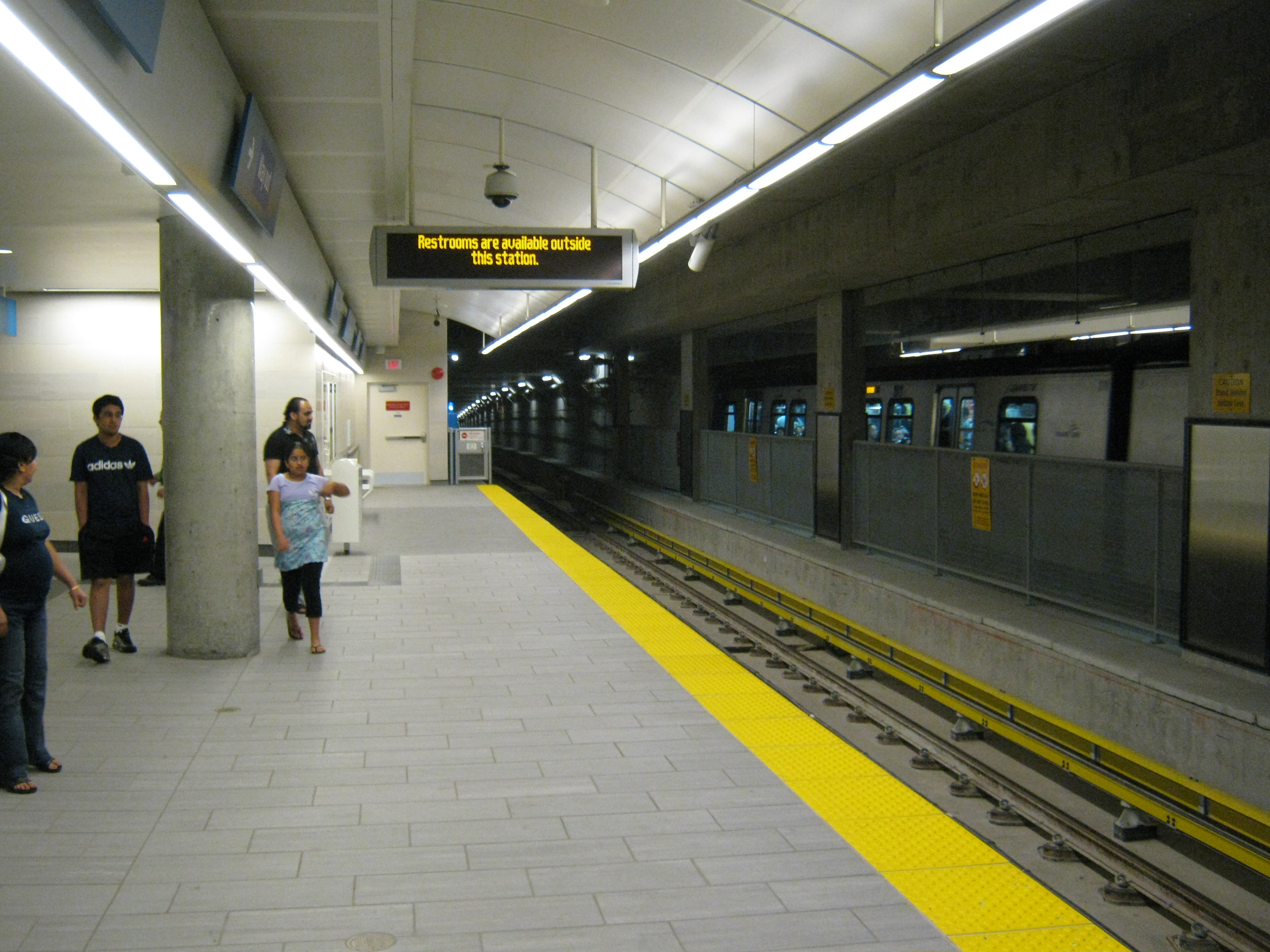
Langara–49th Avenue platform

Langara–49th Avenue is an underground station on the Canada Line of Metro Vancouver's SkyTrain rapid transit system. It is located at the intersection of West 49th Avenue and Cambie Street in Vancouver, British Columbia, Canada. The station serves the southern portion of the Oakridge neighbourhood, primarily the Langara community that surrounds the station, and is within walking distance of Langara College and the Langara Golf Course.

== History ==
Langara–49th Avenue station was opened in 2009 along with the rest of the Canada Line and was designed by the architecture firm VIA Architecture. The station is named for nearby 49th Avenue and the Langara community, which in turn is named after the Spanish admiral Juan de Lángara.

== Services ==
Passengers exiting from this station are able to transfer to the #15 bus, which provides local surface service on Cambie Street, and the #49 bus, which travels east to Metrotown station and west to the University of British Columbia.

== Station information ==
=== Entrances ===
Langara–49th Avenue station is served by a single entrance located at the northeast corner of Cambie Street and 49th Avenue.

=== Transit connections ===
The following bus routes can be found in close proximity to Langara–49th Avenue:

Bay	Location	Routes
1	Cambie Street; Northbound	15 Olympic Village Station; N15 Downtown (NightBus service)
2	49th Avenue; Westbound	49 UBC
3	49th Avenue; Eastbound	49 Metrotown Station
4	Cambie Street; Southbound	15 Cambie; N15 Cambie (NightBus service)
