= Oakridge–41st Avenue station =

Metro Vancouver SkyTrain station

Oakridge–41st Avenue
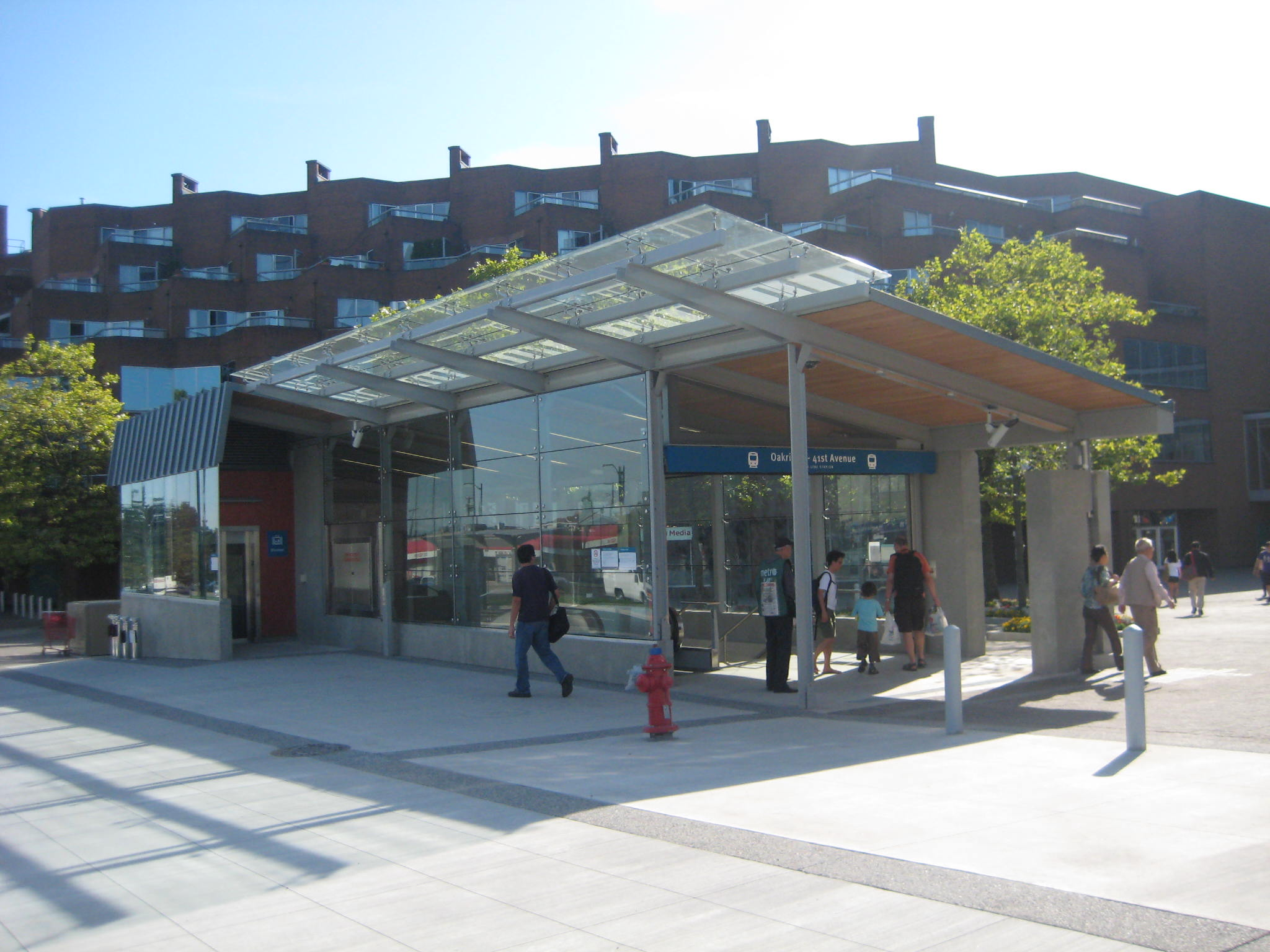
- Oakridge–41st Avenue station entrance in 2009

General information
- Location: 510 West 41st Avenue, Vancouver
- Coordinates: 49°13′59″N 123°7′0″W
- System: SkyTrain station
- Owner: TransLink
- Platforms: Side platforms
- Tracks: 2
- Connections: R4 41st Ave

Construction
- Structure type: Subway
- Depth: 6 m (20 ft)
- Accessible: yes
- Architect: VIA Architecture

Other information
- Station code: OK
- Fare zone: 1

History
- Opened: August 17, 2009

Passengers
- 2025: 2,227,000 ▼4.5%
- Rank: 26 of 54

Services
Preceding station	TransLink	Following station
King Edward towards Waterfront	Canada Line	Langara–49th Avenue towards Richmond–Brighouse or YVR–Airport
Location

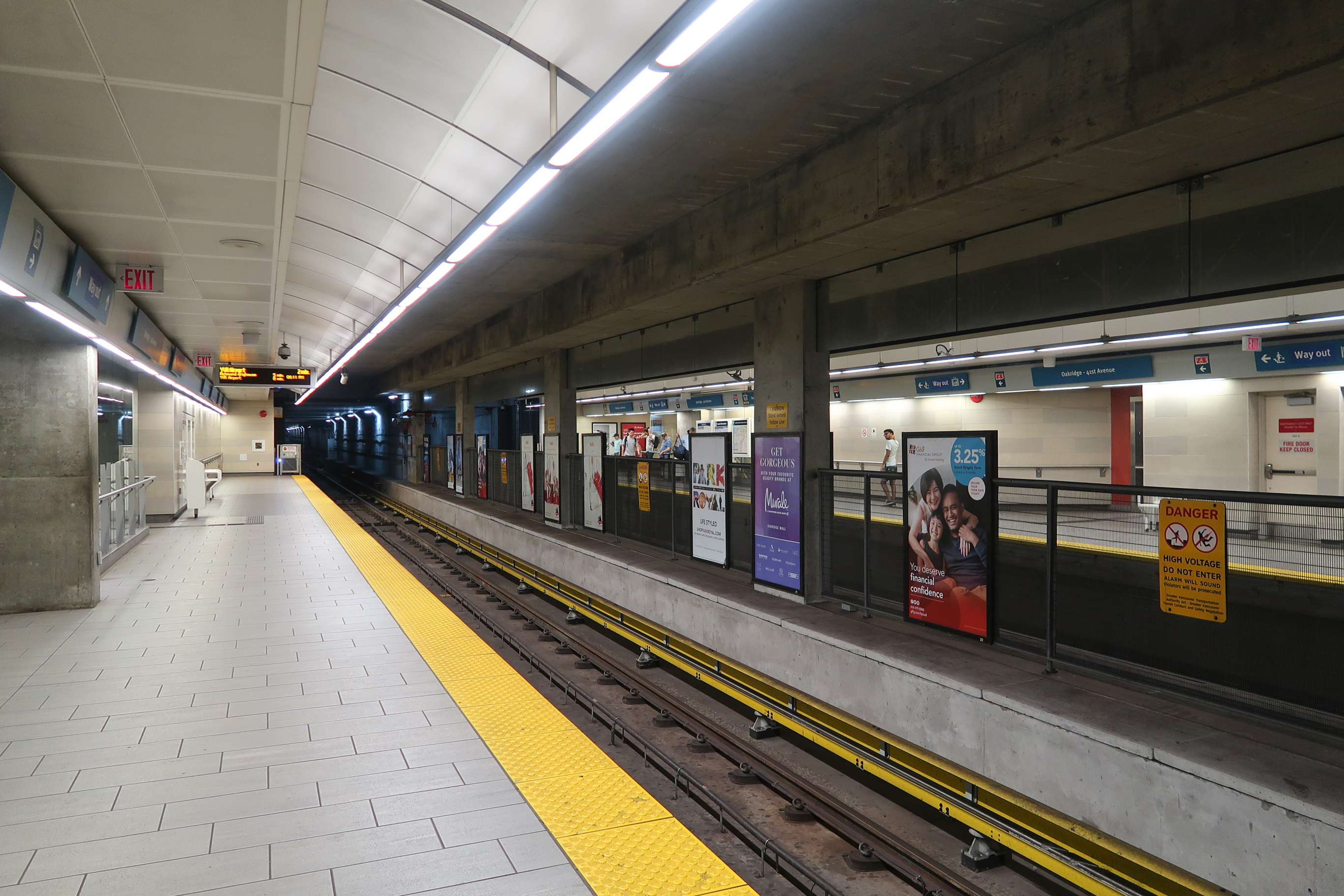
Station platform

Oakridge–41st Avenue is an underground station on the Canada Line of Metro Vancouver's SkyTrain rapid transit system. It is located at the intersection of West 41st Avenue and Cambie Street in Vancouver, British Columbia, Canada.

It serves the Oakridge area—consisting of a residential neighbourhood, streetside stores along Cambie Street, and the Oakridge Centre complex—and is within walking distance of Queen Elizabeth Park. The station is located 6 metres (20 ft) underground.

== History ==
Oakridge–41st Avenue station was opened in 2009 along with the rest of the Canada Line and was designed by the architecture firm VIA Architecture.

== Station information ==
=== Entrances ===
The station entrance is located on the southwest corner of the intersection of West 41st Avenue and Cambie Street, adjacent to the entrance to the Oakridge Centre shopping mall.

=== Transit connections ===
The following bus routes can be found in close proximity to Oakridge–41st Avenue:

Bay	Location	Route
1	Cambie Street; Southbound	15 Cambie; N15 Cambie (NightBus service)
2	41st Avenue; Eastbound	R4 41st Ave to Joyce Station
3	41st Avenue; Eastbound	41 Joyce Station
4	41st Avenue; Westbound	R4 41st Ave to UBC
5	41st Avenue; Westbound	41 Crown
6	Cambie Street; Northbound	15 Olympic Village Station; N15 Downtown (NightBus service)
