= Capstan station =

Metro Vancouver SkyTrain station

Capstan
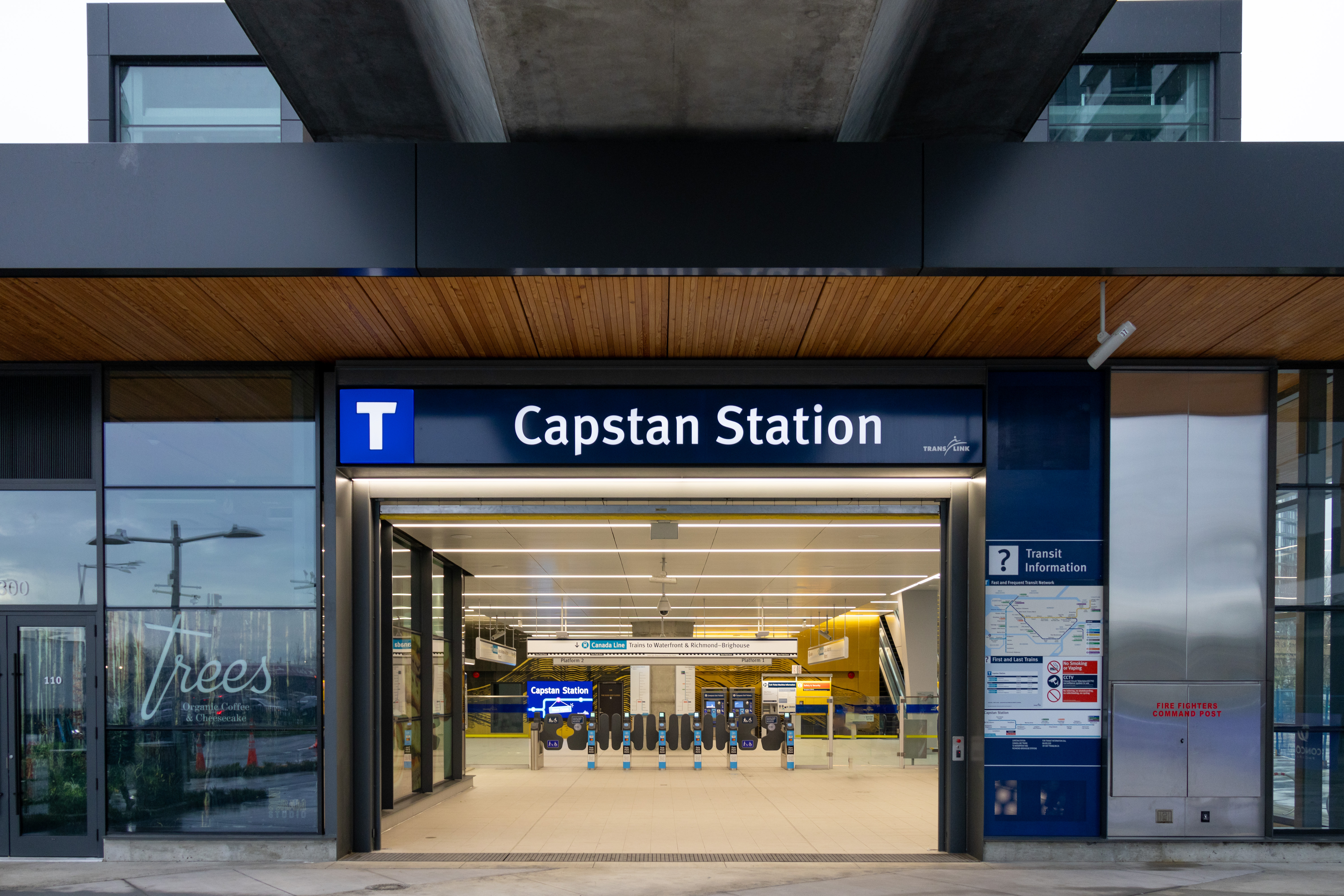
- Capstan station entrance on opening day

General information
- Location: 3300 No. 3 Road, Richmond
- Coordinates: 49.189254°N 123.131677°W
- System: SkyTrain station
- Owner: TransLink
- Platforms: Side platforms
- Tracks: 2

Construction
- Structure type: Elevated
- Accessible: Yes

Other information
- Station code: CP
- Fare zone: 2

History
- Opened: December 20, 2024; 20 months ago

Passengers
- 2025: 589,000 0%
- Rank: 51 of 54

Services
Preceding station	TransLink	Following station
Bridgeport towards Waterfront	Canada Line Richmond branch	Aberdeen towards Richmond–Brighouse
Location

Capstan is an elevated station on the Canada Line of Metro Vancouver's SkyTrain rapid transit system. It is located at the intersection of No. 3 Road and McMyn Way, one block north of Capstan Way in Richmond, British Columbia, Canada, and is the first infill station on the Canada Line. It opened on December 20, 2024.

== History ==
A station at Capstan Way in Richmond was originally planned to open shortly after the rest of the Canada Line but plans to construct it were cancelled in March 2009. Pinnacle International and Concord Pacific, the developers of the Sun Tech City project, could not fund the $25 million required to build the station. The developers could only offer $15 million up front, but this sum was not accepted by TransLink and the City of Richmond.

In May 2012, the City of Richmond made an agreement with TransLink and the developers to fund the project. The developers were to pay a fee of just over $8,500 per unit, with the specific amount adjusted in October to account for inflation. At the time, it was thought it would take approximately 15 years to amass the required funds. By September 2017, based on development permit applications, the full $27.8 million could be collected by mid-2018, nine years earlier than expected.

In November 2017, the City of Richmond released $3.5 million to TransLink to cover the costs of designing the station. By May 2019, $32 million had been raised, exceeding the required $27.8 million, which had been reached in November 2018. By December 2019, the station was still in the detailed design stage.

=== Construction ===
Construction of the station began on September 2, 2021, and required various service reductions and periods of single tracking on the Richmond branch of the Canada Line across several months.

Initially the completion of the station was projected for mid-2022; a nearby construction conflict and internal changes at InTransitBC, the private operator of the Canada Line, later pushed this date to March 2023. The opening date was subsequently pushed back to the first quarter of 2024 due to supply chain issues. In January 2024, TransLink announced the opening would be delayed to mid-2024 due to "work sequencing and worksite conditions".

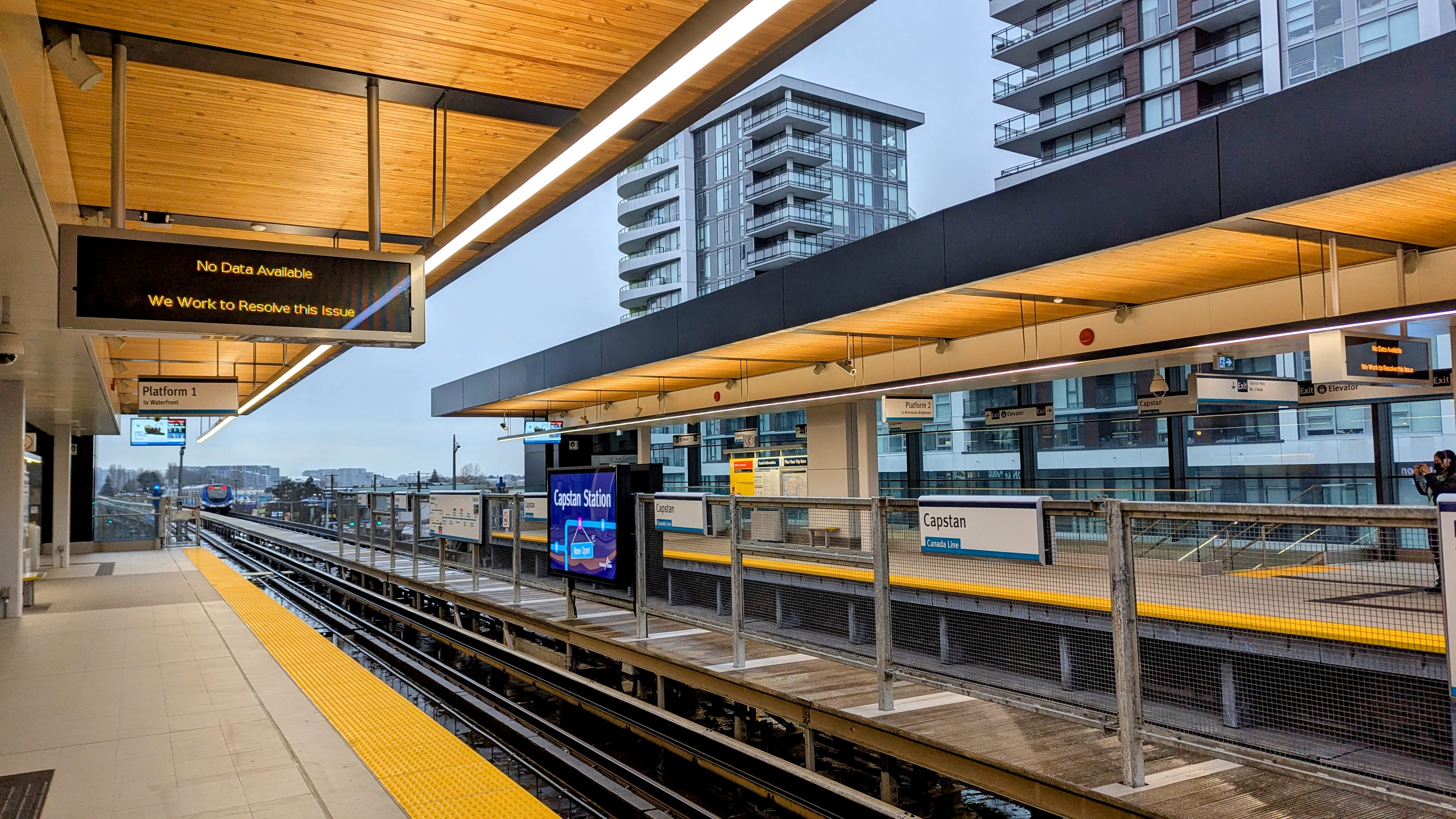
Capstan station platform 1 on station's opening day (December 20, 2024)

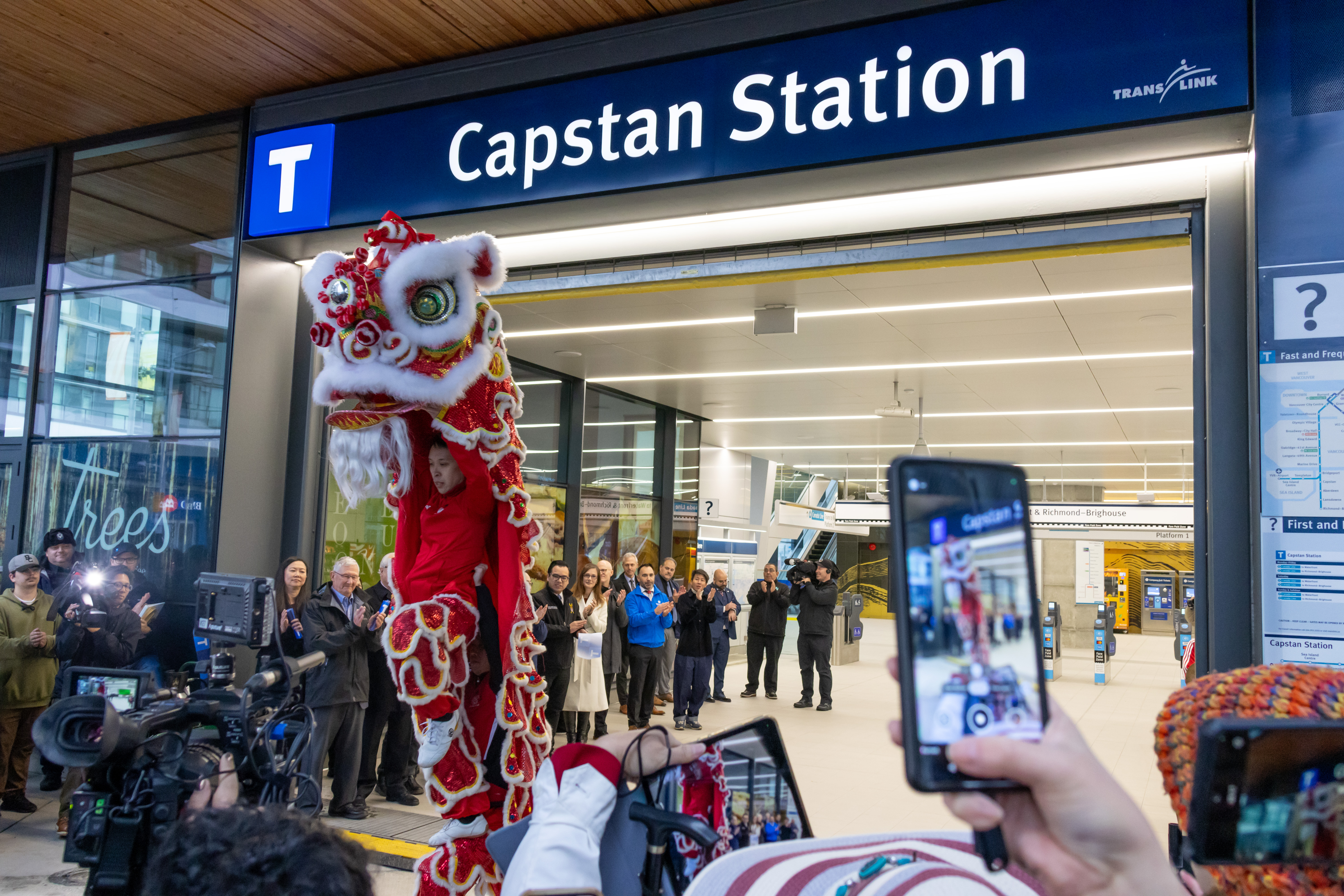
Lion dance in front of entrance on station's opening day (December 20, 2024)

Capstan station opened for passenger service on December 20, 2024.

== Station information ==
=== Transit connections ===
The following bus routes are located nearby:

Bay	Location	Routes
1	No. 3 Road; Northbound	403 Bridgeport Station; N10 Downtown NightBus
2	No. 3 Road; Southbound	403 Three Road; 407 Gilbert; N10 Brighouse Station NightBus
3	Capstan Way; Westbound	407 Bridgeport
4	Capstan Way; Eastbound	407 Gilbert
5	Capstan Way; Westbound	HandyDART
