= Canada Line =

Rapid transit line in Metro Vancouver, Canada

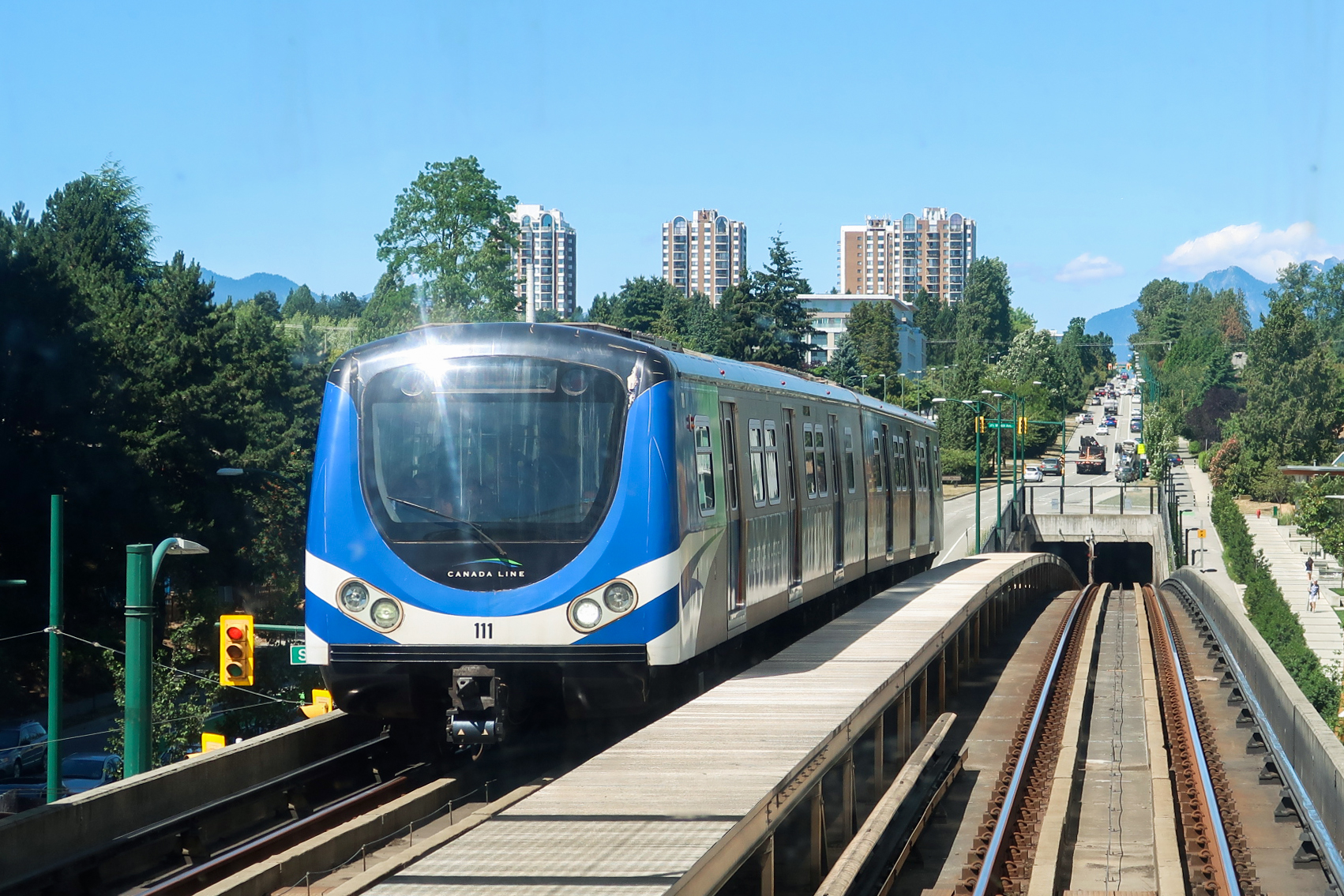
- Canada Line train pulling into Marine Drive station

Overview
- Owner: TransLink, InTransitBC
- Locale: Metro Vancouver, British Columbia
- Termini: Waterfront; YVR–Airport & Richmond–Brighouse
- Stations: 17
- Website: thecanadaline.com

Service
- Type: Rapid transit
- System: SkyTrain
- Operator: ProTrans BC
- Rolling stock: Rotem EMU, 2 cars per trainset
- Daily ridership: 120,000 (2023)

History
- Opened: August 17, 2009; 17 years ago

Technical
- Line length: 19.2 km (11.9 mi)
- Num of tracks: 2
- Track gauge: 1,435 mm (4 ft 8 1/2 in) standard gauge
- Electrification: Third rail, 750 V DC
- Operating speed: 80 km/h (50 mph)
Route map
Canada Line highlighted in teal

The Canada Line is a rapid transit line in Greater Vancouver, British Columbia, Canada, that is part of the SkyTrain system. The line is owned by TransLink and InTransitBC and is operated by ProTrans BC. Coloured turquoise on route maps, it operates as an airport rail link between Vancouver, Richmond, and the Vancouver International Airport (YVR). The line comprises 17 stations and 19.2 kilometres (11.9 mi) of track; the main line runs from Vancouver to Richmond while a 4-kilometre (2.5 mi) spur line from Bridgeport station connects to the airport. It opened on August 17, 2009, ahead of the 2010 Winter Olympics.

The Canada Line was anticipated to have 100,000 boardings per day in 2013 and 142,000 boardings per day by 2021, but it has consistently exceeded early targets. Ridership has grown steadily since opening day, with average ridership of 83,000 per day in September 2009, 105,000 per day in March 2010, and over 136,000 passengers per weekday in June 2011. During the 17 days of the 2010 Winter Olympics, the line carried an average of 228,190 passengers per day.

Governance of the project was through Canada Line Rapid Transit Inc. (CLCO), formerly RAV Project Management Ltd. (RAVCO), a reflection of the original "Richmond–Airport–Vancouver" name). The line was built by SNC-Lavalin, and InTransitBC is under contract with TransLink to manage the line for its first 35 years, until 2040. The Canada Line is operationally independent from British Columbia Rapid Transit Company, which operates SkyTrain's Expo and Millennium lines but is considered a part of the SkyTrain network. Like the other two SkyTrain lines in Metro Vancouver, it is also light metro rapid transit, using fully automated trains on grade-separated guideways. However, the trains are powered by conventional motors with third rail electrical pickup rather than the linear induction system used on the other SkyTrain lines.

== Route ==
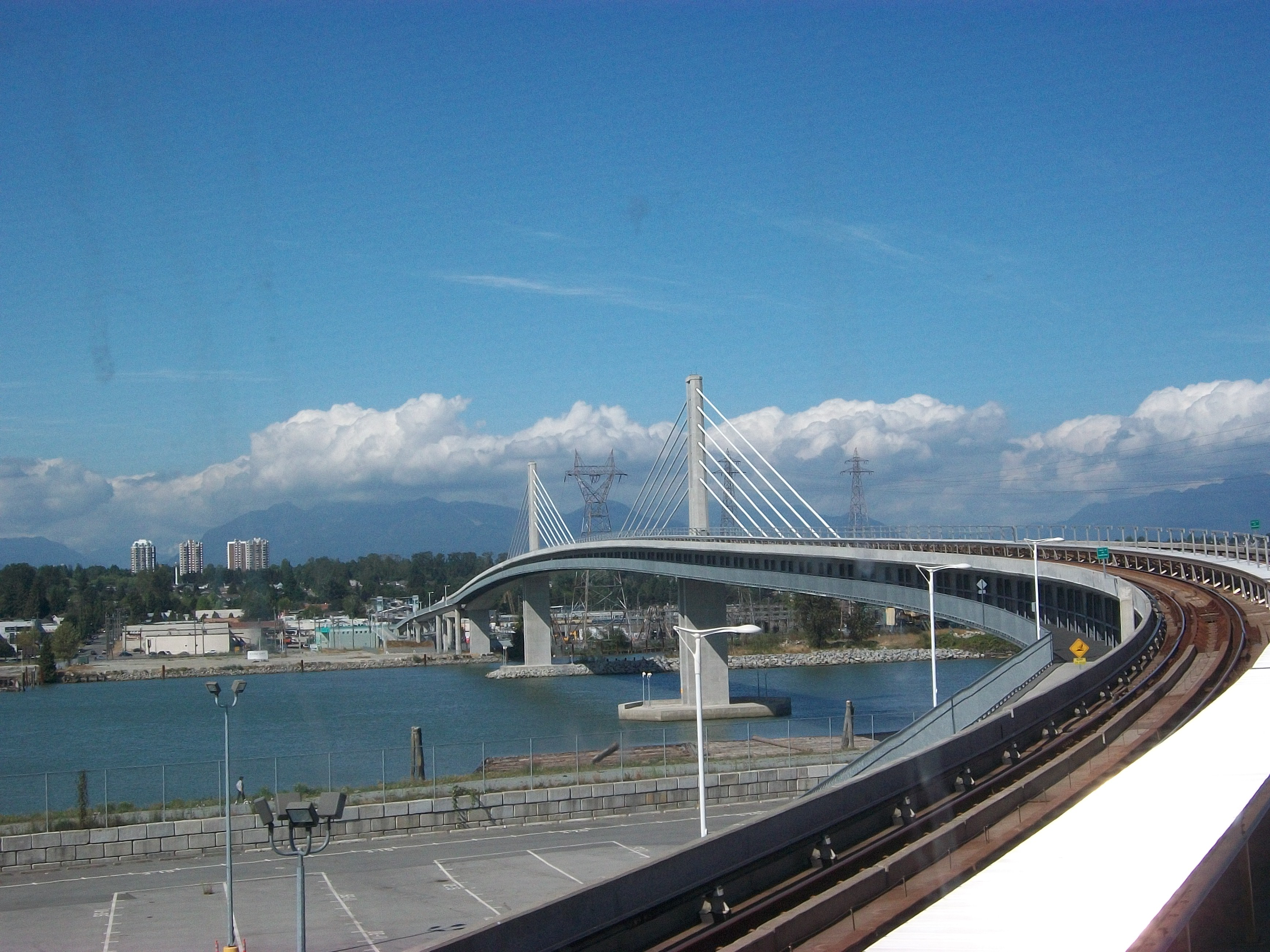
Canada Line bridge over the Fraser River

The Canada Line begins in Downtown Vancouver at Waterfront station (0.0 km [0 mi]) in a cut-and-cover subway tunnel beneath Granville Street. It quickly goes into twin-bored tunnels, heading southwest beneath Granville Street, then curving southeast to follow Davie Street through Yaletown. The tunnels then dive deeper to pass below False Creek before rising back up to Olympic Village station (2.7 km [1.7 mi]). There, the line transitions back to a cut-and-cover tunnel (which is noted by the tunnel changing from a circular to a square shape), heading south under Cambie Street. This section has some portions where the two sets of tracks are stacked vertically. The line emerges from the ground just south of 64th Avenue, climbing to an elevated guideway.

The line continues elevated across the North Arm Bridge over the North Arm of the Fraser River, leaving Vancouver and entering Richmond. Just beyond Bridgeport station (11.1 km [6.9 mi]) at a flying junction, the line splits, with the Richmond branch heading south on elevated tracks along No. 3 Road and terminating at Richmond–Brighouse station (14.5 km [9.0 mi]). The airport branch turns west and crosses the Middle Arm Bridge over the Middle Arm of the Fraser River, connecting to stations on Sea Island and terminating at YVR–Airport station (15.0 km [9.3 mi]). Portions of the airport branch are at grade in order to accommodate a future elevated taxiway for aircraft over the line. Both branches narrow to a single track as they approach their respective terminus stations. Just before Bridgeport station is the Operations and Maintenance Centre (OMC) facility, which houses Canada Line trains that are not in use.

== Stations ==
Station construction was designed as a two-stage process. Sixteen original stations opened at the same time as the line did. Three additional stations are planned, and may be built in the future. The stations are listed below.

Each Canada Line station is slightly different in appearance, designed to blend in with the surrounding neighbourhood. For example, Langara–49th Avenue station is designed to fit into the area's low-density residential neighbourhood.

The five busiest stations have platforms 50 metres (160 ft) long, while the rest of the stations have 40-metre (130 ft) platforms that can be easily extended to 50 metres. The termini at YVR–Airport and Richmond–Brighouse stations are single-tracked, whereas the Waterfront station terminus is double-tracked. The double-tracking is necessary to accommodate the three-minute headways between trains on the Waterfront–Bridgeport portion of the line. King Edward station is the only station with a stacked configuration, and Broadway–City Hall station is the only station with a double-height ceiling over the platforms. Vancouver City Centre station is linked to Pacific Centre mall and Vancouver Centre Mall in addition to having street-level access. All direct transfers to the Expo and Millennium Lines must be made at Waterfront station; there is no direct connection from Vancouver City Centre station to Granville station. However, it is possible to transfer between those two stations via a short walk through Pacific Centre or Vancouver Centre Mall.

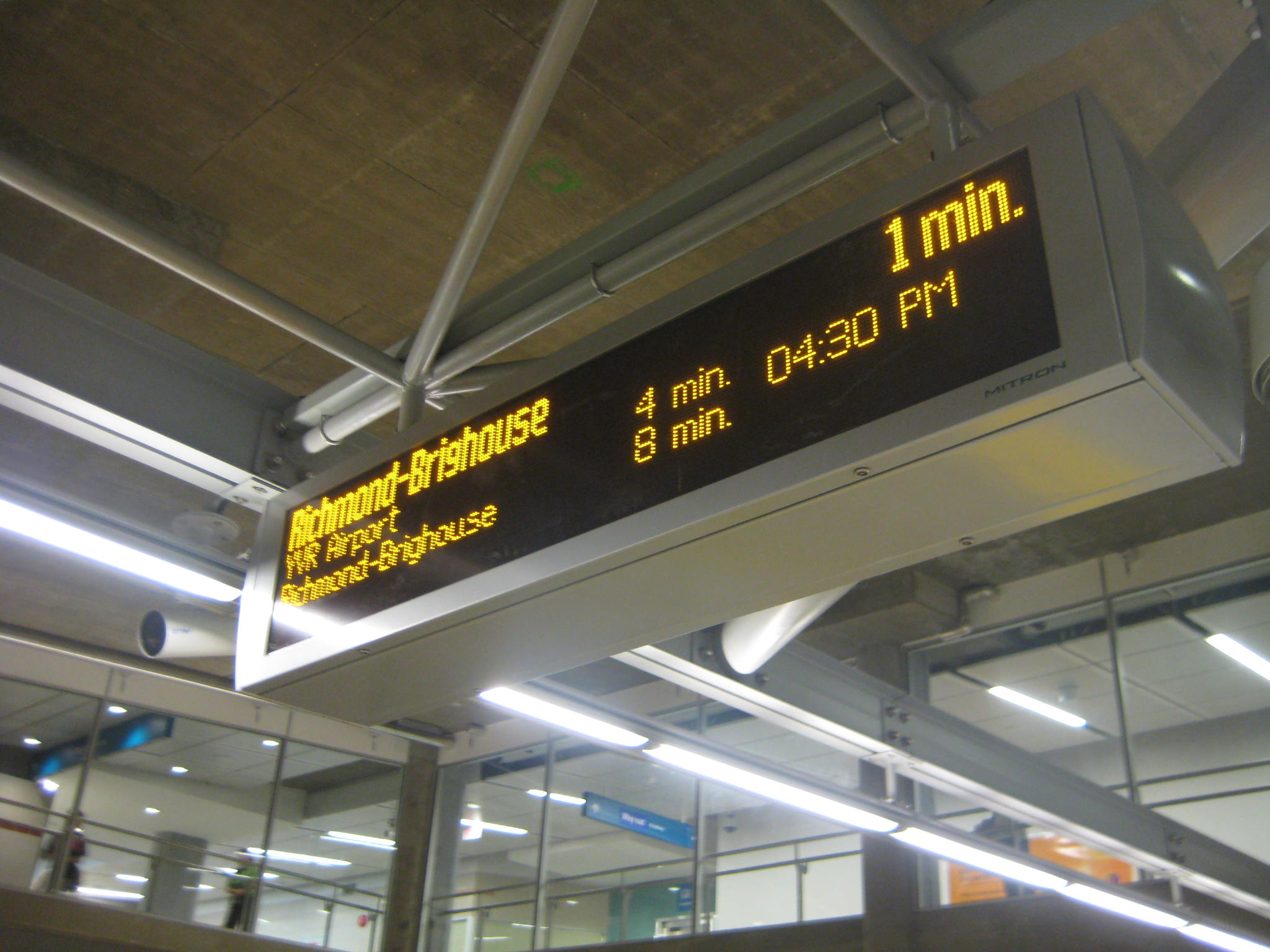
Real-time information is provided on every station platform.

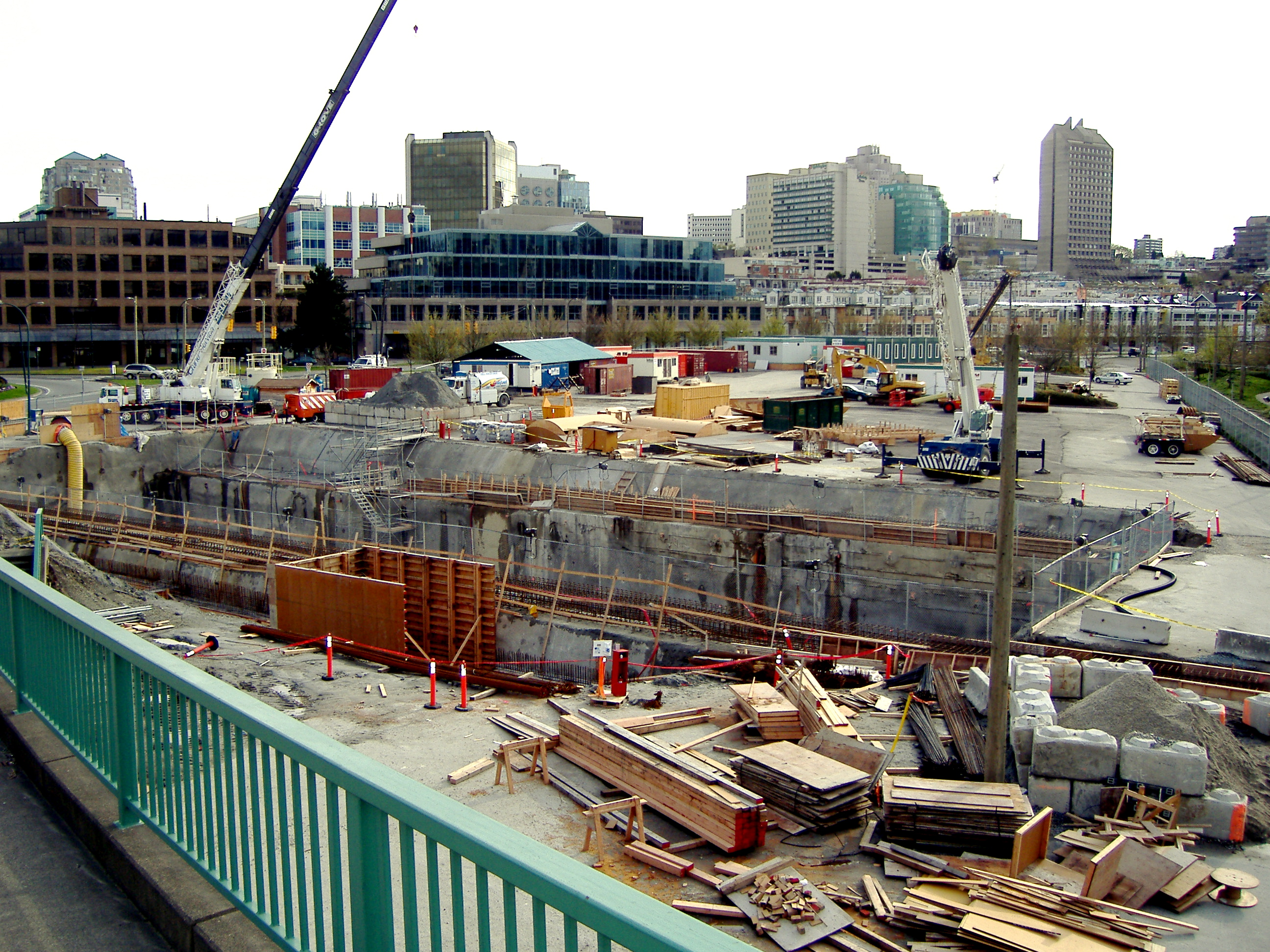
Construction taking place on the south shore of False Creek, at the site of Olympic Village station, April 14, 2006

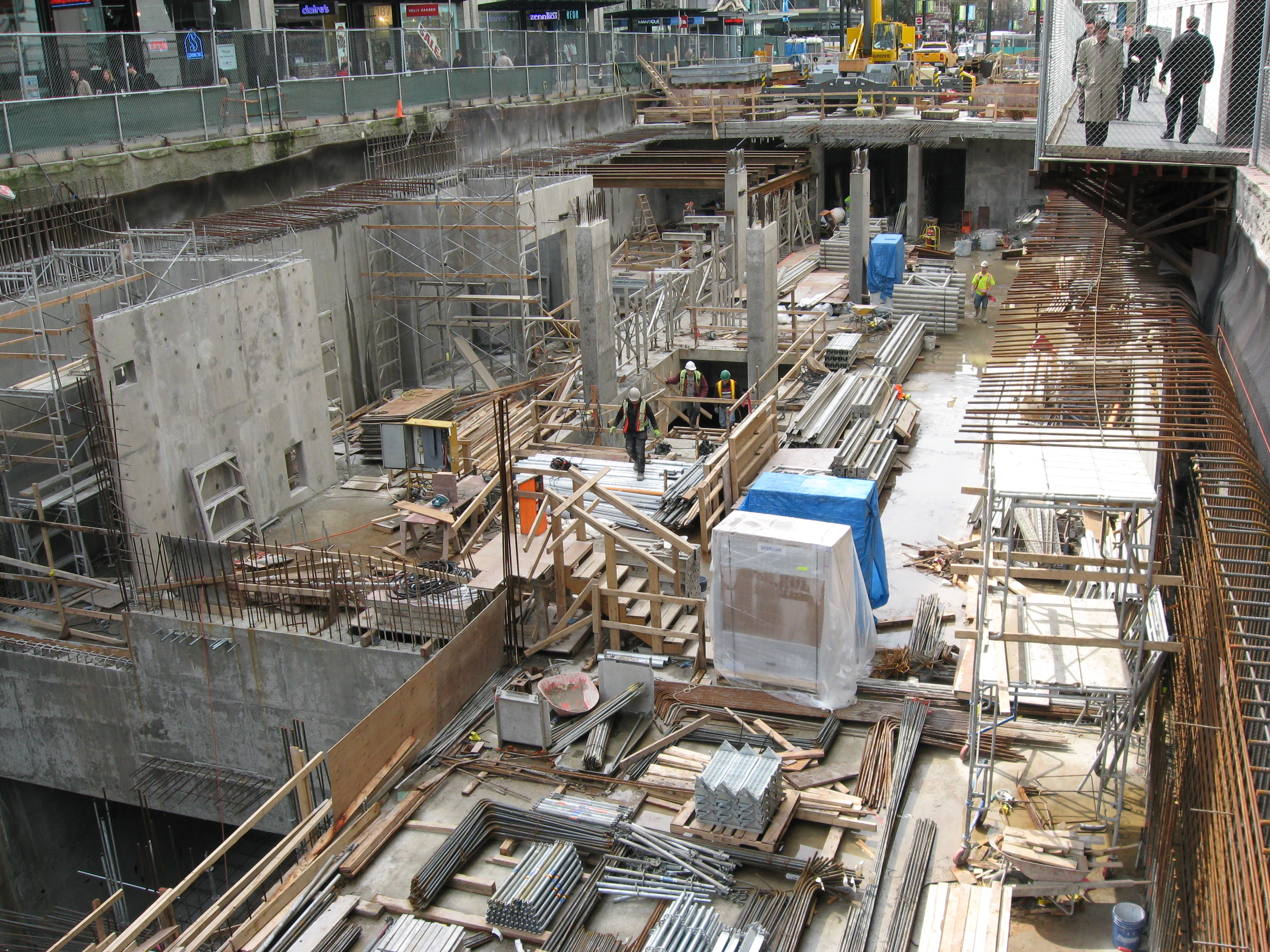
Construction of Vancouver City Centre station, below Granville Street between Robson and Georgia, April 9, 2008

Stations were configured to allow for the future installation of fare gates, and received fare gates in 2013 as part of full implementation throughout all SkyTrain stations. Every station has an up escalator and an elevator, but only the three terminal stations have down escalators.

Until late 2019, six stations (Vancouver City Centre, Olympic Village, Broadway–City Hall, Marine Drive, Templeton, and YVR–Airport) were equipped with self-service flight check-in kiosks which allowed customers to check into their flights at Vancouver International Airport while at these stations.

Station	City	Connections	Location
Waterfront	Vancouver	SeaBus; Expo Line; West Coast Express; R5 RapidBus	Granville, between Pender and Hastings
Vancouver City Centre	Vancouver		Granville at Georgia
Yaletown–Roundhouse	Vancouver		Davie near Mainland
Olympic Village	Vancouver		Cambie at West 2nd Ave
Broadway–City Hall	Vancouver	99 B-Line	Cambie at West Broadway
King Edward	Vancouver		Cambie at King Edward
Oakridge–41st Avenue	Vancouver	R4 RapidBus	Cambie at West 41st; next to Oakridge Centre
Langara–49th Avenue	Vancouver		Cambie at West 49th; near Langara College
Marine Drive	Vancouver		Cambie at Marine
Bridgeport	Richmond		Major transit exchange for suburban buses; branches split; adjacent to River Rock Casino Resort
Richmond–Brighouse branch
Capstan	Richmond		No. 3, between Capstan and McMyn
Aberdeen	Richmond		No. 3 at Cambie; adjacent to Aberdeen Centre
Lansdowne	Richmond		No. 3 at Lansdowne; adjacent to Lansdowne Centre
Richmond–Brighouse	Richmond		No. 3 at Saba; adjacent to Richmond Centre
YVR–Airport branch
Templeton	Richmond		North of Grant McConachie Way; east of Templeton
Sea Island Centre	Richmond		Near Air Canada service centre
YVR–Airport	Richmond	YVR	Adjacent to Grant McConachie Way, attached by walkways to YVR Main Terminal

=== Additional stations ===
Provisions have been made to allow for the addition of the following infill stations in the future:

- 33rd Avenue (Cambie Street at West 33rd Avenue, next to Queen Elizabeth Park)
- 57th Avenue (Cambie Street at West 57th Avenue)
  The future of a 57th Avenue station (Cambie Street and West 57th Avenue) in Vancouver is uncertain. The original plan was that a station could be built, but subsequent documents and talk between TransLink and the City of Vancouver raised the possibility of it never happening. The station was part of the broad policy statement adopted in 2014 by city council for the redevelopment of the Pearson Dogwood lands, but in June 2017, Susan Haid, city assistant director of planning for Vancouver South, submitted a report to Vancouver council stating that "though it is desirable to achieve a future station at 57th Avenue there are a number of key challenges ... the station is not considered in regional transportation plans and is not considered a regional priority such as the Broadway Corridor line." Haid also added that, "Should the station not be attainable in the long-term future, the financial contribution towards a future station would be re-allocated to address the amenity priorities identified for Pearson Dogwood and those in and around the Cambie Corridor consistent with the respective public benefit strategies."
- YVR Terminal 3 (near YVR Terminal 3)
  The master plan for the Vancouver International Airport for 2027 indicates that this station would be built alongside the airport's proposed Northeast Terminal expansion.

== Transit connections ==
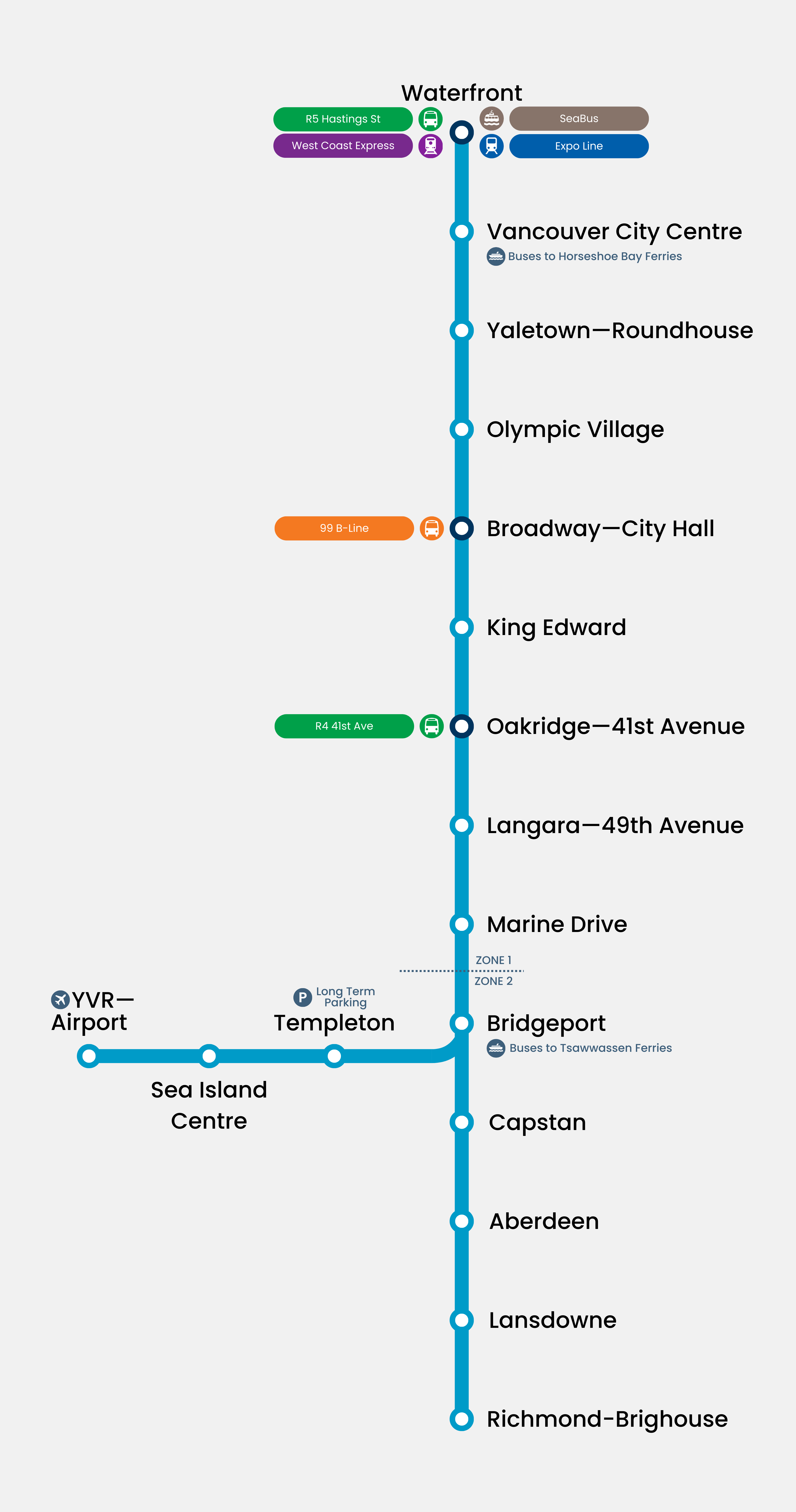
Map of the Canada Line as of January 2025

Many transit services connect with the Canada Line and form an important part of the service. With the opening of the line, most bus routes in Richmond, and connecting services from White Rock, Tsawwassen, and Ladner, doubled their service frequency. Waterfront station provides connections to the R5 Hastings St, Expo Line, West Coast Express, and SeaBus. Broadway–City Hall provides a connection to the 99 B-Line service.

There are currently only two routes serving Vancouver International Airport: the N10 NightBus, running parallel to the Canada Line along Granville Street, and route 412, running between Airport South and Bridgeport station. Riders on these bus routes are not subject to the YVR AddFare. The Airport Station exchange was downgraded to a regular bus stop on September 7, 2009, a few weeks after the opening of the line. Bus routes that used this loop were discontinued (as in the case of the 424 and the 98 B-Line), short-turned (as in the case of the 100, renamed 100 Marpole Loop), or redirected to Bridgeport station (as in the case of the 620, C90, and C92).

Work began in May 2021 to extend the Millennium Line from VCC–Clark station west along Broadway to the new Arbutus station, allowing for a transfer to the Canada Line at Broadway–City Hall station. As indicated in material presented by the City of Vancouver at public meetings in early 2006, this station was designed with such a future extension in mind. A "knock-out" panel was installed in the concourse that would facilitate construction of a connection between the station and a Broadway-corridor SkyTrain extension.

The Canada Line uses the same fare system as the rest of the transit system managed by TransLink, with two exceptions:

- The YVR AddFare, started in January 2010, is a surcharge that applies to some passengers leaving the airport and travelling eastbound to Bridgeport station and beyond. Passengers headed away from the airport must pay a $5 AddFare on top of the regular fare to leave the Sea Island stations unless they are travelling on a monthly pass; or a DayPass or a single-use Compass Ticket that was not purchased on Sea Island.
- Travel between the Sea Island stations is free to everyone. There is no additional fare for passengers travelling toward the airport. Such trips require a special Sea Island ticket that is free to obtain at any ticket machine at the Sea Island stations. These tickets are not valid for tapping out at other stations; an exit ticket is required for Sea Island ticketholders exiting at any station outside of Sea Island.

The Canada Line operates on a "Fare Paid Zone" system. Passengers are required by law to possess a valid fare when they are in Fare Paid Zones. Fare Paid Zones are clearly marked, and fares can be bought from Compass Vending Machines at all stations. Fare inspections are mostly conducted by the South Coast British Columbia Transportation Authority Police Service. Passengers who fail to pay the fare or do not have a valid fare may be fined $173 and/or removed from the station or train.

Canada Line attendants are the customer service staff for the Canada Line. They are easily identifiable by their green uniforms. They provide customer service, troubleshoot certain problems with the trains, observe and report safety issues, and check fares.

== Technology ==
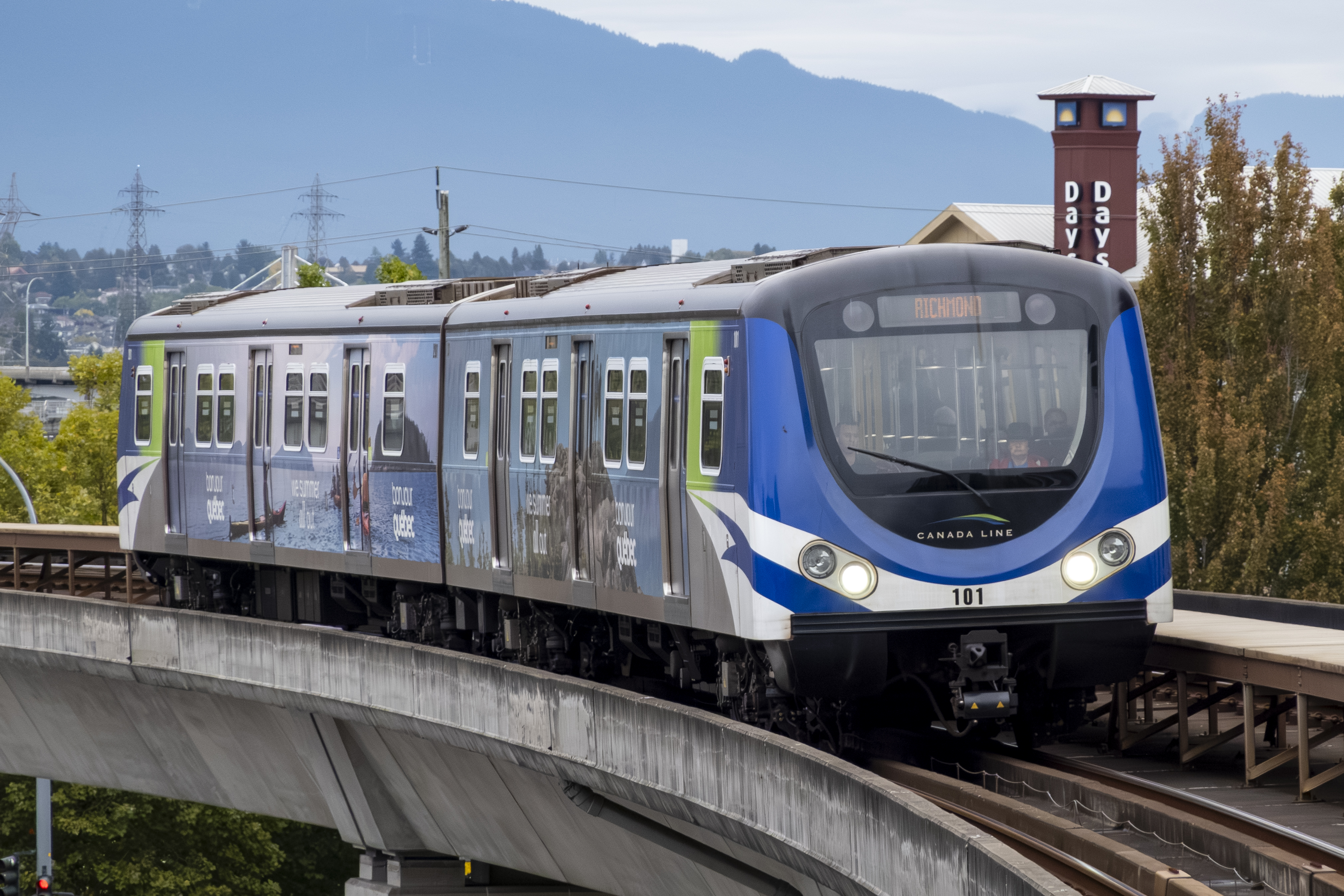
A train pulling into Capstan station

The Canada Line uses a fleet of trains built by Rotem, a division of Hyundai Motor Group. The trains are powered by conventional electric motors, rather than the linear induction motors used by the Expo and Millennium Line's Bombardier ART trains. Canada Line trains are operated by the same SelTrac automated train control system used in the rest of the SkyTrain network.

The selection of Rotem was largely a consequence of the request for proposals process for the public–private partnership, whose terms did not allow Bombardier to consider efficiencies in combining operations or rolling-stock orders for the new line with those for the existing system. This placed all bidders on a level playing field, albeit at the cost of not necessarily picking the most efficient choice for long-term operation. The RFP also required that the system have a capacity of 15,000 passengers per hour in each direction (leaving the choice of technology and platform length to the proponent) and a maximum travel time between the airport and downtown Vancouver of 24 minutes.

A photo of the interior LED display on a Canada Line Hyundai Rotem

The fleet consists of 32 fully automated two-car articulated trains, for a total of 64 cars. The capacity of the trains is estimated at 334 people per pair of cars (comfortably) or 400 people at crush load. The trains have a top speed of 80 kilometres per hour (50 mph) in normal operation. Each married pair of gangway-connected cars is 41 metres (135 ft) long and 3 metres (9.8 ft) wide, and longer and wider than the Bombardier ART fleet used on the Expo and Millennium lines. Each train has LED electronic displays on the exterior to indicate the terminus station and on the interior to display the next station and the terminus station, a useful feature considering the line has two branches.

In 2018, twelve additional trainsets were ordered by Translink from Hyundai Rotem at a cost of $88 million to increase capacity on the line. The sole-source contract allowed for commonality between the two train models, and reduced the number of specialized tools and parts required. These were delivered in 2019 and 2020.

=== Canada Line Hyundai Rotem specifications ===
- Car builder: Hyundai Rotem, South Korea
- Car body: brushed stainless steel, with fibreglass end caps and a vinyl wrap at the outer ends
- Unit numbers: pairs numbered 1xx and 2xx where xx increments from 01 to 32
- Fleet of: 32 two-car train sets
- Trainset length (across coupler faces): 41.56 metres (136.4 ft)
- Vehicle width: 3 metres (9.8 ft)
- Vehicle height (above top of rail): 3.67 metres (12.0 ft)
- Floor height (above top of rail): 1.15 metres (3 ft 9 in)
- Constructed platform height: 1.14 metres (3 ft 9 in)
- Interior ceiling height: 2.7 metres (8 ft 10 in)
- Track gauge: 1,435 mm (4 ft 8 1/2 in) standard gauge
- Total weight (empty): 76 tonnes (75 long tons; 84 short tons)
- Propulsion system: Mitsubishi Electric (MELCO) AC traction motors
- Maximum speed: 80 kilometres per hour (50 mph)
- Power: 750 V DC
- Braking system: pneumatic wheel disc brake
- Capacity (per train set): 342 passengers (41 seats)
- Capacity: 5,000 to 15,000 passengers per hour
- Coupling/numbering arrangement: all married pairs
- Signalling system: moving block controlled by cable Loop, SelTrac

== Name ==
During the planning and public consultation stages, the line was known as the "Richmond-Airport-Vancouver Line", or RAV for short. The name "Canada Line" was adopted in 2005 to coincide with the beginning of construction. Some early documents also refer to it as the "Olympic Line", in recognition of the 2010 Winter Olympics, continuing the practice by which the Expo and Millennium lines were named after significant events occurring at the time of construction. This name was adopted for the demonstration modern streetcar service that operated along the Downtown Historic Railway for a two-month period centred on the Olympics.

== Timeline ==
- Between 1990 and 1992, BC Transit and N. D. Lea (now WSP Global) consultants studied intermediate-capacity transit system options in the Vancouver–Richmond corridor.
- From September 1991 through August 1993, the TRANSPORT 2021 Steering Committee carried out an extensive program of research and public consultation to create "A Long Range Transportation Plan for Greater Vancouver". Under Project Director M. L. (Martin Crilly), a comprehensive transportation investment and financing strategy was envisioned for the region. Until today all existing and proposed road and transit investments have been put forth in this plan. The plan calls for the provision of an intermediate-capacity transit system from Richmond to Vancouver's central business district.
- In fall of 1994, N. D. Lea and Delcan consultants carried out studies examining technologies, operating feasibility, ridership, capital and operating costs, traffic impacts, and development potential in three corridors, including the Richmond–Vancouver corridor. These studies were prepared as input into BC Transit's 10-Year Development Plan. They did not include a spur line to the Vancouver International Airport.
- In 1995, BC Transit (a crown corporation responsible for public transit) expressed a desire to create a special bus rapid transit (BRT) or automated rapid transit (ART) service connecting the cities of Richmond and Vancouver and the Vancouver International Airport in one of the transit improvement plans.
  - Underground rights-of-way were reserved at the Concord Pacific development close to the Cambie bridge.
- From mid-1997 to mid-1998 a number of BRT routes for Vancouver-airport/Richmond were evaluated, and the preferred route and station locations were selected.
- June 24, 1998, the minister in charge of BC Transit, Joy MacPhail, announced plans to build a Vancouver–Richmond ALRT: "The new line would link Richmond city centre, the airport and Downtown Vancouver—probably running north-south through Vancouver along the Cambie Street corridor." "MacPhail said the province wants to accelerate the construction of rapid transit to Richmond as part of a bid to bring the 2010 Winter Olympics to the Lower Mainland."
- In 1999, detailed design of the Vancouver-Airport/Richmond BRT was carried out.
- On April 1, 1999, The Greater Vancouver Transportation Authority (TransLink) was created under the direction of CEO Ken Dobell, previously city manager for the City of Vancouver.
- In April 2000, TransLink adopted its Strategic Transportation Plan 2000–2005. The plan noted that future transit lines have equal priority, and recommended the planning and design of a Richmond-Airport-Vancouver (RAV) rapid transit line.
- May 2000 saw the approval of the RAV study, while construction had begun on the BRT service between Richmond Centre, Airport Station exchange, and downtown Vancouver.
- In 2000, a Transport Canada report on rail access to the airport estimated it would cost $1.3 billion for a SkyTrain expansion using the Cambie route and $738 million for a light rail system along the Arbutus corridor.
- In December 2000, TransLink received the report on public–private partnerships for road and transportation infrastructure, the model that would be used to finance, construct, and operate the new Canada Line.
- On April 1, 2001, bus operators and other CMBC employees went on strike, delaying full implementation of the Vancouver-Airport-Richmond BRT by four months.
- That same month, TransLink reaffirmed a Vancouver–Richmond line including a connection to the airport, and approved a recommendation by the TransLink CEO that, based on greater benefits from a private-sector perspective and community concerns, at-grade rail transit be excluded from further analysis and that analysis in Vancouver be restricted to underground options.
- On August 1, 2001, the 98 B-Line BRT service began service in the corridor, ultimately carrying over 20,000 passengers per day, while plans were already under way for an ART service to replace it. This proposed service was projected to carry over 100,000 passengers per day.
- On December 10, 2001, the federal government under Jean Chrétien announced over $2.0 billion in funding for large infrastructure projects; the Canada Strategic Infrastructure Fund established by this budget would fund the federal government's contribution to the Canada Line. The government stipulated that the fund promote private-public partnerships where appropriate.
- In April 2002, work was started on the third phase, project definition. This ten-month task consisted of a technical evaluation to determine if it was possible to build the line by 2010.
- In 2003, ten companies or consortia submitted expressions of interest in the project.
- In December 2003, this was shortlisted to the following three consortia, which were given a request for proposal:
  - RAVLink Transportation, which included Fluor Canada, Siemens, MTR Corporation and Balfour Beatty Capital Projects;
  - RAVxpress, which included Bombardier, Amec, Bouygues Travaux Publics and Bilfinger Berger; and
  - SNC-Lavalin/Serco, which included SNC-Lavalin and Serco.
- On April 16, 2004, the federal government under Prime Minister Paul Martin increased its funding promise from $300 million to $450 million.
- On June 10, 2004, the provincial government restated its commitment to the Canada Line, increasing funding from $300 to $370 million, and earmarked $170 million for the Evergreen Line.
- On June 30, 2004, after twice voting to cancel the project, the TransLink Board approved the RAV line but maintained the right to cancel the project if none of the bids met the approved budget of $1.35 billion.
- On November 19, 2004, RAVCO recommended that the SNC-Lavalin/Serco (now known as InTransitBC) proposal for a fully automated, grade-separated system be accepted. This "best and final offer" bid was $343 million over the approved budget. The project was, however, brought within the funding allowance through various cost-trimming measures, including design changes, the contractor agreeing to lower its bid, and the province contributing another $65 million.
- On December 1, 2004, the TransLink board gave final approval for the project.
- On July 29, 2005, the final contract to design, build, and operate the RAV Line was signed by InTransitBC and TransLink. Serco was no longer a partner to InTransitBC, and two pension funds were brought into the partnership.
- In October 2005, the utilities relocation and road work was started.
- On November 25, 2005, the design of the new trains was unveiled, and Hyundai Rotem was announced as the supplier of the trains. It was announced that the new line would be called the Canada Line as a funding condition from the federal government.
- The line opened at 1 p.m. local time on August 17, 2009, on budget and three and a half months ahead of schedule, and six months ahead of the 2010 Winter Olympics held in Vancouver. It began normal revenue service on the following day.
- On September 30, 2009, it was announced that the Canada Line had seen an average of 82,500 passengers per day since opening, putting it well on track to reach its ridership target of 100,000 per day within two years.
- On December 28, 2009, it was revealed that the average daily ridership (including weekends) has grown to 93,000 and has occasionally exceeded 100,000, three years ahead of expectations.
- On February 5, 2010, ridership reached a (then) record of 135,000 during a campaign to encourage residents to use transit prior to the Olympics. Further single-day records included 157,000 on February 11, 2010, and 210,000 on February 15, 2010, with all 20 trains running.
- Overall, the 2010 Winter Olympics saw the Canada Line's ridership increase by 118 percent to an average of 228,190 per day for 17 days, with a single-day record of 287,400 on February 19, 2010. Its regular non-Olympic ridership was stated as being 104,674 per weekday.
- In February 2011, Translink revealed that the average daily ridership of the Canada Line had grown to 110,000 per day.
- In September 2021, construction began on Capstan station at Capstan Way; the station opened in December 2024.

== Project funding ==
The Canada Line was built as a public–private partnership. Funding was provided by both government agencies and a private partner, the proponent. As of March 2009, the entire project was expected to cost $2.054 billion. The premier of BC stated that the project was on budget and ahead of schedule. When approved in December 2004, the cost was given as $1.76 billion.

The public contributions to the budget come from the following sources:

- Government of Canada: $450 million
- Government of British Columbia: $435 million
- Vancouver Airport Authority: $300 million
- TransLink: $334 million
- City of Vancouver: $29 million

These sums are all in 2006 dollars, except for the government of Canada's contribution, which will be paid out when constructed, and is estimated to be equivalent of $419 million 2003 dollars.

The private partner was expected to contribute $200 million, and be responsible for any construction cost overruns. As of November 7, 2009, InTransitBC has invested $750 million. InTransitBC is a joint venture company owned by SNC-Lavalin, the Investment Management Corporation of BC (bcIMC), and the Caisse de dépôt et placement du Québec.

The BC government had committed $370 million, but when the bid came in over budget, it contributed an extra $65 million. TransLink also put in extra money by committing money from the sale of the Sexsmith Park and Ride in Richmond and from the introduction of a special fare in the Airport Zone.

In November 2004, bid costs were reduced by postponing the construction of a walkway between Waterfront station and the cruise ship terminal, removing Westminster station, and moving Richmond Centre station and the end of the line several hundred metres north. TransLink would further pay for the cost of reinstallation of the trolley wires along Cambie. As a way to further reduce the best and final offer, RAVCO no longer required that the proponent provide for 59 ticket vending machines and 38 ticket validating machines or for a police unit to operate on the RAV line. RAVCO also shifted responsibility for moving trolley wires from SNC-Lavalin to TransLink. Costs were also decreased due to decisions to single-track sections on the Richmond and airport branches. The Richmond branch was single-tracked from Ackroyd Road onward in large part due to Richmond's city council pressuring for the visual profile of the overhead line to be reduced for esthetic reasons.

On July 11, 2006, a decision was made to relocate Broadway station half a block north at a cost of $3 million to allow for better integration of the station with Broadway and a new development in the area. The funding was provided as follows: one third from the City of Vancouver, one third from TransLink, and one third from surplus funding available to CLCO.

In February 2007, TransLink approved the addition of a pedestrian and bicycle path to the Canada Line Bridge and agreed not to postpone the construction of a station at 2nd Avenue (Olympic Village station), but instead build it to be ready when the line opens. The $10 million cost of the bridge bike path was paid for by TransLink and not considered part of the cost of the Canada Line. The Olympic Village station cost an additional $29 million.

RAVCO was set up by the agencies funding the transit line to oversee project design, procurement, construction, and implementation. This TransLink subsidiary, later renamed Canada Line Rapid Transit Inc (CLCO), made distributions to the builder as work progressed.

The table below lists the year-by-year contributions (in millions of dollars) made by various governments on a year-by-year basis up to December 31, 2008. Contributions by TransLink are total disbursements minus contributions from the City of Vancouver, the government of British Columbia, and the government of Canada. Calculations show that TransLink has contributed $271 million to date. It has committed an additional $52 million in its 2009 budget.

Year	Vancouver	BC government	Canadian government	Total disbursements through TransLink	Airport disbursements
2008	$7.1	$59.6	$93.4	$163.2	$46.8
2007	$14.9	$58.4	$167.4	$336.7	$94.6
2006	$6.9	$17.2	$125.6	$322.5	$108.4
2005	$1.1	$117.1	$108.9	$209.4	$15.7

The private sector will operate the line for 35 years in return for a share of its operating revenue.

In early 2006, TransLink decided not to install turnstiles at Canada Line stations, but stations would be designed to accommodate controlled access to allow TransLink to install them for less cost if it wished to do so in the future. On April 9, 2009, TransLink, the provincial government, and the government of Canada announced joint funding of $100 million to introduce turnstiles at all 49 SkyTrain stations. While a large portion of this funding will be used on the Expo and Millennium Lines, a portion will be used on the Canada Line stations. The federal government is contributing $30 million and the province is adding $40 million toward fare gates, or controlled access gates.

== Construction ==
Construction began in October 2005 and was completed in August 2009.

At initial completion, the line comprised the following construction elements:

Segment type	Length
Tunnel	9,080 m (29,790 ft)
Elevated	7,349 m (24,111 ft)
Bridge	614 m (2,014 ft)
At-grade	1,385 m (4,544 ft)

In addition to the 18.4 kilometres (11.4 mi) of track above, there are about 500 metres (1,600 ft) of track in the OMC.

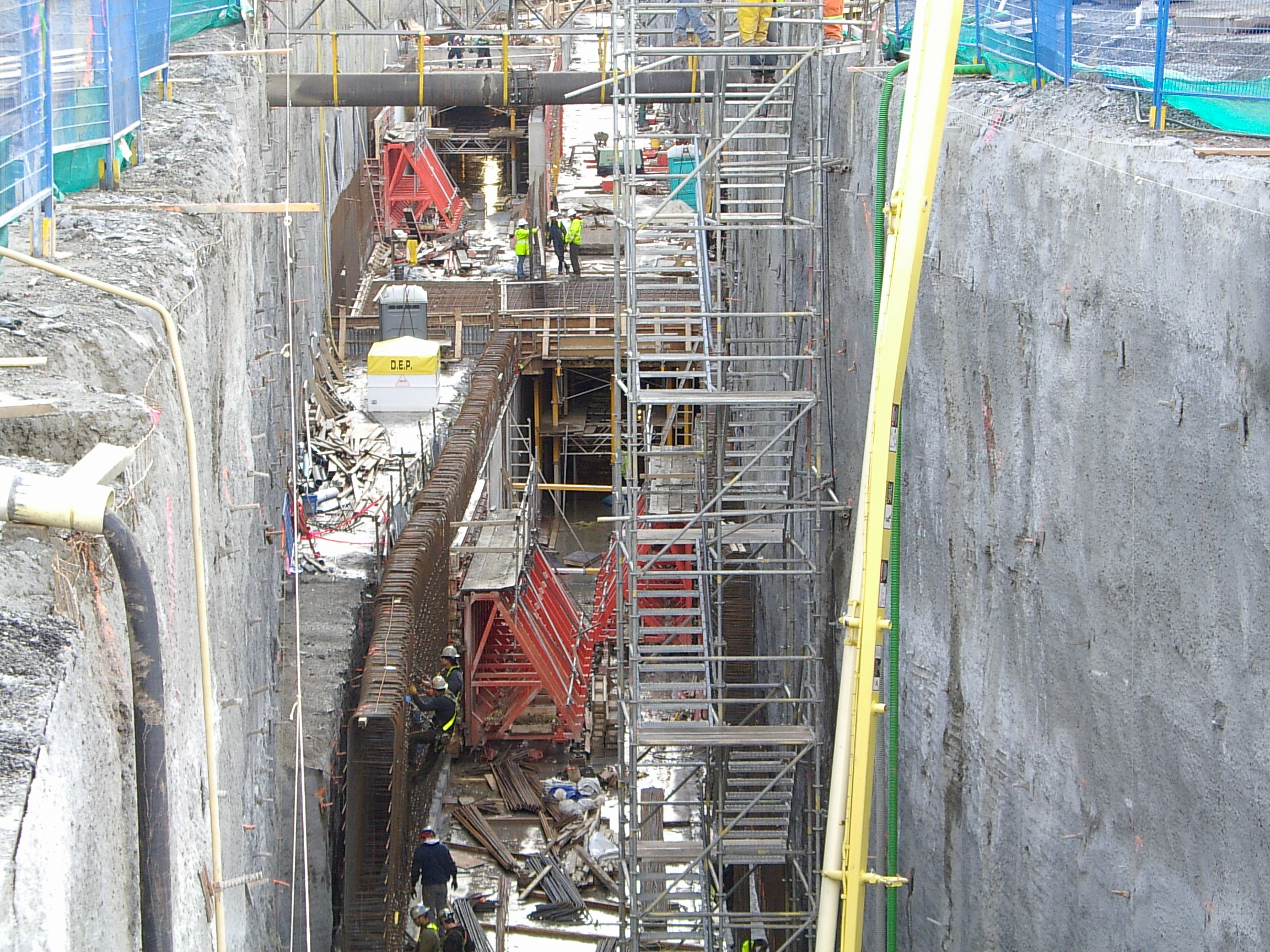
Cut and cover construction on Cambie Street just south of 25th Avenue, February 23, 2007

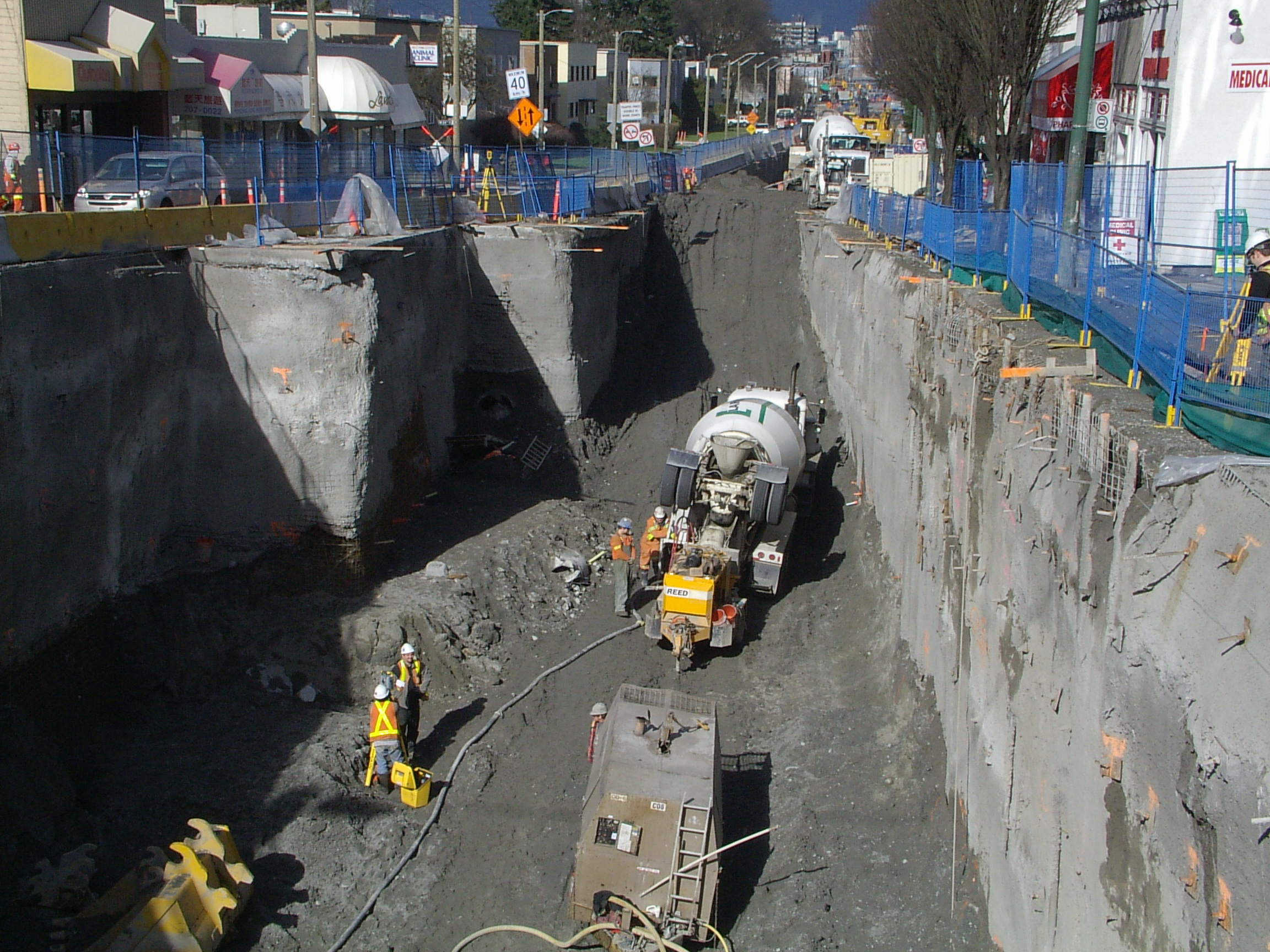
Cut and cover construction on Cambie Street just north of 25th Avenue, February 23, 2007

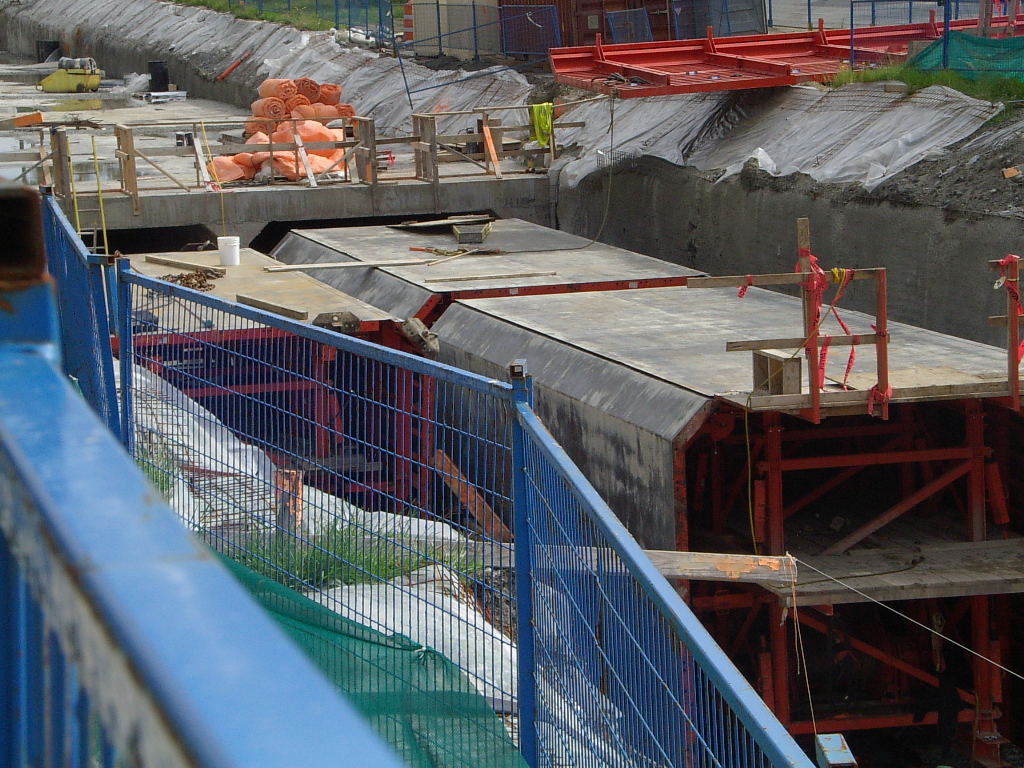
Cut and cover construction on Cambie Street between 41st and 49th Avenue, June 7, 2007

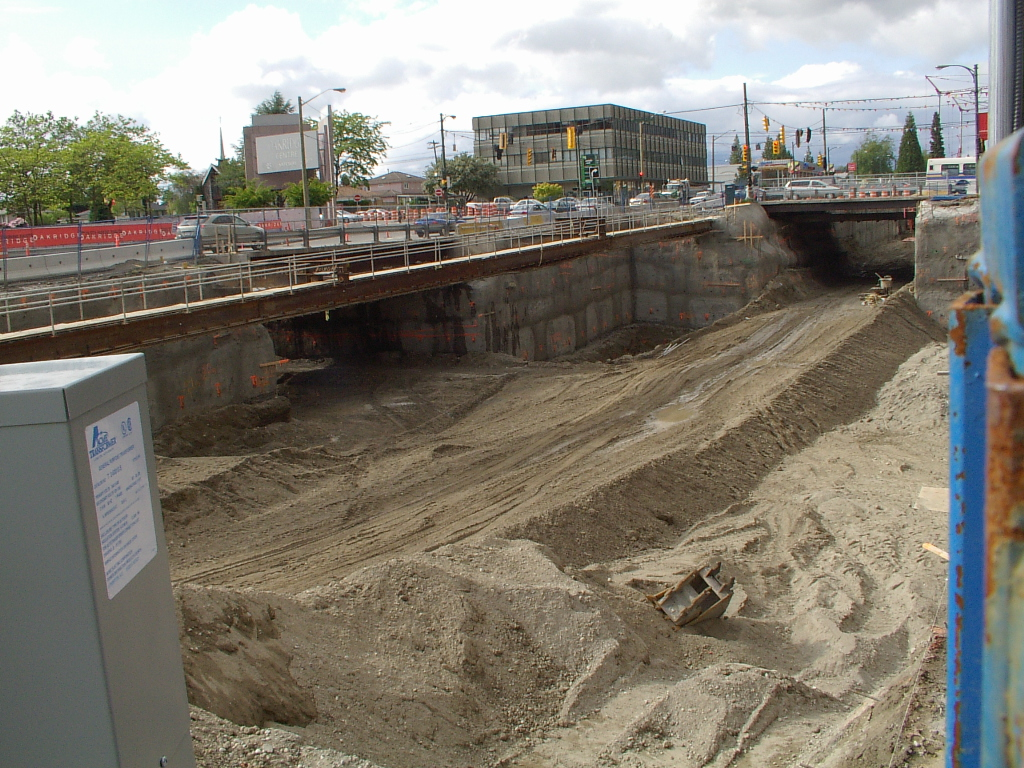
Cut and cover construction on Cambie Street at Cambie and 41st Avenue, June 7, 2007

Elevated guideway construction at YVR, November 18, 2006

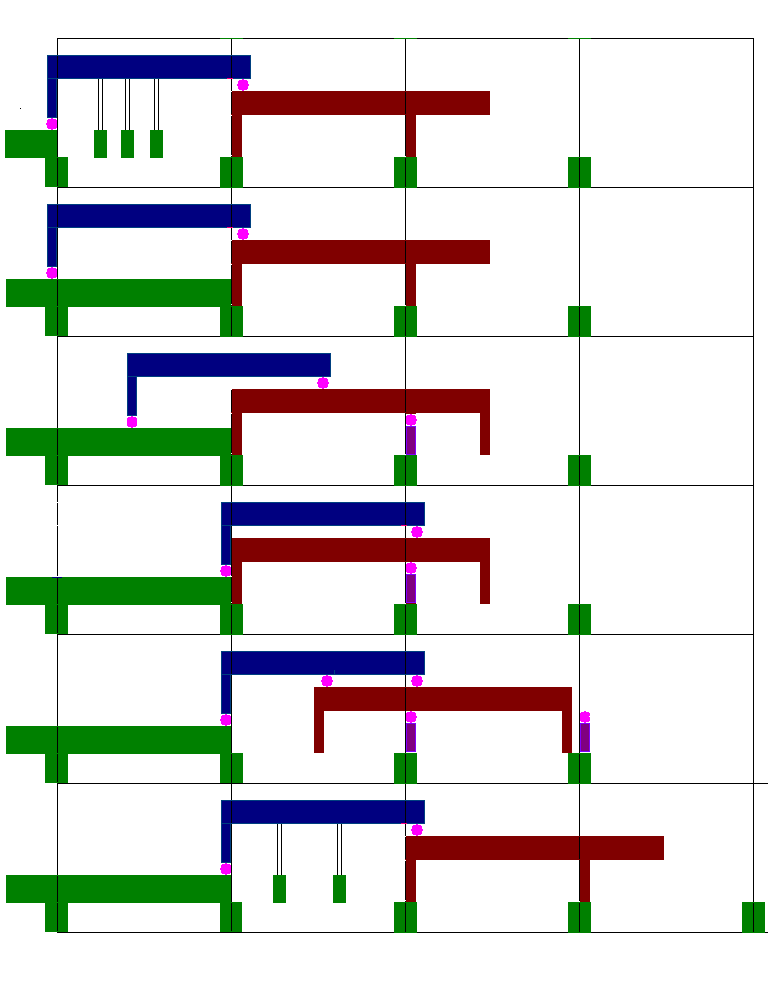
Graphical representation of movement of truss system used to install guideway segments

Elevated guideway construction at YVR, November 18, 2006, end view

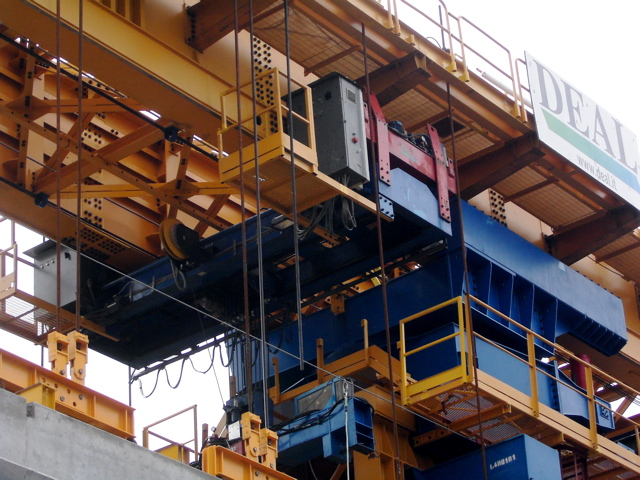
Detail of crane component of overhead cantilever truss system, September 30, 2006, near Sea Island Centre

TBM installation in preparation for boring tunnel under False Creek June 10, 2006

TBM installation apparently required construction of round portals on south side of excavation, June 10, 2006

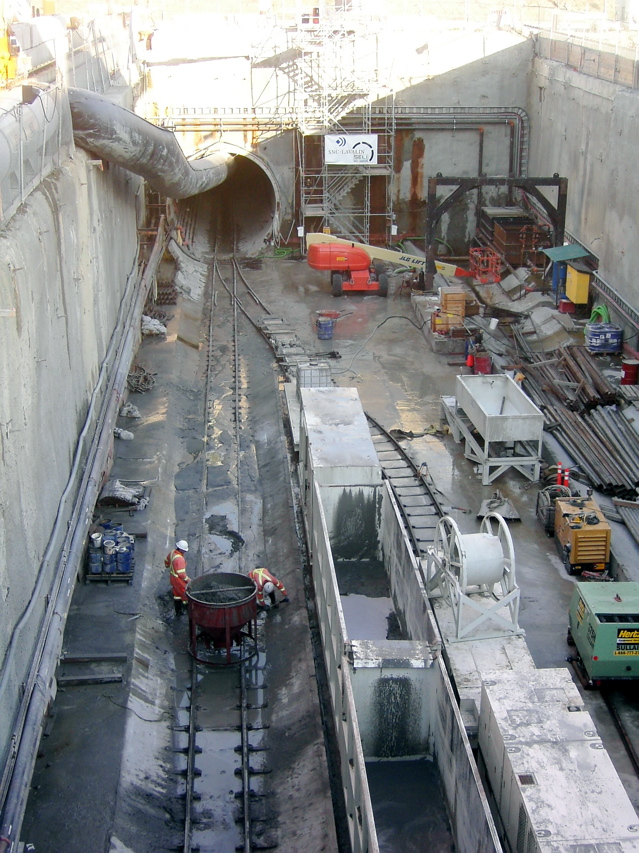
Configuration of site reflects support for tunnelling operation underway under False Creek Inlet on October 5, 2006

Detail of tunnel boring machine showing wheels that allow the machine to roll along the round contoured concrete track. June 10, 2006.

== Controversies ==
Opponents have claimed that the approval process was undemocratic and dishonest. In 2004, critics said that the projected ridership figures were grossly inflated; ridership projections were exceeded in 2010 and subsequent years. Opponents also argued that the official claim that the project had nothing to do with Vancouver's bid to host the 2010 Winter Olympics was not credible.

=== Public–private partnerships ===
Opponents of the RAV line's public–private partnership (P3) believe it was politically motivated and that it will cost more money because of the private involvement. However, the private involvement allowed for construction costs to be known and fixed up front. After raising its contribution to $435 million, the BC minister of transport and premier reaffirmed that this was the final contribution and that any cost overruns would be the responsibility of the proponent. The Canadian Union of Public Employees opposed the use of a P3 to design, build, and operate the Canada Line. The P3 process did not allow precise plans to be developed with public consultation, but limited discussion to certain abstract parameters, while leaving actual design details to the private partner.

=== Ridership projections ===
Before the building of the line, TransLink had projected that it would require a 100,000 passenger/day average to reach the "break even point". They also projected that it would take about three years for capacity to reach this point and that TransLink would be responsible for the loss. However, the Canada Line reached its projected ridership goal in late 2010, three years early. In 2017, TransLink CEO Kevin Desmond suggested that the Canada Line was underbuilt for its ridership, especially because more people moved into transit-oriented developments along the line following its completion. In 2019, former Vancouver city councillor Gord Price noted that the desire to have the line open in time for the 2010 Winter Olympics, as well as not exceeding the budget, led to cautious decision making. In 2018, 12 additional trainsets were purchased to increase capacity on the line by 35 percent.

=== Alignment and grade separation ===
==== Vancouver ====
Although the latest proposal for rapid transit did not include an option for rapid transit down the Arbutus corridor along the abandoned CPR right of way, Vancouver council reopened debate on this issue. Given that the rail right of way is currently zoned for transit use with space available for transit lines, running the line down the Arbutus corridor may have been more cost-effective than tunnelling under Cambie. The planners and RAVCO, however, countered that the Arbutus corridor does not have the major concentration of transit destinations and origins that exist along the Cambie Street corridor, such as Vancouver City Hall, Vancouver General Hospital, Oakridge Centre, and Langara College, which are necessary to provide the ridership required for this project to be successful. Also the Arbutus corridor is longer than the Cambie corridor and would cause longer travel times. The Cambie corridor further had greater potential for future ridership growth.

The Project Definition Report further specified that any service had to be able to travel from Waterfront station in downtown Vancouver to the airport in 25 minutes or less. At-grade transit, either along Cambie or the Arbutus corridor, was ruled out as a result. The reason or origin for this exact requirement was not specified, although travel times were considered an important factor in attracting new riders and in retaining existing riders, who were now required to make an extra transfer relative to the existing bus service.

All partner contributions were made upon the specifications set in the Project Definition Report. Any "significant change" would allow each partner to reconsider its respective contribution. As the Arbutus corridor proposal could not meet the specifications, this could put participation of funding partners in jeopardy.

Residents along Cambie Boulevard created the Cambie Boulevard Heritage Society in 1994, which opposed any alteration to a wide green centre median that is currently a grassy area with various species of trees, including cherry trees donated by the City of Yokohama on occasion of the 1967 Canadian Centennial. The residents had already been mobilized in 1989 in response to the possibility of elevated rail along Cambie Boulevard. In effect the residents were opposed to surface, trench, or elevated rail along much of Cambie Street. Even cut-and-cover construction raised concerns over construction impacts and temporary traffic diversions. Cost and ridership risks were also concerns to property tax–paying residents. Advertisements asked residents to join "to prevent Vancouver's worst traffic nightmare and from burdening ourselves and our children with unnecessary tax risks for years to come". The society suggested that the line instead be constructed along Arbutus, where its impact and cost would be minimal. Despite the society's concerns, one of the final two proposals for the Canada Line in 2004 involved a trench in the centre of Cambie Street from 49th to 64th Avenues.

On June 18, 2004, the TransLink Board voted 6–6 to oppose sending the project to the "best and final offer" stage. Opponents of the project favoured a proposal to build a line along the Cambie corridor involving a minimal amount of tunnelling, at a saving of about $300 million over the previously fully grade-separated proposal. The province responded to the suggestion by withdrawing funding until after the 2010 Olympics; Minister of Transport Kevin Falcon said that such a change of scope could no longer be accommodated in the time left before 2010. Mayors and councillors sitting on the TransLink Board, however, could not come to an agreement on this alternate plan of action. The impasse created a stir in the business community, which joined together and called for the province to take over control of the project. "The Coalition FOR a Lower Mainland Rapid Transit Solution" in a newspaper ad called on the premier to "please rescue our rapid transit". The Vancouver Board of Trade, the Council of Tourism Associations, and Tourism Vancouver led the call on the premier. While the board ultimately voted to proceed, the incident had lasting repercussions for TransLink.

==== Richmond ====
When the results of the bidding process indicated that an elevated option in Richmond was the winning bid, Richmond council engaged in some last-minute opposition to the RAV line and refused to give RAVCO the green light.

Objections to the elevated line included its visual impact and the impact and cost of any extensions into Richmond. The line would have varied impact on businesses along No. 3 Road.

In November 2004, a survey of 11,750 people was conducted by RAVCO to determine if people in Richmond supported an elevated or at-grade service in Richmond. Of the respondents, 58 percent favoured an elevated option.

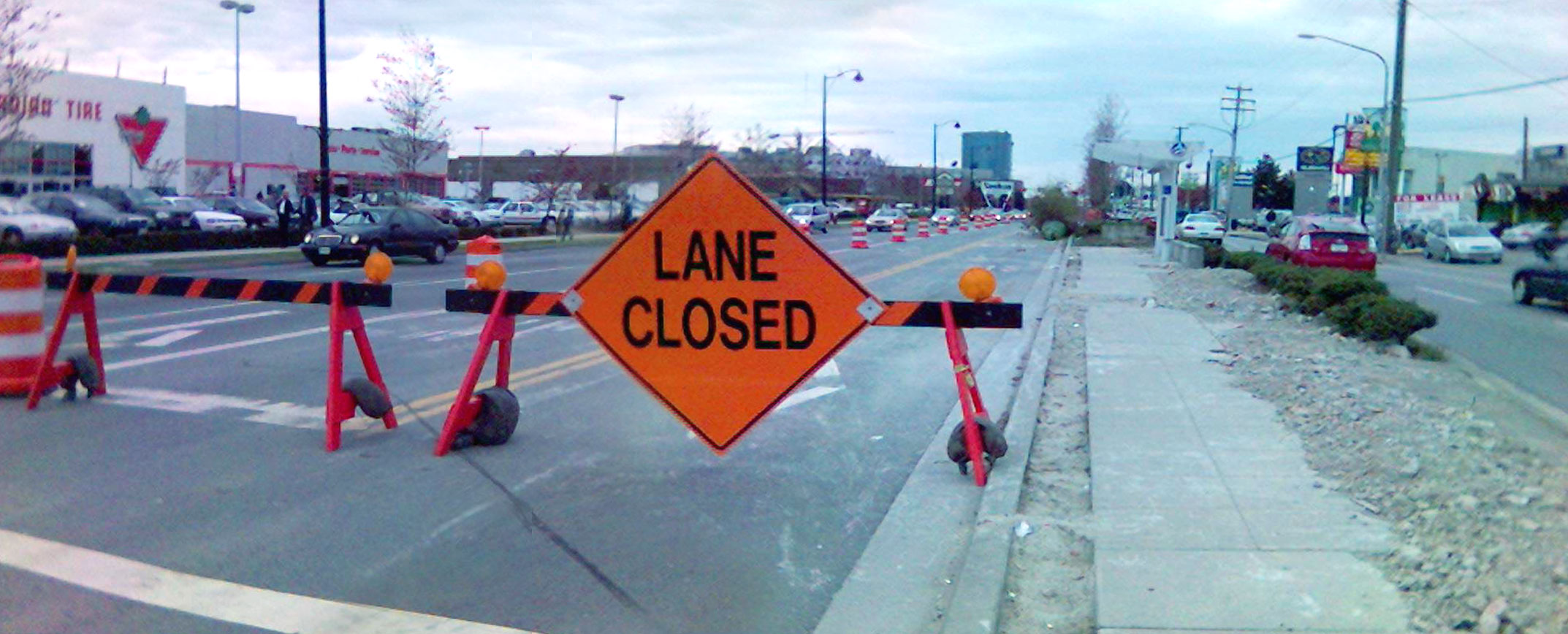
Closure and dismantling of 98 B-Line busway on No. 3 Road at Capstan Way to make way for Canada Line, April 2006

Even after the survey, however, another option was brought forward. On November 22, 2004, Richmond council considered whether an elevated guideway along No. 3 Road in Richmond was appropriate. If an at-grade service was not feasible, council had instructed staff to look into the possibility of relocating the elevated guideway further west, along Minoru Boulevard. In response, residents along Minoru Boulevard presented a petition containing 666 signatures opposing the Minoru alignment. In the petition they "indicated that if Translink and RAVCO were not prepared to construct an at-grade system on No. 3 Road, then the project should be abandoned in favour of bus service on No. 3 Road."

When further surveys and public consultation conducted by city staff in December indicated that residents did not support the realignment along Minoru Boulevard, council was left to either turn down the development or support the best and final offer. They chose to go ahead with the project. As a final compromise, part of the elevated track in Richmond was single-tracked to reduce visual impact.

=== Impact on local businesses ===
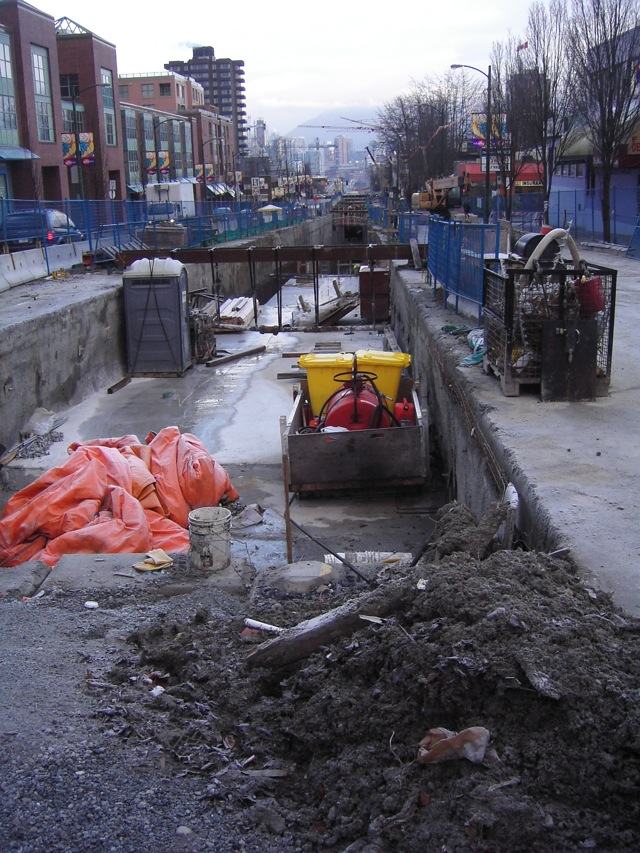
One side of the street was cut off from traffic and parking was affected.

The "business is open" logo

For the entire consultation process, it was assumed that any underground construction along the Cambie corridor would be by bored tunnel. It was only upon the publication of the winning bid that it became apparent that the portion of the line from 64th to 2nd Avenues would be constructed using cut-and-cover construction. This raised concern over the disruption of local business on Cambie Street. Businesses in Yaletown and No. 3 Road in Richmond would also be affected by the construction. Although construction in the downtown was mostly by bored tunnel, businesses in Yaletown were caught off guard when it turned out that Yaletown-Roundhouse station would be north of Pacific Boulevard on Davie Street, rather than south of Pacific Boulevard. InTransitBC responded by launching an advertising campaign promoting local business on the line. Despite these efforts, businesses on Cambie Street experienced significant loss of business. After numerous failed appeals to the provincial government for compensation, store operators unsuccessfully sued for compensation. However, since the completion of the Canada Line, the line has been linked to rising property values along Cambie Street and in Richmond.

=== Impact on expansion of other transit options ===
It had been pointed out that construction of the Canada Line would do little to improve transit or alleviate congestion on the Broadway corridor to UBC, which serves more than 100,000 weekday trips on bus services, with many trips continuing to University of British Columbia. In addition, the Evergreen Extension rapid transit project was delayed (until 2016). As TransLink is solely responsible for funding bus operations, any shortage of funding may translate into cuts in bus service.

=== Hiring practices ===
There were several labour disputes related to wages and unionization between employees and contractors working on the construction of the Canada Line. To excavate the final 2 kilometres (1.2 mi) of the tunnel underneath the downtown core a crew of 36 Latin American workers were brought to Canada from Costa Rica, Ecuador and Colombia in April 2006. The employer, a joint partnership of SELI Canada and SNC (Pacific) engaged workers to assemble the tunnel boring machine (TBM) and begin excavations. Pay stubs and testimony evidence from the workers indicated that they were paid US$1,000 monthly in exchange for 65-hour work weeks (less than $4 per hour). The Latin Americans, all on temporary work permits, joined the Construction and Specialized Workers Unions Local 1611 and, in a majority vote, won union certification on June 23, 2006. This was the first time in Canadian history that a group of temporary foreign workers in the construction industry had successfully exercised their right to form a union. Before the union had a chance to begin collective bargaining, workers' wages were increased to $14.21 per hour and hours were reduced to 40 hours per week with overtime concessions as required by BC labour law. The union was not consulted, and the unilateral pay raise led to an unfair labour practice complaint from the CSWU 1611. The BC Labour Relations Board (BCLRB) sided with the employer's (SELI–SNCP) explanation that there had been a mistake in calculations of wages during the months before the workers voted to join the union. The employer stalled negotiations for a collective agreement until they were ordered back to the bargaining table in August 2006 by the BCLRB.

In September, bargaining broke down. On September 21, 2006, CSWU 1611 workers threatened a strike vote to bring the employer back to the bargaining table.

After almost two years of litigation, the BC Labour Relations Board ruled against the union's claims of unfair labour practices.

In a separate complaint, the union claimed discrimination against the workers based on their country of origin. Even with the newly imposed wage of $14.21 per hour, the Latin Americans were earning half the wages of European (Italian, Spanish and Portuguese) workers with whom they worked alongside and performed the same underground TBM operations.

On November 9, 2007, the BC Human Rights Tribunal ruled that the Latin American workers had been intimidated to sign a petition against being represented by their union. The tribunal found that the workers were intimidated and coerced to sign a petition in the fear of possibly losing future job prospects with their employer. The petition would have prevented them from being represented by a union before the tribunal and would also have created evidence that could have jeopardized the ongoing investigation by the tribunal over perceived discrimination.

Upon completion of the tunnels in March 2008, the workers were laid-off and returned to their home countries. Only five of the workers were re-hired by SELI after their arrival back to their home countries.

On December 3, 2008, the BC Human Rights Tribunal found in favour of the discrimination complaint. The decision prohibits employers from discrimination based on a workers' country of origin. Migrant workers must not suffer wage discrimination based on low wage labour markets in their countries of origin. The Latin Americans workers were awarded the difference in wages with an additional $10,000 each in punitive damages. The total award averaged approximately $50,000 per worker or $2.5 million.

SELI Canada appealed the decision to the BC Supreme Court. In December 2012, SELI agreed to a settlement offer by the union. The Latin American workers voted unanimously to accept a settlement. The settlement provided payments worth 50% of the original award.
