= Airport station (TransLink) =

Former Metro Vancouver bus station

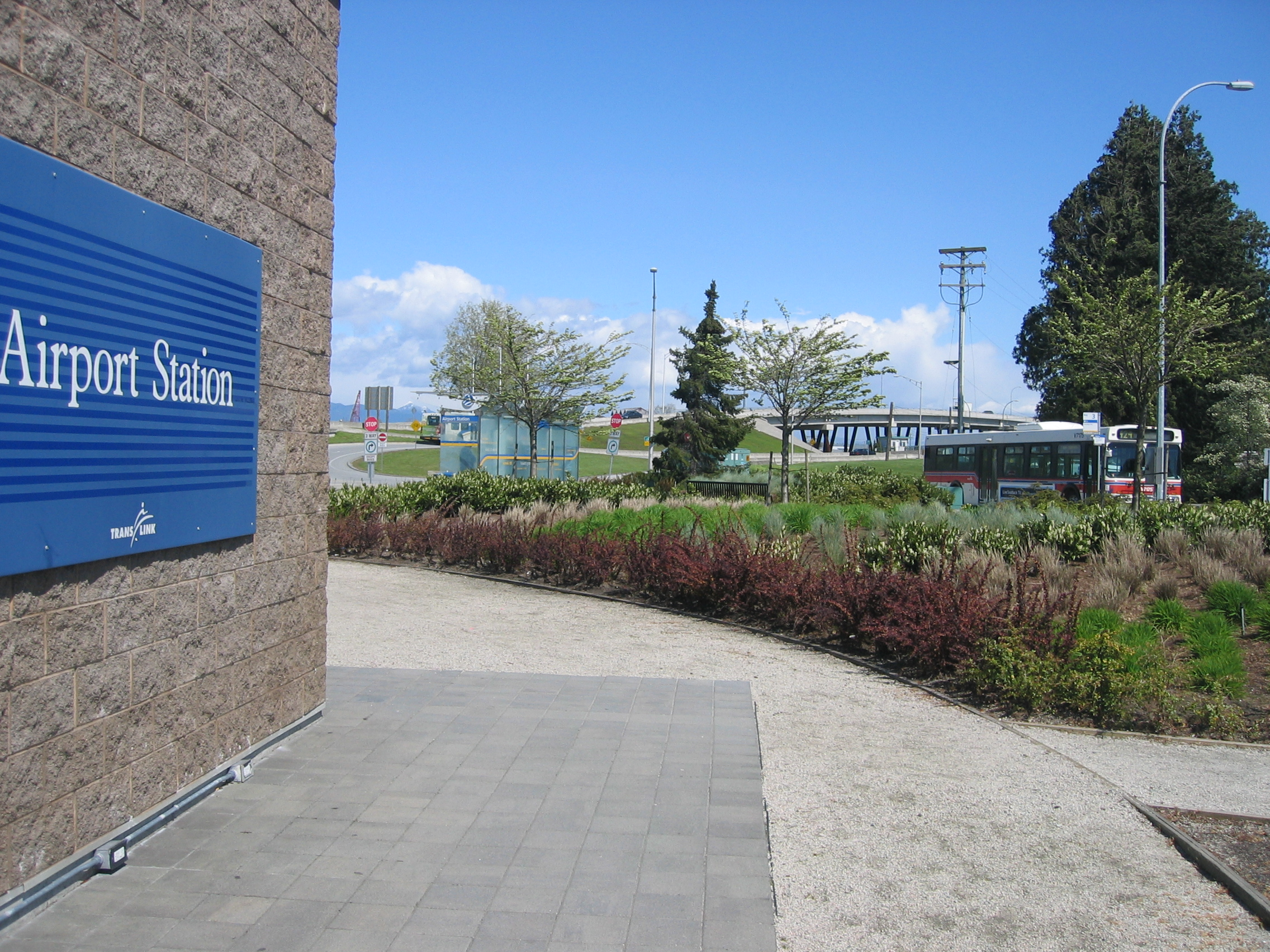
- Airport station facing northeast, toward Lulu Island (as seen in 2006)

General information
- Location: Canada
- Coordinates: 49°11′31″N 123°8′30″W
- Owner: TransLink
- Operator: TransLink
- Bus routes: 2 (formerly 12)
- Bus stands: 3 (formerly 6)
- Bus operators: Coast Mountain Bus Company

Other information
- Fare zone: 2

History
- Opened: September 4, 2000
- Closed: September 7, 2009
Location

Airport station was a TransLink public transit exchange on Sea Island, Richmond, in Metro Vancouver. Most bus operations using the location ceased September 7, 2009, two and a half weeks after the opening of the Canada Line, when the exchange downgraded to a regular bus stop.

== Overview ==
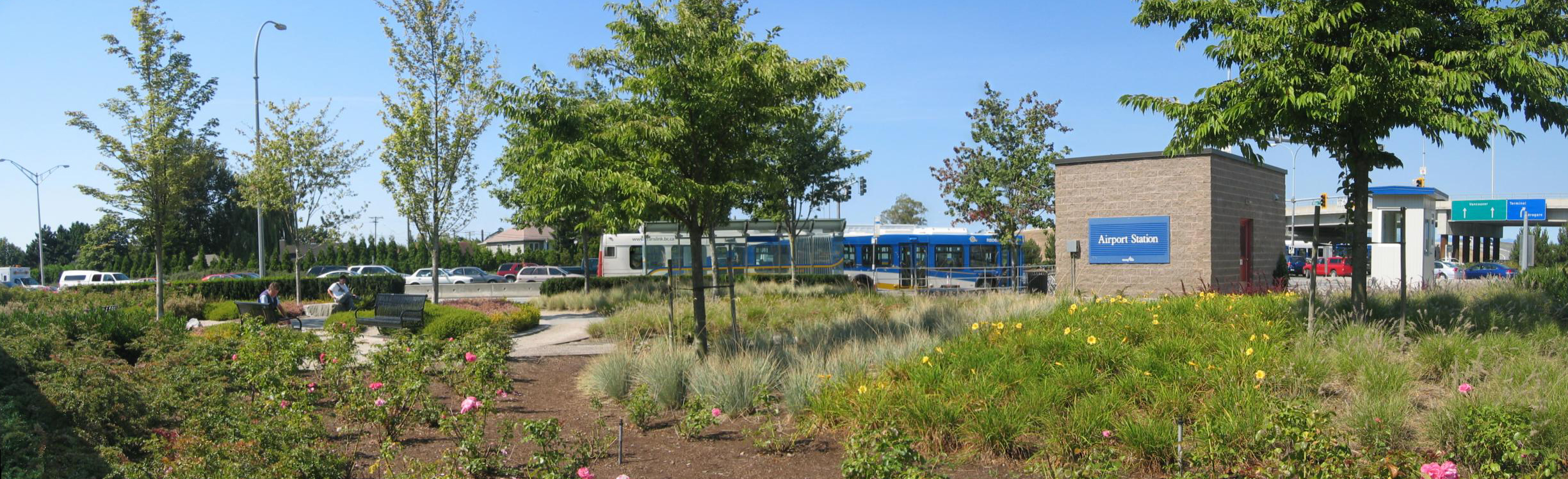
Wide shot of Airport station, facing northwest

On September 4, 2000, the 98 B-Line commenced an introductory service phase that connected Downtown Vancouver with a temporary terminus on Aylmer Road, opposite the Park & Fly lot for Vancouver International Airport (YVR). On December 18, 2000, the permanent terminus opened at the foot of the Moray Bridge near the intersection of Russ Baker Way and Miller Road. A bus-only on-ramp to the bridge served this location.

In August 2001, the 98 B-Line service extended to central Richmond. From October 2001, the exchange was the transfer point for the 424 Airport / Airport station connection, which became the only daytime and evening route to the Vancouver International Airport's main terminal. The N10 route covered this destination outside of those hours.

Airport station also served community shuttles for Sea Island North, nearby Burkeville, and the south terminal of the Vancouver International Airport, which handles local and smaller airlines.

After the opening of the SkyTrain's Canada Line on September 7, 2009, most bus routes serving the exchange were discontinued or terminated at Richmond–Brighouse station, Bridgeport station or Marpole Loop.

== Routes ==
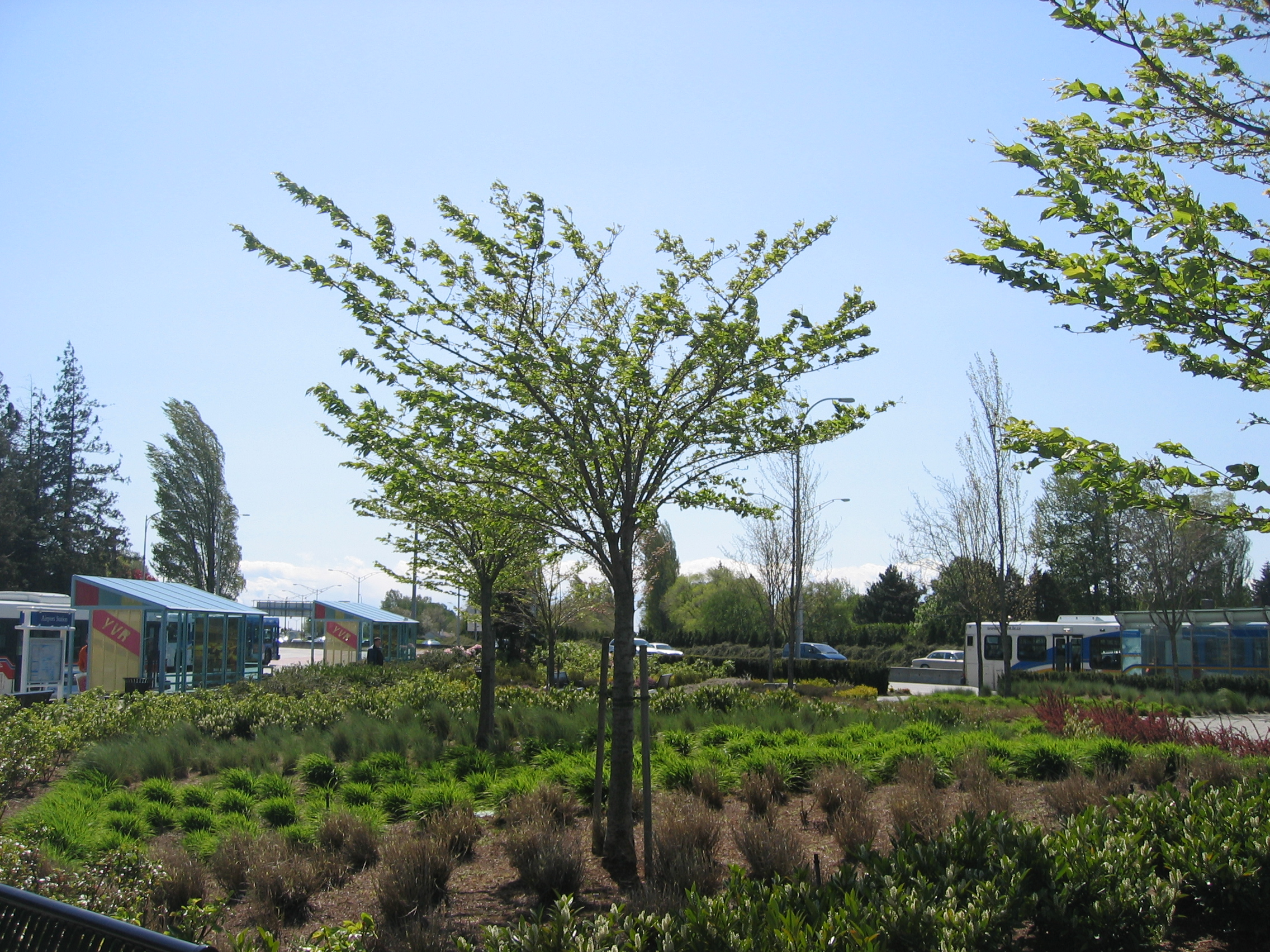
Airport station, facing south towards the south terminal and Russ Baker Way

The following routes still stop at the former location:

- 412 Sea Island South / Bridgeport station: renumbered from C92 in August 2018.
- N10 Downtown / Richmond–Brighouse station (NightBus service): from September 2004, when the route was called Downtown / Richmond Centre.

The following routes once served Airport station:

- C90 Sea Island North / Airport station: prior to September 2008; after September 2009 closure, Bridgeport station became eastern terminus; discontinued in September 2012.
- C92 Sea Island South / Airport station: renumbered from 425 and renamed circa May 2005. After September 2009 closure, Bridgeport station became eastern terminus, but the stop remained on the route.
- 98 B-Line Burrard station / Richmond Centre (see above); discontinued after September 2009 closure.
- 100 22nd Street station / Airport station: prior to April 2001, Airport station was a stop on existing 22nd Street station / Airport route to YVR; became route terminus after route split with 424 in October 2001; After September 2009 closure, Marpole Loop became western terminus.
- 301 Newton Exchange / Airport station: September 2004; Richmond Centre became western terminus in November 2005; terminus change to Richmond–Brighouse station in September 2009.
- 404 Ladner Exchange / Airport station: stop on existing route to YVR from December 2000; northern terminus after route split with 424 in October 2001; from September 2009 closure, Richmond–Brighouse station became northern terminus.
- 411 Burrard station / One Road: stop on existing route from December 2000; renumbered to 491 in August 2001.
- 424 Airport: from Oct 2001; discontinued after September 2009 closure.
- 425 Airport South / Airport station: stop on existing Airport South / Richmond Exchange route from December 2000; became eastern terminus with route renamed in April 2001; renumbered C92 circa May 2005.
- 491 Steveston / One Road / Burrard station: renumbered from 411 in August 2001; discontinued after September 2009 closure.
- 496 Railway / Burrard station: from Aug 2001; discontinued after September 2009 closure.
- 620 Tsawwassen Ferry / Airport station: from April 2004; Bridgeport station became northern terminus after September 2009 closure.
