= 98 B-Line =

Former express bus service in Metro Vancouver, Canada

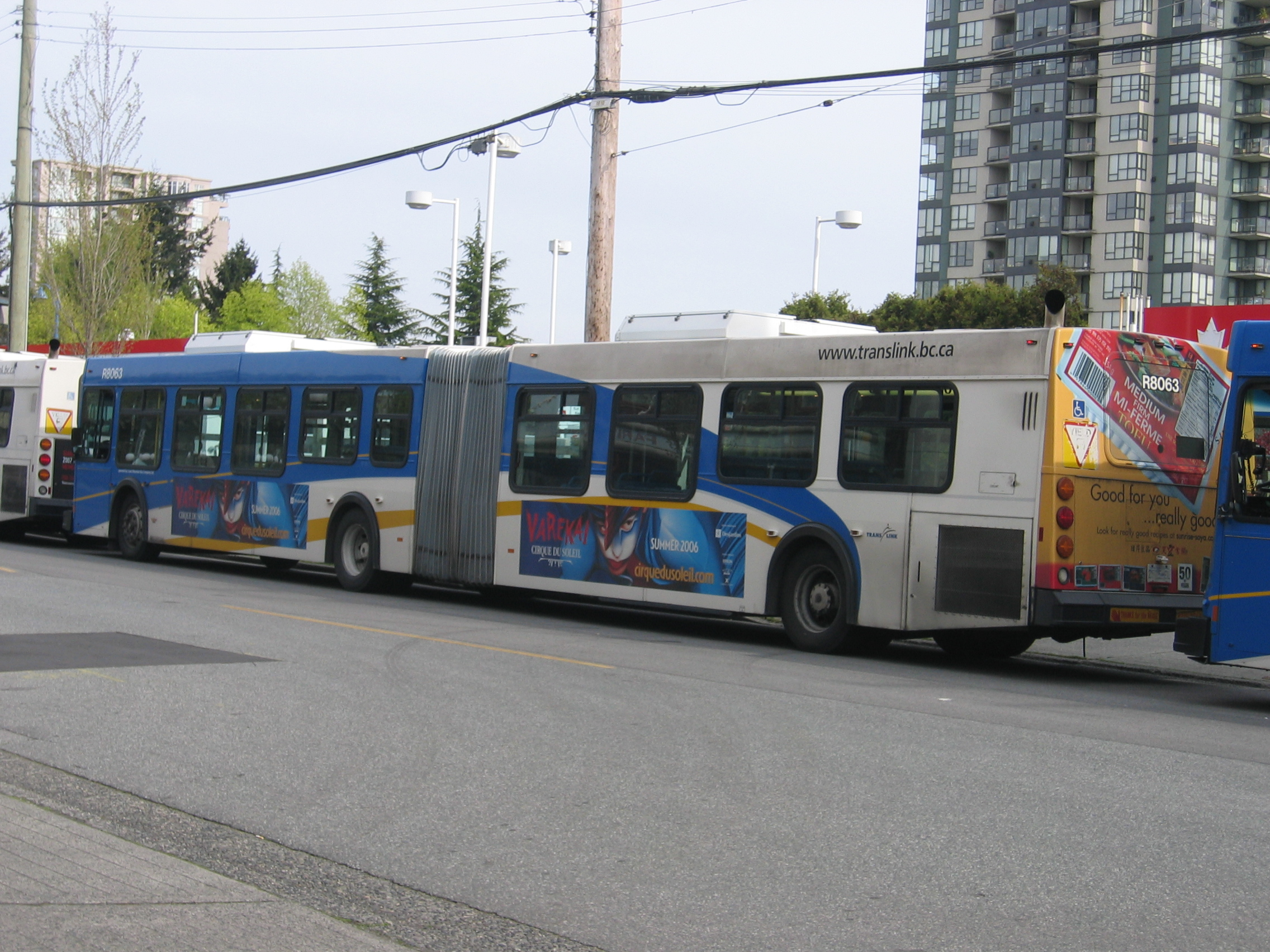
- 98 B-Line bus on Anderson Road

Overview
- System: TransLink
- Operator: Coast Mountain Bus Company
- Vehicle: New Flyer Industries D60LF
- Began service: September 4, 2000
- Ended service: September 7, 2009

Route
- Start: Burrard Station
- End: Brighouse (Steveston & Shell, evenings and morning only)
- Length: 16 km (9.9 mi)
- Stops: 22
Route map

The 98 B-Line was a bus rapid transit line in Metro Vancouver, British Columbia, Canada, that began service in September 2000. It linked Richmond to Downtown Vancouver, with a connection to Vancouver International Airport. It travelled mainly along Granville Street in Vancouver and a dedicated bus lane on No. 3 Road in Richmond. It was operated by Coast Mountain Bus Company and was funded by TransLink. The route was 16 kilometres (9.9 mi) long. The line carried over 18,000 passengers daily. It was discontinued in September 2009, shortly after the opening of the Canada Line, which replaced it.

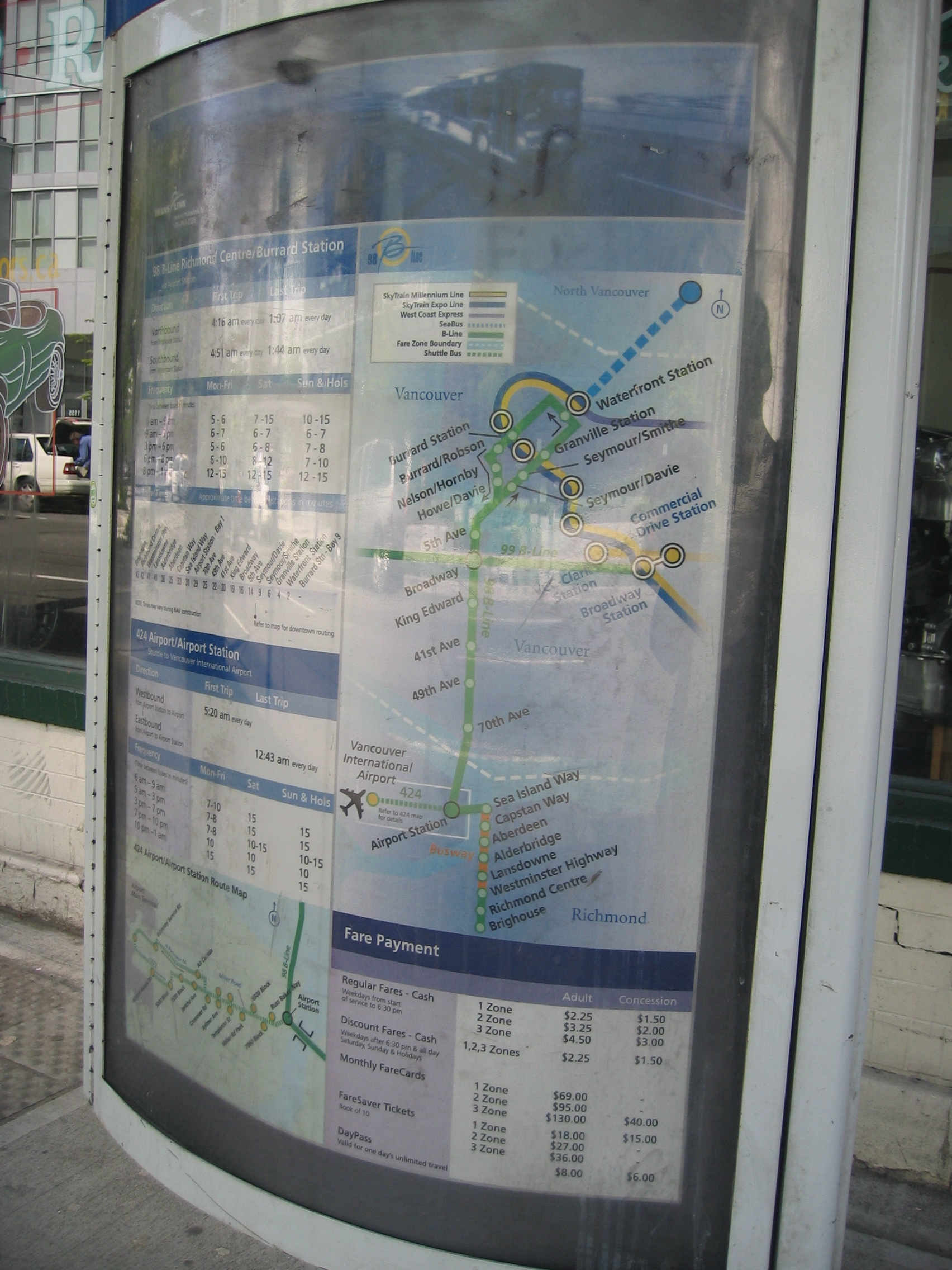
Typical 98 B-Line stop information poster

== History ==
Prior to the introduction of the 98 B-Line, most bus routes in Richmond travelled into Downtown Vancouver during rush hours. These routes served all stops along their routes in Richmond, then would operate along Granville Street in Vancouver as express services.

Although the idea of a rapid bus line from Richmond to Vancouver had been discussed for decades, it was first proposed by BC Transit in 1994. In 1995, Vancouver city council approved a southbound high-occupancy vehicle lane for the evening peak hours in the Marpole neighbourhood in preparation for an express bus service. In 1997, the idea of a rapid transit line was re-introduced with the objective of providing the express service at regular fares. A study determined that the best route for the line would be via Granville Street in Vancouver.

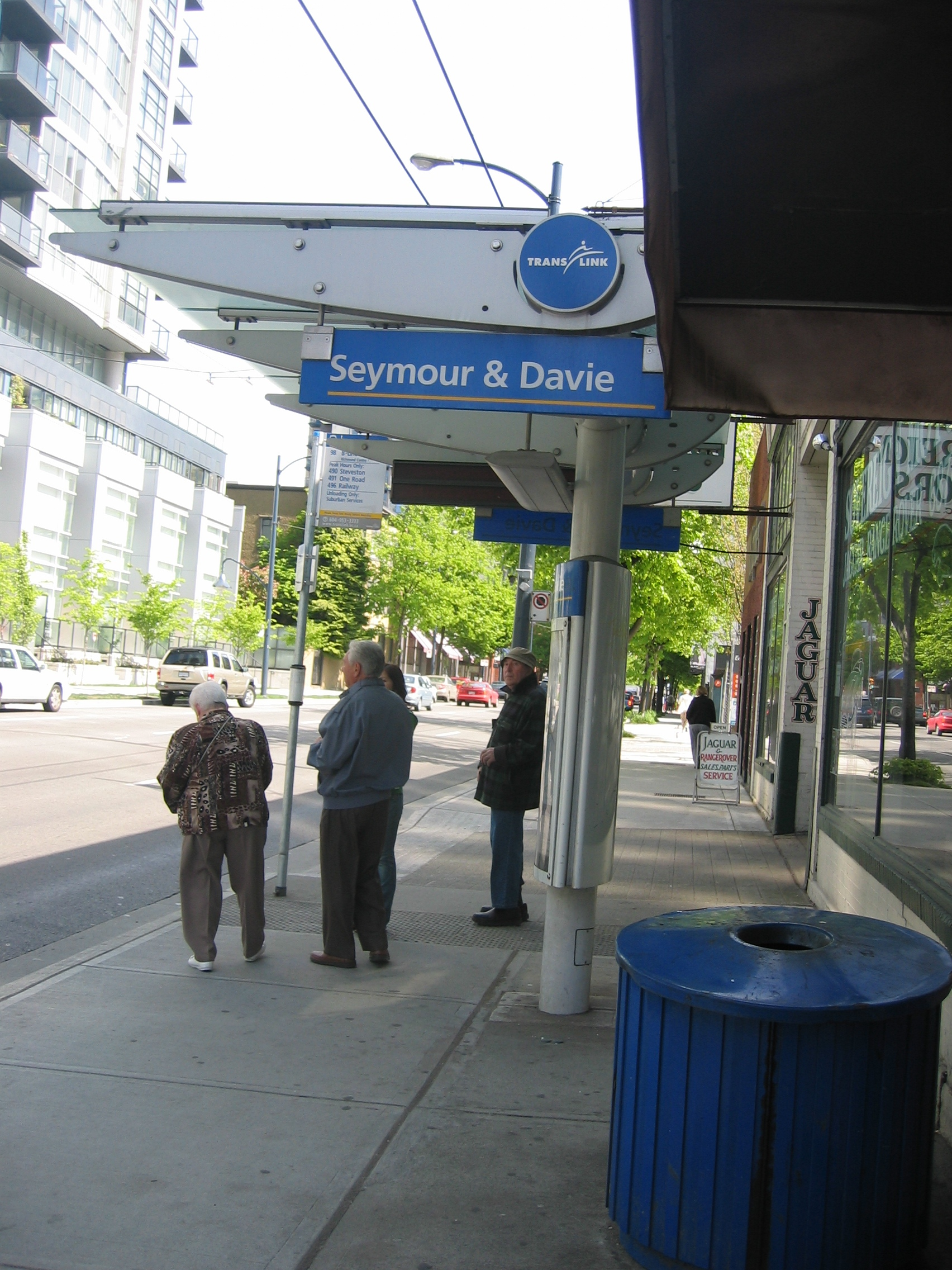
A typical 98 B-Line stop (from Seymour & Davie)

The project cost approximately CA$52 million to build; this included the price of new vehicles, the construction of a dedicated bus lane in Richmond, installing new bus shelters, automated on-board announcements and similar technology, transit priority systems for traffic lights and a share of the new Richmond bus depot, as the old Vancouver Oakridge depot could not accommodate the longer 18-metre (60 ft) articulated buses used on the route. The line opened as far as Sea Island on September 4, 2000, later extending from Airport Station into central Richmond in August 2001.

The introduction of the B-Line eliminated most other local bus services that travelled between Richmond and Vancouver, requiring a transfer between buses for most commuters. As a result of the added transfer and quicker travel times of the B-Line that did not materialize, commute times for passengers increased even though a commute time savings of several minutes had been promised. Within a few years, this prompted improved rush hour services on remaining Richmond to Vancouver routes.

The B-line was one of the most used routes in the TransLink system. In early 2001, the Richmond/Airport-Vancouver Rapid Transit Project feasibility study, which examined replacing the 98 B-Line with light rail, held open houses. This proposed line's working name was the "RAV Line" (Richmond–Airport–Vancouver). The estimated cost of $1.72 billion generated much controversy. Richmond city council, which favoured an at-grade line within the city limits for aesthetic reasons, also threatened the project. However, the city backed down because an elevated line was both preferred by the public, and offered faster trip times and lower operating costs. The TransLink board twice rejected the project because board members representing the northeast areas of Greater Vancouver wanted a line built to Coquitlam. The "RAV Line" project was saved after the board agreed to build both lines by 2010. While not part of the 2010 Winter Olympics in Vancouver, the Canada Line, completed in August 2009, replaced the 98 B-Line.

Beginning in February 2008, 98 B-Line route passengers with valid proof of payment were permitted to board using any of the three doors at any stop. To facilitate this, the bus driver controlled the operation of all three doors at each of the stops. Passengers paying cash or validating FareSavers had to board through the front door.

The 98 B-Line was discontinued on September 7, 2009, two and a half weeks after the Canada Line opened. Afterwards, the #10 Hastings/Downtown/Granville bus began running more frequently along Granville street to compensate.

== Features ==
The 98 featured GPS technology, automated stop announcements, specialized bus stop displays that showed the amount of time until the next bus arrives, and special traffic light signals that sustained green lights long enough for buses to pass through.

In Richmond, the 98 B-Line followed a dedicated bus lane separated from mainstream traffic on No. 3 Road, between the Lansdowne and Sea Island Way stops. On February 13, 2006, the 98 B-Line's bus lane in Richmond was closed as utility crews prepared for the construction of the Canada Line along No. 3 Road. Between February 2006 until its discontinuation in September 2009, the 98 B-Line travelled with regular traffic.

== 98 B-Line stops and transfer points ==
=== Downtown Vancouver ===
- Seymour & Davie – Served the upscale Yaletown neighbourhood. (Note: The bus's destination sign changes to "98 B-Line: Richmond Centre" at this point.)
- Seymour & Smithe – Served the nightclub area on Granville Street, a block to the west. It is also the stop for street youth hostels in the area and the Orpheum Theatre.
- Granville Station – Transfer point to the SkyTrain system and suburban routes to North Vancouver and West Vancouver. Also served Pacific Centre, Hudson Bay Company, and major commercial district as well as the Vancouver Public Library, which is several blocks to the east.
- Waterfront Station – Transfer point to the SkyTrain terminus for both the Expo and Millennium Lines, as well as the SeaBus to Lonsdale Quay in North Vancouver. It is also the western terminus of the West Coast Express.
- Burrard Station – This was the Vancouver terminus for the 98 B-Line, though it did not make a layover. Located in the middle of the financial district. Transfer point to the SkyTrain system as well as to suburban routes to Burnaby, North Vancouver, Surrey, Delta, White Rock, Coquitlam and Port Moody.
- Burrard & Robson – Served the Robson Street shopping district.
- Nelson & Hornby – Formerly known as Nelson & Howe, before the stop was moved. Stopped in front of One Wall Centre. Also served the provincial law courts.
- Howe & Davie – Served the hospitality district near False Creek. Also a transfer point to buses and community shuttles to Davie Village.

=== Vancouver ===
- 5th Avenue – Served the southern False Creek area as well as Granville Island.
- Broadway – Transfer point to the 99 B-Line as well as many trolley routes. It is a short distance away from Vancouver General Hospital and is also the transfer point for those going to Kitsilano.
- King Edward – Transfer point to the #25 bus, which served the affluent Shaughnessy area, University, and North Burnaby. B.C. Children's Hospital and B.C. Women's Hospital were a short distance away from the stop
- 41st Avenue – Transfer point to the #41 bus, which served the Kerrisdale area, particularly the shopping district, and the Oakridge area. Also served as transfer point to the #43 bus, which is an express version of the #41, but only runs during peak hours, and the #480, which is an express bus from Richmond Centre to UBC Loop.
- 49th Avenue – Transfer point to the #49 bus, which operates eastbound to nearby Langara College and terminating at Metropolis at Metrotown, the biggest shopping mall in the province. During peak hours, the route's western terminus is at University of British Columbia, instead of Dunbar Loop.
- 70th Avenue – Served the Marpole neighbourhood and acts as a transfer point to the #100 bus (which travels along Marine Drive).

=== Richmond ===
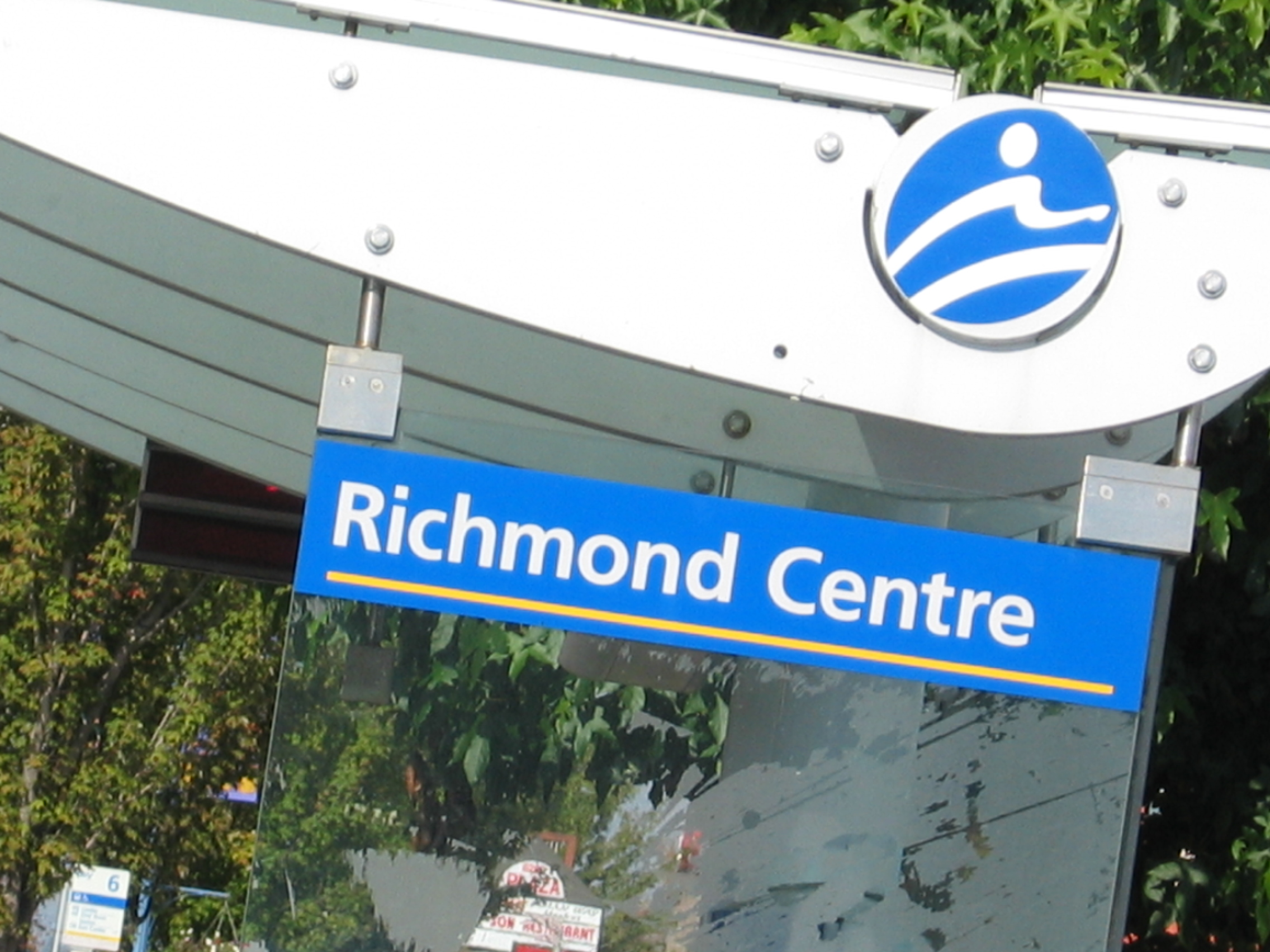
The stop for Richmond Centre

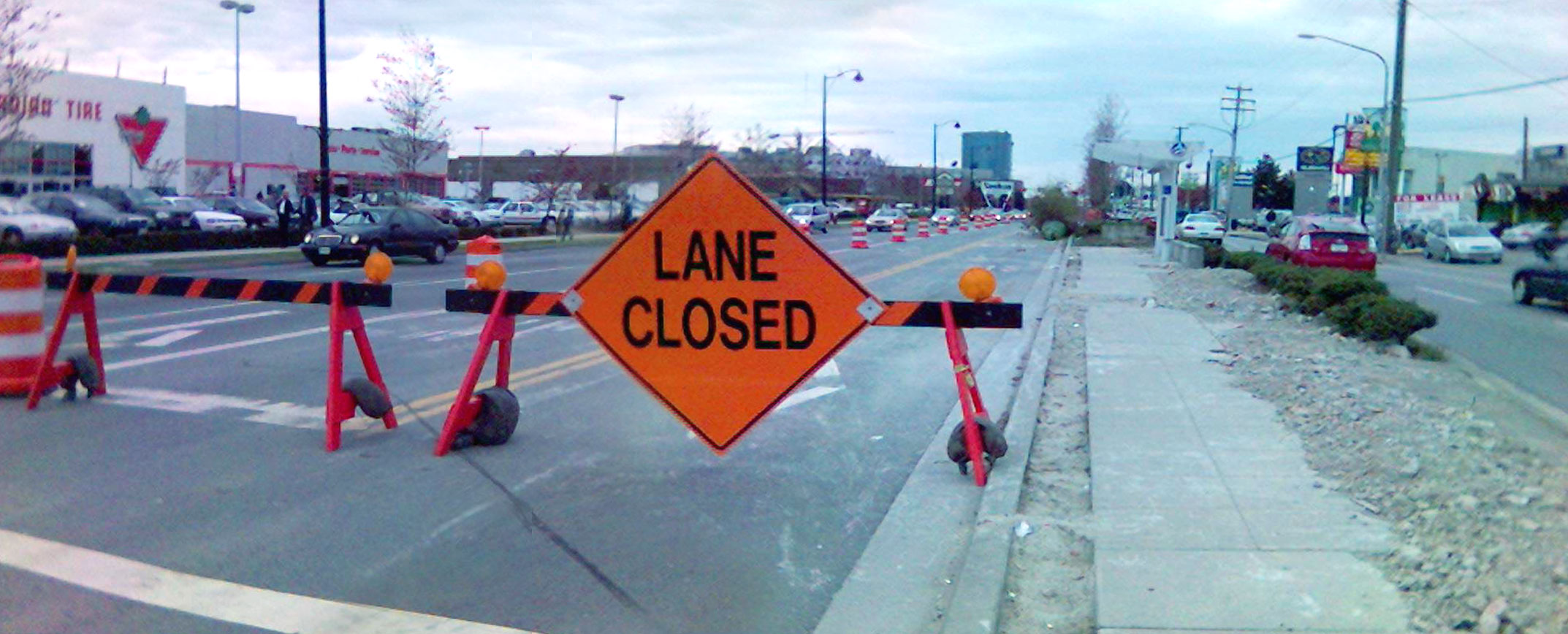
Demolition of the former 98 B-Line busway between Sea Island Way and Lansdowne stations on No. 3 Road, in preparation for the construction of the Canada Line

- Airport Station – Transfer point to the #424 bus, which was a shuttle to Vancouver International Airport's main terminal. Also served the Burkeville neighbourhood of Sea Island, and was a transfer point to the #620 bus to the Tsawwassen ferry terminal. Airport Station was closed the same day the 98 B-Line was discontinued.
- Sea Island Way – Served River Rock Casino, the largest casino in Metro Vancouver.
- Capstan Way – Served Yaohan Centre, Union Square Shopping Centre, and also the Asian shopping district along Capstan Way itself.
- Aberdeen – Served the main Golden Village Asian shopping district, including Aberdeen Centre, Empire Centre, Parker Place, President Plaza, and south side of Yaohan Centre.
- Alderbridge – Served the northern part of the Lansdowne Centre shopping mall as well as the Alexandra Road restaurant district.
- Lansdowne – Served the southern part of Lansdowne Centre and the Richmond campus of Kwantlen Polytechnic University
- Westminster Highway – Popular transfer point to the #401 and #407 buses to Steveston along No. 1 Road and Gilbert Road, respectively. Many passengers used those routes to reach Richmond Hospital and the headquarters of WorkSafe B.C., the workers' compensation and safety board.
- Richmond Centre – The unofficial terminus of the line (because the bus's destination signs read "98 RICHMOND CENTRE"). Stops outside of the Richmond Centre shopping mall and is the main transfer point to almost all of the bus routes in Richmond.
- Brighouse – The southern terminus of the line. Served the Richmond City Hall and the Brighouse area (particularly the Minoru cultural centre, which is home to the Richmond Public Library, the local skating rink and the local swimming pool.)

== Route notes ==
- For early morning and late evening trips, the 98 B-Line provided local non-express service between the Brighouse stop and the Richmond Transit Centre, along No. 3 Road (south of Granville Avenue) and Steveston Highway (until Shell Road). The buses going back to Richmond Transit Centre were signed "98 To Steveston & Shell B-Line".
- On Mondays to Fridays, during peak hours, 98 B-Line service between Vancouver and Airport Station was supplemented by the #496 Railway/Burrard Station and #491 One Road/Burrard Station express routes. The #490 Steveston/Burrard Station express route also did this but went to Highway 99 via Marpole Loop instead of Airport Station.
- Non-express service was also provided along some of the 98 B-Line's corridors, via the #10 Granville/Downtown (along Granville Street) and #410 Railway/22nd Street Station (between the Aberdeen and Brighouse stops) routes in Vancouver and Richmond, respectively.

== See also ==
- Canada Line
- Millennium Line
- Expo Line
- R1 King George Blvd (formerly 96 B-Line)
- R4 41st Ave
- R5 Hastings St (formerly 95 B-Line)
- 97 B-Line
- 99 B-Line
- List of bus routes in Metro Vancouver
