= Vessi =

Footwear company

Vessi Footwear Ltd.
- Company type: Limited company
- Industry: Retail Apparel and Fashion
- Founded: 2018
- Founder: Mikaella Go, Tony Yu, Andy Wang
- Headquarters: Vancouver, British Columbia, Canada
- Number of locations: 4
- Website: vessi.com

Vessi is a Canadian footwear company based in Vancouver known for creating waterproof knit shoes, made with patented Dyma-tex technology. Originally selling online only, it opened its first retail store in 2022 at Metropolis at Metrotown in Burnaby, British Columbia and second at CF Richmond Centre in 2024.
