= Richmond Hospital =

- Vancouver Coastal Health Authority

Geography
- Location: 7000 Westminster Highway, Richmond, British Columbia, Canada
- Coordinates: 49°10′07″N 123°08′49″W

Organization
- Care system: Public Medicare (Canada)
- Type: Community, Urban, Teaching
- Affiliated university: UBC Faculty of Medicine

Services
- Emergency department: Level III trauma centre
- Beds: 200

History
- Founded: 1966

Links
- Website: www.vch.ca/en/location/richmond-hospital
- Lists: Hospitals in Canada

Richmond Hospital (RH) is a general hospital in Richmond, British Columbia, Canada. The Vancouver Coastal Health Authority (VCH) is responsible for Richmond Health Services and Richmond Hospital.

== History ==
Richmond Hospital first opened on February 26, 1966, with 132 beds, and was first known as Richmond General Hospital. The first patient was admitted and the first baby was born in the hospital on March 17, 1966. The original building is now known as the "North Tower"; the "South Tower" was completed in 1980. In 1992, Richmond General Hospital was rebranded as "The Richmond Hospital". Minoru Residence extended care facility was opened two years later.

In 1997, the Westminster Health Centre building was opened to house administration, psychiatry and ambulatory care. The same year the hospital was amalgamated with the Vancouver/Richmond Health Board. In 1999, due to space opened up by opening the Westminster building, the Emergency Department and Diagnostic Imaging were considerably expanded.

In 2001, the Vancouver/Richmond Health Board was re-structured to become part of the Vancouver Coastal Health Authority, which includes "Richmond Health Services" as the local umbrella organization. The hospital is currently part of Richmond Health Services and is now known simply as "Richmond Hospital" (without the preceding "The").

== Facilities and amenities ==
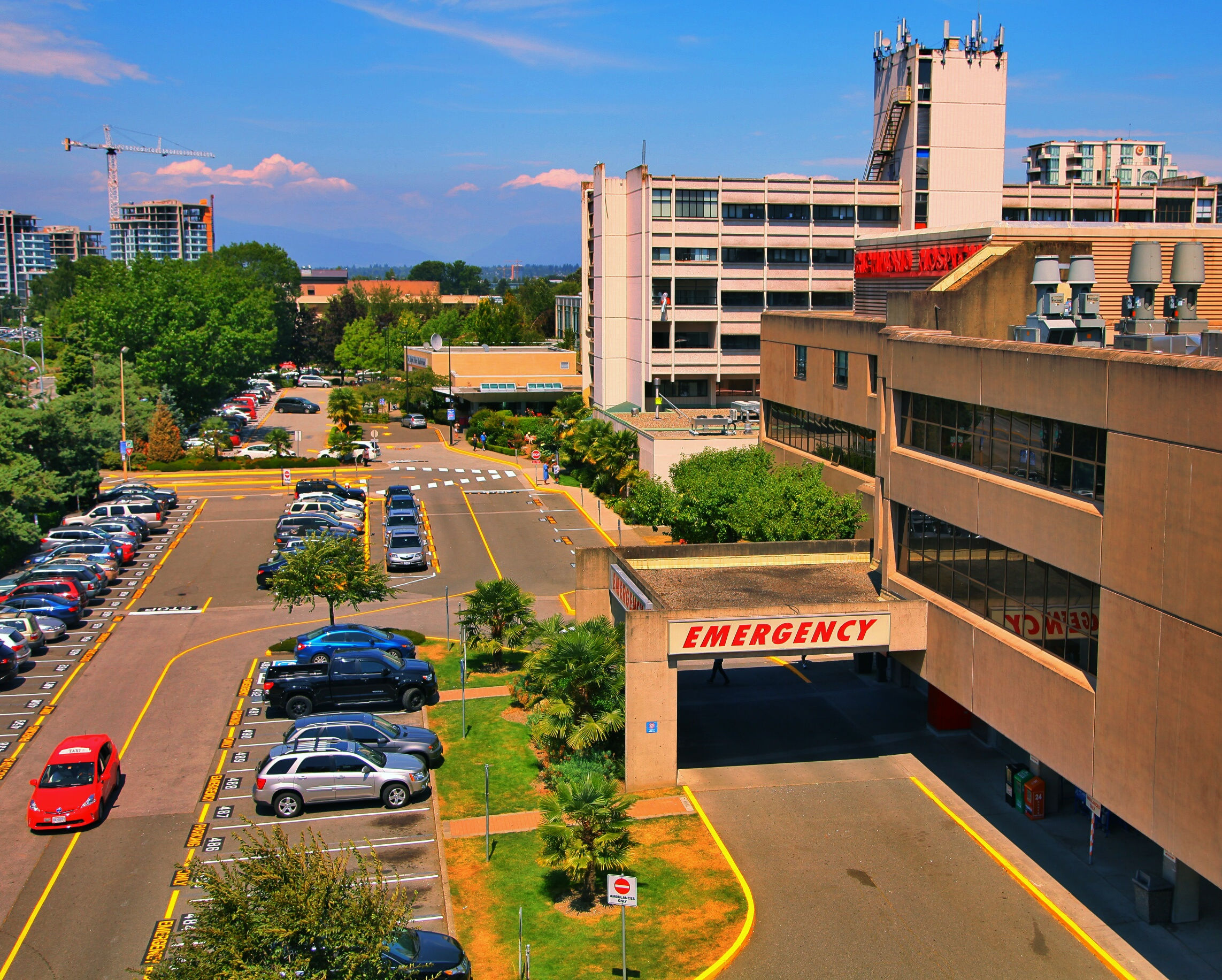
Richmond Hospital

Richmond Hospital is the only hospital in Richmond, British Columbia, and is a large community hospital with 200 beds serving the needs of residents in Richmond, Delta, as well as travelers using the Vancouver International Airport and BC Ferries. It is a teaching hospital affiliated with the University of British Columbia. The Emergency Department is classified as a Level 3 trauma centre, opens 24/7, and sees more than 50,000 patients annually. The hospital can provide most of the medical and surgical care for its patients. Some patients requiring highly specialized care would need to be transferred to tertiary care facilities in Vancouver. Richmond Hospital has transfer agreements and policies with Vancouver General Hospital, St. Paul's Hospital, British Columbia's Children's Hospital, and BC Women's Hospital and Health Centre.

In addition to an established inpatient psychiatry unit and outpatient psychiatry services, a Psychiatric Emergency Unit was completed in March 2009 for short-term admission of psychiatric patients in crisis.

In September 2009, the new $6.5 million birth centre opened. It features 15 private maternity care rooms, a six-bed Neonatal Intensive Care Unit and a maternity-specific operating room and recovery area.

On April 8, 2009, the provincial government announced a $10 million upgrade package for RH. These renovations were completed in April 2011 and include a 2,000-square-foot (190 m^{2}) expansion and upgrade to the Emergency Department ($4.9 million), expansion of ambulatory surgical services ($2.9 million) and an expansion and upgrade of the Sterile Processing Department ($2.4 million).

Non-medical amenities and enhancements include a large atrium inside the main entrance where one can find a Starbucks and a gift shop. There is a cafeteria on the second floor. There are several well-maintained gardens on the hospital property. The hospital is right beside Minoru Park which has many footpaths, trees and several small lakes.

In April 2014, work began on a $2 million renovation to the atrium area inside the main hospital entrance. It is funded almost entirely by the Milan and Maureen Ilich Foundation and scheduled for completion in August 2014. The Westminster Health Centre building and the renovated atrium area will be renamed the Milan Ilich Pavilion. The reconfigured space will become a hub for information and services and include a new admitting desk, a dedicated family and patient centre and a simpler way-finding strategy. There will even be an expansion of the existing Starbucks outlet.

=== Future Expansion plans ===
In March 2018, the ministry announced a new acute-care building for the hospital. The new building shall include more beds and alleviate the concerns that the original building shall collapse due to seismic activity. In July 2020, the province announced that the building will be bigger than the one announced in 2018. In addition to the acute tower, it shall include an expanded emergency room, ICU, pharmacy, pediatric unit, and surgical suit. It will also add 113 new beds. Completion of the business plan for the project is expected in September 2020, with construction starting soon after. It is due to open in 2024.

== Services ==
- Emergency (open 24/7)
- Ambulatory Care
- Cardiopulmonary/Neurodiagnostics
- Children's and Women's Health (including labour and delivery, maternity, gynecology, pediatrics and a neonatal intensive care unit)
- Diagnostics (laboratory and diagnostic imaging)
- Integrated Palliative Care Program
- Intensive Care and Coronary Care
- Maternity
- Medicine (includes cardiology, gastroenterology, respiratory, rheumatology, neurology, geriatrics, infectious diseases, medical oncology and sleep disorders)
- Cancer Care Clinic
- Pediatrics
- Psychiatry
- Rehabilitation
- Surgery (includes general, urology, plastics, ENT, ophthalmology, orthopedics and vascular)

== Transportation ==
Richmond Hospital is located on the southeast corner of Westminster Highway and Gilbert Road, and can be accessed by TransLink Buses 401, 407, and 414. As well, the Canada Line Richmond–Brighouse Station is located three blocks east of the hospital. Located on the southwest corner of the hospital is a multi-storey car park accessible from Gilbert Road. During the COVID-19 pandemic, parking at Richmond Hospital became free for staff and visitors starting April 1, 2020. As of September 2025, it charges $1.75 for half-hour parking, $15 for 24 hours parking, as well as $35.25 and $63.00 for its weekly and monthly parking passes, respectively.
