= Lansdowne station (SkyTrain) =

Metro Vancouver SkyTrain station

Lansdowne
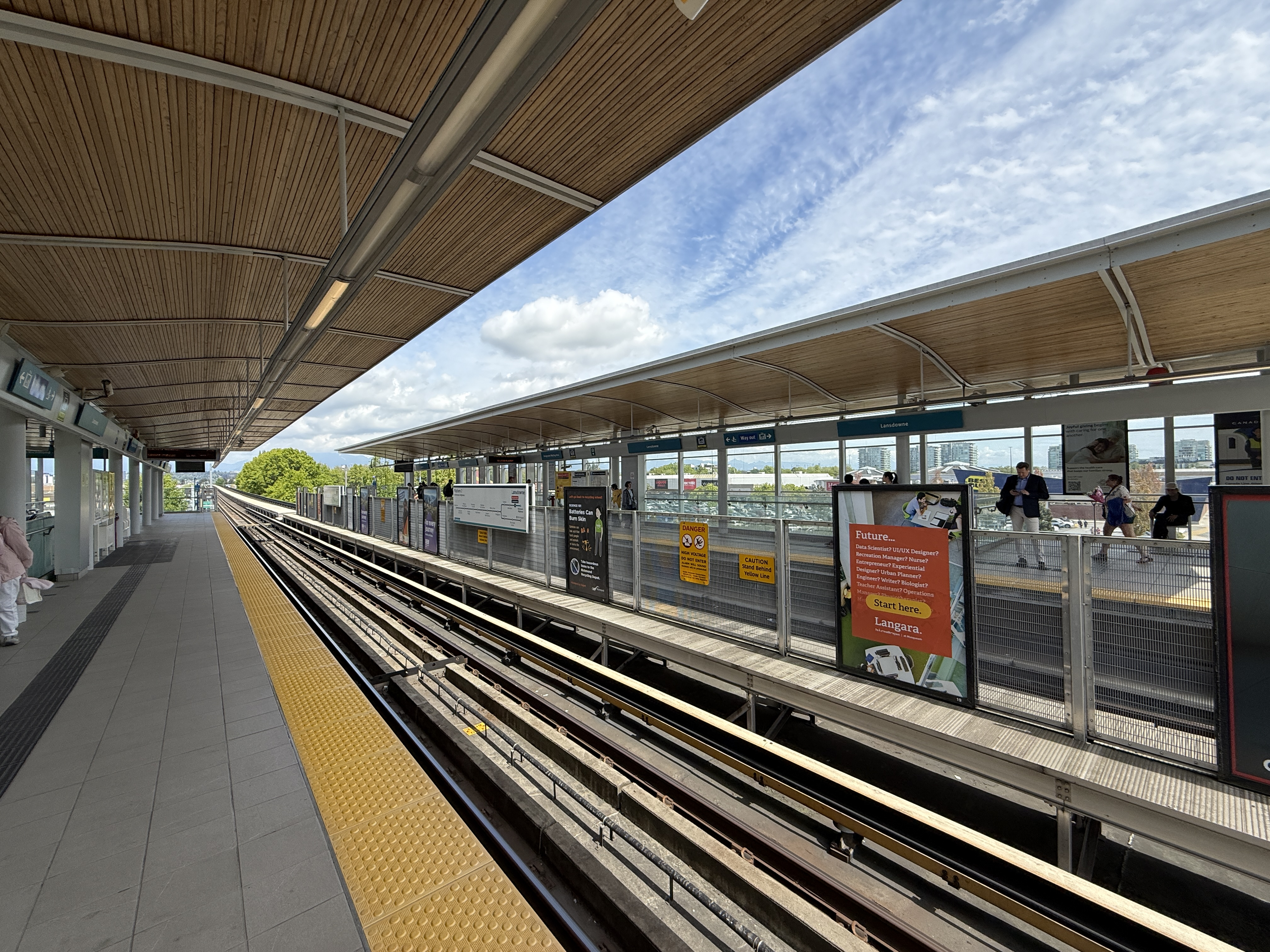
- Platform in 2026

General information
- Location: 5400 No. 3 Road, Richmond, British Columbia
- Coordinates: 49°10′29″N 123°8′11″W
- System: SkyTrain station
- Owner: TransLink
- Platforms: Side platforms
- Tracks: 2

Construction
- Structure type: Elevated
- Accessible: yes

Other information
- Station code: LD
- Fare zone: 2

History
- Opened: August 17, 2009

Passengers
- 2025: 1,567,000 ▼0.6%
- Rank: 33 of 54

Services
Preceding station	TransLink	Following station
Aberdeen towards Waterfront	Canada Line Richmond branch	Richmond–Brighouse Terminus
Location

Lansdowne is an elevated station on the Canada Line of Metro Vancouver's SkyTrain rapid transit system. It is located in Richmond, British Columbia, Canada.

== Location ==
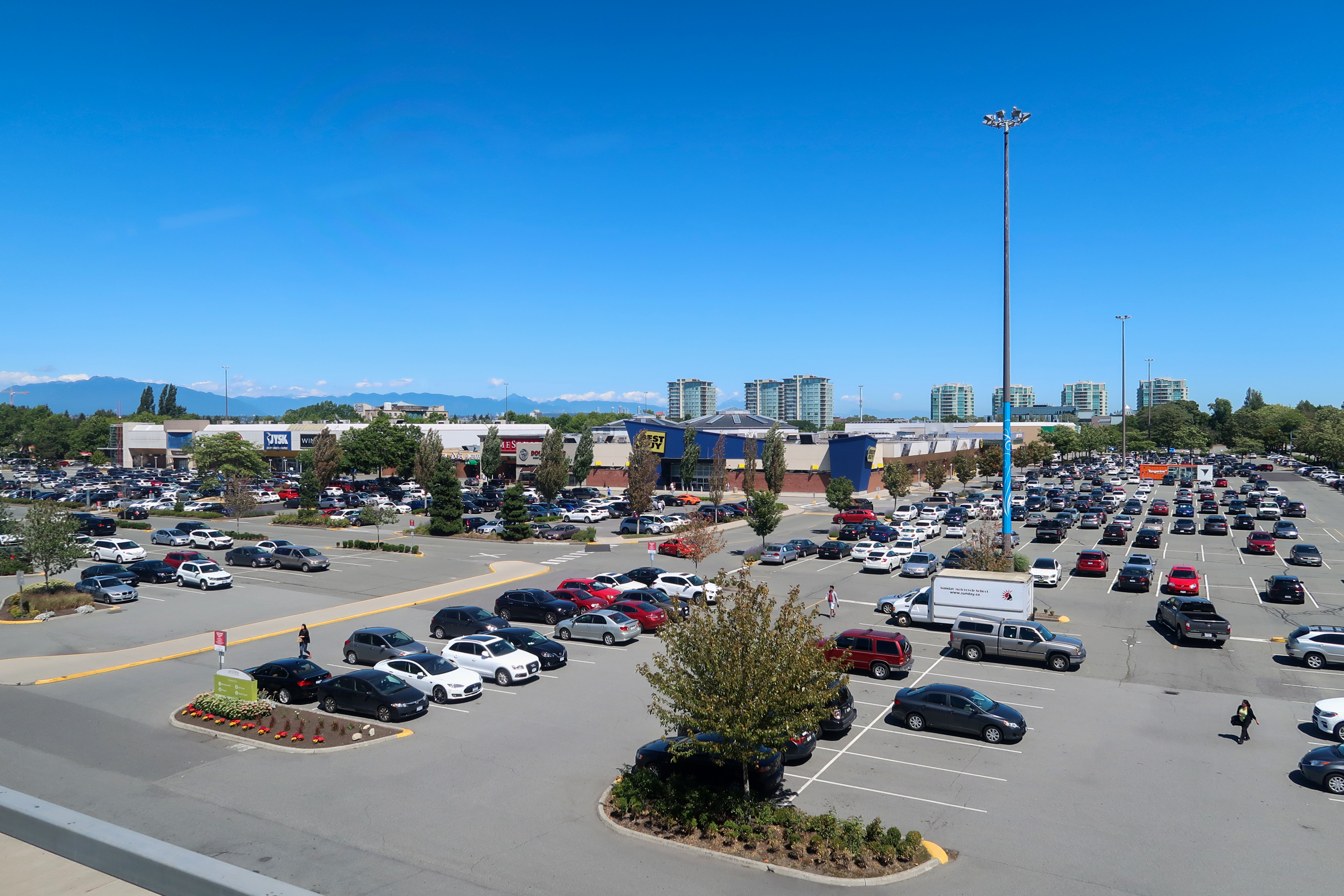
Lansdowne Centre

Lansdowne station is located at the intersection of Lansdowne Road and No. 3 Road. It serves Lansdowne Centre and Kwantlen Polytechnic University, as well as adjacent businesses and residences in the area. It is also the nearest station to the Richmond Olympic Oval, and an extension of Lansdowne Road was used to facilitate pedestrian travel between Lansdowne station and the oval during the 2010 Winter Olympics.

The station was originally to have been located at the intersection of No. 3 Road and Alderbridge Way, and would have been known as "Alderbridge station". The name "Lansdowne" comes from the former use of the site for a horse-racing track, named Lansdowne Park, from the 1920s until the 1960s.

== Bus routes ==
The following bus routes are located nearby:

- 403 Three Road / Bridgeport Station
- 405 Five Road / Cambie
- 407 Gilbert / Bridgeport
- 410 Richmond–Brighouse Station / 22nd Street Station
- 416 Richmond–Brighouse Station / East Cambie
- N10 Richmond–Brighouse Station / Downtown
