= Richmond–Brighouse station =

Metro Vancouver SkyTrain station

Richmond–Brighouse
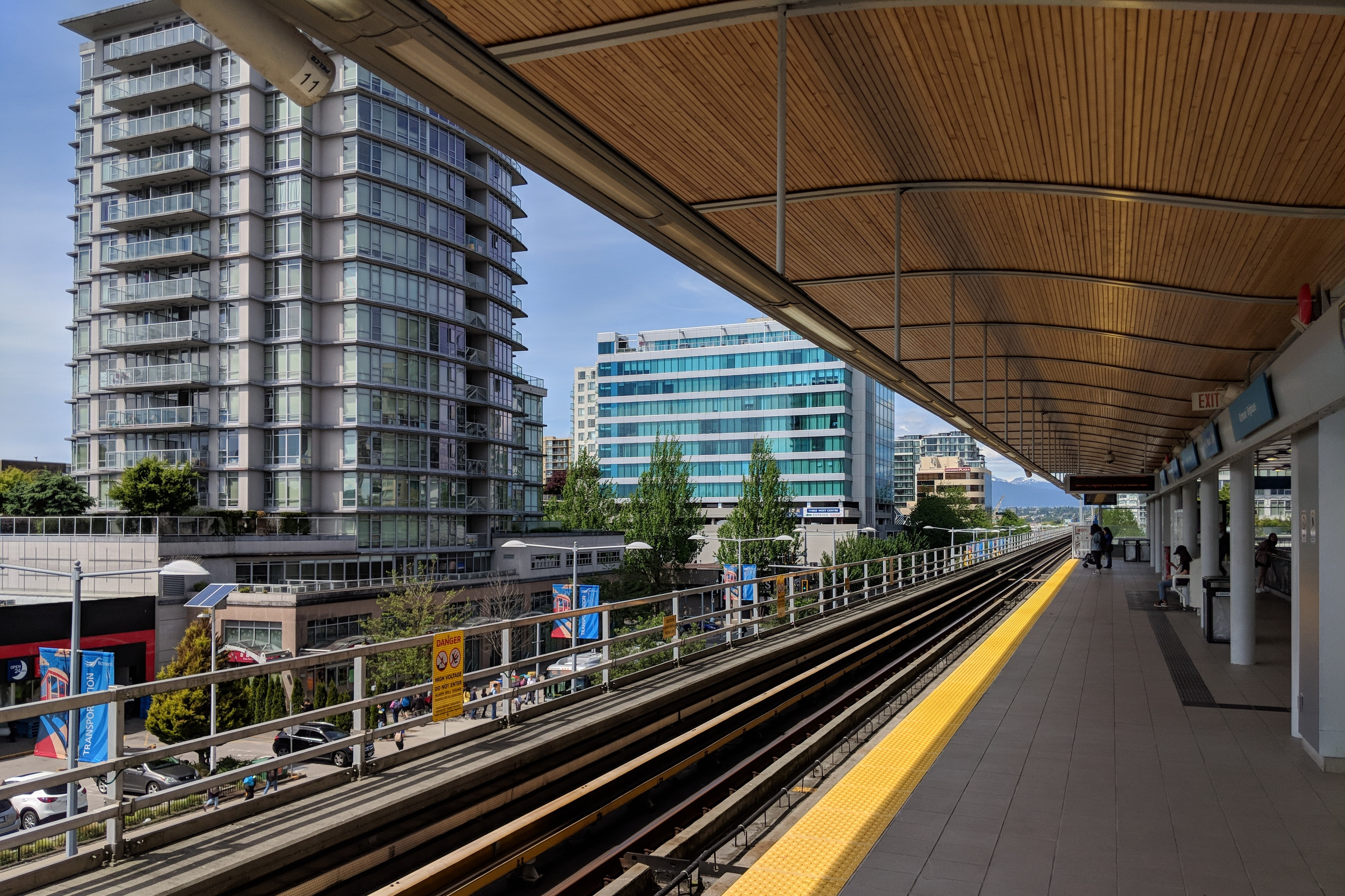
- Platform level at Richmond–Brighouse station

General information
- Location: 6222 No. 3 Road, Richmond
- Coordinates: 49°10′5″N 123°8′11″W
- System: SkyTrain station
- Owner: TransLink
- Platforms: Side platforms
- Tracks: 1

Construction
- Structure type: Elevated
- Parking: No
- Cycle facilities: Yes
- Accessible: Yes
- Architect: VIA Architecture

Other information
- Station code: RB
- Fare zone: 2

History
- Opened: August 17, 2009

Passengers
- 2025: 3,627,000 ▲0.2%
- Rank: 14 of 54

Services
| Preceding station | TransLink | Following station |
|---|---|---|
| Lansdowne towards Waterfront | Canada Line Richmond branch | Terminus |
Location

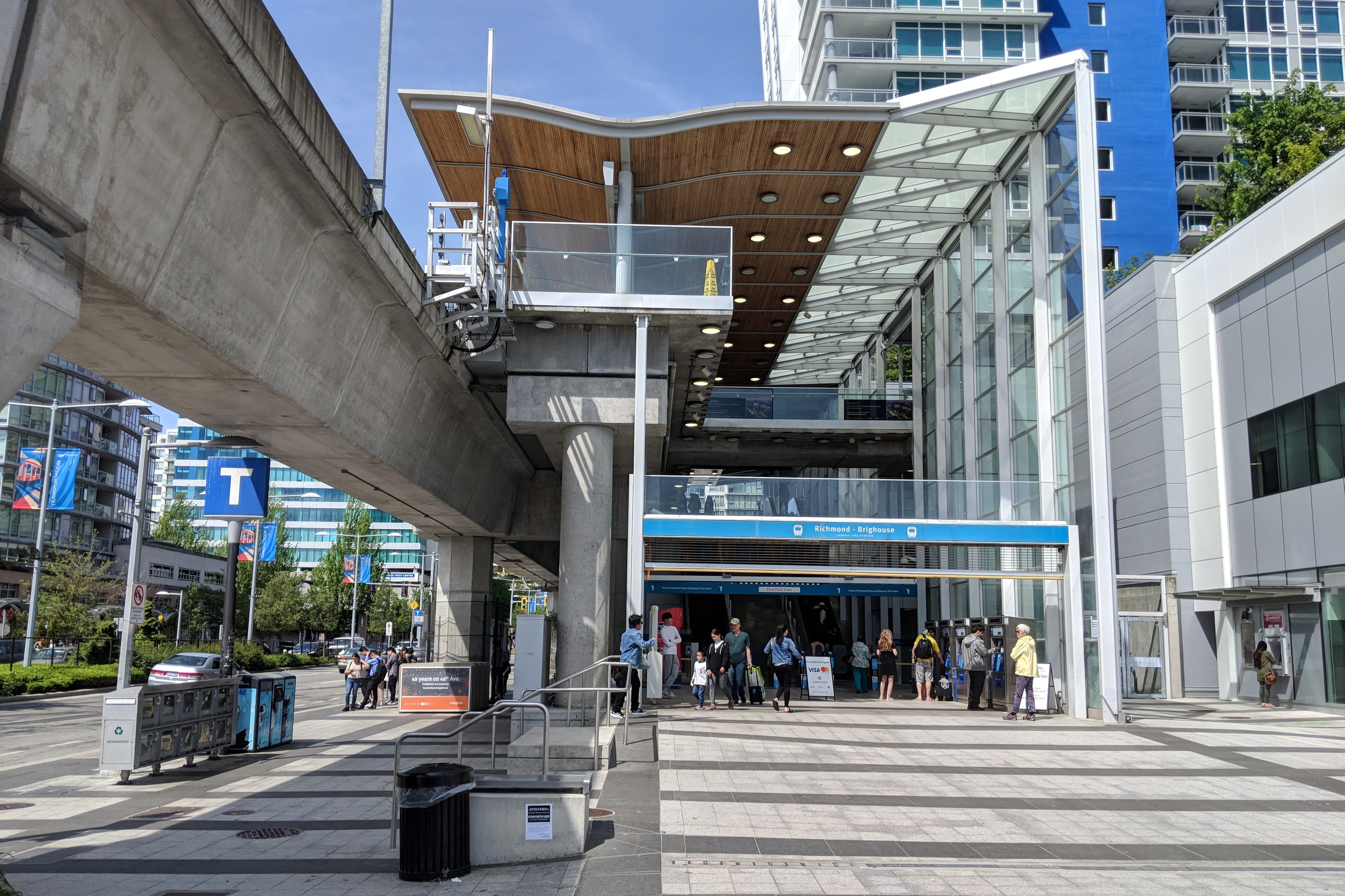
Station entrance

Richmond–Brighouse is an elevated station on the Canada Line of Metro Vancouver's SkyTrain rapid transit system. Located in the Brighouse area of Richmond, British Columbia, Canada, it is one of the outbound terminus stations of the Canada Line, the other being YVR–Airport. Like YVR–Airport, Richmond–Brighouse only has a single track.

The station is located within Richmond's commercial centre, close to the Richmond Centre shopping mall and Richmond City Hall. The station is within a short walking distance of such amenities as Richmond Public Market, Richmond Hospital, and the Minoru civic complex, as well as other nearby offices, commercial, and residential buildings.

== History ==
Richmond–Brighouse station was opened in 2009 along with the rest of the Canada Line and was designed by the architecture firm VIA Architecture. Construction of a new bus loop directly south of the station began in November 2019 and partially opened on October 19, 2020, for the 406 and 408 buses. The exchange was fully opened on November 9, 2020.

== Station name ==
Richmond City Council proposed that the name "Brighouse" be used as the name of the station, since Brighouse is a historic name for the surrounding neighbourhood, thus reflecting the area's heritage. The area was named after an early settler, Samuel Brighouse, who was one of "The Three Greenhorns" of Vancouver. From 1920 until 1941, the area was the location of a horse-racing track known as Brighouse Racetrack.

== Station information ==
=== Entrances ===
Richmond–Brighouse station is served by a single entrance located at the south end of the stationhouse.

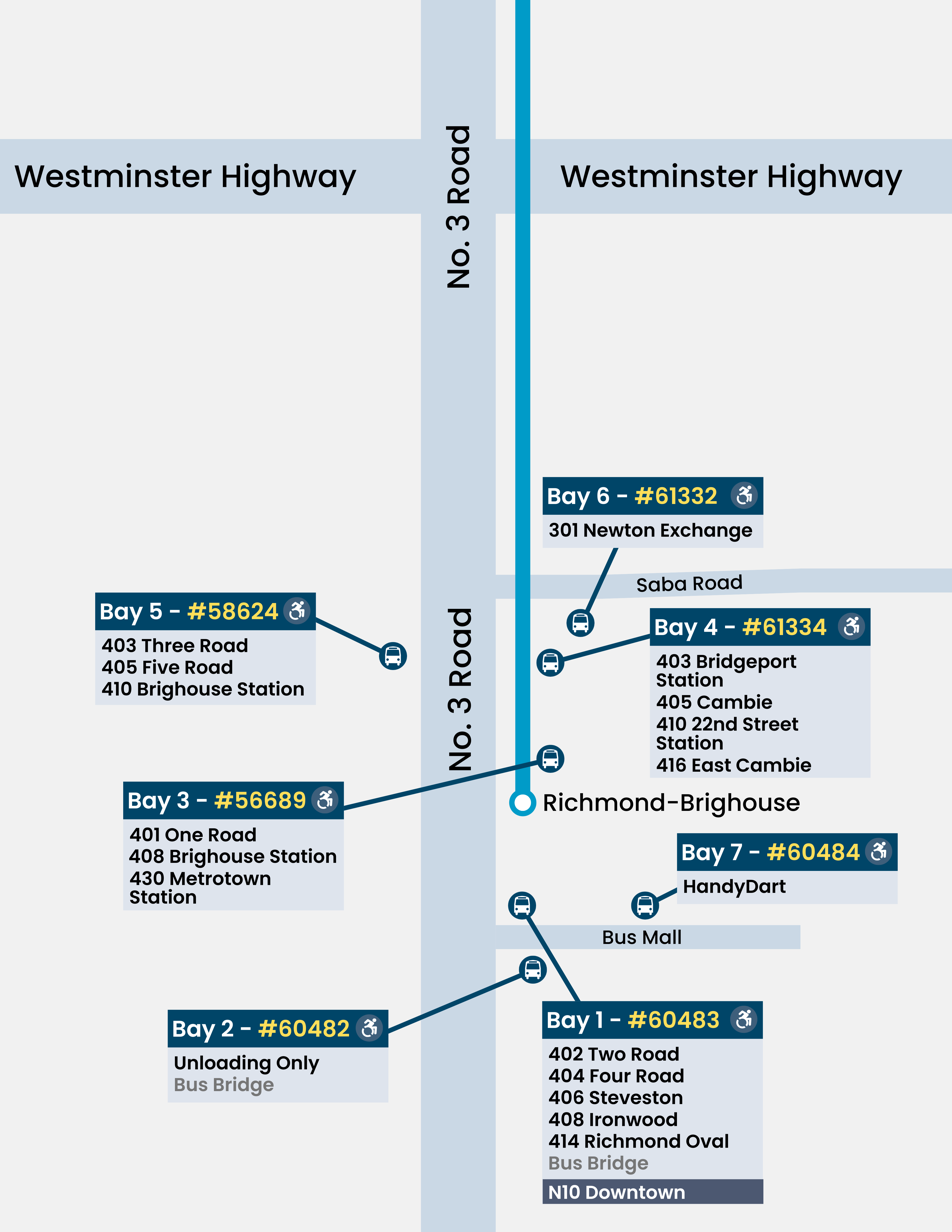
Richmond–Brighouse bus bay map

=== Transit connections ===
An on-street turn-around serves as the terminus for many bus routes that serve the area, and enables a convenient transfer to the Canada Line. A new bus loop replaced the one previously at Richmond Centre.

This new bus loop opened at the station on October 19, 2020, between No. 3 Road and Buswell Street. 6 routes use this bus loop within the exchange as a terminus as of 2025.

Bus bay assignments:

| Bay | Route | Notes |
|---|---|---|
| 1 | 402 Two Road | |
| 1 | 404 Four Road | |
| 1 | 406 Steveston | |
| 1 | 408 Ironwood | To Riverport for evening and most weekend/holiday trips |
| 1 | 414 Richmond Oval | No Sunday/holiday service |
| 1 | N10 Downtown | NightBus service |
| 1 | Bus bridge | |
| 2 | Unloading only | |
| 2 | Bus bridge | |
| 3 | 401 One Road | |
| 3 | 416 East Cambie | Peak hours only |
| 3 | 430 Metrotown Station | Express |
| 4 | 403 Bridgeport Station | |
| 4 | 405 Cambie | Via Vulcan during peak hours |
| 4 | 410 22nd Street Station | Via Fraserwood during peak hours |
| 5 | 403 Three Road | |
| 5 | 405 Five Road | |
| 6 | 301 Newton Exchange | Express; highway coach |
| 7 | — | HandyDART service |
