= Lansdowne Centre =

Shopping mall in Richmond, British Columbia, Canada

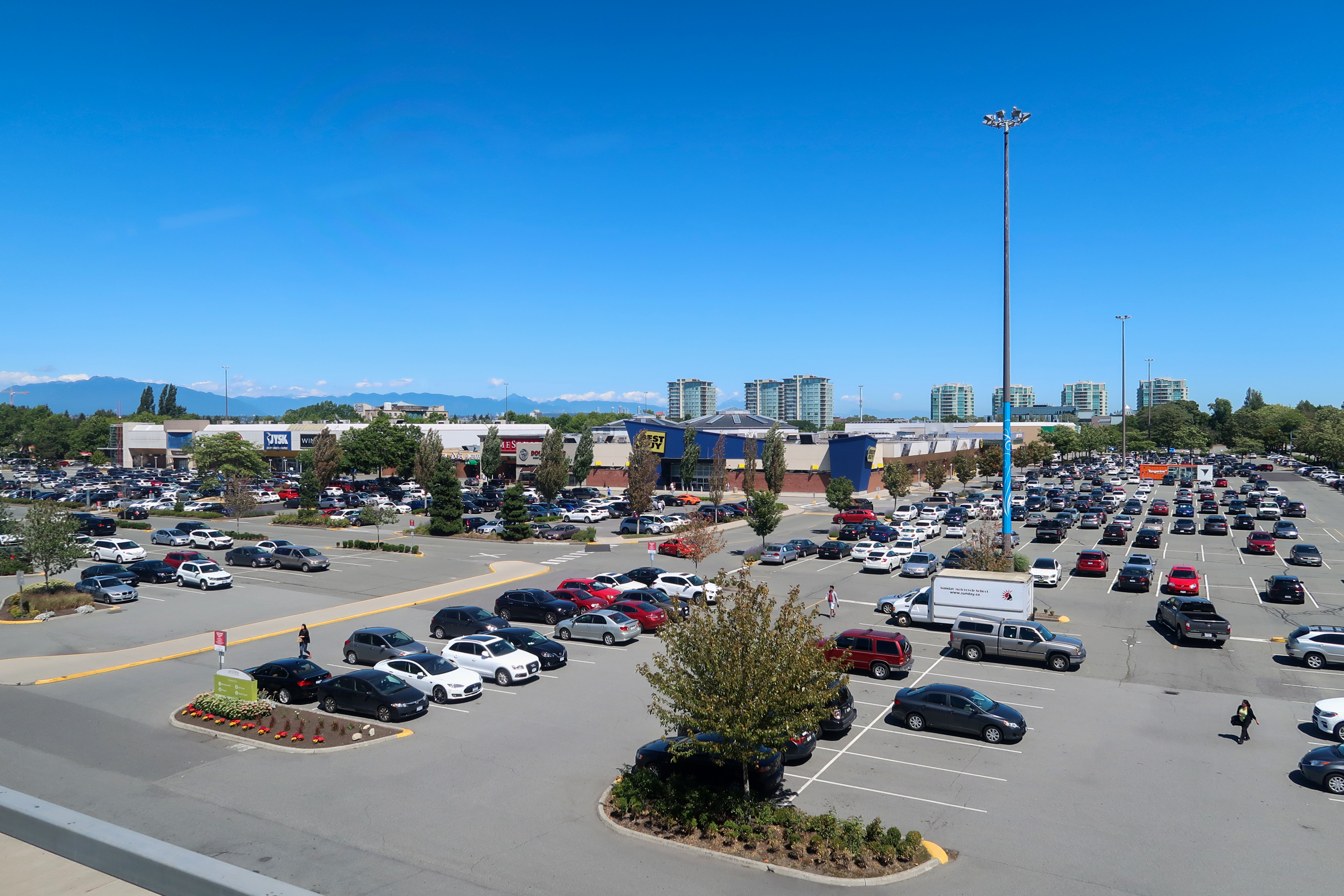
- Lansdowne Centre as seen from the SkyTrain's Canada Line
- Location: Richmond, British Columbia, Canada
- Coordinates: 49.175503°N 123.132513°W
- Address: 5300 No. 3 Road
- Opened: September 14, 1977; 49 years ago
- Owner: Vanprop Investments Ltd.
- Num. of stores: 120+
- Num. of anchor tenants: 6
- Floor area: 56,212 square metres (605,062 sq ft)
- Floors: 2
- Public transit: Lansdowne Station
- Website: lansdowne-centre.com

Lansdowne Centre (formerly Lansdowne Park Shopping Centre) is a shopping mall in Richmond, British Columbia, Canada. It is located on No. 3 Road and is the second-largest mall in Richmond after Richmond Centre. The mall has over 56,000 square metres (600,000 sq ft) of retail space, and the total site, including the parking lot, spans over 20 hectares (50 acres).

== History ==
Previous Logo used until 2025

Lansdowne Centre mall was built on a horse racing track originally called Lansdowne Park. The shopping mall that exists today was constructed in 1977 as Lansdowne Park Shopping Mall, with the now-defunct Woodward's as one of its first tenants.

The mall will be demolished in 2025 as part of a 20-hectare (50-acre) development, consisting of 24 towers.

== Stores ==
The mall has 120+ stores and services. Anchor stores include Best Buy, HomeSense, Jysk, Winners, Dollarama, and T&T Supermarket which replaced Target as a result of the Target Canada failure.

Food chains include A&W, Bubble Waffle Cafe, Grill King, KFC, and Villa Vietnamese.

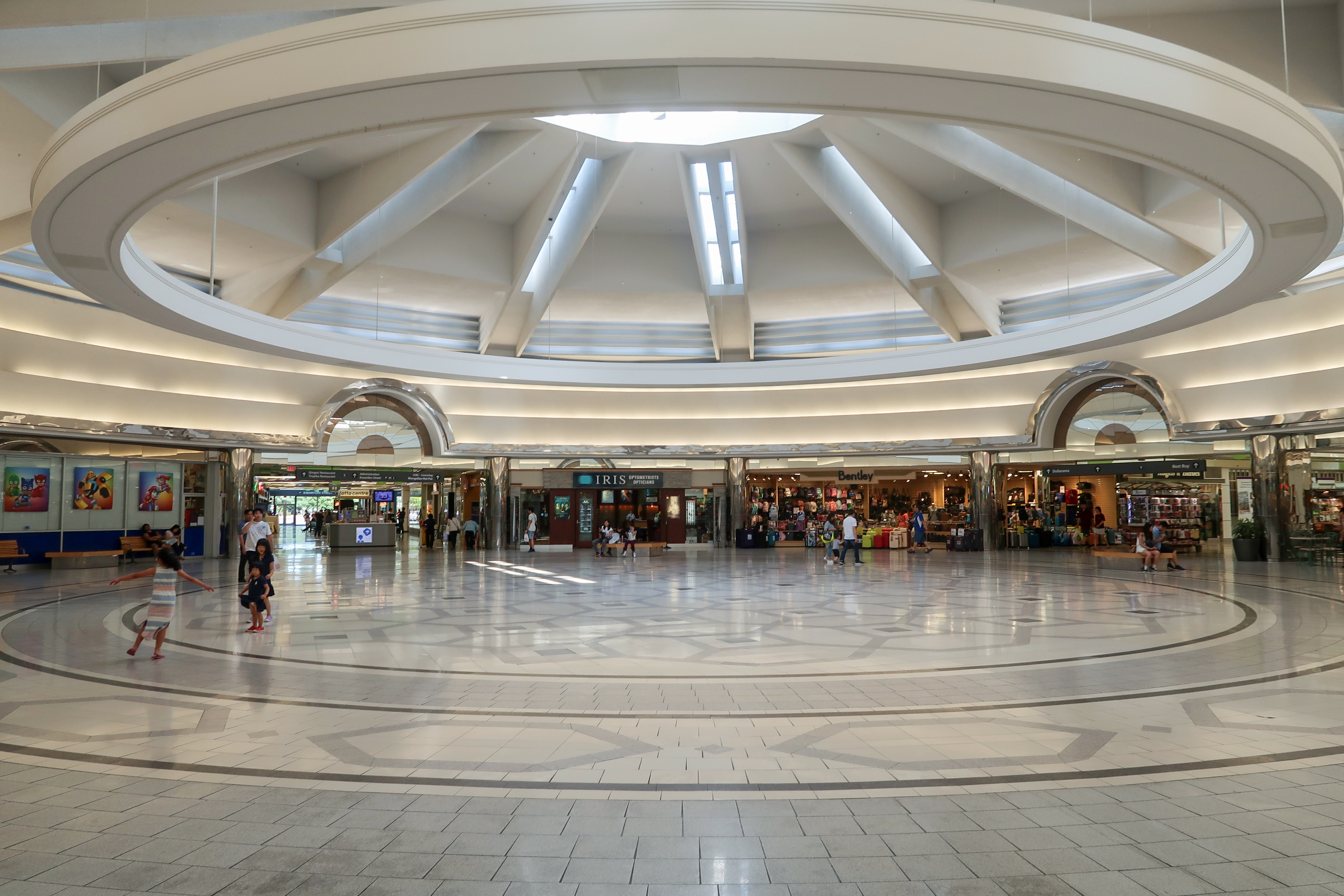
Centre court

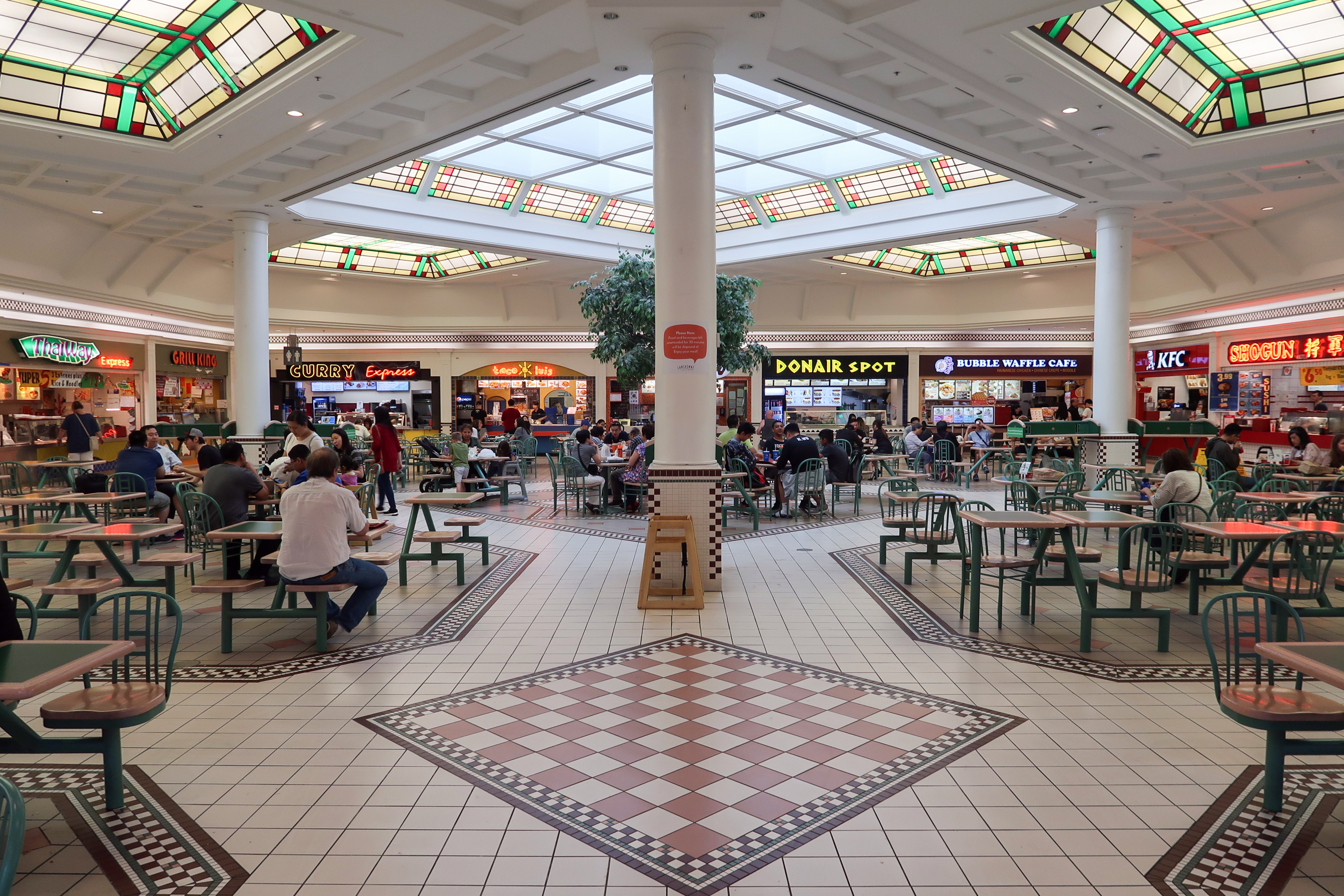
Food court

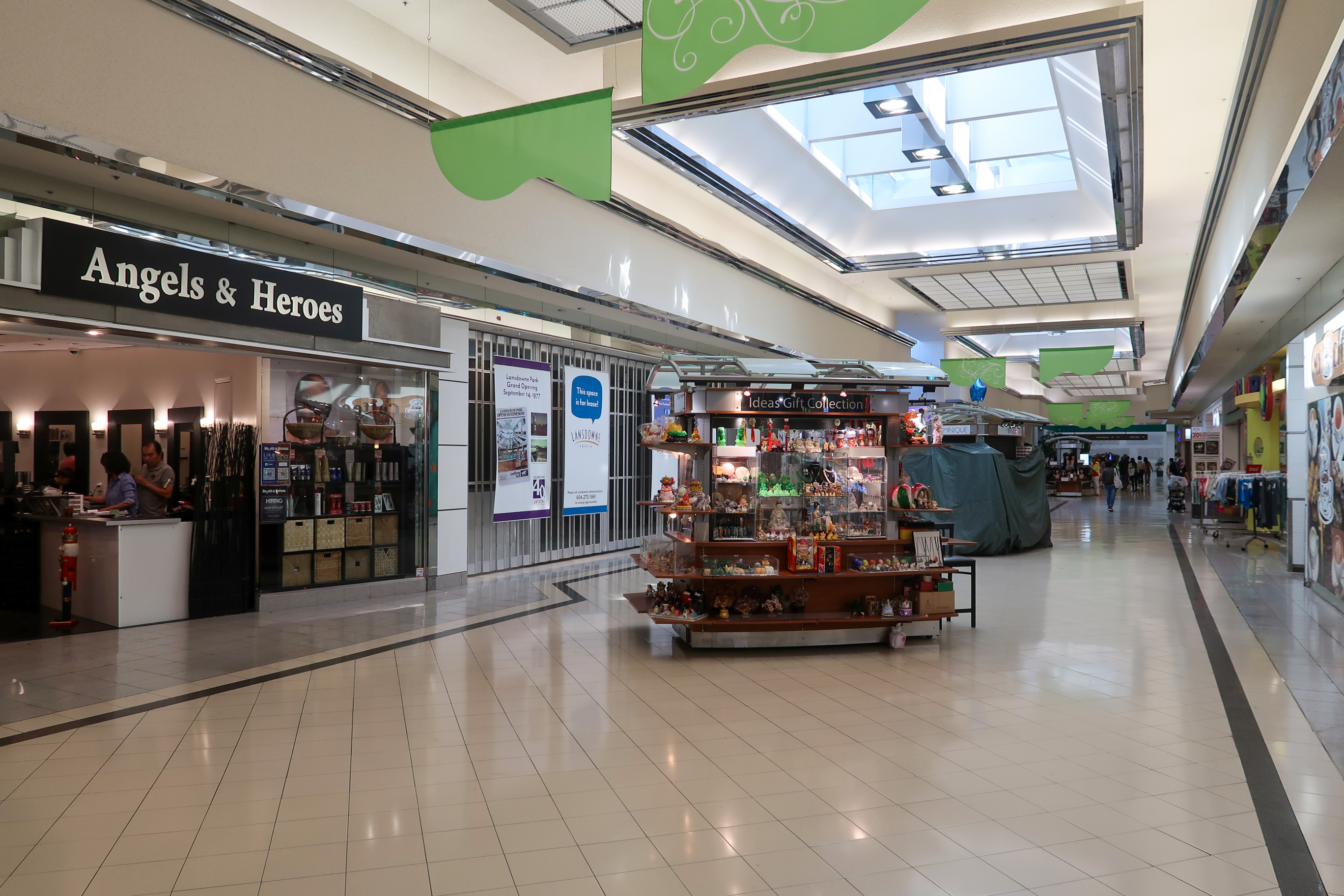
East mall

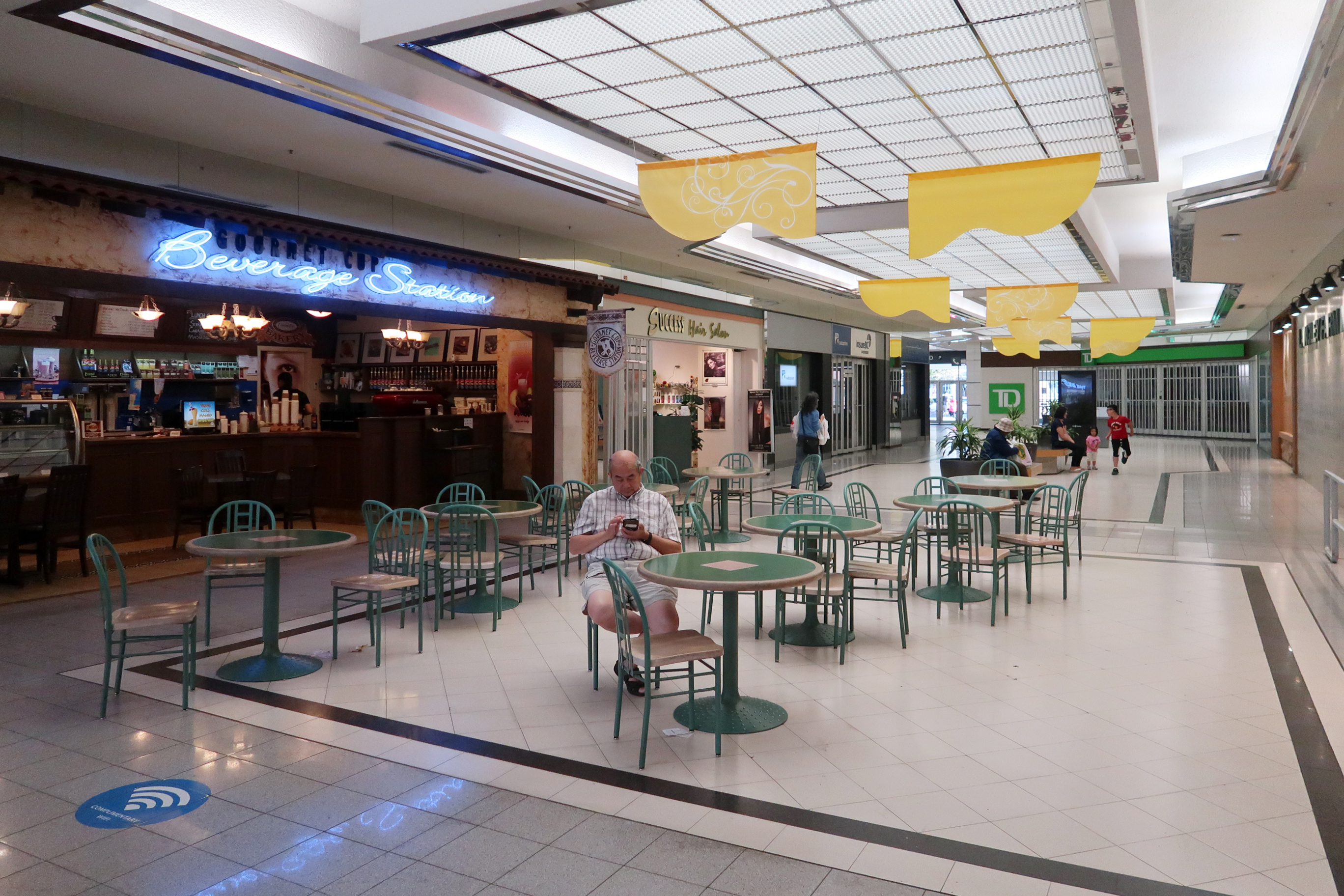
South mall

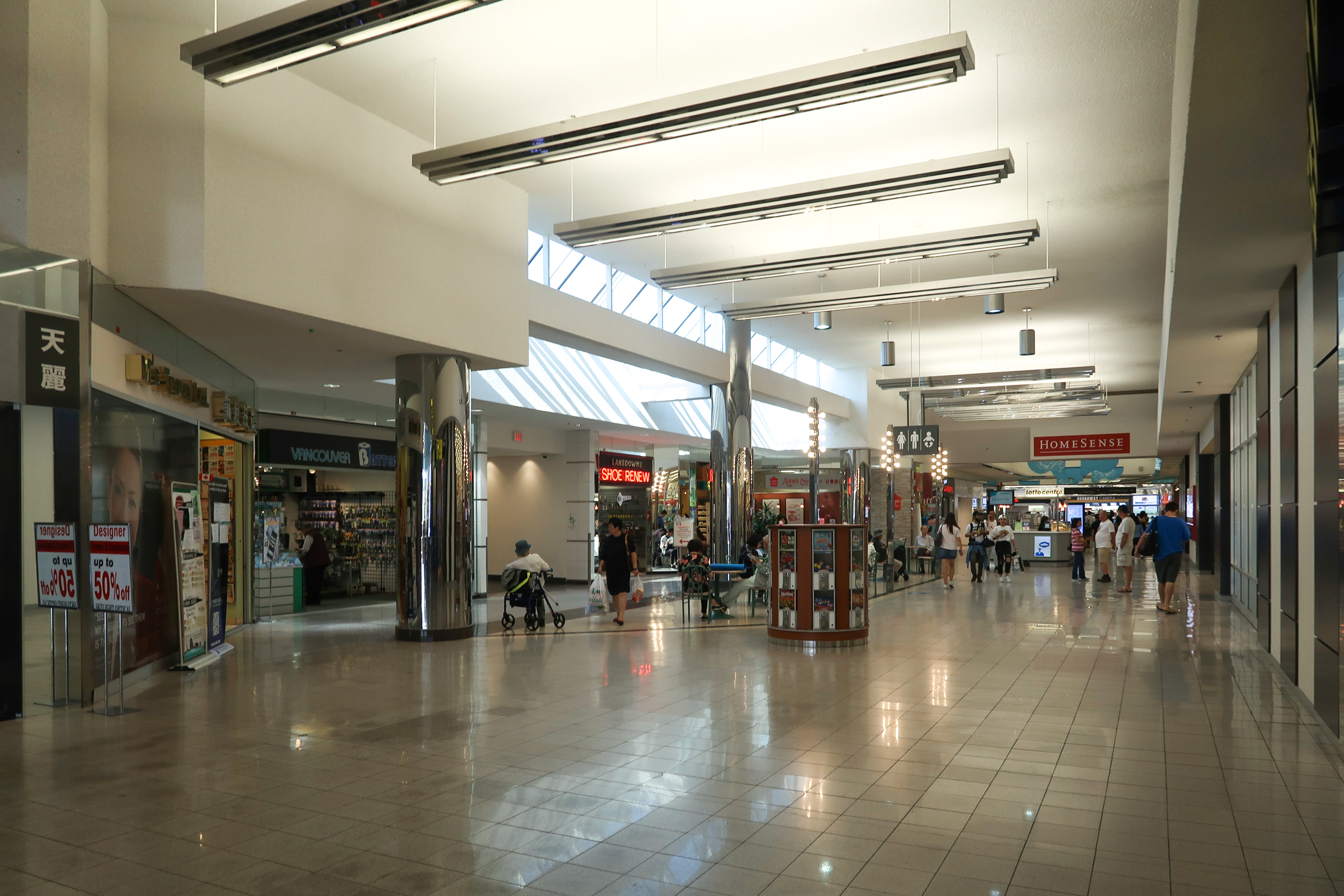
West mall

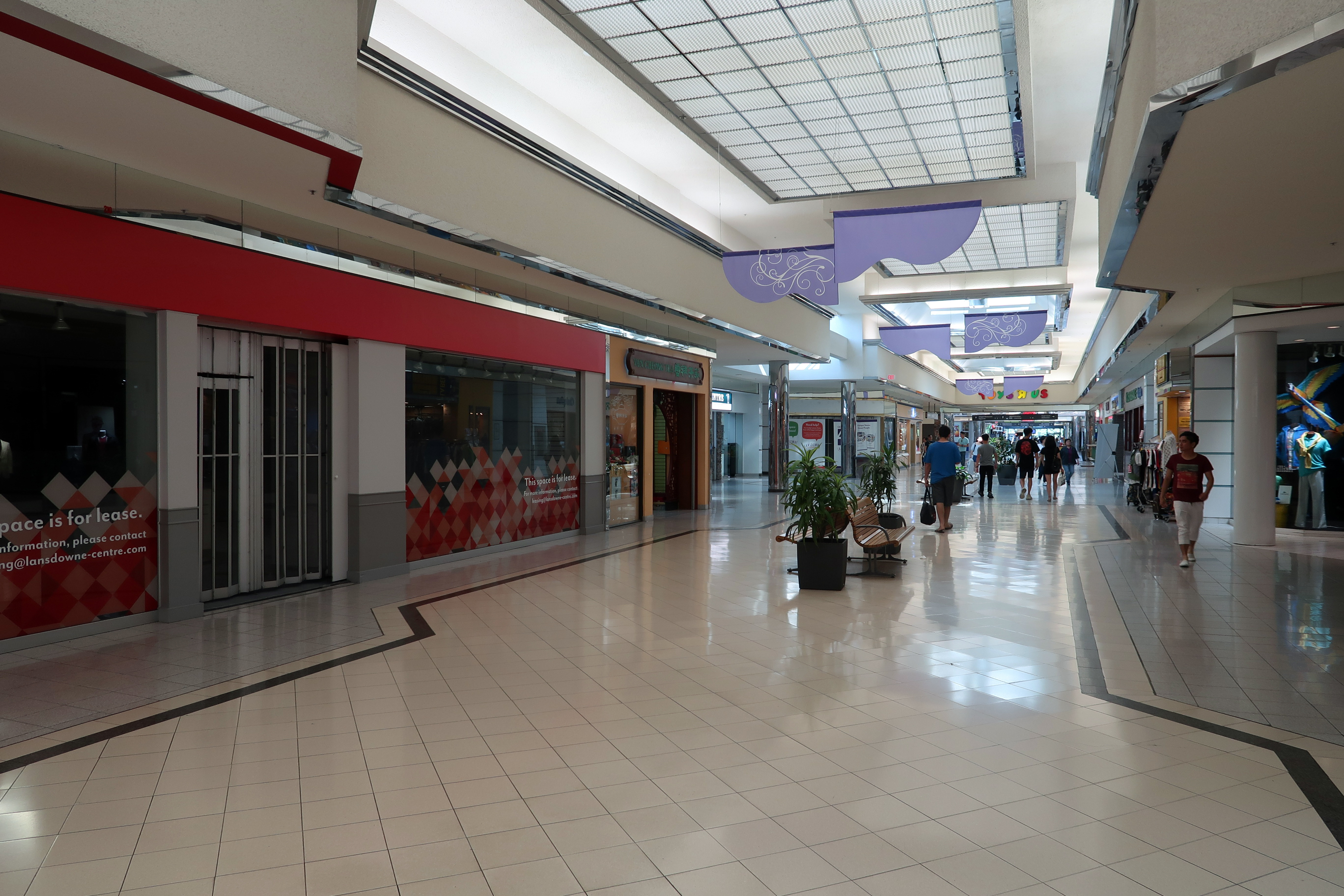
North mall
