= Marpole Loop =

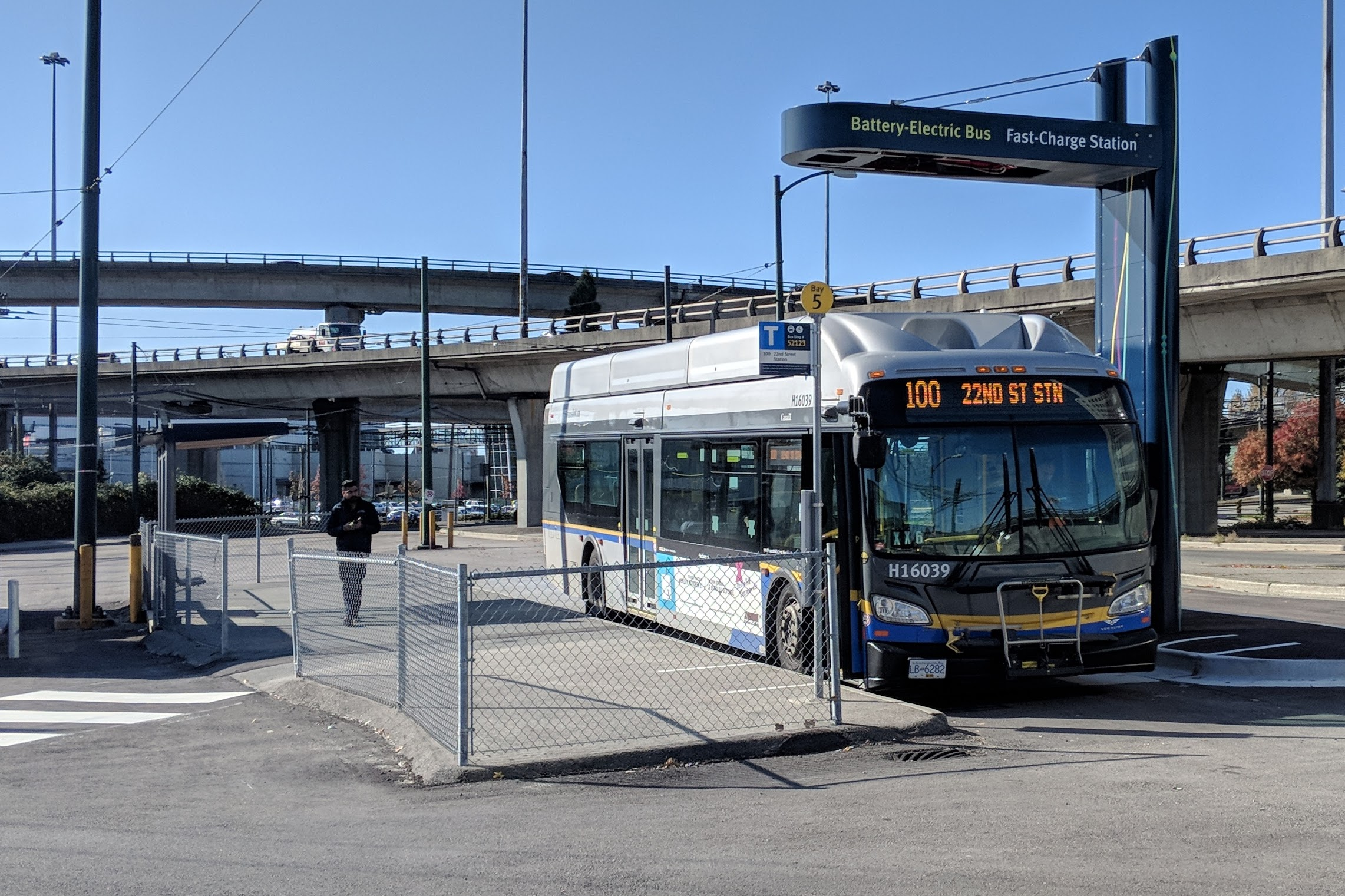
- Marpole Loop's main portion with charging station

General information
- Location: Hudson St at SW Marine Dr; Vancouver, British Columbia; Canada
- Coordinates: 49°12′10″N 123°8′3″W
- Owner: TransLink
- Operator: TransLink
- Bus routes: 2
- Bus stands: 5
- Bus operators: Coast Mountain Bus Company

Other information
- Fare zone: 1

History
- Opened: Canadian Pacific station in 1902; Marpole Loop in 1949
Location

Marpole Loop is a public transit exchange in the Marpole neighbourhood of Vancouver, British Columbia, Canada. This facility is part of Metro Vancouver's TransLink transit network. Located at the northern foot of the Arthur Laing Bridge, this is the southernmost exchange within the city of Vancouver.

== Passenger/freight station ==
The Canadian Pacific Railway (CP) built the Vancouver–Steveston line under the Vancouver & Lulu Island Railway (V&LI) charter. On the north side of the North Arm, the CP station, which opened in 1902, was called Eburne but was later renamed Marpole. In 1905, the British Columbia Electric Railway (BCER) leased and electrified the line. Similarly in 1909, CP built the Marpole–New Westminster line for lease under the V&LI charter. BCER passenger services began in July 1905 and November 1909 on the respective routes.

During World War II, workers transferred to buses at the station for travel to the Boeing plant on Sea Island. After the war, the Marpole–New Westminster route experienced weak passenger traffic.

The respective interurban passenger service closures were Vancouver–Marpole in June 1952, Marpole–New Westminster in November 1956, and Steveston–Marpole in February 1958. BC Hydro, the BCER successor, continued a scheduled freight service.

In 1962, a steam train excursion included Kitsilano, Marpole depot, and New Westminster.

When the lease expired in 1985, CP took over freight operations. CP freight service ended north of Marpole in 1999 and south across the Marpole Bridge in 2014.

== Earlier streetcar/bus terminus ==
The 17 Oak, the only streetcar route that ever reached the vicinity, commenced service in January 1913. The stop was adjacent to the station. That year, the four-storey Grand Central Hotel was built on the Hudson St corner, notable in the background to the interurban station and Oak streetcar.

By the late 1920s, this station was also known as the Marpole Depot. Bus service to connect with the Granville streetcar at West 41st Avenue was operating by 1930.

When eliminating this bus and the associated No. 8 streetcar services, the 1949 launching of the Granville trolleybus line also modified the southern extremity of the route.

In April 1952, the Oak streetcar service ended and was temporarily replaced by buses. That July, trolleybus service commenced.

== Bus loop ==
To serve the existing routes, the Marpole bus loop opened in July 1949 on the then–Marpole depot site and adjacent land. The Granville Street trolleybus service began at this time. The prior day, a stagecoach pioneer was the first passenger to ride that new transit mode.

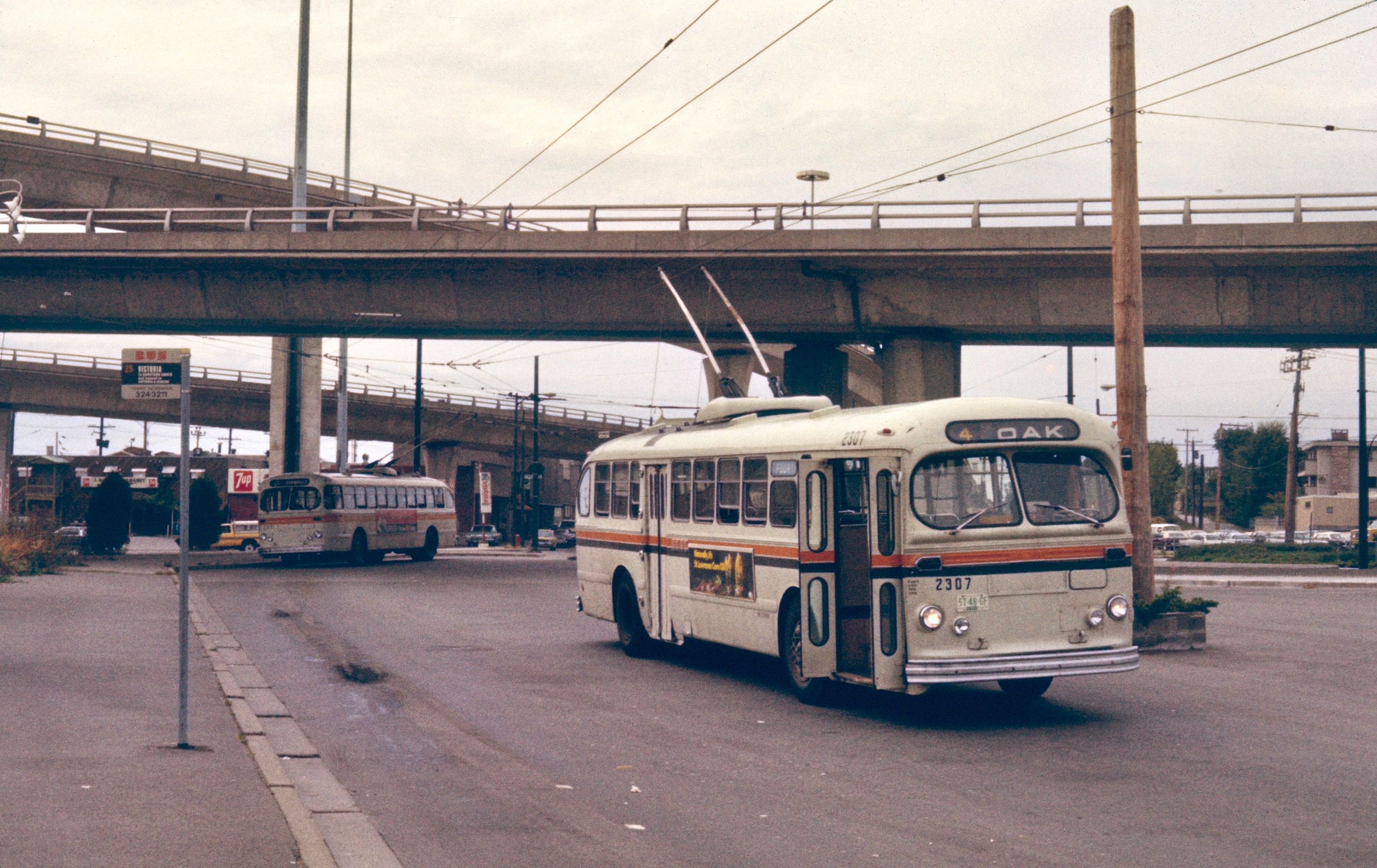
Two 1951 Canadian Car–Brill trolley buses at Marpole Loop in 1981

On horse race days, special bus services from the loop to Lansdowne Racetrack were running by 1951, which appears to be when special streetcars from downtown to the track ceased. Prior to late 1954, half the Granville trolleybuses terminated at the 63rd Avenue loop. After that date, all except some rush hour ones continued to the Marpole Loop.

To replace the Oakridge Transit Centre, the Vancouver Transit Centre was built on the former sawmill site to the southwest of the loop. Opened in September 2006, the centre includes accommodation for the Vancouver trolleybus fleet.

On the opening of the SkyTrain's Canada Line in September 2009, suburban routes that served Marpole Loop from Delta, Surrey, and White Rock were rerouted to terminate at Bridgeport station. On the same date, local trolleybus services were routed to serve Marine Drive station.

In April 2019, TransLink installed its first overhead battery-electric bus charger at the Marpole Loop. That September, four such buses began operating on route 100. During the earlier months of this pilot service, the buses were used for rush hour service only, before slowly transitioning into all-day service.

In March 2022, the pilot project conducted in association with the Canadian Urban Transit Research & Innovation Consortium (CUTRIC) was completed, and the battery-electric buses continued in regular service. That year, 15 new buses were ordered for route 100 with delivery spanning late into 2023.

== Loop and adjacent bus stops ==
Stops at Marpole Loop / Hudson and Marine
No.	Name	Start	End			Comments	References
W5	New Westminster	Pre-1949				Numbered as 98 Marine / 99 Second St. in 1965. Ultimately became part of route 800 Midway Connector. Renumbered and renamed route 100 Midway Connector in 1978. Renamed New Westminster / Airport in 1984, New Westminster Stn. / 22nd St Stn. / Marpole / Airport by 1999, 22nd St Stn. / Airport Stn. in 2001, and 22nd St Stn. / Marpole Loop in 2009.	
17	Oak	1952	2009		(Note: Rerouted 17 Oak to terminate at Marine Drive station)		
32	Granville	1949			(Note: Extended 10 Granville from Marpole Loop to Marine Drive station)	Renumbered route 20 by 1958 and route 10 Granville/Hastings in 2003. Renamed Granville/Downtown in 2011.	
58	49th Main–Marpole	Pre-1949	1953			Renumbered as route 33 by September 1952. Replaced by Main–Marpole shuttle until Fraser–Marpole.	
	Fraser–Marpole	1954	1961				
60	Richmond Express	1958	1977			Replaced by renumbered Richmond routes that continued to Vancouver	
71	Airport Rd.	1946	1957			Terminus ceased on Marpole Bridge closure.	
72	Grauer Rd	1946	1957			Terminus ceased on Marpole Bridge closure.	
73	No. 2 Rd–No. 5 Rd	Pre-1949	1957			Terminus ceased on Marpole Bridge closure.	
74	No. 3 Rd–No. 4 Rd	Pre-1949	1957			Terminus ceased on Marpole Bridge closure.	
310	Scottsdale Mall/Vancouver	1987	1990	(Note: Peak hours on weekdays only)			
311	Scottsdale/Vancouver	1987	2009		(Note: Rerouted to terminate at Bridgeport station)		
351	North Bluff	1977	2009			Renamed North Bluff / Vancouver in 1984 and Crescent Beach / Vancouver in 1987	
354	White Rock South/Vancouver	1985	2009				
480	Richmond/UBC	1979	2020			Cancelled in 1981. Relaunched as route 480 Steveston/UBC in 1990. Renamed Richmond/UBC in 2000 and UBC / Richmond-Brighouse Stn. in 2009. Never restored after 2020 suspension.	
490	Steveston/Vancouver	1986	2009			Renamed Steveston / Burrard Station in 2001	
601	South Delta	Pre-1982	2009			Renamed South Delta / South Delta Exchange / Vancouver in 1984	
602	Tsawwassen Heights	1975	2009			Renamed Tsawwassen Heights / Vancouver in 1984	
603	Tsawwassen Ring	1975	2009			Renamed Beach Grove / Vancouver in 1985	
604	English Bluff/Vancouver	1985	2009				
652	Crescent Rd	1976	2009			Renumbered as route 352 by 1979. Renamed White Rock Centre in 1987 and Ocean Park by 2008.	

== Present routes ==
As of October 2020, Marpole Loop was served by the following routes:

Bay	Route	Destination	Notes
1	—	—	Unloading only
2	10	Granville	To Marine Drive Station
3	—	—	Not in service due to indefinite suspension of route 480
4	10	Downtown	
4	100	Marpole Loop	
5	100	22nd Street Station	

== Loop future ==
The immediate area was the original neighbourhood centre for Marpole. The construction of the Oak Street Bridge, then the Arthur Laing Bridge, moved the shopping precinct from lower Hudson Street to lower Granville Street. Until the late 1950s, the site was a significant transit hub and retail centre. Since that time, its importance has dwindled, becoming largely irrelevant on the opening of Marine Drive station in 2009. The City of Vancouver has been working with TransLink to improve the Marpole Loop by creating a more user-friendly and vibrant area.
