= Richmond Centre (mall) =

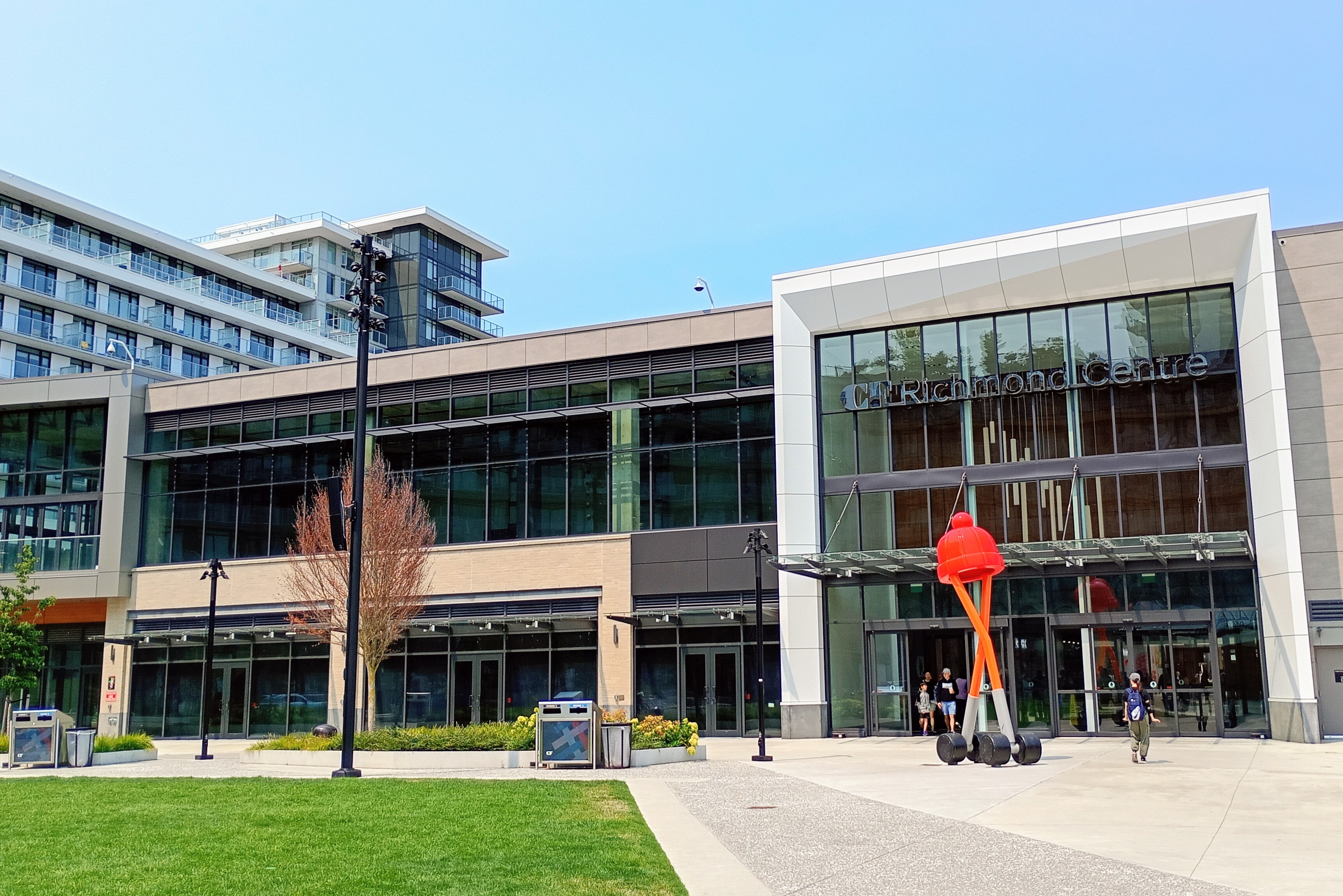
- Entrance to Richmond Centre at Park Plaza
- Location: Richmond, British Columbia, Canada
- Coordinates: 49.167086°N 123.138328°W
- Address: 6551 No. 3 Road
- Opened: 1968
- Manager: Cadillac Fairview
- Owner: Cadillac Fairview (50%); Ivanhoé Cambridge (50%)
- Num. of stores: 250
- Num. of anchor tenants: 1
- Floor area: 71,201.5 m^{2} (766,407 sq ft)
- Floors: 2
- Public transit: Richmond–Brighouse
- Website: shops.cadillacfairview.com/property/cf-richmond-centre

Richmond Centre (corporately styled as CF Richmond Centre and formerly known as Richmond Square) is a shopping mall in Richmond, British Columbia, Canada. Its street address is on No. 3 Rd, with other entrances on Minoru Blvd and Granville Ave. Richmond City Hall is immediately south of it.

== History ==
Richmond Centre Mall began as Richmond Square Shopping Centre, built in 1964 on part of the old Brighouse/Minoru Racetrack. Simpson Sears was located where the food court/glass atrium is today, Zellers was in the Sport Chek/Old Navy area, and SuperValu occupied the south end.

Two years later, Hudson's Bay Company announced plans for their store and mall to be built adjacent to Richmond Square. The two malls were separated by a small road (where upper parking meets the new food court today). They functioned as separate shopping centres until 1989 when they amalgamated into one large mall known today as Richmond Centre. Sears moved to the mall's south end, and a movie theatre, stores and a new food court moved into the space where the malls were joined and the old Simpson Sears was located.

In 2012, a $30M food court (The Dining Terrace) opened where the former Famous Players movie theatre was located. It features 18 different dining options. The old food court was replaced with some retail spaces. Another retailer, Express, opened on the bottom floor of the former movie theatre. After its closure in 2018, Japanese retailer Uniqlo opened in its former space.

In 2019, a redevelopment proposal was approved to create 12 new mid-rise buildings. The former Sears, south parkade, Sport Chek/Old Navy (former old Zellers wing) and adjacent parking will be demolished for the construction of these buildings.

The first phase of the redevelopment was finished in late 2025, providing the mall with 7 new residential towers on top of nearly 40,000 sq. ft. of additional street-facing retail space, 800 underground customer parking spots, and a new public plaza, Park Plaza. During the 2025 holiday season, the mall erected a 78ft tall Christmas tree at Park Plaza, the tallest in Metro Vancouver. Sport Chek and Old Navy have since reopened inside the mall.

== Layout ==
Richmond Centre, similar to its closest rival mall Lansdowne Centre, was mostly built on a single level owing to the abundance of unoccupied land in Richmond at the time of its construction. This means most of the shopping centre can be reached without the need of escalators or elevators. The only exception is the "Dining Terrace" food court, alongside Sport Chek. Furthermore, the now defunct Hudson's Bay had a second level.

The mall is laid out in a large rectangle. A galleria runs down the middle of the mall, splitting it into two parts. The north end was previously anchored by Hudson's Bay, while the south end is anchored by sports retailer Sport Chek.

Sears held the south end anchor but went out of business on February 28, 2015. The former Sears space, spanning 10,000 square metres (110,000 sq ft) over two floors, was demolished in 2021 for the redevelopment of that area of the mall.

== Stores ==
Richmond Centre is managed by Cadillac Fairview. The shopping mall has 165 retail stores with its former main retail anchor, Hudson's Bay, now closed and vacant. Other retailers include H&M, Sport Chek, Zara, Aritzia, Sephora, Uniqlo, Lego, Lululemon, Apple, Cactus Club Cafe, Muji, and Nike.

== Transportation ==
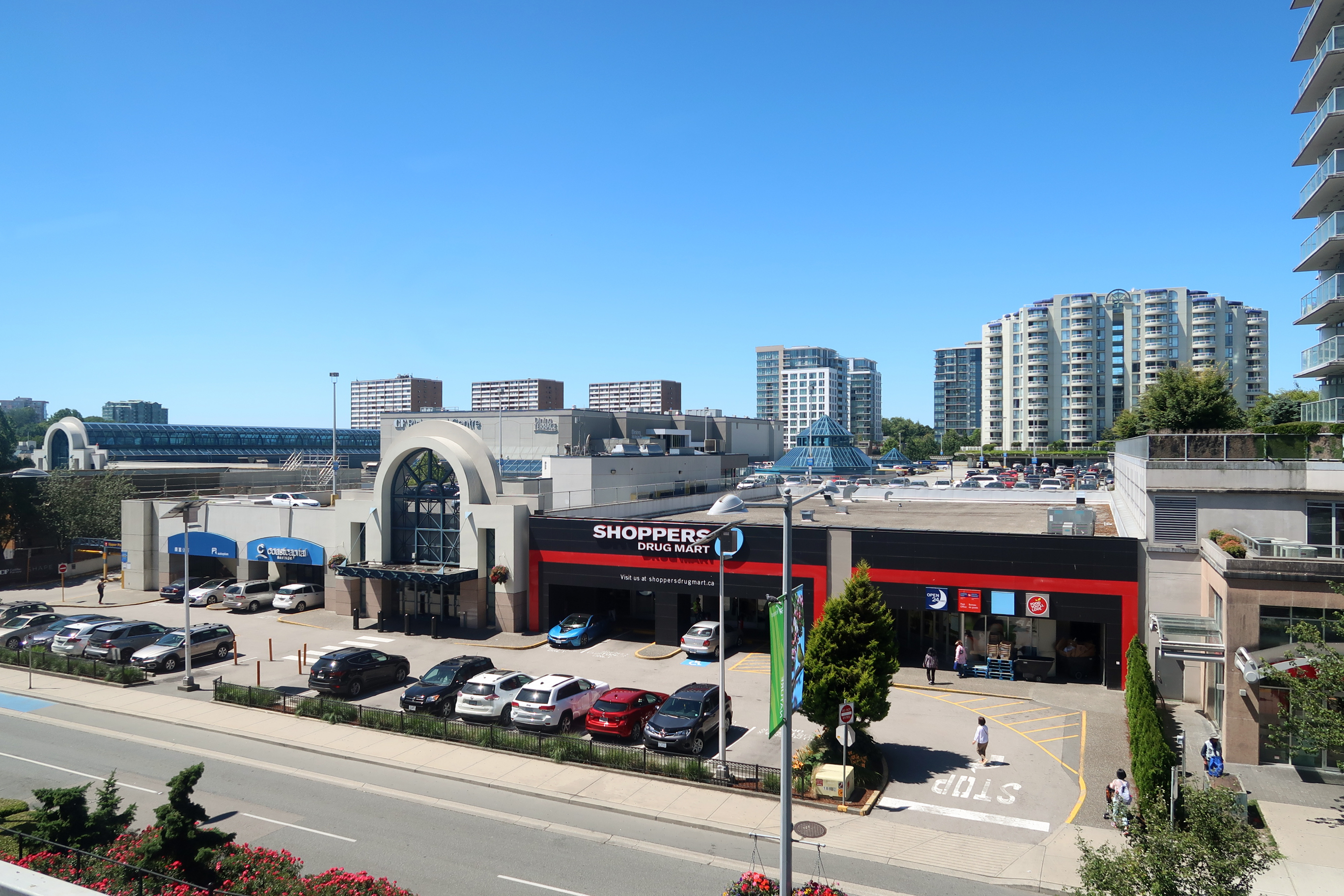
Richmond Centre as seen from the SkyTrain platform

Richmond Centre is the main transit hub for Richmond and is served by the SkyTrain system. The closest station is the Canada Line's southern terminus, Richmond–Brighouse station. The station is directly across the street from the mall's Shoppers Drug Mart / Coast Capital Savings entrance.

The mall is also served by frequent bus service along No. 3 Road. The adjacent bus exchange provides connections to other parts of Richmond as well as service to Burnaby, New Westminster, and Surrey.

== Gallery ==
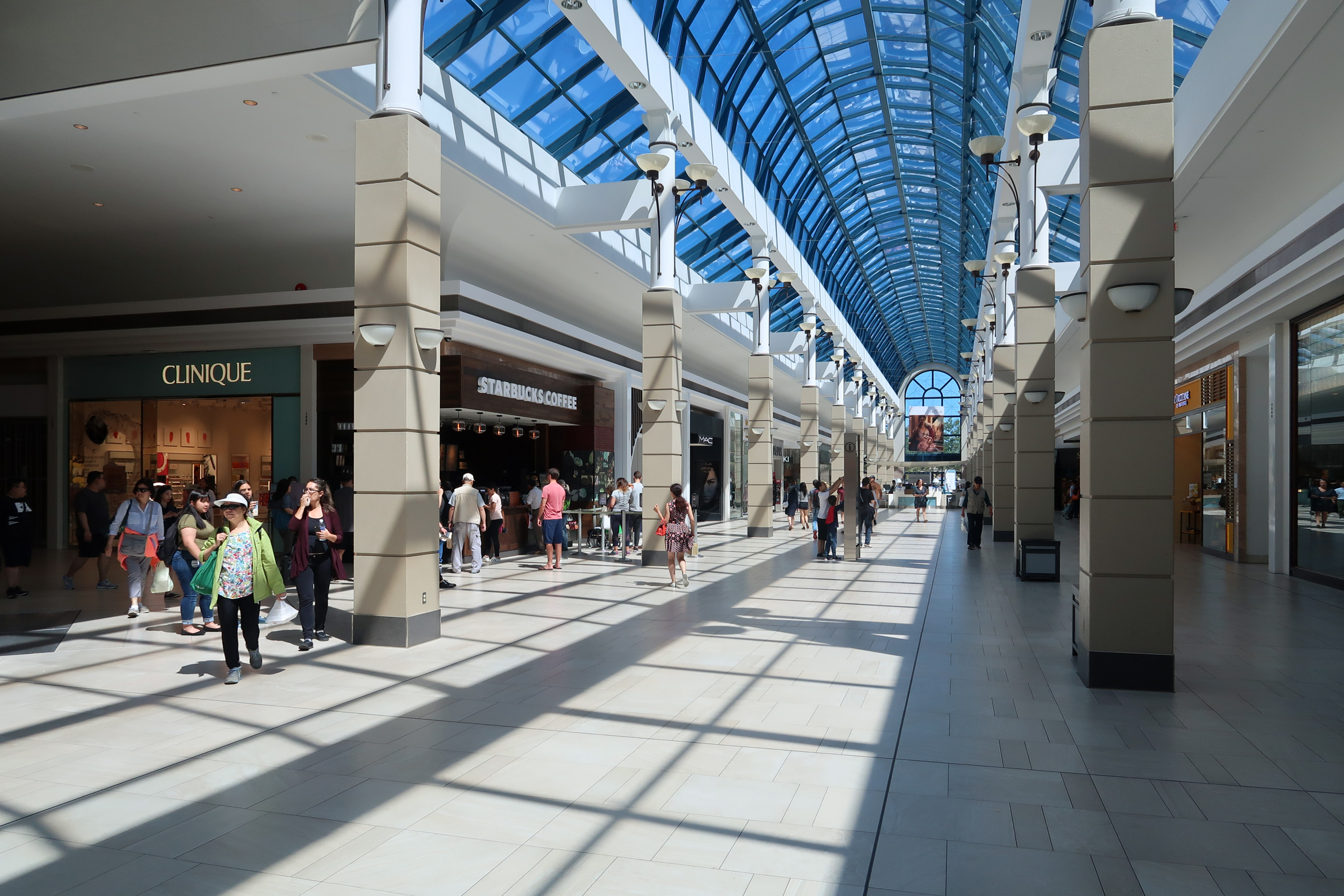
Main Galleria

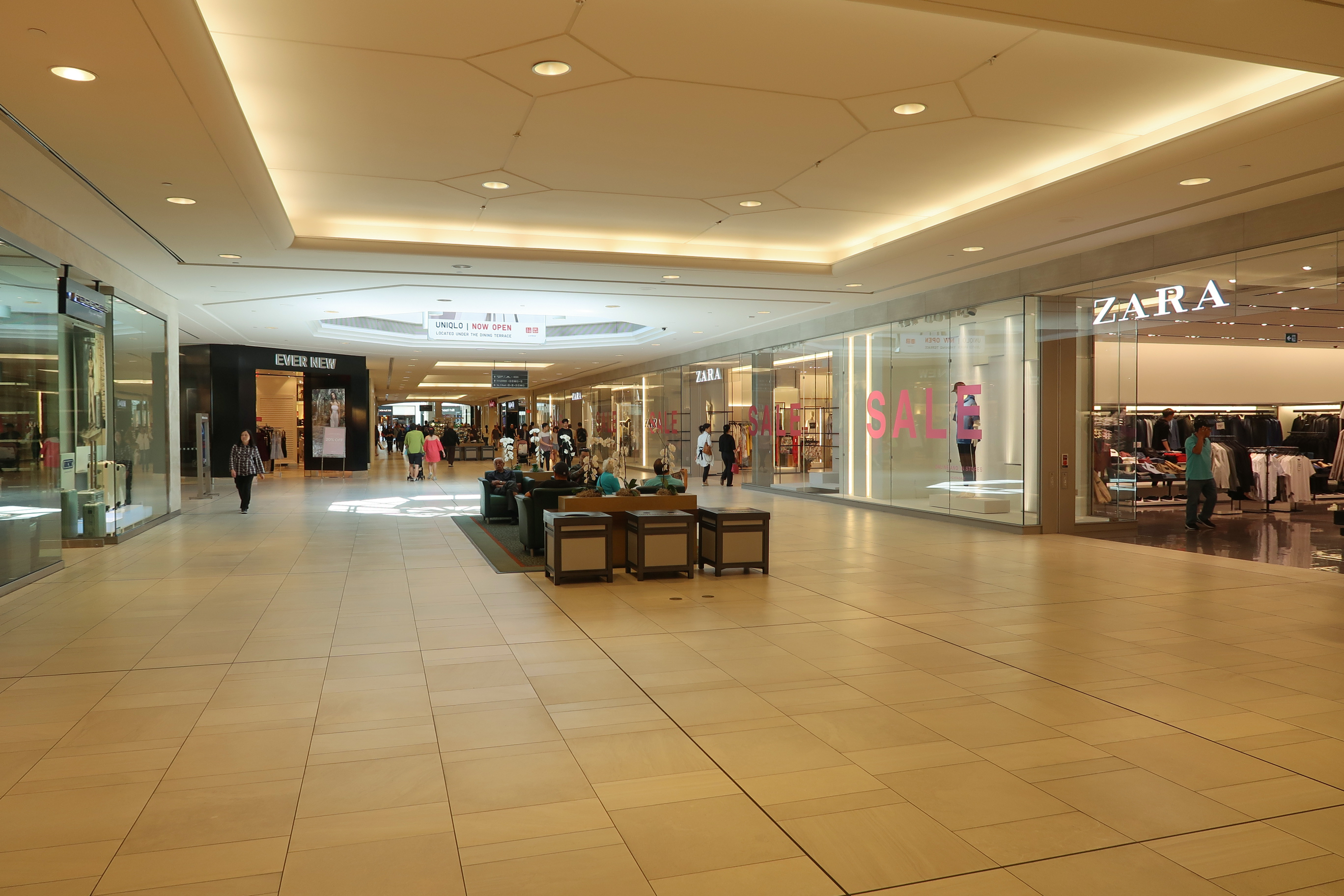
Level 1 Shops

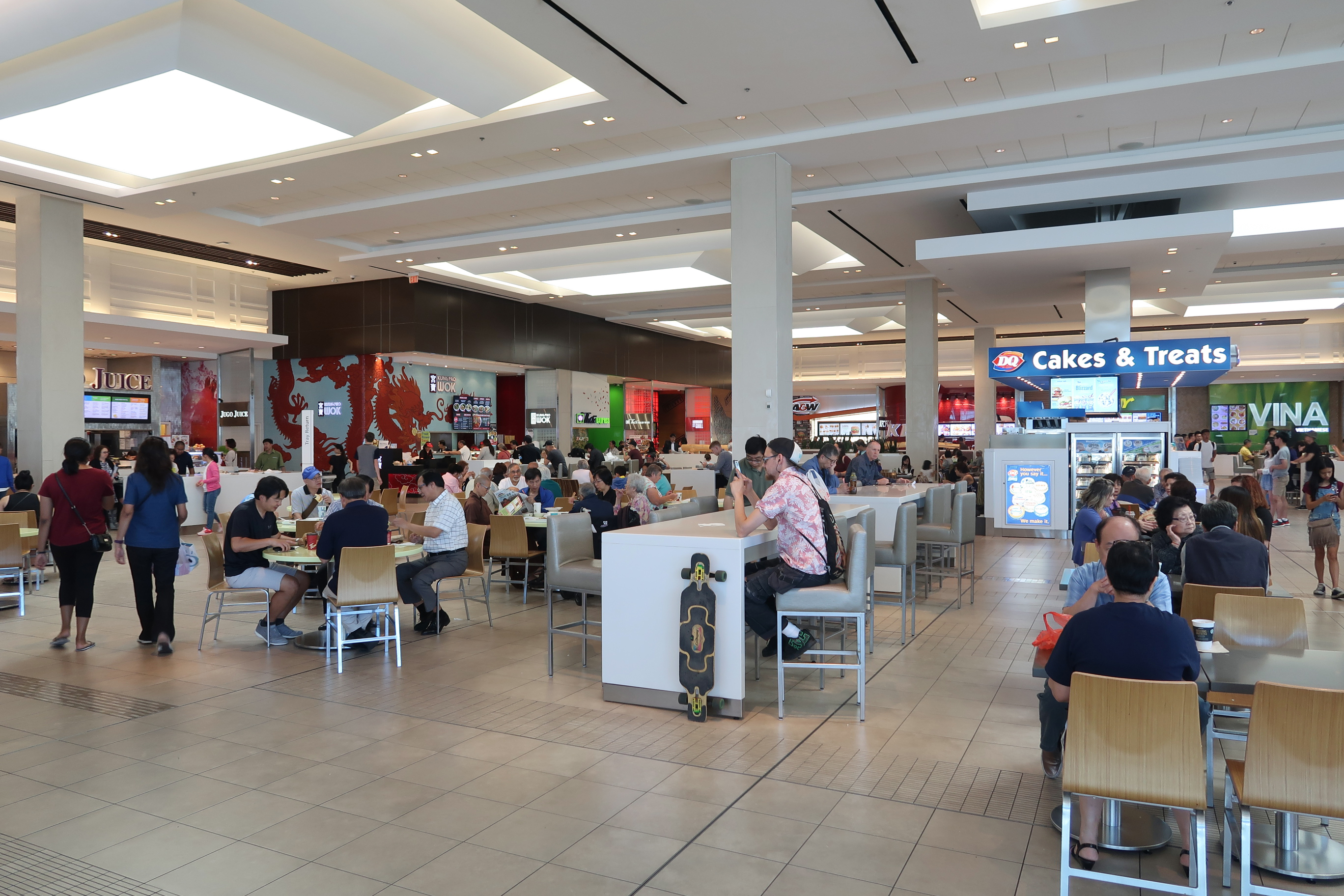
Level 2 Dining Terrace food court

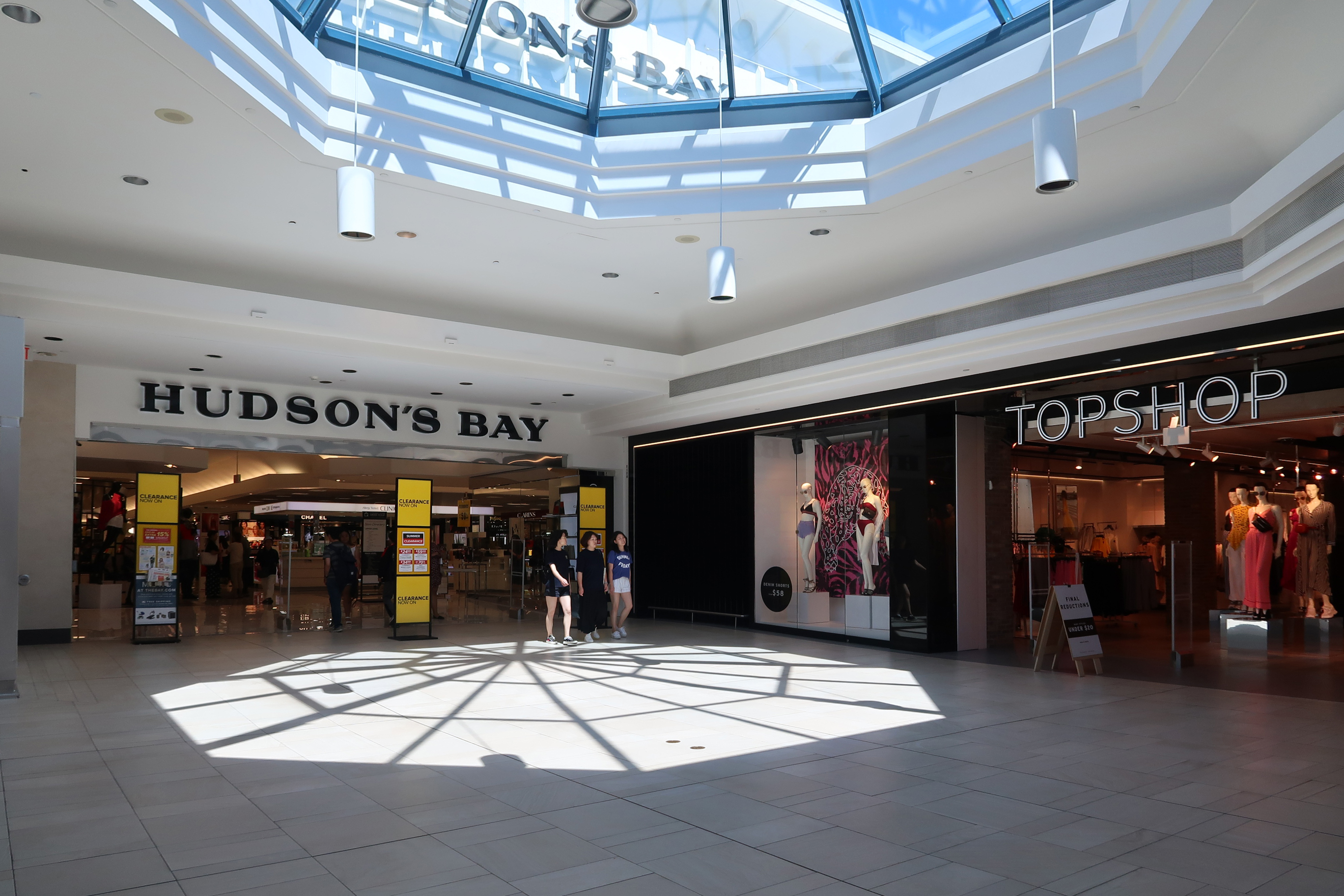
Former Hudson's Bay

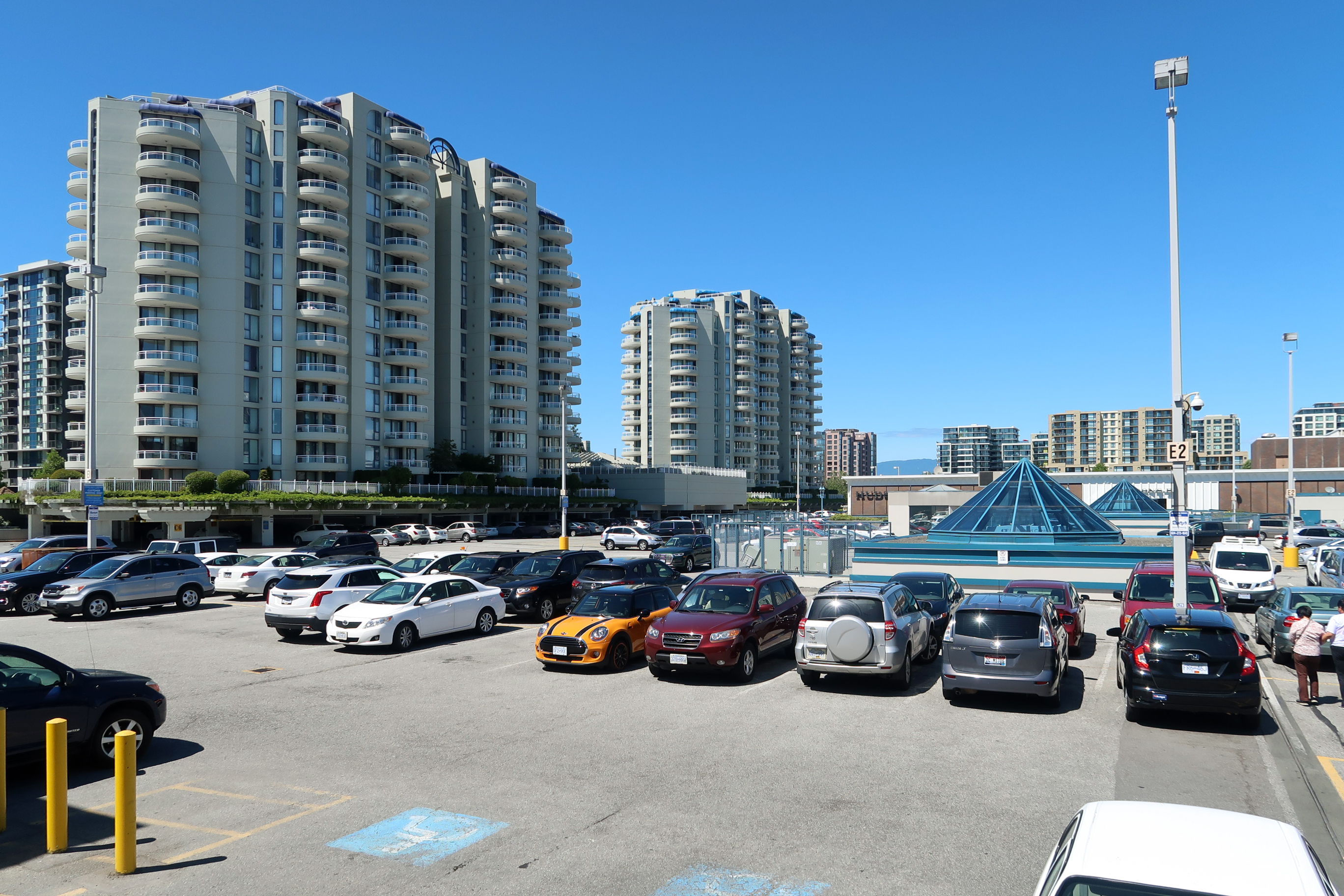
Level 2 Carpark
