= Edward III (disambiguation) =

Edward III (1312–1377; r. 1327–1377) was King of England.

Edward III may also refer to:

- Edward III, Duke of Bar (1377–1415)
- Edward III (play), possibly by William Shakespeare, 1596
- Edward III (1690 play), by John Bancroft and William Mountfort

== See also ==
- Edward the Confessor (1003/1005 – 1066; r. 1042–1066), the third King Edward of Anglo-Saxon England
- Edward of England (disambiguation)
- Edward Windsor (disambiguation)
- King Edward (disambiguation)
