= Eric Hamber Secondary School =

Coordinates: 49.240°N 123.125°W

- The exterior of the school

Location
- 960 West 33rd Avenue; Vancouver, British Columbia, V5Z 0L2; Canada

Information
- Other names: Hamber, EHSS
- School type: Secondary school
- Motto: Respice, Aspice, Prospice (Reflect on the Past, Consider the Present, Provide for the Future)
- Established: 1962
- Status: In operation
- School board: School District 39 Vancouver
- School district: 39
- Superintendent: Helen McGregor
- Area trustee: Victoria Jung
- School number: 03939022
- Principal: J. Lauzon
- Vice principals: N. Gates; N. Despotakis; T. Myring
- Grades: 8–12
- Enrollment: 1,697 (2025/2026)
- Language: English
- Schedule: 8:40-15:05
- Hours in school day: 6:25 hrs
- Area: South Cambie
- Colours: Maroon & light blue
- Mascot: Griffin
- Team name: Eric Hamber Griffins
- Newspaper: The Griffins' Nest
- Yearbook: The Griffin
- Feeder schools: Carr, Cavell, Fraser, Jamieson, Osler, Van Horne, Wolfe
- Public transit access: 15, 17, 25, 33, 41, R4, Oakridge-41st Avenue Station, King Edward Station
- Website: www.vsb.bc.ca/schools/eric-hamber/Pages/default.aspx

Eric Hamber Secondary School is a public secondary school located in the South Cambie neighbourhood of Vancouver, British Columbia, Canada. Eric Hamber is a comprehensive secondary school with approximately 1700 students. Each year, approximately 70% of the senior class graduate with honours standing. The school is named after Eric Hamber, former lieutenant governor of British Columbia. The school colours, maroon and light blue, were the colours used by Eric Hamber's race horses. The school's mascot is a Griffin.

== Feeder schools ==
The elementary schools in Eric Hamber's catchment area include:

- Dr. Annie B. Jamieson Elementary School
- Edith Cavell Elementary School
- Emily Carr Elementary School
- General Wolfe Elementary School
- L'École Bilingue Elementary School
- Simon Fraser Elementary School
- Sir William Osler Elementary School
- Sir William Van Horne Elementary School

== Programs ==
=== Challenged Students Program ===
The Challenge Studio Program presents qualifying students with an academically challenging accelerated Grade 8 to 12 program that encompasses both acceleration and enrichment. Students in the program complete three years of study in Grades 8 and 9. Students in grades 10 to 12 study in enriched and Advanced Placement courses as well as through guided independent or concurrent post-secondary studies.

=== Mandarin Bilingual program ===
Eric Hamber offers a Mandarin Accelerated program for Grade 8 and 9 students who have completed the Mandarin Bilingual program at Jamieson Elementary School. The Mandarin Bilingual program started the four-year transition to move from Jamieson Elementary to Pierre Elliott Trudeau Elementary School in the 2020/2021 school year.

=== Fashion design and technology ===
Eric Hamber offers a fashion design program that teaches students about sewing techniques, textile manipulation, merchandising, and desktop publishing. The program was started in 1992 by Nina Ho. Students have competed locally, provincially, and at the Skills Canada National Competition. A show is presented every year to showcase the students' work.

=== Theatre Hamber ===
The Eric Hamber Theatre department runs four mainstage and four junior theatre productions (the "Footlights") each school year. The mainstage productions usually include a guest-directed play, musical and student-written play.

== Eric Hamber's Run for the Sun ==
On May 27, 2011, Eric Hamber held an event called "Run for the Sun" to raise money to install four solar panels on the school's roof. The solar panels are being used to heat the water in the school year round. A total of 653 students from 26 classes participated in the event by running or walking for five kilometres. The event raised a total of $8,495, and acceptance of a Vancouver Foundation Generation Green award of $12,500 raised a total of $21,000.

== Media ==
The Griffins' Nest is Hamber's student-led, independent newspaper, and was founded in 2012. The paper transformed over the course of the 2020/2021 school year and drew praise from several external organizations, including the Canadian Association of Journalists, Student Press Law Center, Canadian Youth Journalism Project, J-Source, British Columbia Civil Liberties Association, Canadian University Press, and Ryerson University Centre for Free Expression.

The newspaper has a history of public-interest reporting, and its student journalists have refused censorship on numerous occasions. A May 2021 censorship dispute between school administration/the school board and the Nest led editors to draft the Student Press Freedom Act, Canada's first student journalism protection legislation.

== Accomplishments ==
In recent years, Eric Hamber's Physics Olympics team has excelled, often placing among the top ten. In a pool of 80 teams across the province, Hamber placed 6th and 8th place overall in 2021, 5th and 6th place in 2022, and winning the overall competition with 1st and 9th among all teams in 2023. During this time, Hamber's Physics Olympics club grew from 15 members to over 50 members by 2024. In 2024, Hamber's teams placed 2nd and 12th, but notably placed 1st and 2nd in the solar car prebuild competition, where they built solar-powered cars that traveled 8 and 4 metres respectively. This accomplishment was especially remarkable, as fewer than 10 teams had managed to get their cars to move several centimeters, with most cars failing to move at all. In 2025, Eric Hamber placed 1st and 17th among 81 high schools, placing first in both the Fermi competition and winning the overall competition for the second time. In 2026, Eric Hamber team 1 placed 4th among 80 high schools, placing second in Fermi, seventh on lab, sixth on Quizzics.

Hamber's CanSat team received first place in the 2024 Canadian CanSat Competition. Their team went on to represent Canada at ESTEC for a European Space Agency conference.

Their Reach For The Top senior trivia team has placed first in the province in the years 2020–2023. They placed second in the national finals in 2016.

In 2022, Hamber won the grade 10 provincial championship in the Math Challengers competition. In 2021, Eric Hamber's grade 9 team came in second place in the same competition.

== Football ==
In 2010, under the direction of PE teacher Bobby Gibson, Eric Hamber became the only public school in Vancouver to have an American football program. In the 2010 season, the Eric Hamber Griffins competed in the Junior Varsity AA league only. In the 2011 season, the Griffins competed with teams in both the Junior Varsity AA and Varsity Tier II leagues. In 2012, both the junior varsity and varsity teams competed in the AA league. That year, the junior varsity team made the playoffs, becoming the first Griffins football team to do so, losing in the first round. In 2013, the junior varsity team competed in an amalgamated AA/AAA league, while the varsity team was relegated at the school's request to the Tier II development league. The junior varsity team failed to make the playoffs, while the varsity team was defeated in the first round of the Tier II championship.

Beginning in 2014, Eric Hamber stopped fielding both a junior varsity and varsity team, opting to join the teams and compete with a roster consisting of Grade 9 to 12 players in the Tier II development League. In the 2014 season, the Griffins made it to the final of the Tier II Provincial Championship, losing 7–6 to Earl Marriott Secondary School. In 2015, the Griffins continued to field only one team, with that team losing in the semi-finals of the provincial tournament. In the 2017 season, the Griffins won the Tier II provincial championship, defeating the Spectrum Thunder, making Eric Hamber the first Vancouver public high school in 25 years to win a senior varsity football title.

Starting in 2012, Eric Hamber began a Grade 8 football program in the spring. The team does not play in the formal Grade 8 fall league, but organizes exhibition games with other schools during the spring sports season. The program also organizes a flag football program in the spring for feeder elementary schools to promote a culture of football amongst students who are likely to eventually attend to Eric Hamber.

Eric Hamber Griffins Football runs with relative independence from the athletics department of the school, due to its unique province-wide league and player-based funding. Player fees range from $250 to $300, based on the season, and funding is available for those who cannot afford the costs.

== Seismic upgrade and relocation ==
The Eric Hamber Seismic Replacement Project consisted of an entirely new building. The replacement school was planned to be approximately 15,600 meters. The $80 million school replacement was the largest seismic project in Vancouver history, with construction starting in late 2020. The school ended up receiving more than $105.7 million, with $94 million from the province, $3.5 million from the Vancouver School Board towards a new auditorium and $8.2 million from the City of Vancouver for a child care centre.

The replacement building was opened to students in September 2024, at the start of the 2024–2025 school year. As a result, the address of the school changed from 5025 Willow Street to 960 West 33rd Avenue. The new postal code is V5Z 0L2.

The former building was retained as temporary space for students whose schools are undergoing renovations.

== In media ==
One of the parking lots at Eric Hamber was extensively used in the early days of the television series 21 Jump Street, including a confrontation involving Johnny Depp. It was later used as the high school in the 2007 film Juno. Eric Hamber was used for the filming of TV series iZombie in November 2015. In late 2020, the school was used for the filming of the Netflix TV series Riverdale. The former school was also used as the high school in Carrie in 2026.

=== Canada Sings ===
In 2011, several of Eric Hamber's staff were part of a glee club called "The Edutones" on the show Canada Sings. They defeated the opposing Distillery Restaurants Corporation's "Run DRC" glee club and won $10,000 for the BC Children's Hospital Foundation. They appeared on episode 6 of season 1, which aired on September 8, 2011.

== Notable alumni ==
- Michael Benyaer (Class of 1988), actor, cartoon and video game voice actor
- Fred Cheng (Class of 2001), Hong Kong television actor and singer, winner of The Voice of Stars
- Katie Findlay (Class of 2008), actress, star of The Carrie Diaries
- C. E. Gatchalian (Class of 1992), award-winning playwright, poet and fictionist
- Gregory Henriquez (1977–1980), architect and 2004 Governor General's Medal in Architecture
- Aisha Sasha John (Class of 1998), dancer and poet
- Ori Kowarsky (Class of 1988), screenwriter and director of Various Positions, winner of the 2002 Prix de Montréal
- Kristin Kreuk (Class of 2000), actress, star of Television show Smallville
- Jenny Kwan (Class of 1984), member of Legislative Assembly of British Columbia
- Jen Sookfong Lee (Class of 1994), author of The Better Mother
- Patty Loverock (Class of 1971), sprinter, set the Canadian record for 100 meters in 1975, competed in 1976 Summer Olympics
- Scott McNeil (Class of 1980), voice actor
- Mayko Nguyen (Class of 1998), actress, star of film Going the Distance and television series Rent-A-Goalie
- Darryl O'Young (Class of 1998), Hong Kong race car driver
- Jon Mikl Thor (Class of 1971), heavy metal musician, bodybuilder and former Mr. Canada and Mr. USA
- Jessica Trisko (Class of 2001), crowned Miss Earth 2007
- Steve Wilson (Class of 1982), former pitcher for the Los Angeles Dodgers
- Jacqueline Wong Sum-wing (Class of 2007), first runner-up for Miss Hong Kong 2012
- Benny Yau (Class of 1998), singer and television personality

== Notable faculty ==
- Tom Thomson, CFL football player
