= Edward of England =

Edward of England may refer to:

== Monarchs ==
- Edward the Elder (870s? – 924; r. 899–924), King of the Anglo-Saxons
- Edward the Martyr (c. 962 – 978; r. 975–978), King of the English
- Edward the Confessor (c. 1003 – 1066; r. 1042–1066), King of the English
- Edward I of England (1239–1307; r. 1272–1307), King of England
- Edward II (1284–1327; r. 1307–1327), King of England
- Edward III of England (1312–1377; r. 1327–1377), King of England
- Edward IV (1442–1483; r. 1461–1470, 1471–1483), King of England
- Edward V (1470 – c. mid-1483; r. 1483), King of England
- Edward VI (1537–1553; r. 1547–1553), King of England
- Edward VII (1841–1910; r. 1901–1910), King of the United Kingdom
- Edward VIII (1894–1972; r. 1936), King of the United Kingdom

== Other people ==
- Edward the Exile (1016–1057), son of Edmund Ironside
- Edward the Black Prince (1330–1376), eldest son of Edward III
- Edward of Westminster, Prince of Wales (1453–1471), only child of Henry VI
- Edward of Middleham, Prince of Wales (c. 1473 or 1476 – 1484), only legitimate child of Richard III
- Prince Edward, Duke of York and Albany (1739–1767), grandson of George II and brother of George III
- Prince Edward, Duke of Kent and Strathearn (1767–1820), fourth son of George III and father of Queen Victoria
- Prince Edward, Duke of Kent (born 1935), grandson of George V
- Prince Edward, Duke of Edinburgh (born 1964), youngest child of Elizabeth II

== See also ==
- Edward, Prince of Wales (disambiguation)
- Edward Windsor (disambiguation)
- King Edward (disambiguation)
- Prince Edward (disambiguation)
- Edward I (disambiguation)
- Edward II (disambiguation)
- Edward III (disambiguation)
- Edward VII (disambiguation)
