= Edward, Prince of Wales =

Edward, Prince of Wales may refer to:

- Edward II (1284–1327; r. 1307–1327), Prince of Wales from 1301 to 1307 as heir of Edward I
- Edward the Black Prince (1330–1376), Prince of Wales from 1343 to 1376 as heir of Edward III
- Edward of Westminster (1453–1471), Prince of Wales from 1454 to 1471 as heir of Henry VI
- Edward V (1470 – c. mid-1483; r. 1483), Prince of Wales from 1471 to 1483 as heir of Edward IV
- Edward of Middleham (c. 1473 or 1476 – 1484), Prince of Wales from 1483 to 1484 as heir of Richard III
- Edward VI (1537–1553; r. 1547–1553), Prince of Wales from 1537 to 1547 as heir of Henry VIII
- Edward VII (1841–1910; r. 1901–1910), Prince of Wales from 1841 to 1901 as heir of Queen Victoria
- Edward VIII (1894–1972; r. 1936), Prince of Wales from 1910 to 1936 as heir of George V

== See also ==
- Edward of England (disambiguation)
- Edward Windsor (disambiguation)
- Prince Edward (disambiguation)
