= Albert Edward =

Albert Edward may refer to:

== People ==
- Edward VII (1841–1910; r. 1901–1910), King of the United Kingdom and formerly Albert Edward, Prince of Wales
- Albert Edward (soccer) (born 1991), Australian footballer
- Albert Edward Anson (1879–1936), British actor
- Albert Edward Caswell (1884–1954), American professor
- Albert Edward Cloutier (1902–1965), Canadian painter
- Albert Edward Litherland (born 1928), British nuclear physicist
- Albert Edward Martin (1876–1936), British politician
- Albert Edward McKenzie (1898–1918), British able seaman
- Albert Edward McPhillips (1861–1938), Canadian politician
- Albert Edward Smith (1871–1947), Canadian politician
- Albert Edward Winship (1845–1933), American educator

== Places ==
- Albert Edward Bay, Nunavut, Canada
- Albert Edward Bridge, a railway bridge in Shropshire, England, United Kingdom
- Mount Albert Edward (disambiguation), various mountains

== Other uses ==
- Albert Edward, a GWR 3031 Class locomotive built in 1897

== See also ==
- Albert (disambiguation)
- Edward (disambiguation)
- Albert Edward Smith (disambiguation)
- Edward VII (disambiguation)
