= Edward II (disambiguation) =

Edward II (1284–1327; r. 1307–1327) was King of England.

Edward II may also refer to:

- Edward II, Count of Bar (c. 1340 – 1352)
- Edward II (play), by Christopher Marlowe, 1592
  - Edward II (film), an adaptation by Derek Jarman, 1991
  - Edward II (ballet), an adaptation by Stuttgart Ballet, 1995
- Edward II (band), an English band formed in 1980
- Edward II, an opera by Andrea Lorenzo Scartazzini, 2017

== See also ==
- Edward the Martyr (c. 962 – 978; r. 975–978), the second King Edward of Anglo-Saxon England
- The Life of Edward II of England, by Bertolt Brecht, 1924
- GWR 6000 Class 6023 King Edward II, a preserved steam locomotive, 1930
- Edward of England (disambiguation)
- King Edward (disambiguation)
