= Mont Albert =

Mont Albert may refer to:

- Mont Albert, Quebec, a mountain in the Gaspé Peninsula, and one of the highest mountains in southern Quebec, Canada
- Mont Albert, Victoria, a suburb of Melbourne, Victoria, Australia

== See also ==
- Mount Albert (disambiguation)
