= Edward I (disambiguation) =

Edward I (1239–1307; r. 1272–1307) was King of England.

Edward I may also refer to:

- Edward I, Count of Bar (1294–1336)
- Edward I of Portugal (1391–1438; r. 1433–1438), King of Portugal
- Edward I (Moskito) (c. 1721 – 1755; r. 1729–1755), King of Mosquitia

== See also ==
- Edward the Elder (870s? – 924; r. 899–924), the first King Edward of Anglo-Saxon England
- Edward Bruce (c. 1280 – 1318; r. 1315–1318), High King of Ireland
- Edward Balliol (c. 1283 – 1364), Scottish anti-king
- Edward of England (disambiguation)
- King Edward (disambiguation)
