= Mount Albert Edward =

Mount Albert Edward may refer to:

- Mount Albert Edward (British Columbia), Canada
- Mount Albert Edward (Papua New Guinea)

== See also ==
- Albert Edward (disambiguation)
- Mount Albert (disambiguation)
- Mount Edward, Antarctica
