= Edward VII (disambiguation) =

Edward VII (1841–1910; r. 1901–1910) was King of the United Kingdom.

Edward VII or 7 may also refer to:

- Edward the Seventh, a British television series
- HMS King Edward VII, a British battleship
- King Edward VII Land, Antarctica
- King Edward VII School, Sheffield, South Yorkshire, England, United Kingdom

== See also ==
- Albert Edward (disambiguation)
- Edward VII Park, a park in Lisbon, Portugal
- Edward of England (disambiguation)
- King Edward (disambiguation)
- King Edward VII Hospital (disambiguation), various hospitals
