= Edward King =

Edward King may refer to:

== Politicians ==
- Edward J. King (1925–2006), Governor of Massachusetts, 1979–1983 (Also sportsman)
- Edward King, 1st Earl of Kingston (1726–1797), Anglo-Irish politician and peer
- Edward King (Irish politician), MP for Carrick, 1781–1793
- Edward King (Ohio politician) (1795–1836), twice Speaker of the Ohio House and co-founder and on first faculty of Cincinnati Law School
- Edward Bolton King (1800–1878), British Liberal Party politician, MP for Warwick 1830–1837, South Warwickshire 1857–59
- Edward John King (1867–1929), U.S. Representative from Illinois
- Edward King (Parliamentarian) (1606–1681), English lawyer and politician
- Ed King (mayor), mayor of Mount Pleasant, Iowa, who was assassinated during a 1986 city council meeting
- Edward King-Harman (1838–1888), Irish landlord and politician

== Sportsmen ==
- Ed King (American football) (born 1969), former football player
- Eddie King (British runner) (born 1976), British runner and finalist at the 1999 IAAF World Indoor Championships – Men's 1500 metres
- Eddie King (Canadian runner) (1911–1994), Canadian Olympic athlete
- Eddie King (coach), (1912–1963), American football and basketball coach, college athletics administrator, and educator
- Eddie King (footballer, born 1886) (1886–?), English football right half
- Eddie King (footballer, born 1914) (1914–1993), English-born football defender who played for Tottenham Hotspur
- Eddie King (ice hockey) (1885–1970), Canadian ice hockey player
- Eddie King (jockey), horse racing jockey who won the 2005 Rumson Stakes
- Edward King (rower) (born 1989), American rower
- Edward J. King (1925–2006), American football end for the Buffalo Bills and Baltimore Colts (also politician)
- Ted King (cyclist) (born 1983), American cyclist

== Musicians ==
- Ed King (1949–2018), American musician; member of Lynyrd Skynyrd
- Edward T. King, early 20th-century musician and Zon-o-phone, Victor and Columbia executive
- Eddie King (musician) (1938–2012), American blues guitarist

== Writers ==
- Edward King (British poet) (1612–1637)
- Edward King (antiquarian) (1735?–1807), English barrister and writer
- Edward King (author) (1848–1896), American journalist and author

== Military figures ==
- Edward King (Royal Navy officer) (1774–1807), captain during the Napoleonic Wars
- Edward Leonard King (1873–1933), American football player and coach; general in U.S. Army
- Edward P. King (1884–1958), American major general who led US forces on Bataan during World War II
- Edward Durnford King (1771–1862), Royal Navy officer

== Religious figures ==
- Edward King (bishop of Elphin) (died 1639), Anglican bishop in Ireland
- Edward King (bishop of Lincoln) (1829–1910), Anglican bishop in England
- Edward King (priest) (1920–1998), Anglican clergyman

== Others ==
- Edward King (jurist) (1794–1873), jurist twice nominated to the United States Supreme Court
- Edward King, Viscount Kingsborough (1795–1837), Irish antiquarian
- Edward King (New York banker) (1833–1908), American banker
- Edward King Redmore (1860–1941), English painter
- Edward Skinner King (1861–1931), American astronomer
- Edward King (painter) (1863–1951), English painter

== See also ==
- Ed King (activist) (1936–2026), American minister and activist
- King Edward (disambiguation)
