= Let's Talk Science =

- Let's Talk Science | Parlons sciences bilingual logo
- Formation: 1993; 33 years ago
- Type: Charitable organization
- Registration no.: 885400846 RR0001
- Purpose: Education
- Headquarters: London, Ontario, Canada
- Region served: Canada
- Official language: English, French
- President & Founder: Bonnie Schmidt, C.M. PhD
- Website: www.letstalkscience.ca

Let’s Talk Science (French: Parlons sciences) is a registered Canadian charitable organization focused on education and skills development for children and youth in Canada through science, technology, engineering and math (STEM) based programs. Founded in London, Ontario in 1993, the head office remains in London, ON, with a regional office in St. John’s, NL and remote staff across the country. Dr. Bonnie Schmidt is the president and founder of Let's Talk Science.

== History ==
Let’s Talk Science was founded in 1993 by Bonnie Schmidt, the current president, with contributions from Joan Francolini and the Lawson Foundation. While completing a Ph.D. in Physiology at the University of Western Ontario, Schmidt visited local classrooms with some of her fellow graduate students, bringing them hands-on science activities and presentations. The aim was to promote an interest in STEM from an early age and to help children and youth build inquiry-based skills.

The outreach program continues to grow with Let's Talk Science Outreach operating at 53 post-secondary schools from coast-to-coast-to-coast:

- 1991: Western University (as "Let's Talk Physiology")
- 1993: University of Ottawa, Queen's University
- 1995: University of Victoria, Simon Fraser University
- 1996: Memorial University of Newfoundland
- 1997: University of British Columbia, McMaster University, University of Toronto (St. George campus), University of Guelph
- 1998: McGill University, University of Alberta, University of Winnipeg
- 2000: Dalhousie University, University of Manitoba
- 2001: University of Calgary, Carleton University and the Mississauga campus of the University of Toronto.
- 2004: Scarborough campus of The University of Toronto, University of New Brunswick, University of Saskatchewan
- 2005: Cambrian College signs on as the first Let's Talk Science Outreach college partner.
- 2005: Laurentian University
- 2008: York University, Université du Québec à Montréal, University of Waterloo
- 2009: Fleming College, Confederation College, University of PEI
- 2010: Cape Breton University, University of New Brunswick in St. John, Lethbridge University, Université de Sherbrooke.
- 2011: Concordia University, University of Ontario Institute of Technology, Fanshawe College
- 2012: Memorial University of Newfoundland Grenfell campus, Mount Allison University
- 2013: University of Windsor, Loyalist College
- 2014: Toronto Metropolitan University (formerly Ryerson University)
- 2015: Université de Moncton, Brock University
- 2016: Brandon University, Lakehead University in Orillia and Thunder Bay,
- 2017: University of the Fraser Valley and University of British Columbia, Okanagan Campus, First Nations University of Canada, Aurora Research Institute- Western Arctic Research Centre
- 2018: Université du Québec à Chicoutimi
- 2019: Aurora Research Institute- South Slave Research Centre
- 2020: Vancouver Island University
- 2021: Trent University, Aurora Research Institute- North Slave Research Centre, Université du Québec à Rimouski
- 2022: Anishnabeg Outreach

In addition to the Outreach program that still provides workshops to classrooms, virtually and in person and at community events, Let’s Talk Science also offers professional learning opportunities for educators, online resources for youth and educators, and national virtual STEM events. Since 1993, Let’s Talk Science has impacted more than 13.8 million Canadian youth.

== Programming ==
=== Let’s Talk Science Outreach ===
A national program that connects educators and youth with trained volunteers (mainly post-secondary and graduate students) at over 50 Let’s Talk Science Outreach sites. The volunteers engage children from early years to Grade 12 in various curriculum-aligned, hands-on STEM activities virtually and in person. Visits are offered in English and French (location dependent) and are customizable and flexible for classrooms, community groups, libraries, summer camps and after-school programs.

=== Online Educational Resources ===
Let's Talk Science's website has a collection of curriculum-aligned STEM resources—lesson ideas, learning strategies, backgrounders, informative articles and career profiles in English and French.

- Career Resources Let’s Talk Science’s career resources are centred around a wide range of profiles from real people outlining what they were like in high school, their career path, what motivates them and why their jobs are important to others. There are also educator resources to help integrate career discussions into the classroom and give students a deeper understanding of how STEM skills can advance and expand career options.

The Let's Talk Careers competition is run twice a year in partnership with ChatterHigh. In 2020 Skills Canada joined on as a partner and in 2022 Engineers Canada joined as well.

=== Educator Professional Learning ===
Let's Talk Science's educator professional learning programming incorporates digital literacy and global competencies to solve real-world problems in the classroom. Delivery options include webinars, live broadcasts, self-paced learning, in-person training, seminars, summits and summer institutes.

=== Projects ===
Hands-on experiments that build inquiry and problem-solving skills as they learn to do real science and contribute to national databases.

- Tomatosphere™ A free program where tomato seeds that have travelled to the International Space Station (ISS), or have been exposed to simulated space conditions, and a control group of seeds are provided to educators along with educational resources. Students plant the seeds and compare the germination rates of the two sets in a blind study. After submitting their results, participants discover which packet contained which seeds. The program uses the excitement of space exploration to teach students the skills and processes of scientific experimentation and inquiry. Tomatosphere™ was launched in 2001 by parties at the Canadian Space Agency and Guelph University, Let's Talk Science took over operations in Canada in 2014. The current consortium of partners who oversee Tomatosphere™ include the Canadian Space Agency, HeinzSeed, Let’s Talk Science (operations in Canada), First-the-Seed Foundation (operations in the United States), Stokes Seeds, and the University of Guelph.
- Living Space Developed in partnership with the Canadian Space Agency, students study the key environmental conditions that are monitored on the ISS and develop their understanding of optimal ranges for human health. They collect data on their own environments and make a plan for environmental improvement based on those understandings. The national Living Space database allows students to compare their classroom data with information from other participating classrooms in Canada and data from the ISS.
- Clothing4Climate Participants in grades 7 to 12 learn about the science behind climate change, the impact our clothing system has on the environment, and how they can take action to make a difference.
- Lunar Rover Research Challenge Teams of students pitch their mission plans for the chance to remotely operate a Canadensys rover in a lunar-like environment.
- Travel4Climate A community-based and future-looking experience where students explore solutions that reduce emissions while improving their local conditions.

=== Events ===
Let’s Talk Science events allow students to interact with leading researchers, test their knowledge and design skills and participate in discussion about real-world STEM issues.

- The Let’s Talk Science Challenge A team-based, competitive enrichment event for grades 6–8 students offered virtually and in-person. The Let’s Talk Science Challenge includes a knowledge challenge and an interactive, hands-on engineering design challenge.
- High School Symposiums Full-, partial- or multi-day events hosted by post-secondary campuses across Canada that draw focus to timely and relevant STEM topics. Youth connect with leading researchers and volunteers to discuss the impact of their research and pathway to their current careers. Popular Symposiums include Let’s Talk Cancer, StemCellTalks, DNA Day, and Let’s Talk Neuroscience.
