= The Griffins' Nest =

Student-run newspaper in Vancouver, British Columbia

- "Informative, Impartial, Independent"
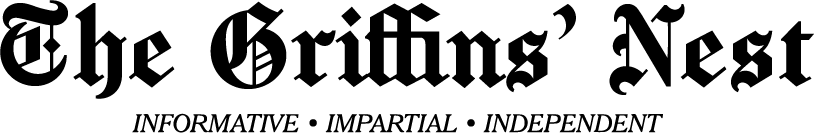

- Front page of the October 2025 issue (Volume 15, Issue 1)
- Type: Bimonthly
- School: Eric Hamber Secondary School
- Editor-in-chief: Zakaria Tucker
- Managing editor: Evîn Jaaf
- Headquarters: Eric Hamber Secondary School; 960 W 33rd Ave; Vancouver, BC; V5Z 0L2
- City: Vancouver
- Country: Canada
- Circulation: 950 (as of Volume 15, Issue 4)
- Website: ehnewspaper.ca
- Editorial staff
- Executive Editors: Eleanor Stiem; Nara Harvey; Leah Levine; Sophie Lee
- Design & Layout Editor: Trisha Tan
- Junior Design & Layout Editor: Ariel Lai

The Griffins' Nest (or The Nest for short) is the independent, student-run newspaper of Eric Hamber Secondary School, in Vancouver, British Columbia, Canada. Its print edition is published bimonthly. The newspaper received national attention in 2021 and 2022, when its editors campaigned against the censorship of its articles and British Columbian school newspapers in general.

== History ==
The Griffins' Nest, in its current form, was founded in 2012. Early proposals in October 2020 to create a website for The Nest were rejected by Eric Hamber's then principal Marea Jensen, who warned the newspaper's authors that "once it's out there, it's out there." The newspaper's then editor-in-chief Spencer Izen stated that he believed the reason for the rejection was to ensure that the newspaper was "kept within the school and couldn't be published outside." A website for The Nest was nonetheless created in August 2021.

The first, second, and third issues of The Nest in the 2020–21 school year (in December, February and May, respectively) came under scrutiny from Eric Hamber's administrative team. Then vice-principal Dale Ambrose expressed to The Nest his concerns about the newspaper's December 2020 issue, which included an article describing QAnon as a false conspiracy theory. Ambrose was concerned that the article would offend parents and guardians who believed in QAnon. He also voiced his concerns about the following February 2021 issue, which criticized the decision of the Vancouver School Board (VSB) to move to a quarter system, believing that its publication may be seen as an endorsement of its arguments by Eric Hamber's administrative team. However, both articles were ultimately allowed to go forward.

For the May 2021 issue, the editorial board of The Nest wrote an article which was critical of the VSB's decision-making process. The editorial called for greater consultation and "transparency on the direct correlation between student and teacher voice and [Vancouver School] Board action". Its publication, however, was halted by the administrative team, which informed Izen that "the article [would need] the principal's blessing". The editorial board of The Nest later learned that a request for comment (RFC) they had submitted to the VSB had been forwarded to Eric Hamber's principal without their knowledge.

The administrative team's decision prompted Izen and Jessica Kim, the newspaper's then managing editor, to contact the British Columbia Civil Liberties Association (BCCLA), the Canadian Association of Journalists and the Canadian Youth Journalism Project. BCCLA media lawyer and Toronto Metropolitan University journalism professor Lisa Taylor penned a number of letters to the VSB outlining the students' freedoms of the press and expression. According to Izen and Kim, this eventually led to the VSB allowing the issue to be published in June 2021. However, the VSB contends that it did not attempt to censor The Nest, that the forwarding of the RFC was standard practice, and that the administrative team of Eric Hamber simply wanted more time to review the editorial.

Upon learning of other alleged attempts at censoring school newspapers in British Columbia, Izen and Kim drafted the Student Press Freedom Act, which would protect the press freedom of students. The draft was reviewed by several lawyers, academics, and organizations, including Darrell Evans, founding president of the BC Freedom of Information and Privacy Association; Tamir Israel, staff lawyer with the Samuelson-Glushko Canadian Internet Policy and Public Interest Clinic; the BCCLA; and the Canadian Association of Journalists. In February 2022, an open letter was sent to then British Columbia attorney general David Eby alongside the draft of the act, calling for its introduction in the British Columbia Legislative Assembly. As of 2024, the act has yet to be introduced.

In June 2022, The Nest criticized guidelines introduced by the VSB to oversee the district's student clubs and their social media accounts, arguing that the guidelines violated students' freedoms of the press and expression.
