= Sir William Van Horne Elementary School =

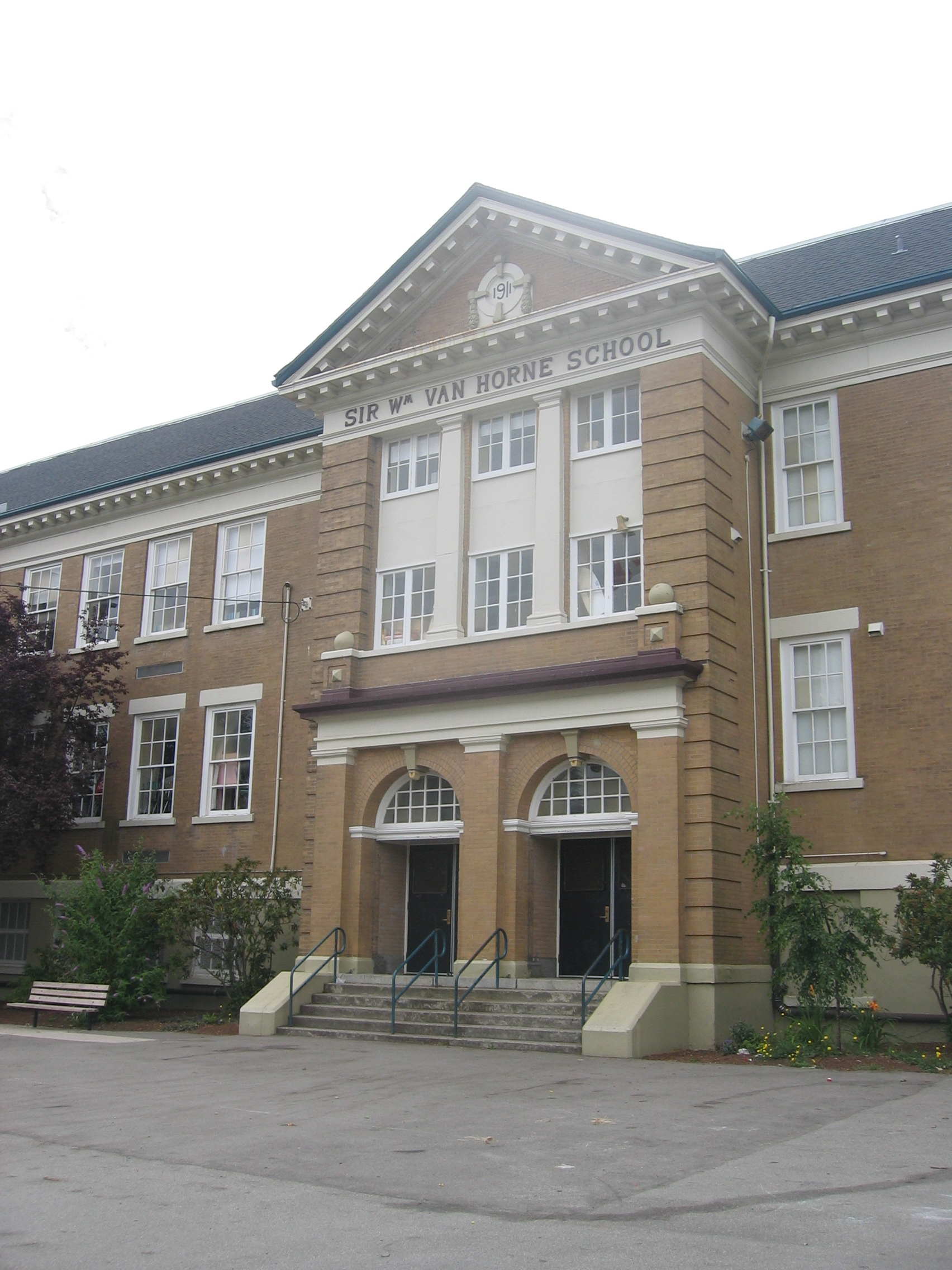

Location
- Vancouver, British Columbia, Canada; 49.2318°N 123.1063°W

Information
- Type: Elementary school
- Established: 1911
- Principal: Stephen Leung
- Enrollment: 398
- Colors: Blue, White, and Silver
- Nickname: Wildcats
- Website: https://www.vsb.bc.ca/schools/sir-william-van-horne/Pages/default.aspx

Sir William Van Horne Elementary School is a public elementary school located in Vancouver, British Columbia, Canada. Located at 5855 Ontario Street in School District 39 Vancouver, the school was built in 1911.

== Location ==
It is located in the Oakridge neighborhood of Vancouver. The school itself is located in the Eric Hamber Secondary catchment area.

== History ==
Van Horne was built in 1911, and was named after Sir William Cornelius Van Horne, the general manager of the Canadian Pacific Railway. The addition of a gymnasium and classrooms were added in later years. In 2003 the VSB began seismic upgrades on the school, including the re-arrangement of classrooms, the addition of new library and computer lab facilities. On the west side of the main building, there are two detached classrooms. On May 26, 2011, Van Horne celebrated its centennial.

== Architecture ==
The main building (built in 1911) was built in a neoclassical style with brick common to many Vancouver Schools built at the turn of the 20th century.

== Activities ==
The school has an array of activities including choir, a chess club, and coding club. The school usually has a yearly Terry Fox Run to raise money for cancer research in Canada.
