= Tom Thomson (Canadian football) =

Canadian football player

Profile
- Position: End

Personal information
- Born: 1942 (age 83–84); Scarborough, Ontario
- Listed height: 6 ft 1 in (1.85 m)
- Listed weight: 190 lb (86 kg)

Career information
- College: University of British Columbia
- CFL draft: 1964: 2nd round, 10th overall pick

Career history
- 1966–1967: Edmonton Eskimos

Tom Thomson (born 1942) is a former Canadian football player who played for the Edmonton Eskimos. After his athletic career, Thomson was a teacher, radio broadcaster, and local politician. A popular character in his town, residents of Whistler, British Columbia voted him “favorite Whistleriste” in 2010.

== Early life ==
Thomson was born and raised in Scarborough, Ontario, but moved to British Columbia at the age of 15. Thomson has stated that this move gave him a chance for a fresh start and was a positive change for him.

Thomason attended the University of British Columbia, where he played hockey and football.

== CFL Career ==
After graduation, Thomson went into the CFL and was an end for the Edmonton Eskimos. He left the CFL in 1967.

== Post-athletic career ==
After leaving the CFL, Thomson became a teacher at Eric Hamber High School in Vancouver, British Columbia. He taught for 30 years. Thomson also worked for a Vancouver radio station doing the marine patrol and snow reports.

After retiring from teaching, Thomson moved to Whistler, British Columbia.

== Local government ==
In his retirement, Thomson went into local politics and served on Whistler’s town council. He was acting mayor in 2010 when nearby Vancouver hosted the Olympics. Popular in his community, the town councilor was voted “favorite Whistlerite” by the readers of the local publication Pique News Magazine in 2010.

== Personal life ==
Thomson was an avid skier. He had one child, Tom Thomson Jr.
