= King Edward VII Hospital =

King Edward VII Hospital may refer to:

== England ==
- King Edward VII's Hospital, a private hospital in London that has treated members of the British royal family
- King Edward VII Hospital and Sanatorium, Easebourne (near Midhurst), West Sussex, opened in 1906 and closed in 2006; converted to housing
- King Edward VII Orthopaedic Hospital, Sheffield, a former hospital in South Yorkshire

== Other places ==
- King Edward VII Memorial Hospital, in Paget Parish, Bermuda
- King Edward VII Memorial Hospital, in Stanley, Falkland Islands
- King Edward VII Hospital, the name of Cardiff Royal Infirmary in Wales between 1911 and 1923

== See also ==
- Edward VII (disambiguation)
