= William Cornelius Van Horne =

American-Canadian businessman and art collector (1843–1915)

Sir William Cornelius Van Horne KCMG
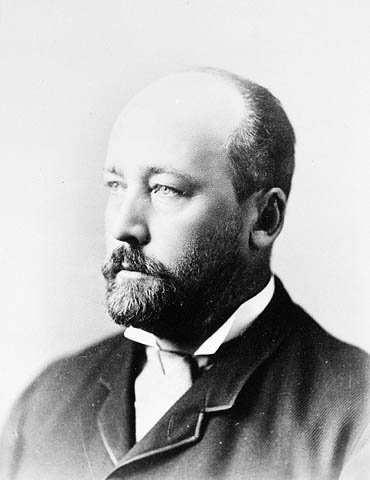
- Born: February 3, 1843 near Frankfort, Illinois, U.S.
- Died: September 11, 1915 (aged 72); Montreal, Quebec, Canada
- Spouse: Lucy Adaline Hurd (m. 1867–1915, his death)
- Children: Lucy Adaline Van Horne (1868–1941); William Cornelius Van Horne Jr. (1871–1876); Richard Benedict Van Horne (1877–1931)

Sir William Cornelius Van Horne, KCMG (February 3, 1843 – September 11, 1915) was an American businessman, industrialist and railroad magnate who spent most of his career in Canada. He is famous for overseeing the construction of the first Canadian transcontinental railway, a project that was completed in 1885, in under half the projected time. Van Horne succeeded Lord Mount Stephen as president of the Canadian Pacific Railway (CPR) in 1888, and was responsible for launching the sea transport division of the CPR, which inaugurated regular service between Vancouver and Hong Kong in 1891. He also presided over the expansion of the CPR into the luxury hotel business in the 1890s. Van Horne was also a prominent member of the syndicate that created the Cuba Railroad Company in 1900. He lived at the Van Horne Mansion in Montreal's Golden Square Mile.

== Ancestry and early life ==
Born on February 3, 1843, in rural Illinois, Van Horne moved with his family to Joliet, Illinois, at age eight. He was the eldest child of Cornelius Covenhoven Van Horne (1794–1854) by his second wife Mary Minier Richards of Sandusky, Ohio. Cornelius studied law at Union College, but took his family out west to seek his fortune farming. Misfortune followed as his house, barns, and law books were destroyed by fire, and his first wife died shortly afterwards. Abandoning farming, Cornelius returned to the law and became Recorder of Will County, Illinois, moving his family to Joliet, Illinois. He was active in getting the city its first charter, and because of this, Cornelius was elected Joliet's first mayor. When the city later built a new bridge it was named the Van Horne Bridge.

Van Horne's grandfather, Abraham Van Horne, graduated from Queens College (now Rutgers) with avocation for the ministry, and received his license to preach in 1792 from the Reformed Church of America. Van Horne held three pastorates, one at Wawarsing, one near Kingston, New York and his last at Caughnawaga (now Fonda, New York), from 1796 to 1833.

== Career ==
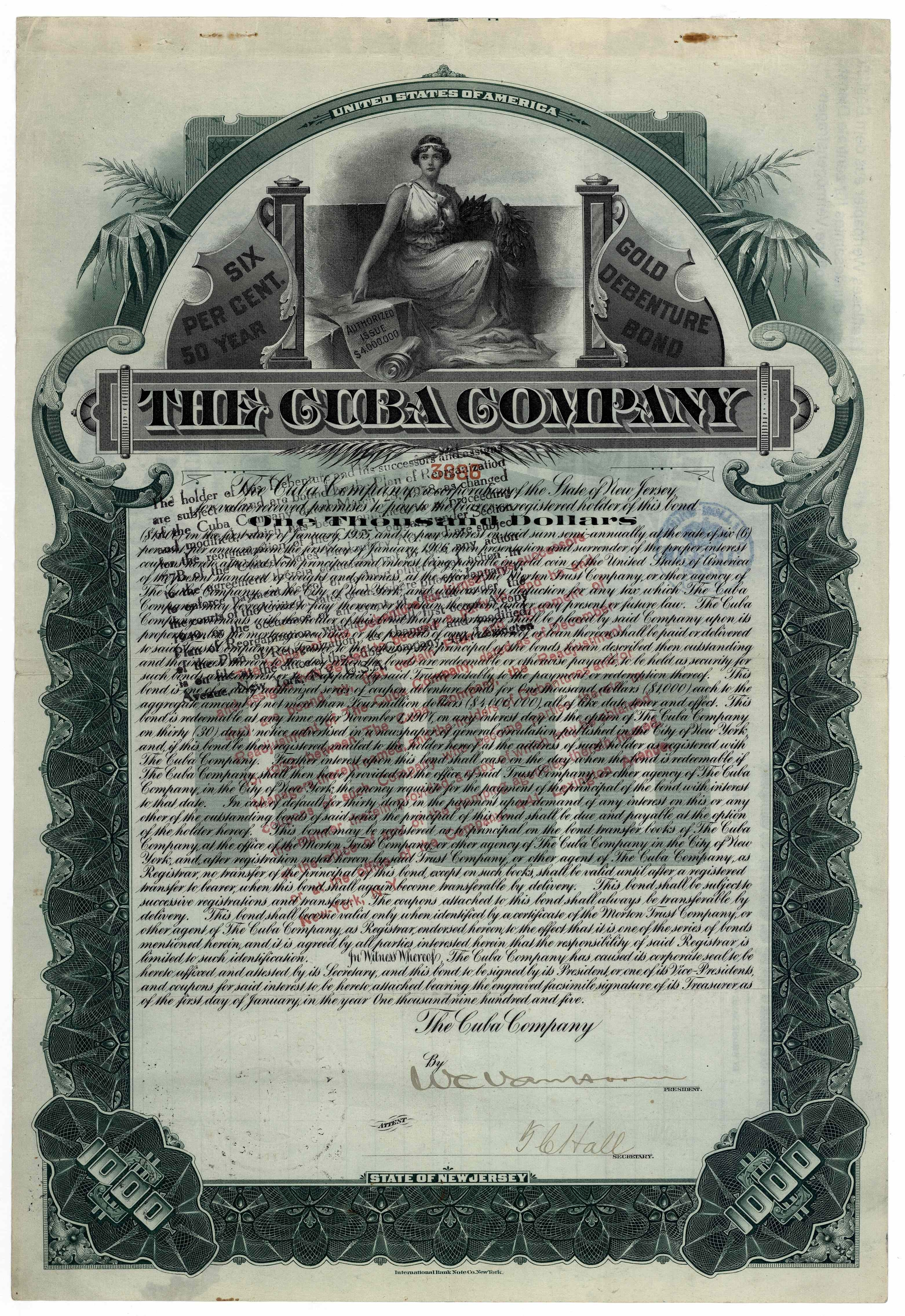
Gold Bond of the Cuba Company, issued 1 January 1905, signed by president Van Horne.

At age 14, Van Horne began working on railroads, serving in various capacities on the Illinois Central Railroad until 1864. He went on to work for the Chicago and Alton Railway, serving as general superintendent from 1878 to 1879. In 1882, Van Horne was appointed general manager of the Canadian Pacific Railway, becoming its vice-president in 1884 and president in 1888, finally becoming chairman of the board in 1899. He is most famous for overseeing the major construction of the first Canadian transcontinental railway, a project that, under his leadership, was completed in under half the projected time.

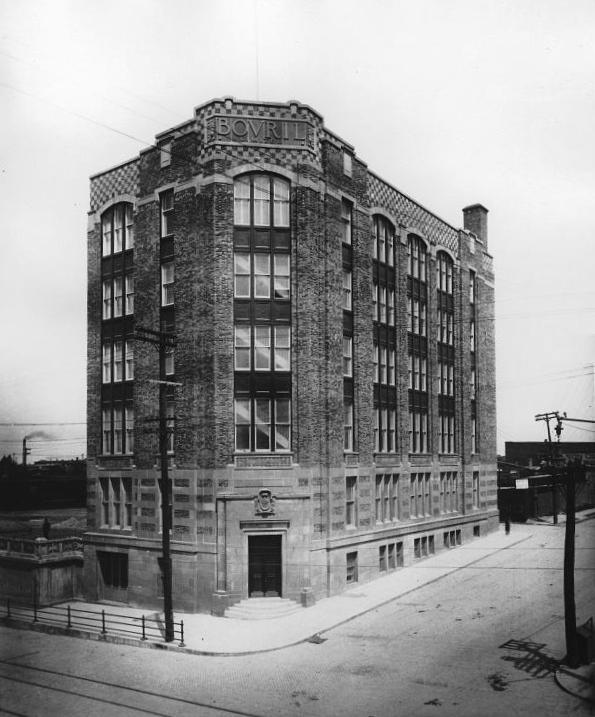
Bovril Building, corner Parc Avenue and Van Horne Avenue, Montreal 1921

Van Horne considered the railway an integrated communications and transportation system and convinced the directors and shareholders to create a telegraph service and an express freight delivery service as a complement to the railway. He was knowledgeable in nearly every element of the railway industry, including operating a locomotive. A wealthy man, Van Horne later became an investor of the Cuba Railroad Company, which built the first trans-country railway connecting Havana with the two eastern provinces (Camaguey and Oriente) and the city of Santiago de Cuba in 1901.

From 1885 onward, Van Horne was more and more associated with every branch of Canadian mercantile and financial life, and as a publicist gave expression to his views on political and economic questions. Van Horne was responsible for launching the sea transport division of the Canadian Pacific Railway, inaugurating a regular service between Vancouver and Hong Kong in 1891 on the Empress luxury liners. He also presided over the expansion of the CPR into the luxury hotel business and participated in the design of two of the most famous ones in the chain, the Château Frontenac in Quebec City and Chateau Lake Louise in Alberta.

== Personal life ==
Van Horne married Lucy Hurd in 1867, and they had three children. The elder son, William Jr., died at age four, while their daughter, Lucy Adeline "Addie", and younger son, Richard Benedict "Benny", lived to adulthood. Benny married Edith Molson of the Montreal Molsons, and they had a son, named William for his grandfather.

Sir William purchased and enlarged a house in 1889 later known as the Van Horne Mansion in Montreal, Quebec. Two years later, he began building his summer estate, which Van Horne named "Covenhoven", on Minister's Island, adjacent to CPR's resort town of St. Andrews, New Brunswick. The island estate is accessible by a natural sandbar road during the Bay of Fundy's low tide.

Van Horne was a governor of McGill University from 1895 to 1915 and was one of the first in Canada to acquire artworks by members of the French Impressionist movement. He himself was a painter, with Van Horne's surviving works now residing in museums such as the Montreal Museum of Fine Arts and Covenhoven itself. His other talents included sculpture, architecture, playing the violin, fossil collection, farming, botany and gardening.

Following Van Horne's death at the Royal Victoria Hospital, in Montreal on September 11, 1915, at age 72, his remains were interred at Oakwood Cemetery in Joliet, Illinois. Van Horne's Montreal home in the Golden Square Mile was controversially demolished in 1973.

== Honours ==
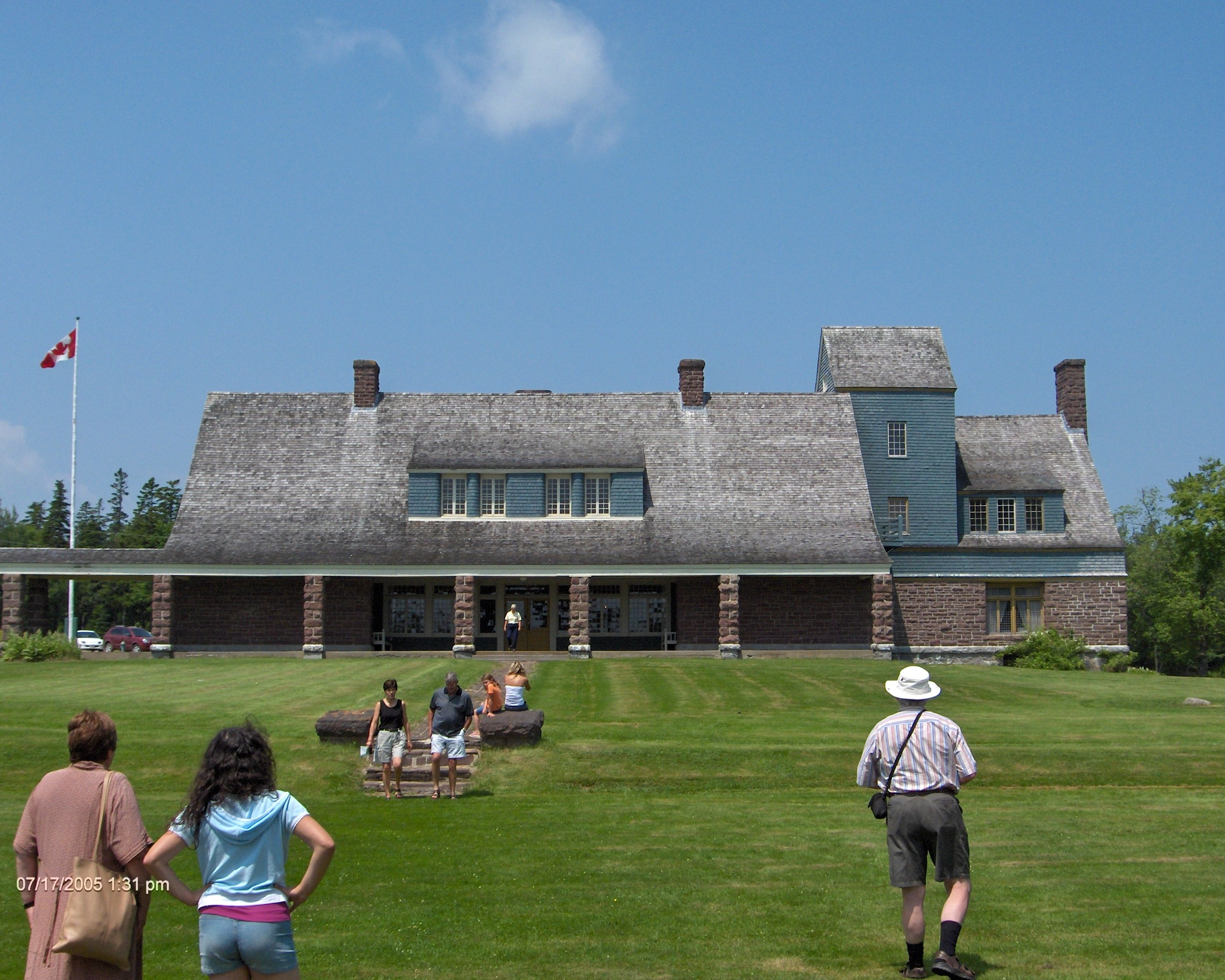
Covenhoven, the Van Horne Mansion on Minister's Island in Passamaquoddy Bay.

Van Horne was made an honorary Knight Commander of the Order of St Michael and St George in Queen Victoria's 1894 Birthday Honours. As an American citizen, he was technically not entitled to the prefix "Sir"; nonetheless, Van Horne was thereafter addressed as "Sir William".

The Van Horne Institute, based in Calgary, Alberta, is affiliated with the University of Calgary, Athabasca University and the University of Alberta and conducts research and policy studies related to all things carriage related, including rail, air, shipping, and road transportation, pipelines, electricity and information networks.

Sir William Van Horne Elementary School in Vancouver, B.C., is named after Van Horne, in honour of his contributions to British Columbia. There are streets named for him in several Canadian cities including Montreal, Toronto, Sudbury, Winnipeg, Brandon, and Regina. In Cuba, a borough (near to the railways) of the city of Camaguey, a street in front of the Camaguey railways station, and a small town in the province of Holguín are named after Van Horne.

Van Horne's summer estate on Minister's Island was designated a National Historic Site of Canada in 1996.

In 1999, William Van Horne was inducted into the North America Railway Hall of Fame in the category of "National: Railway Workers & Builders."

In 2011, Van Horne was featured in Rocky Mountain Express, a 45-minute IMAX film about the construction of the CPR.

== Archives ==
There is a Sir William Van Horne collection at Library and Archives Canada. Archival reference number is R7719.

== See also ==
- Katherine Angelina Hughes

Business positions
Preceded by George Stephen	President of Canadian Pacific Railway Limited; 1889–1899	Succeeded by Thomas George Shaughnessy
