= King Edward Avenue =

King Edward Avenue may refer to:

- King Edward Avenue (Vancouver)
- King Edward Avenue (Ottawa)
- King Edward Street, Oxford
