= Albert Edward Caswell =

American physicist

- Portrait of Albert Edward Caswell
- Born: May 24, 1884; Winnipeg, Manitoba, Canada
- Died: June 18, 1954 (aged 70); Eugene, Oregon
- Other name: A. E. Caswell
- Citizenship: American
- Education: Stanford University
- Known for: Properties of Metals
- Awards: American Physical Society Fellow, National Research Fellowship
- Scientific career
- Fields: Properties of Metals
- Workplaces: Stanford University; Purdue University; University of Oregon; Oregon State University; Princeton University; MIT Radiation Lab
- Thesis: Determination of Peltier Electromotive Force for Several Metals by Compensation of Methods (1911)
- Doctoral advisor: Fernando Sanford

Albert Edward Caswell (1884–1954), was head of the department of physics at the University of Oregon from 1934 to 1949, a professor emeritus, and Fellow of the American Physical Society.

== Early life and education ==
Albert Edward Caswell, son of John J. Caswell and Patience Ethel Smith, was born May 24, 1884, in Winnipeg, Manitoba, Canada. He married Mary Constance Edwards on July 3, 1912, in Santa Clara, California. They were parents of four children.

Caswell earned an A.B. in mathematics at Stanford University in 1908, and a Ph.D. in physics at Stanford in 1911. His dissertation, advised by Fernando Sanford, was titled, Determination of Peltier Electromotive Force for Several Metals by Compensation of Methods.

Caswell became a U.S. citizen December 22, 1909.

He was a member of the Central Presbyterian Church of Eugene and a trustee of the Westminster Foundation.

== Career ==
Caswell's first academic appointment was teaching at Stanford for three years, then teaching at Purdue University from 1911 to 1913. He joined the faculty at the University of Oregon, serving there between 1914 and 1949, and researching the properties of metals. He was a National Research Fellow at Princeton University in 1919–1920. From 1931 to 1933, he was transferred to Oregon State University, "as a result of the unification of the State System of Higher Education". He returned to the University of Oregon and was appointed chair of the department of physics in 1934. He was chair until 1949, and he was later named professor emeritus.

Caswell authored a widely used textbook in general physics. During World War II Caswell served on staff at the MIT Radiation Laboratory, where he led a section that produced instructional handbooks for prototype radar sets.

He died in Eugene, Oregon, on June 18, 1954.

== Selected publications ==
=== Books ===
- Caswell, A. E. (1928). An outline of physics. Macmillan.
- Caswell, A. E. (February 1944) Handbook of Instructions for AN/APA-9 radar set. Complete edition. (MIT Radiation Lab Rept M148C.) 253 p.

=== Journal articles ===
- Caswell, A. E. (November 1, 1911). "Determination of Peltier Electromotive Force for Several Metals by Compensation Methods". Physical Review. Series I. 33 (5): 379–402. Bibcode:1911PhRvI..33..379C. doi:10.1103/PhysRevSeriesI.33.379.
- Caswell, A. E. (February 1, 1916). "Tests of Thermo-electric Formulae Based on Bismuth and Bismuth-Tin Alloys". Physical Review. 7 (2): 269–277. Bibcode:1916PhRv....7..269C. doi:10.1103/PhysRev.7.269.
- Caswell, A. E.; McKay, Cecil A. (September 1, 1918). "Conductivities and Thermo-Electric Powers of Bismuth-Tin Alloys". Physical Review. 12 (3): 226–230. Bibcode:1918PhRv...12..226C. doi:10.1103/PhysRev.12.226.
- Caswell., A. E. (September 1, 1918). "Thomson Effect in Bismuth-Tin Alloys". Physical Review. 12 (3): 231–237. Bibcode:1918PhRv...12..231C. doi:10.1103/PhysRev.12.231.
- Caswell, A. E. (June 1, 1919). "An Extension of the Electron Theory of Metals. I. Thermoelectricity and Metallic Conduction". Physical Review. 13 (6): 386–403. Bibcode:1919PhRv...13..386C. doi:10.1103/PhysRev.13.386.
- Caswell., A. E. (January 1, 1920). "An Extension of the Electron Theory of Metals". Physical Review. 15 (1): 1–11. Bibcode:1920PhRv...15....1C. doi:10.1103/PhysRev.15.1.
- Caswell, A. E. (September 1, 1922). "The Hall, Ettingshausen, Nernst and Leduc Effects in Cadmium, Nickel and Zinc". Physical Review. 20 (3): 280–282. Bibcode:1922PhRv...20..280C. doi:10.1103/PhysRev.20.280.
- Caswell, A. E. (April 5, 1929). "A Relation between the Mean Distances of the Planets from the Sun". Science. 69 (1788): 384. Bibcode:1929Sci....69..384C. doi:10.1126/science.69.1788.384. ISSN 0036-8075. PMID 17784026.
- Caswell, A. E. (September 1, 1934). "The Content of the First Year Course in College Physics". American Journal of Physics. 2 (3): 95–98. Bibcode:1934AmJPh...2...95C. doi:10.1119/1.1992886. ISSN 0002-9505.
- Caswell, A. E.; Gordy, Walter (October 1, 1945). "A Proposed Reorganization of Undergraduate Physics". American Journal of Physics. 13 (5): 315–317. Bibcode:1945AmJPh..13..315C. doi:10.1119/1.1990736. ISSN 0002-9505.

== Awards, honors ==
- July 4, 1919, National Research Fellowship, Princeton University.
- 1945, American Physical Society Fellow: A. E. Caswell, University of Oregon
