= King Edward station =

Metro Vancouver SkyTrain station

King Edward
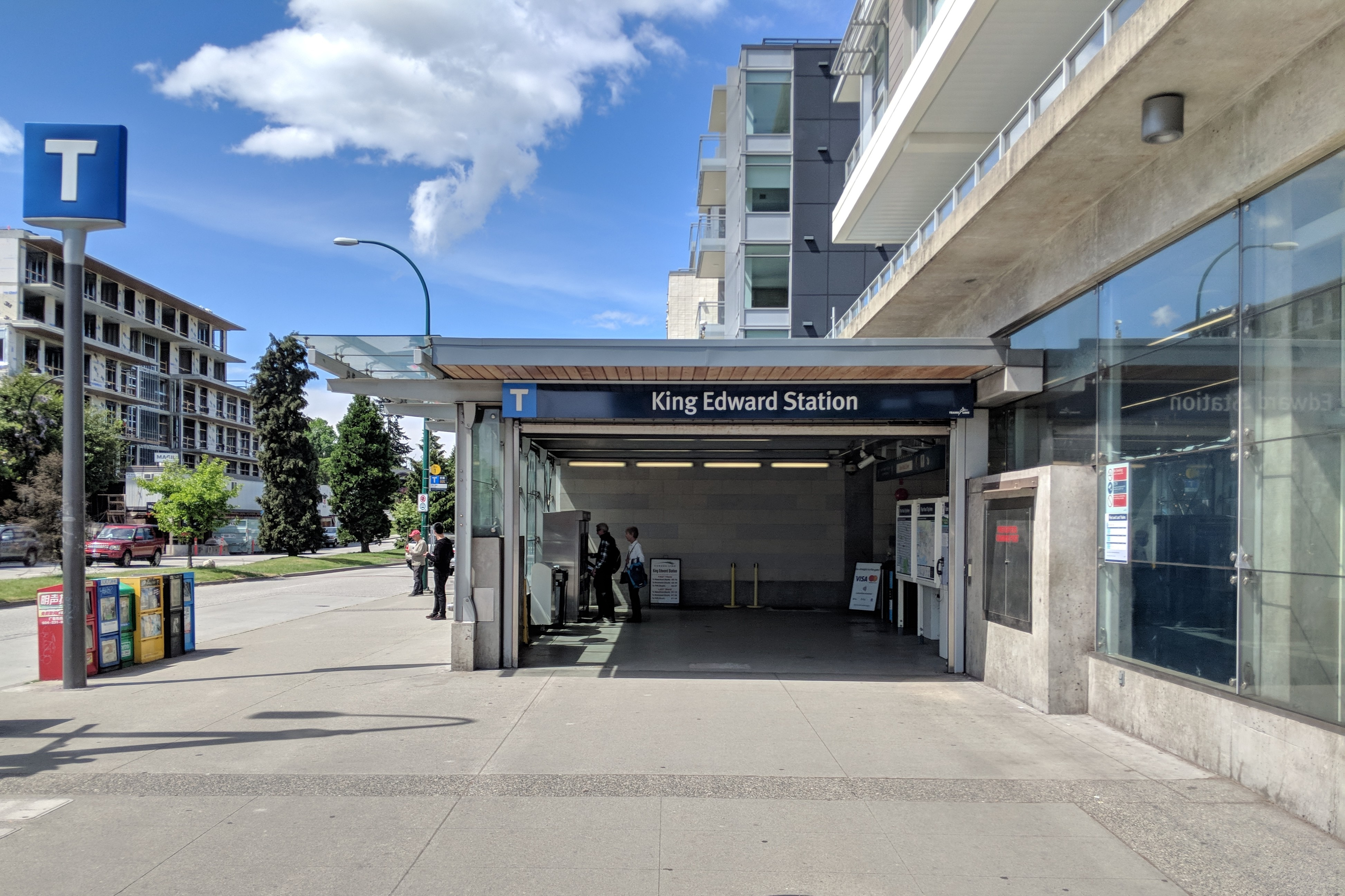
- King Edward station entrance in 2019

General information
- Location: 4099 Cambie Street, Vancouver
- Coordinates: 49°14′57″N 123°6′57″W
- System: SkyTrain station
- Owner: TransLink
- Platforms: Split platforms
- Tracks: 2

Construction
- Structure type: Subway
- Accessible: yes
- Architect: VIA Architecture

Other information
- Station code: KE
- Fare zone: 1

History
- Opened: August 17, 2009

Passengers
- 2025: 2,155,000 ▲1.3%
- Rank: 29 of 54

Services
Preceding station	TransLink	Following station
Broadway–City Hall towards Waterfront	Canada Line	Oakridge–41st Avenue towards Richmond–Brighouse or YVR–Airport
Location

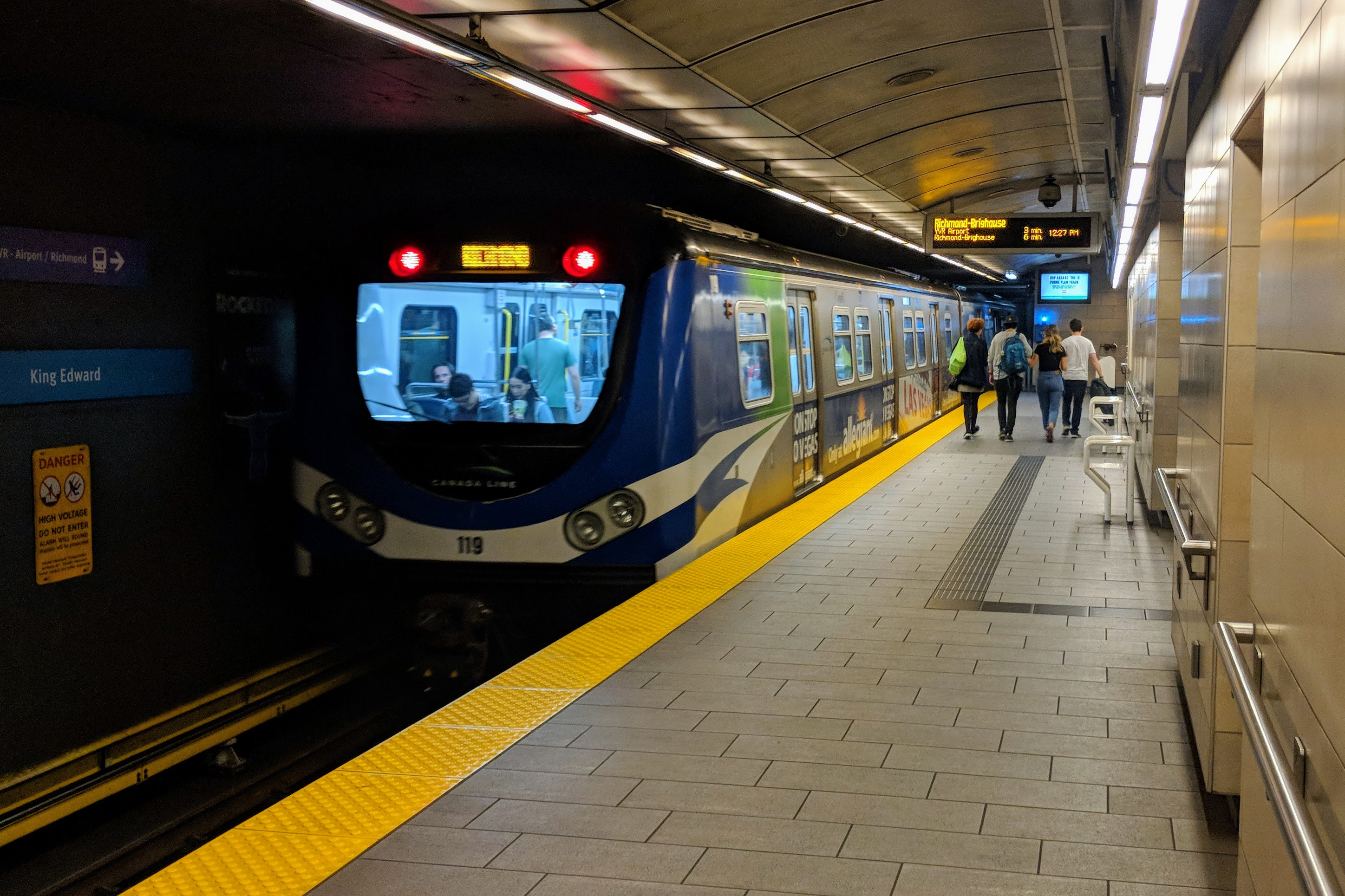
An outbound train departing King Edward station; the outbound platform is located below the inbound platform.

King Edward is an underground station on the Canada Line of Metro Vancouver's SkyTrain rapid transit system. The station is located at the intersection of Cambie Street and King Edward Avenue in Vancouver, British Columbia, Canada, and serves the neighbourhoods of Riley Park–Little Mountain and South Cambie. The station is within walking distance of BC Children's Hospital, Nat Bailey Stadium, and Queen Elizabeth Park.

== History ==
King Edward station was opened in 2009 along with the rest of the Canada Line and was designed by the architecture firm VIA Architecture. The station is named for nearby King Edward Avenue, which in turn is named after King Edward VII.

== Structure and design ==
Like Burrard and Granville stations, King Edward station has a distinctive platform design. The inbound track to Waterfront is stacked above the outbound track to Richmond–Brighouse and YVR–Airport.

== Services ==
The station is served by the #15 bus providing local surface service along Cambie Street, by the #25 bus operating east to Brentwood Town Centre station and west to the University of British Columbia, and by the #33 bus operating east to 29th Avenue station and west to the University of British Columbia.

== Station information ==
=== Entrances ===
King Edward station is served by a single entrance at the northwest corner of Cambie Street and King Edward Avenue.

=== Transit connections ===
The following bus routes can be found in close proximity to King Edward station:

Bay	Location	Routes
1	King Edward Avenue; Westbound	25 UBC
2	Cambie Street; Northbound	15 Olympic Village Station; 33 UBC; N15 Downtown (NightBus service)
3	King Edward Avenue; Eastbound	25 Brentwood Station
4	Cambie Street; Southbound	15 Cambie; 33 29th Avenue Station; N15 Cambie (NightBus service)

== See also ==
- Royal eponyms in Canada
