= Albert Edward Smith (disambiguation) =

Albert Edward Smith (1871–1947) was a Canadian politician.

Albert Edward Smith may also refer to:

- Albert Edward Smith (1871–1923), founder of the Australian company AE Smith
- Albert E. Smith (producer) (1875–1958), American film director and producer
- Albert Smith (South Australian politician) (1881–1965)
