= South Cambie =

Coordinates: 49.246°N 123.122°W

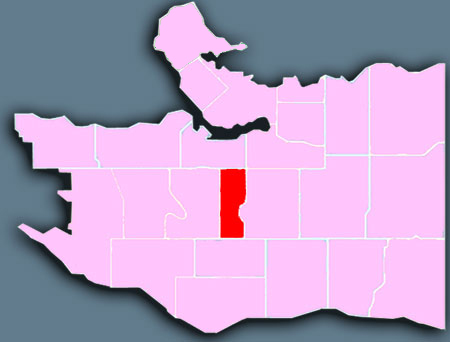
Location of South Cambie in Vancouver.

South Cambie is a neighbourhood in the city of Vancouver, British Columbia, Canada, that is generally considered one of the smallest neighbourhoods in the city, both in size and in population. It is wedged between one of the city's largest parks and the upscale neighbourhood of Shaughnessy, and is known for a large cluster of medical facilities.

== Geography ==
Wedged between Queen Elizabeth Park on the slopes of Vancouver's Little Mountain to the east and the high-priced homes of Shaughnessy on the west, South Cambie is a narrow strip of land encompassing 217 hectares. It is located between the busy north–south corridors of Oak Street and just east of Cambie Street, and stretches from W.16th Avenue in the north to West 41st in the south.

== History ==
A part of a land grant given to the Canadian Pacific Railway in the 1800s, Cambie Street was named after CPR engineer Henry Cambie, who was in charge of the railway's western division. The first colonial settlers arrived in 1874 when William Mackie, a former gold miner, claimed 65 hectares of land surrounding a former elk pasture that is now Douglas Park, on West 22nd Avenue. He was followed by Jeremiah Rogers, who became one of the first users of mechanized logging equipment in British Columbia, building a road to the top of Little Mountain. By 1910, that portion of the land had become a Chinese vegetable garden, and homes began to appear around it. Much of the land remained undeveloped until the 1940s.

== Demographics ==
The population of South Cambie was 6,995, according to the 2001 Census; 49.4 percent of respondents listed English as their mother tongue, with Chinese the next largest group at 26.4 percent.

Panethnic groups in the South Cambie neighbourhood (2001−2016)
Panethnic group	2016		2006		2001	
Panethnic group	Pop.	%	Pop.	%	Pop.	%
European (Note: Statistic includes all persons that did not make up part of a visible minority or an indigenous identity.)	4,175	55.19%	4,200	61.54%	3,945	59.06%
East Asian (Note: Statistic includes total responses of "Chinese", "Korean", and "Japanese" under visible minority section on census.)	2,310	30.54%	2,165	31.72%	2,285	34.21%
South Asian	325	4.3%	80	1.17%	65	0.97%
Southeast Asian (Note: Statistic includes total responses of "Filipino" and "Southeast Asian" under visible minority section on census.)	310	4.1%	145	2.12%	190	2.84%
Indigenous	120	1.59%	35	0.51%	25	0.37%
Middle Eastern (Note: Statistic includes total responses of "West Asian" and "Arab" under visible minority section on census.)	65	0.86%	85	1.25%	15	0.22%
Latin American	90	1.19%	20	0.29%	35	0.52%
African	70	0.93%	50	0.73%	60	0.9%
Other/Multiracial (Note: Statistic includes total responses of "Visible minority, n.i.e." and "Multiple visible minorities" under visible minority section on census.)	110	1.45%	30	0.44%	40	0.6%
Total responses	7,565	94.92%	6,825	96.53%	6,680	95.5%
Total population	7,970	100%	7,070	100%	6,995	100%
Note: Totals greater than 100% due to multiple origin responses

== Features ==
A number of heritage structures can be found in the South Cambie area, including the 1912 Tudor-style building that houses a Royal Canadian Mounted Police training facility on Heather Street. A number of other heritage homes from the 1910s and 1920s can be found in the northern portion of the neighbourhood.

The South Cambie area includes two specialized provincial medical facilities, including BC Children's Hospital and BC Women's Hospital and Health Centre. It was also the site of historic Shaughnessy Hospital, used extensively during World Wars I and II.

The South Cambie area is also home to several educational institutions including Eric Hamber Secondary School, Emily Carr Elementary School, Edith Cavell Elementary School, & French language schools École Rose-des-Vents and École secondaire Jules-Verne, both operated by Conseil scolaire francophone de la Colombie-Britannique.

== Canada Line ==
The Canada Line rapid transit system traverses the entire length of Cambie Street through the South Cambie neighbourhood. The project was completed in August 2009. A possible infill station at 33rd Avenue was noted during initial construction, but no plans have yet been made.
