= Edward Windsor =

Edward Windsor may refer to:

- Edward III, King of England (1312–1377; r. 1327–1377), known as Edward of Windsor prior to his accession
- Edward Windsor, 3rd Baron Windsor (1532–1574), English noble
- Edward Windsor (cricketer) (1869–1953), Australian cricketer
- Edward VIII, King of the United Kingdom (1894–1972; r. 1936), member of the House of Windsor by birth
- Prince Edward, Duke of Kent (born 1935), member of the House of Windsor by birth
- Prince Edward, Duke of Edinburgh (born 1964), member of the House of Windsor by birth
- Edward Windsor, Lord Downpatrick (born 1988), British travel consultant, fashion designer and eldest grandchild of Prince Edward, Duke of Kent

== See also ==
- Edward Winsor Kemble (1861–1933), American illustrator
- Edward Windsor Richards (1831–1921), British engineer
- Edward of England (disambiguation)
- Prince Edward (disambiguation)
