= Eddie King (footballer, born 1914) =

English footballer (1914–1993)

Personal information
- Full name: Edgar Frederick King
- Date of birth: 28 February 1914
- Place of birth: Hackney, England
- Date of death: 1993 (aged 78–79)
- Position: Left back

Youth career
- Tottenham Juniors

Senior career*
Years	Team	Apps	(Gls)
- Tufnell Park
- Northfleet United
1934	Tottenham Hotspur	1	(0)
- * Club domestic league appearances and goals

Edgar Frederick King (25 February 1914 – 1993) was an English professional footballer who played for Tottenham Juniors, Tufnell Park, Northfleet United and Tottenham Hotspur.

== Football career ==
King began his career at Tottenham Juniors before joining non-League Tufnell Park. After a spell with the Tottenham Hotspur "nursery" team Northfleet United the left back signed for Tottenham in 1934. He went on to play one match for the Spurs.
