= Skills Canada =

Canadian nonprofit organization

Skills Canada (French: Compétences Canada) is a Canadian non-profit organization dedicated to the promotion of careers in technology and skilled trades. One of their major initiatives is the annual Skills Canada National Competition. This is an Olympic-style event in which competitors from across the country take part in various skilled trades and technology contests. Each Canadian province and territory has its own chapter of Skills Canada and they hold qualifying provincial competitions in their respective areas to determine their provincial and territorial candidates who will participate at the annual Canadian event.

Competitors may participate at either the secondary, post-secondary, or Team Canada level. The purpose of Skills Canada is to promote skilled careers in trades and technologies to youth and the future generation.

Canada is experiencing a shortage of skilled labourers, and Skills Canada hopes to fill in that gap. The baby boom generation has reached retirement age and the country is having difficulty retaining workers, adding to the shortage. Competitions are held at the provincial and territorial levels, with the best competitors from each province reaching the national event. Biannually, the top competitors in the country are invited to represent Canada at the WorldSkills competition, an international event hosted by WorldSkills International which is attended by competitors from 85 member countries and regions.

== Competition areas ==
Areas of competition at the annual Skills Canada National Competition are divided into six sectors. These sectors and competitions are:

=== Construction Sector ===
- Electrical Installations
- Architectural Technology & Design
- Brick Masonry
- Cabinetmaking
- Carpentry
- Automation & Control
- Landscape Gardening
- Plumbing
- Refrigeration & Air Conditioning
- Sheet Metal Work
- Welding
- Steamfitter/Pipefitter
- Sprinkler Systems

=== Employment Sector ===
- Job Interview
- Job Skill Demonstration
- Public Speaking
- Workplace Safety
- Job Search

=== Information Technology ===
- 2D & 3D Computer Animation
- 3D Digital Game Art
- Electronics
- Graphic Design
- Web Design & Development
- IT Network Systems Administrations
- IT Office Software Applications
- Video Production
- Mechanical CADD
- Architectural Technology & Design
- Photography

=== Manufacturing and Engineering Sector ===
- CNC Machining
- Industrial Mechanic/Millwright
- Mechatronics
- Precision Machining
- Mobile Robotics
- Mechatronics

=== Services Sector ===
- Baking
- Cooking
- Hairstyling
- Aesthetics
- Fashion Technology

=== Transportation Sector ===
- Aerospace Technology
- Automotive Service
- Autobody Repair
- Car Painting
- Heavy Equipment Service
- Outdoor Power & Recreation Equipment

== Competitions ==
To date, 30 Skills Canada National Competitions have been held. In 2020 the event had been scheduled to be held in Vancouver, British Columbia but it was cancelled owing to the COVID-19 pandemic. The next competition will be held in Toronto, Ontario in 2026.

Event	City	Province	Year
31	Toronto	Ontario	2026
30	Regina	Saskatchewan	2025
29	Québec City	Québec	2024
28	Winnipeg	Manitoba	2023
27	Vancouver	British Columbia	2022
26	(Virtual)		2021
25	Halifax	Nova Scotia	2019
24	Edmonton	Alberta	2018
23	Winnipeg	Manitoba	2017
22	Moncton	New Brunswick	2016
21	Saskatoon	Saskatchewan	2015
20	Toronto	Ontario	2014
19	Vancouver	British Columbia	2013
18	Edmonton	Alberta	2012
17	Quebec City	Quebec	2011
16	Waterloo	Ontario	2010
15	Charlottetown	Prince Edward Island	2009
14	Calgary	Alberta	2008
13	Saskatoon	Saskatchewan	2007
12	Halifax	Nova Scotia	2006
11	Edmonton	Alberta	2005
10	Winnipeg	Manitoba	2004
9	Kitchener	Ontario	2003
8	Vancouver	British Columbia	2002
7	Edmonton	Alberta	2001
6	Quebec City	Quebec	2000
5	Kitchener	Ontario	1999
4	Vancouver	British Columbia	1998
3	Red Deer	Alberta	1997
2	Montreal	Quebec	1996
1	Hamilton	Ontario	1994
