= Mount Albert =

Mount Albert may refer to:

== Settlements ==
- Mount Albert, New Zealand, a suburb of Auckland, New Zealand
  - Mount Albert (New Zealand electorate), based on Mount Albert
  - Mount Albert Lions, a rugby league team
- Mount Albert, Ontario, an exurb not far from Toronto, Ontario, Canada
- Mont-Albert, Quebec, an unorganized territory
- Mont Albert, Victoria, a suburb of Melbourne, Victoria, Australia

== Mountains ==
- Mount Albert (British Columbia), a mountain in British Columbia north of Princess Louisa Inlet
- Ōwairaka / Mount Albert, a volcanic cone in the Auckland Volcanic Field
- Albert Mountain (North Carolina), a mountain in North Carolina's Nantahala Range
- Mount Albert (Quebec), a mountain in Gaspesia's Chic-Choc Mountains Range
- Mount Albert Edward (British Columbia), a mountain on Vancouver Island
- Mount Albert, a spur to the south of Mount Victoria, Wellington
