= Prince Edward =

Prince Edward may refer to:

== People ==
- Edward the Black Prince (1330–1376), eldest son of King Edward III and father of King Richard II
- Edward of Westminster, Prince of Wales (1453–1471), son of King Henry VI of England and Margaret of Anjou
- Edward V of England (1470–1483), son of Edward IV and Elizabeth Woodville
- Edward of Middleham, Prince of Wales, (1474–1484), son of Richard III of England and Anne Neville
- Prince Edward, Duke of York and Albany (1739–1767), younger brother of King George III
- Prince Edward, Duke of Kent and Strathearn (1767–1820), fourth son of King George III and father of Queen Victoria
- Prince Edward of Saxe-Weimar (1823–1902), British military officer
- Edward VII of the United Kingdom (1841–1910), eldest son of Queen Victoria
- Edward VIII of the United Kingdom, (1894–1972), first child and eldest son of George V, later The Prince Edward, Duke of Windsor
- Prince Edouard de Lobkowicz (1926–2010), Austrian-American diplomat and financier
- Prince Edward, Duke of Kent (born 1935), a male-line grandson of George V
- Prince Edouard-Xavier de Lobkowicz (1960–1984), French murder victim and eldest son of Edouard de Lobkowicz
- Prince Edward, Duke of Edinburgh (born 1964), youngest child of Queen Elizabeth II

== Fictional people ==
- Prince Edward, fiancé to Giselle in the 2007 film Enchanted

== Places ==
- Prince Edward Theatre, West End Theatre in London
- Prince Edward Island, province of Canada
- Prince Edward County, Ontario, single-tier census division of the Canadian province
- Prince Edward (federal electoral district), a riding for the Canadian House of Commons
- Prince Edward Islands, group of two islands in the sub-Antarctic Indian Ocean
- Prince Edward County, Virginia, United States
- Prince Edward Road, a major road in Hong Kong, named after Edward VIII
  - Prince Edward station, a station next to the road
  - Prince Edward, Hong Kong, the area around the station
- Prince Edward Road MRT station, a rapid transit station in Singapore
- Prince Edward School, Zimbabwe

== See also ==
- King Edward (disambiguation)
