= King Edward =

King Edward may refer to:

== People ==
=== England and the United Kingdom ===
- Edward the Elder (c. 871–924)
- Edward the Martyr (c. 962–978)
- Edward the Confessor (c. 1004–1066)
- Edward I of England (1239–1307)
- Edward II (1284–1327)
- Edward III of England (1312–1377)
- Edward IV (1442–1483)
- Edward V (1470–1483?)
- Edward VI (1537–1553)
- Edward VII (1841–1910)
- Edward VIII (1894–1972)

=== Elsewhere ===
- Edward, King of Portugal (Portuguese: Duarte, 1391–1438)
- Edward Bruce (Middle Irish: Edubard a Briuis, c. 1275–1318), High King of Ireland
- Edward Balliol (c. 1282–1364), King of Scots, considered a usurper

=== Fiction ===
- Edward the Benevolent, predecessor to Graham as King of Daventry in the King's Quest series of PC games

== Places ==
- King Edward, Aberdeenshire, Scotland
- King Edward Avenue (disambiguation)
- King Edward station, a rapid transit station in Vancouver, Canada

=== Buildings and organisations ===
- King Edward Hotel (Toronto), Ontario, Canada
- King Edward Hotel (Jackson, Mississippi), a former hotel in the US
- King Edward Medical University, in Lahore, Pakistan
- King Edward's School (disambiguation)

== Other uses ==
- King Edward VII-class battleship, a class of Royal Navy battleships
  - HMS King Edward VII, the lead ship of her class
- King Edward potato, a potato cultivar

== See also ==
- Edward King (disambiguation)
