= Minoru (disambiguation) =

Minoru is a masculine Japanese given name.

Minoru may also refer to:

== Places ==
- Minoru Park, park located in Richmond, British Columbia
- Minoru Chapel, Richmond, British Columbia

== Products ==
- Minoru 3D Webcam

== Other ==
- Minoru (horse), King Edward VII's horse that won the 1909 Epsom Derby
