= Shellmont, Richmond =

Shellmont
- Neighbourhood
- Nickname: Ironwood
- Location of Shellmont in Richmond

- Location in Metro Vancouver
- Coordinates: 49.140730°N 123.102624°W
- Country: Canada
- Province: British Columbia
- City: Richmond

Area
  - Total: 4.68 km^{2} (1.81 sq mi)

Population (2021)
  - Total: 11,420
  - Density: 2,440/km^{2} (6,300/sq mi)
- Forward sortation area: V7A, V6W

Shellmont is a neighbourhood located in Richmond, British Columbia. The neighbourhood is bounded by Highway 99 and No. 5 Road in the east, the Francis Road in the north, Shell Road and No. 4 Road in the west, and the Fraser River in the south.

The neighbourhood is anchored by Ironwood Plaza at the intersection of Steveston Highway and No. 5 Road. This commercial node provides the surrounding residential blocks with grocery options, medical services, financial institutions, and local dining amenities.

The neighbourhood is divided into two distinct uses. The area north of Steveston Highway is primarily residential, while the area south is commercial and industrial.

== History ==
=== Early settlement and establishment (1874-1893) ===
The modern history of the Shellmont area is closely tied to the development of Woodward's Landing, a vital early marine transportation hub on the South Arm of the Fraser River. In 1874, Nathan Woodward, an experienced boat builder, and his son, Daniel, arrived from Ontario to homestead on Lulu Island. The Woodwards settled a tract of land extending from present-day No. 5 Road south to the riverfront, and west toward Garden City Road, an area then characterized by a network of tidal sloughs.

The family constructed their first cabin prior to 1875. Nathan Woodward became an active figure in early civic affairs and was one of the local landowners who signed the original 1879 petition for the incorporation of the Municipality of Richmond.

In 1893, the municipality purchased a fraction of an acre of riverfront property from Woodward to construct a public wharf. Named Woodward's Landing, the pier became a critical stop for private and commercial vessels navigating a regional maritime route that linked Richmond with Ladner and New Westminster.

=== Commercial growth and transport infrastructure (1893–1921) ===
The establishment of the wharf catalyzed the local economy, serving as a primary shipping point for agricultural produce from Richmond's rapidly expanding farming sector. Due to the high volume of cargo and freight moving through the area, the municipality appointed Nathan Woodward as the site's inaugural wharfinger (wharf manager) to oversee operations.

By the onset of the First World War, the position of wharfinger had been assumed by John George Lemon, who also operated a small confectionery store at the landing to serve travelers and river workers.

In 1921, sparks from a waterborne pile driver ignited a fire at the waterfront, entirely destroying the wooden wharf and its adjacent commercial buildings. The infrastructure was rapidly rebuilt by the municipality, which constructed a larger pier and a new freight warehouse to accommodate the growing trade along the No. 5 Road corridor.

=== Ferry era and industrial transition (1920s-1950s) ===
The role of Woodward's Landing shifted significantly with the introduction of a regular vehicle ferry service across the Fraser River to Ladner. This development transformed the river landing into a high-traffic commercial corridor, requiring the conversion of surrounding agricultural land for vehicle parking, staging lanes, and passenger services. This concentration of transport infrastructure laid the groundwork for the modern industrial and residential footprint of the Shellmont neighbourhood. By 1949, the ferry was so popular that the "Delta Princess" was introduce, doubling capacity to 30 cars.

=== Suburbanization (1960s-Present) ===
The opening of the George Massey Tunnel, originally known as the Deas Island Tunnel, in 1959 decommissioned the local ferry service and fundamentally altered Shellmont's land-use patterns, shifting the area away from river-based transit and paving the way for large-scale master-planned residential subdivisions. The physical landscape of the neighbourhood largely reflects these twentieth-century post-war housing booms.

Roughly 45% of properties in the area were built during the 1960s and 1970s, establishing the community's foundational suburban layout. The majority of the remaining buildings were constructed during subsequent waves of intensification and redevelopment in the 1980s and the 2000s, transforming former agricultural tracts into modern single-family pockets, townhouses, and light industrial business parks.

In the 1970s, the Art Knapp plant store at the northeast corner of Steveston Highway and No. 5 Road opened an amusement park and garden, known as Fantasy Gardens. The amusement park subsequently closed down in 2010.

In 1998, Ironwood Plaza was completed at the southwest corner of Steveston Highway and No. 5 Road by developer Westbank Projects, making it one of the company's first projects. The shopping centre brought in major anchor tenants, such as a branch of the Richmond Public Library, London Drugs, which operates their headquarters in the neighbourhood, and Save-On-Foods.

== Demographics ==
The 2021 census found that English was spoken as mother tongue by 53.4% of the population. The next most common mother tongue language was Cantonese, spoken by 12.8% of the population, followed by Mandarin at 8.9%.

Panethnic groups in the Shellmont neighbourhood (2021)
Panethnic group	2021
Panethnic group	%
East Asian (Note: Statistic includes total responses of "Chinese", "Korean", and "Japanese" under visible minority section on census.)	38.2%
European (Note: Statistic includes all persons that did not make up part of a visible minority or an indigenous identity.)	24.2%
Southeast Asian (Note: Statistic includes total responses of "Filipino" and "Southeast Asian" under visible minority section on census.)	10.3%
South Asian	20.3%
Middle Eastern (Note: Statistic includes total responses of "West Asian" and "Arab" under visible minority section on census.)	2.3%
Latin American	1.1%
African	0.7%
Other/multiracial (Note: Statistic includes total responses of "Visible minority, n.i.e." and "Multiple visible minorities" under visible minority section on census.)	2.7%
Total population	100%
Note: Totals greater than 100% due to multiple origin responses

== Transportation ==
Shellmont has a high reliance on vehicular travel with 77% of residents driving to work and 8.5% commuting as passengers. Public transit serves 10.1% of the population, while active options remain modest, with 2.4% walking and 0.8% cycling to their jobs.

=== Public Transport ===
Translink serves bus routes through Shellmont, providing the neighbourhood with direct connections to destinations within Richmond and to neighbouring cities like Delta and Surrey.

=== Cycling ===
Shellmont features a grid of designated bike routes that accommodate local commuting:

- East/West Connections: Williams and the Steveston Highway Multi-use Pathway.
- North/South Connections: Shell Road Trail, Horseshoe Slough Trail.

== Education ==
The Shellmont area is home to two elementary schools:

- Kidd Elementary School
- Kingswood Elementary School
- Woodward Elementary School

As well as one secondary school:

- McNair Secondary School

== Parks and Recreation ==
In addition to school neighbourhood parks, the Shellmont neighbourhood has access to the Shell Road Trail, the Gardens Agricultural Park, Agassiz Neighbourhood Park, Model Airplane Park, Woodwards Landing, Lee Slough, Horseshoe Slough Trail, and the South Dyke Trail. .

The neighbourhood is serviced by the nearby South Arm Community Centre in Broadmoor and Watermania in the Fraser Lands for recreation programming.
