= Minoru 3D Webcam =

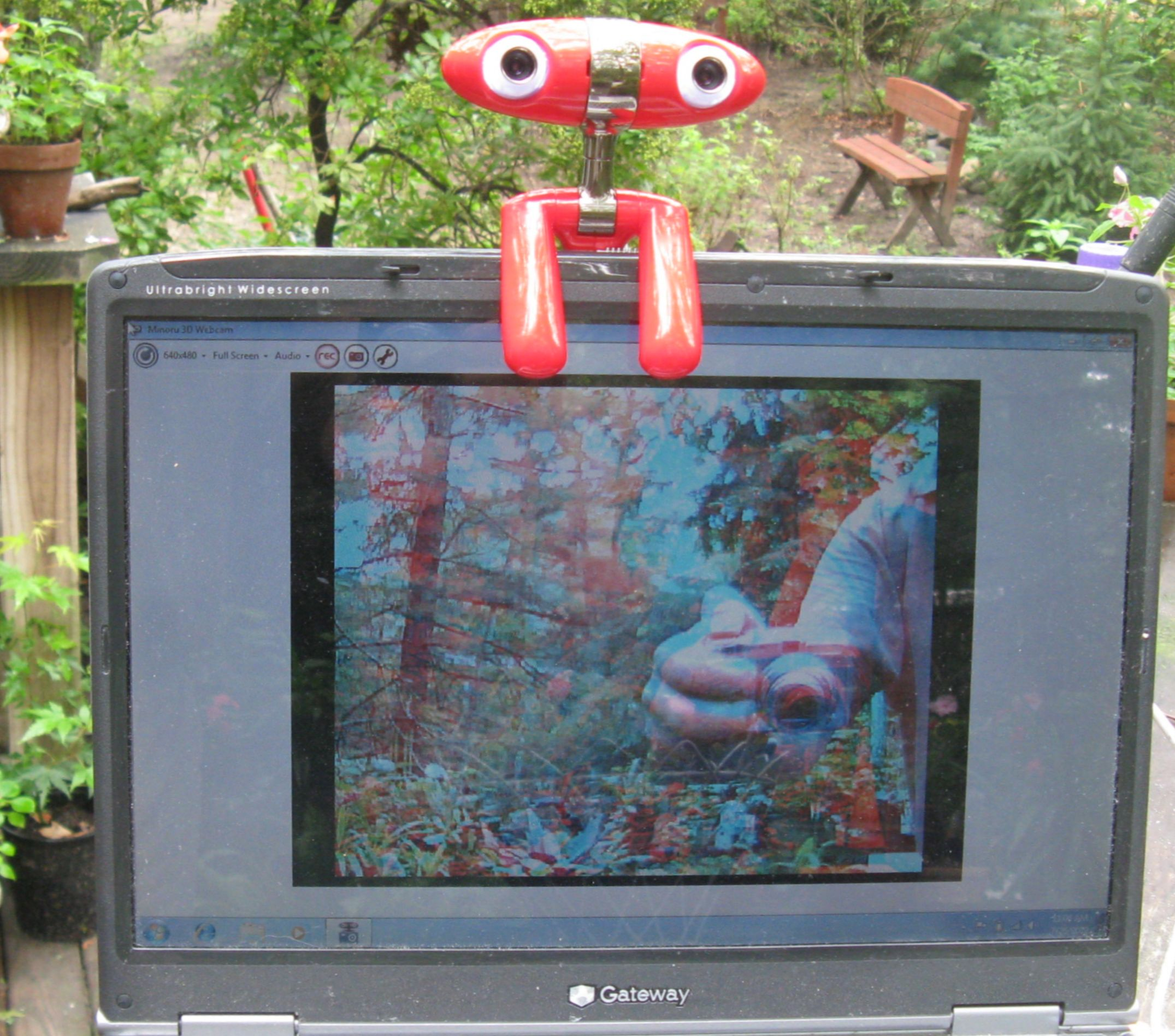
The webcam in action

The Minoru 3D Webcam is a stereoscopic webcam produced by Promotion and Display Technology of Salford, Greater Manchester. Released in January 2009, it won the "Fans' Favorite" award at the Consumer Electronics Show, in Las Vegas. According to the company, it is the "world's first consumer 3D-webcam". It was designed by David Holder.

The webcam, which hooks to a computer via USB port, consists of two cameras, being "roughly the same distance apart as human eyes", that are held together in a device that resembles Wall-E, a Disney character, in appearance. It is capable of 3D, 2D, and Picture-in-picture graphics. Its image can be output from 320x240 pixels to 800x600 pixels, and is capable of 30 frames per second. The 3D imagery can be produced in anaglyph and side by side format.

The camera has two VGA 640x480 CMOS sensors, two high-quality wide-angle lens, and a built in USB microphone.

According to its website, it is most effective when the user is at a minimum of three feet away.

It derives its name from the Japanese given name Minoru, which means "to bear fruit" or "to ripen".
