= Alys McKey Bryant =

American aviator (1880–1954)

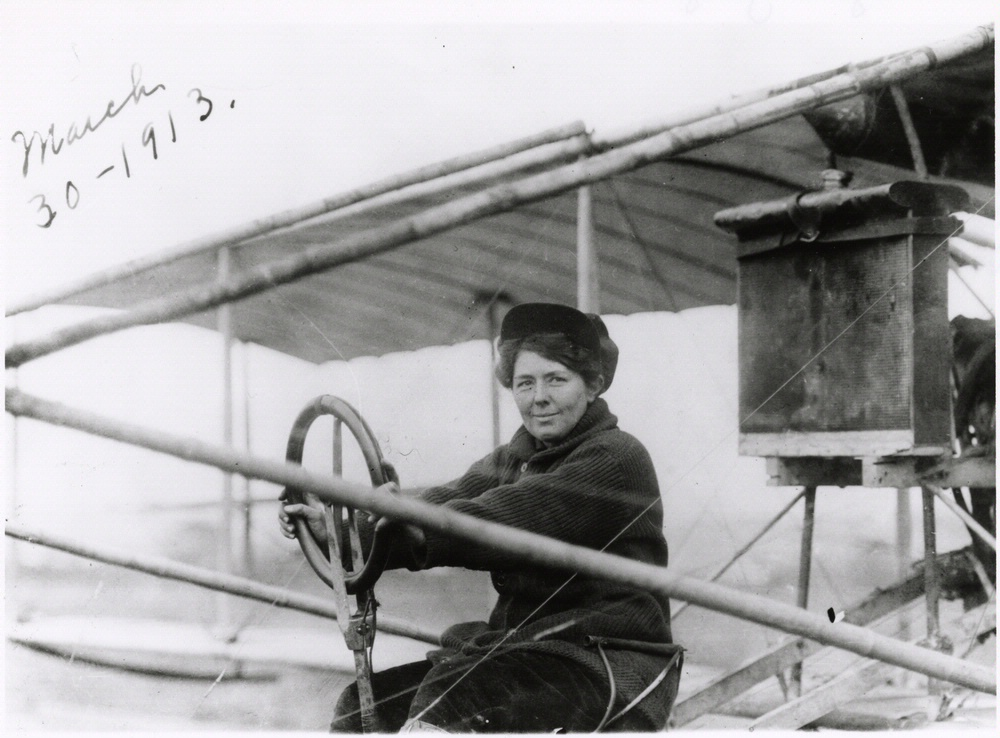
- Born: April 28, 1880; Indiana
- Died: September 6, 1954 (aged 74); Washington, D.C.
- Education: Valparaiso University
- Known for: Record-setting aviator

Alys McKey Bryant (née McKey; 1880–1954) was an American aviator. She was the first woman to fly on the Pacific Coast and in Canada, and one of the few female members of the Early Birds of Aviation—individuals who had solo piloted an aircraft prior to December 17, 1916. She set an altitude record for women, and trained pilots during World War I.

== Early life ==
Bryant was born in rural Indiana on April 28, 1880. She was one of three siblings, raised alone by their father after their mother's early death. Bryant's father taught her mechanics, and as a child, she wrote an essay "describing an imaginary flight across the country... in an electric-powered craft." Bryant later said that she lived on a farm until she was seventeen, breaking in horses. She attended Valparaiso University. By 1911, she had become a home economics teacher in California.

== Career ==
=== Early aviation career ===
Bryant's interest in aviation grew when she witnessed the final stop of pilot Calbraith Perry Rogers's cross-country flight. She began flying in 1912, when she answered a magazine advertisement offering "the ultimate in excitement", posted by Fred Bennett of the Bennett Aero Company of The Palms, California. Bennett's pilot, John Bryant, approved her and signed her on to his exhibition flying team as an airplane pilot. At the time of being signed on, she had never flown before, which was not uncommon during the time. Most pilots had to teach themselves to fly.

Bryant's first paid exhibition flight took place at the Blossom Festival in Yakima, Washington, on May 3, 1913. This achievement was followed by flights at the Portland Rose Festival in Oregon and the Seattle Potlatch. While in Seattle, Bryant also set an altitude record for women, reaching 2,900 feet.

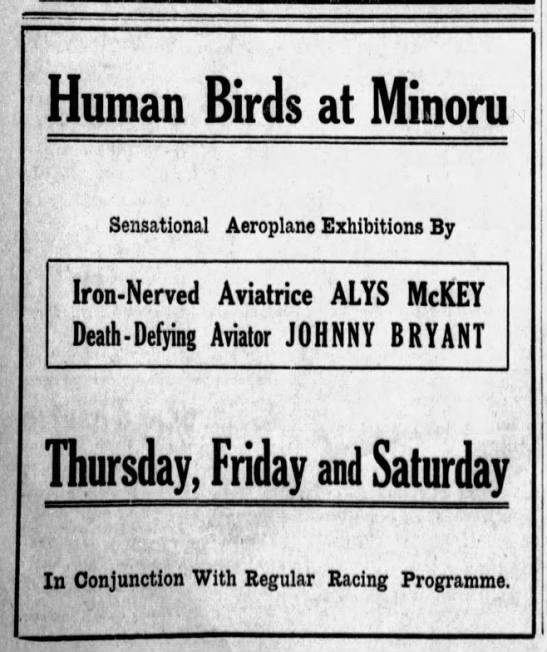
A poster advertising McKey-Bryant's performance.

On a trip to Vancouver, she flew in an exhibition for Edward, Prince of Wales, and his brother George, Duke of York – both future Kings of England. Heading even further north, she became the first woman to fly in Canada on July 31, 1913. Her flight was part of an airshow at Minoru Park in Richmond, British Columbia. A local paper reported that she "delighted the crowd by the clever manner in which she handled the plane [in] dips, rolls, figure eights and other evolutions of a like nature."

On May 29, 1913- the same day she performed in a Boise airshow- Alys married John Bryant. They were called "a blissfully happy and devoted young couple."

=== Death of John Bryant ===
In August 1913, Alys and John Bryant headed to Victoria, British Columbia to perform a series of exhibition flights for $1,000. Leaving in a hurry, they did not thoroughly check their plane for damage. Alys cut her first flight short after ten minutes due to strong winds, stating, "I don't want a ride like that again. It was the roughest, toughest, and most fearsome flight I have so far experienced."

The winds remained dangerously strong the next day, August 6, when John Bryant took to the air. If he had not flown, the Bryants would not have received their fee. Four hundred feet above the city, his plane went into a dive, crashing into the roof of the Lee Dye Building in Victoria's Chinatown. John's neck was broken, and he died soon after first responders reached him. Alys was running towards the site of the crash when Victoria's police chief gave her the news, and collapsed on the spot.

=== Later career and death ===
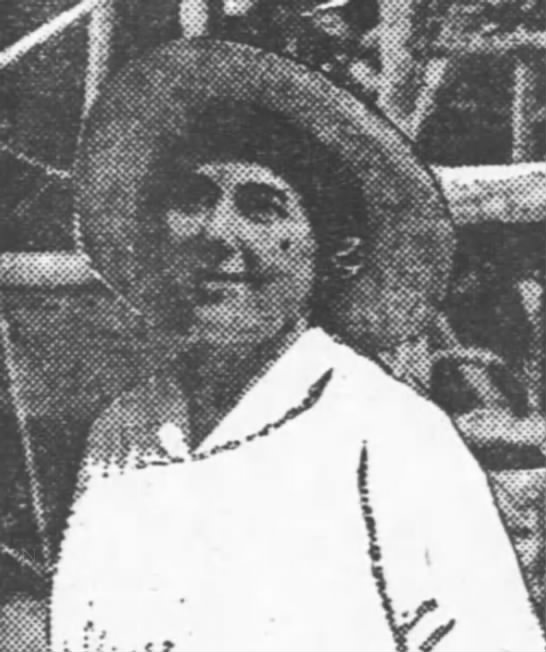
Bryant at the 1914 Seattle Potlatch

The Bennett Aero Company used the Bryants' fee to pay for repairs to the Lee Dye Building, leaving only 300 dollars for Alys Bryant. She traveled to California to bury her husband in the Whittier County Cemetery. After the funeral, she briefly gave up flying. She had returned to aviation by July 1914, when she once again took part in the Seattle Potlatch airshow. There, she expressed her belief that she too would someday be killed in a plane crash, and told the press:

"Some of the happiest moments of my life were spent flying together. He taught me all I know of the aviation game and was always so proud that I knew as much as I did. His confidence helped me to do what I have already done, and the knowledge of it is going to help me this year. When it comes my time to go, I want to go the way that Johnny did. There will be no uncertainty about that sort of a finish. I would prefer that to a minor accident that would leave one helpless, to live, or half live, for years, useless in the world."

By 1917, Bryant had become a deep-sea diver after befriending divers at Harbor Island, Seattle. She dove in both the Atlantic and Pacific oceans, exploring shipwrecks and removing defunct water pipes. Bryant told The Oregon Journal that she was once approached by a shark off the coast of Seattle, but fended it off with an iron rod.

Bryant went to work for Benoist Aircraft in Akron, Ohio, in the spring of 1916. There, she built and prepared airplane parts, assisted aviator Thomas W. Benoist in designing new aircraft, and taught flying lessons. The Marion Star reported that she turned out "six to twelve finished aviators a week."

Bryant boxed to keep in shape and prided herself on leading an athletic life. She enjoyed outdoor sports and motorcycling.

Bryant died on September 6, 1954. She was seventy-four years old.
