= Minoru Park =

Park in Richmond, British Columbia, Canada

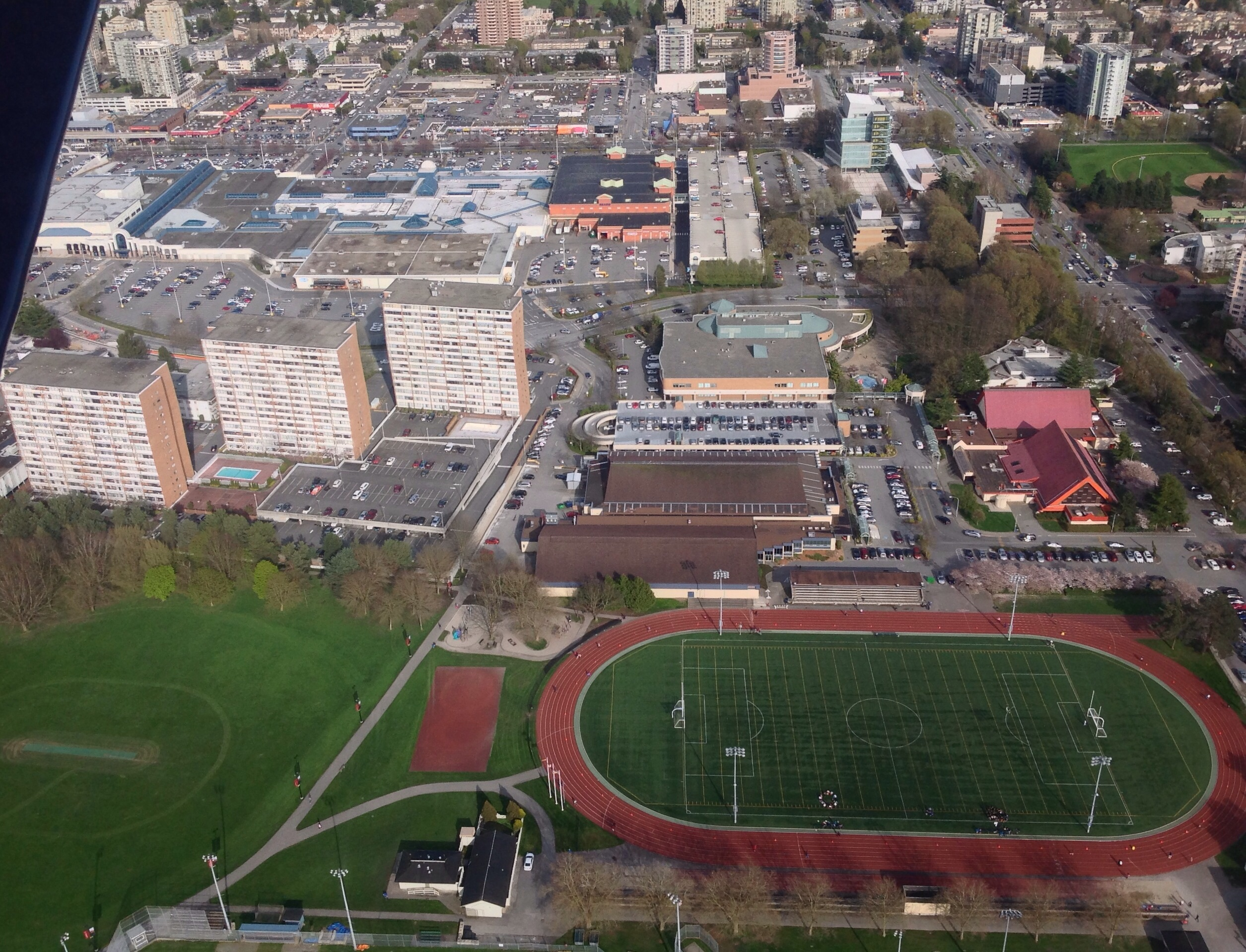
- East-facing aerial view of Minoru Park

- Location within Greater Vancouver Regional District
- Type: Urban park
- Location: Richmond, British Columbia
- Coordinates: 49°09′56″N 123°08′43″W
- Area: 45 acres (18 ha)
- Opened: 1907
- Owner: City of Richmond
- Operator: City of Richmond
- Status: Open
- Designation: No
- Parking: Yes
- Public transit: Richmond-Brighouse

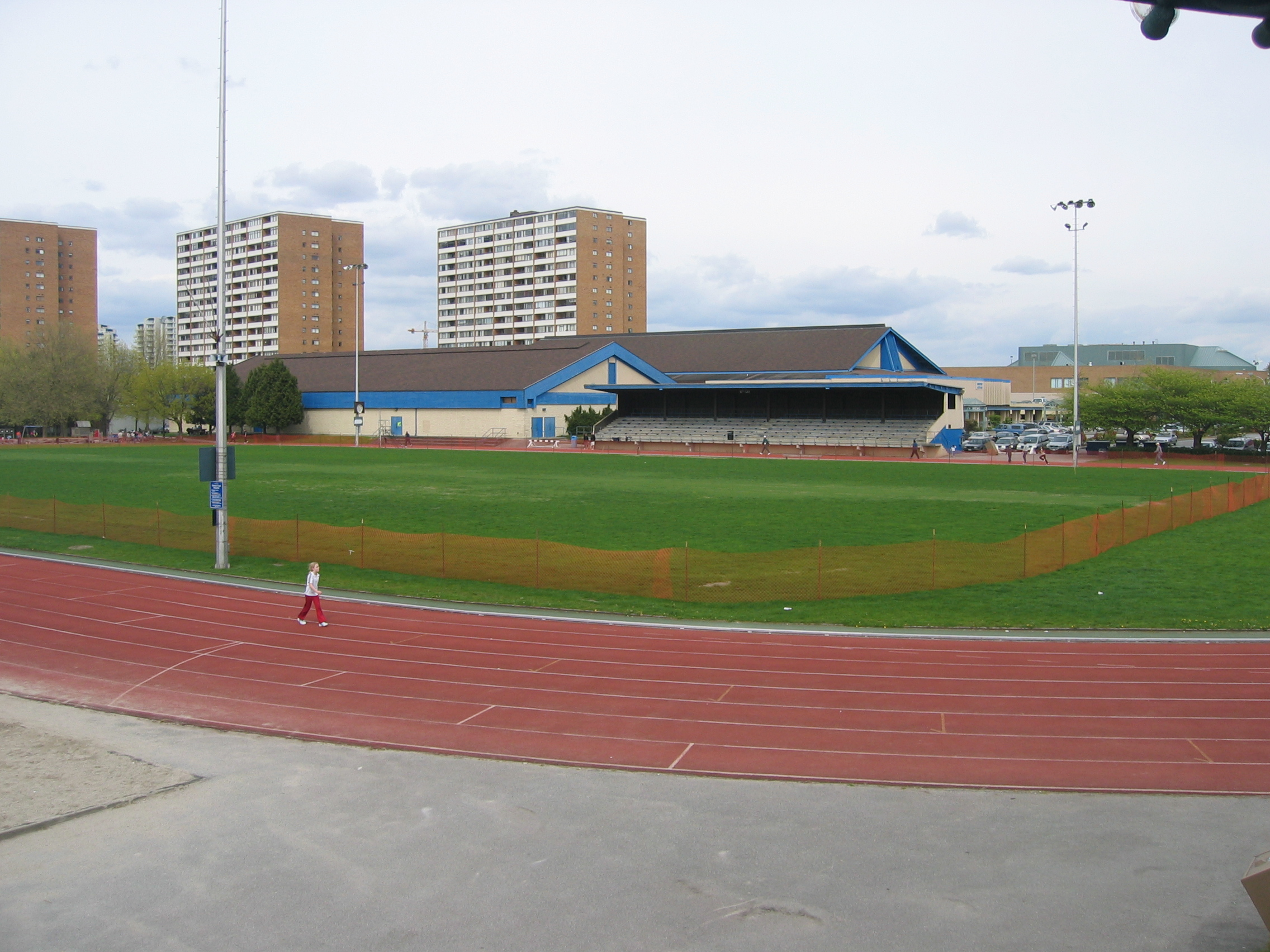
Minoru Park's running track, built on its former horse racecourse

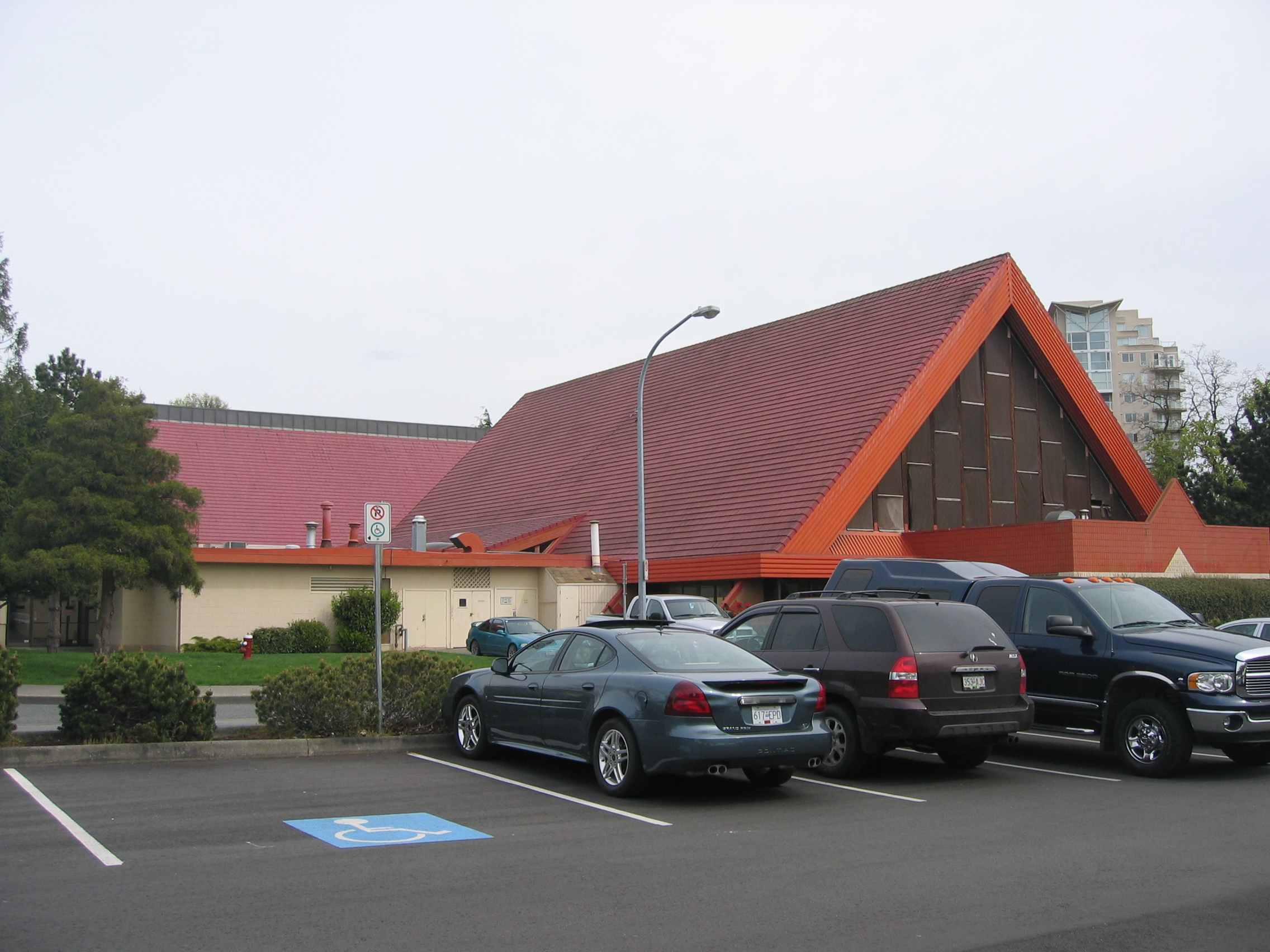
Minoru Aquatic Centre

Minoru Park is a park located on the site of a former horse-racing track and airstrip in Richmond, British Columbia.

The park's running track is often used by School District 38 Richmond for school competitions, such as track and field. The area is home to the Minoru Arenas, Minoru Track, Minoru Aquatic Centre and Richmond Cultural Centre (which in turn houses the Richmond Public Library's main branch, City of Richmond Archives, Richmond Art Gallery and Richmond Museum). All these facilities account for the bulk of community services offered by the city.

Minoru was one of the first major aviation hubs in Western Canada.

== History ==
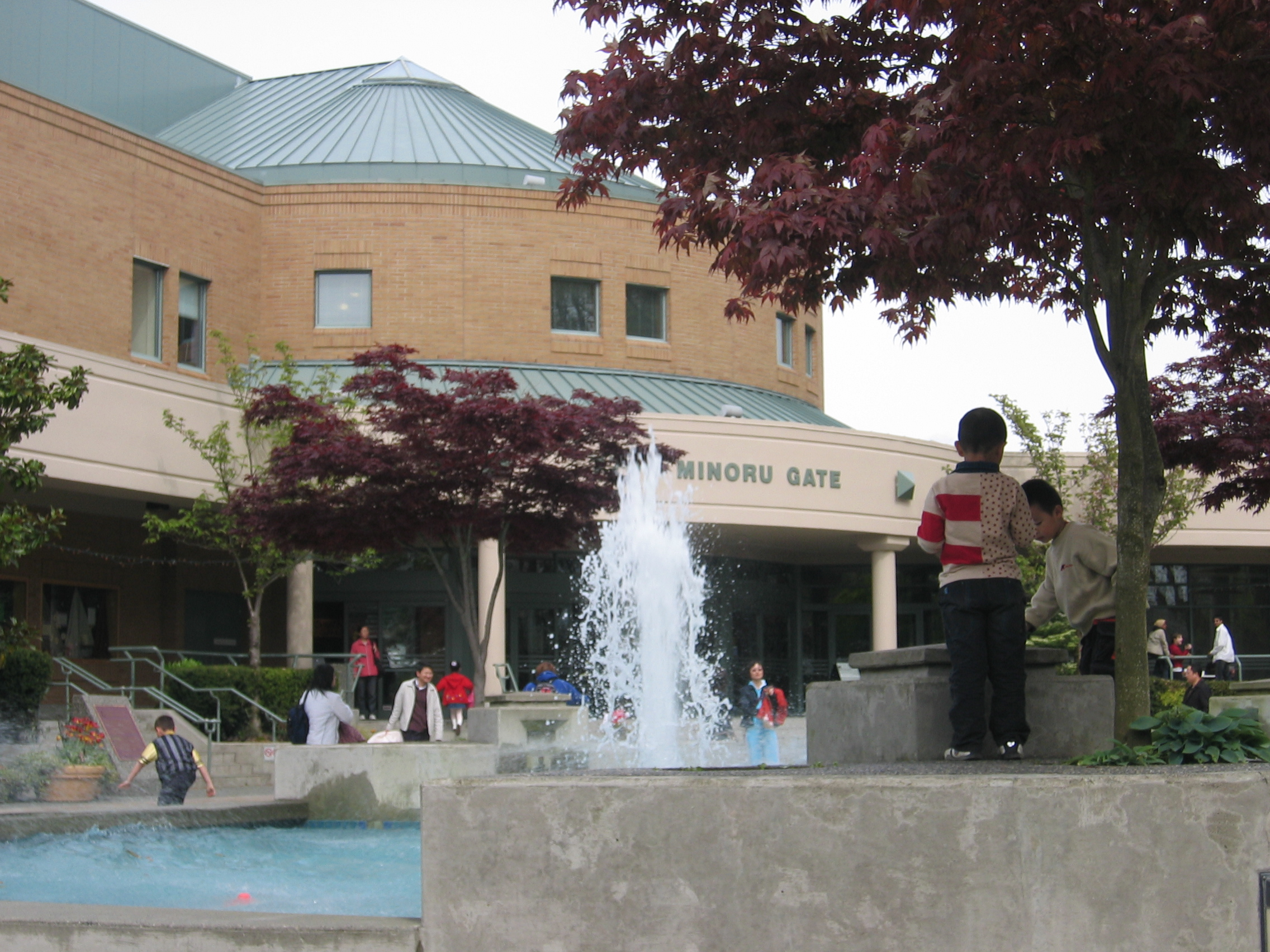
Richmond Cultural Centre

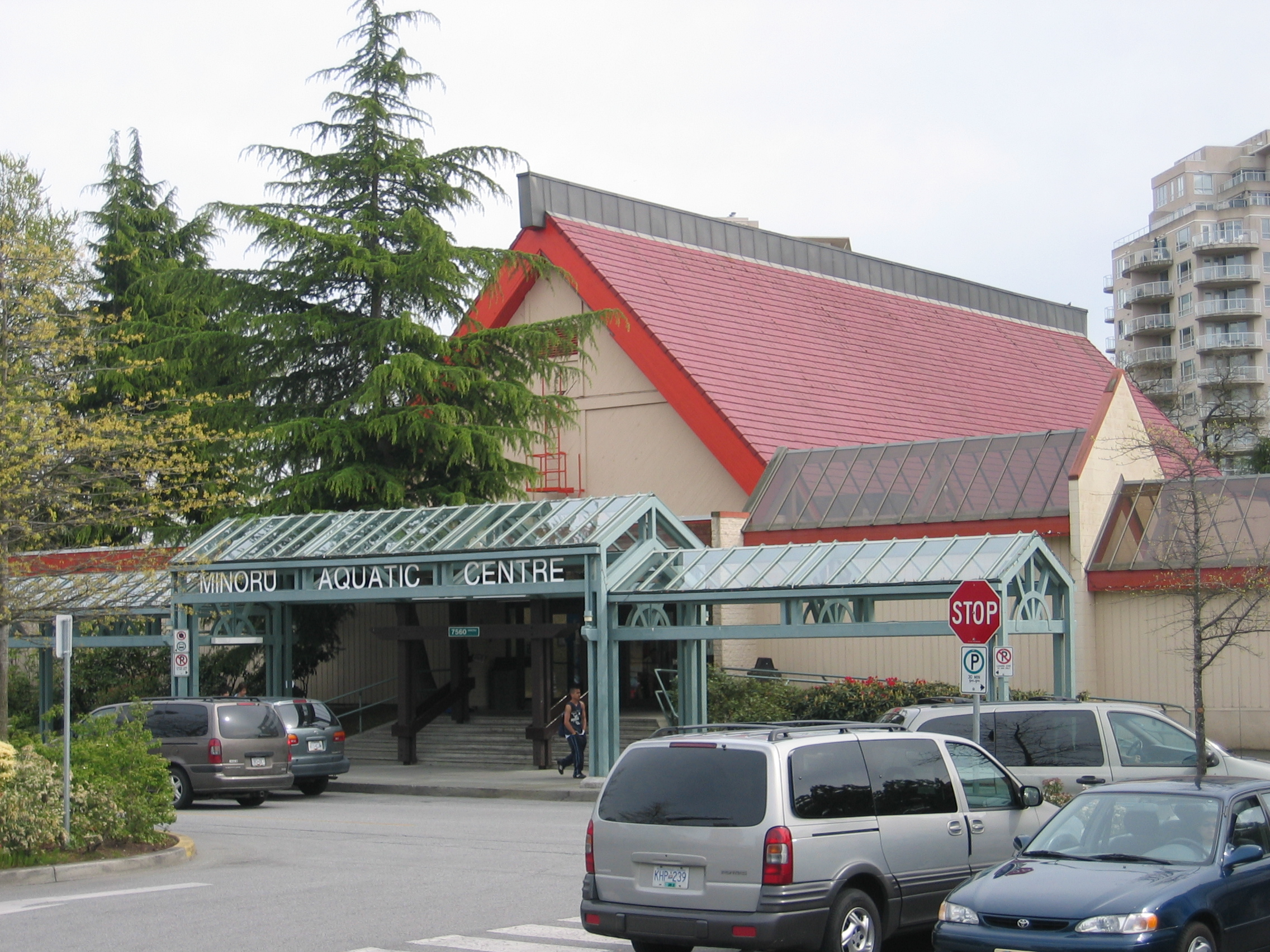
Minoru Aquatic Centre's main entrance

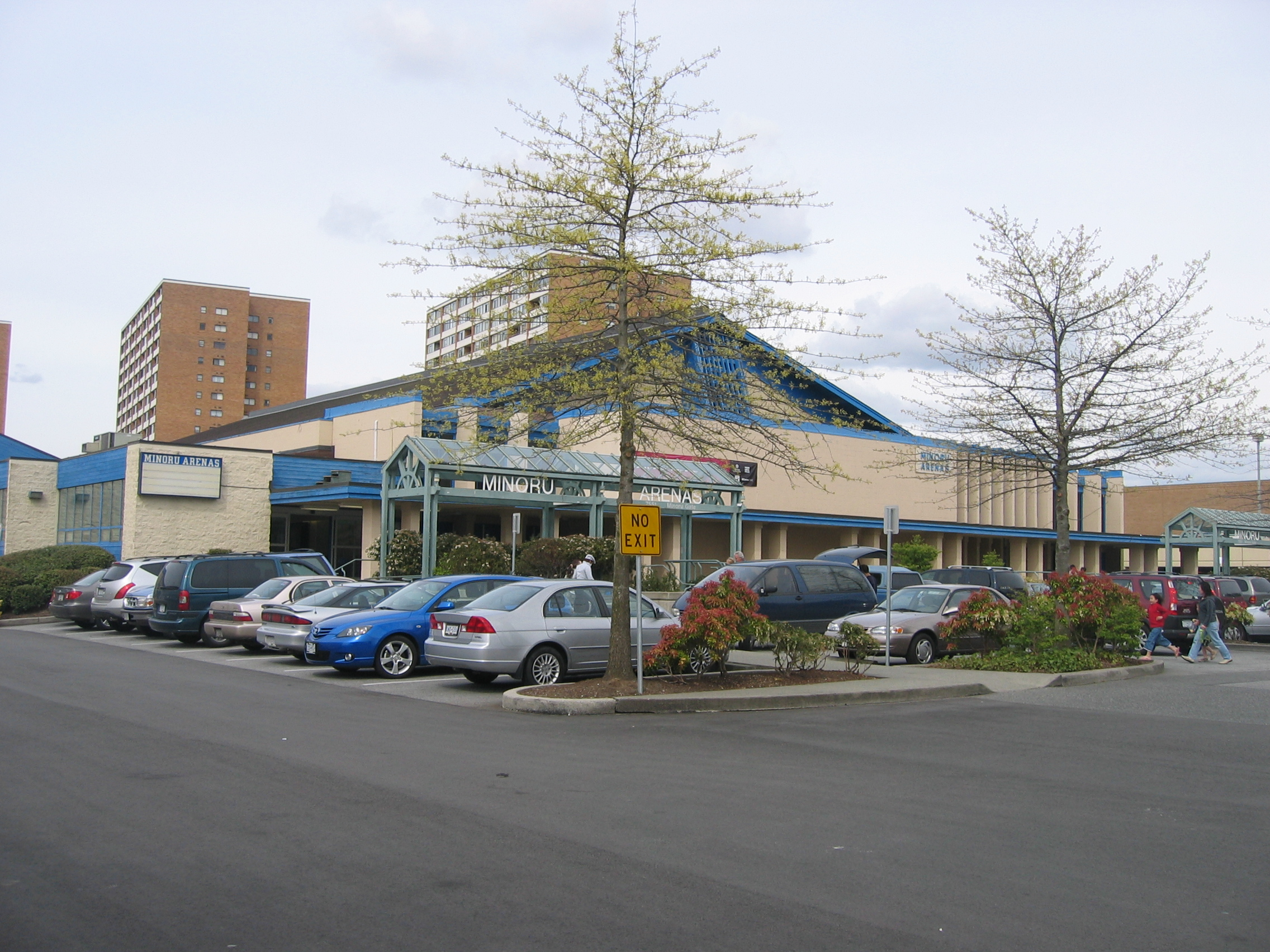
Minoru Arenas' main entrance

Named after King Edward VII's Epsom Derby-winning Irish thoroughbred racehorse, Minoru, the area started out as a horse-racing track on August 21, 1909, to an audience of 7,000. (Minoru never raced in Richmond, however.)

Almost one year later, on March 25, 1910, the first-ever Canadian airplane flight west of Winnipeg took off from Minoru Racetrack, with 3,500 witnesses on hand. The plane was manned by Charles K. Hamilton; he flew it from Minoru to New Westminster and back. This event is often credited for the Vancouver International Airport being located in Richmond rather than another municipality in Metro Vancouver.

Another year later, on April 28, 1911, William Templeton flew a homemade biplane at Minoru. This was the first plane to be both built in and flown over Metro Vancouver. Templeton would later become the first manager of Vancouver International Airport.

On May 24, 1912, the first parachute jump in Canada was made in Minoru Park by Charles Saunders.

American Alys McKey Bryant became the first woman in Canada to make a solo flight, taking off from Minoru Park on July 31, 1913.

In early August 1919, the first-ever flight in Canada to cross the Rocky Mountains took off from Minoru Park. It was manned by Vancouver's Ernest Charles Hoy, who flew the plane from Richmond to Calgary. The trip took 16 hours and 42 minutes. It was also the first airmail delivery across the Rocky Mountains.

Minoru Park, which was shut down during the First World War, re-opened in 1920 as Brighouse Park, named after Richmond and Vancouver pioneer and farmer Samuel Brighouse.

One of the more interesting incidents that took place at Minoru Park involves Vancouver's most frequently elected mayor, L. D. Taylor. In 1928, he was on board the first flight from Victoria to Metro Vancouver. The plane landed at Minoru Park, and a crowd was waiting there because of Taylor's appearance. Taylor stepped out of the plane and as he was walking towards the crowd, he was struck by the plane's propeller. He suffered a fractured skull, but was up and about only weeks later. A local aviation pioneer commented, "It sliced off the top of his head, you know, and knocked him unconscious. They said if he'd had an ounce more brains he'd have been a dead man."

Richmond and Lulu Island's first-ever church, Minoru Chapel, originally built in 1891, was also moved and rebuilt at Minoru Park in 1967, and later designated a heritage building. In 1968, it was converted to an interdenominational chapel housing mainly weddings and funerals; it remains in this state today.

== Present-day Minoru Park ==
Today, Minoru Park is home to the city's cultural and community services:

=== Richmond Library and Cultural Centre ===
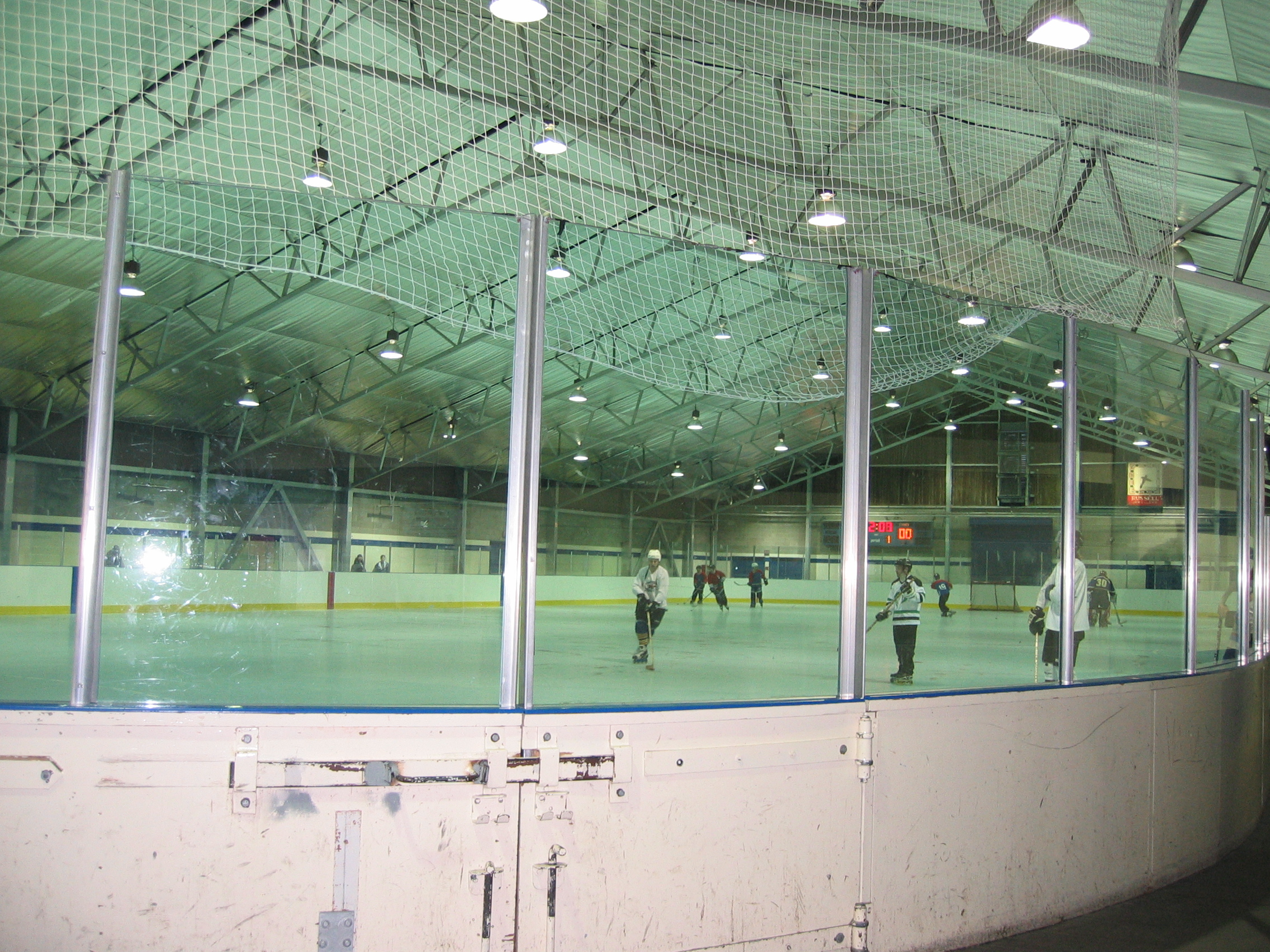
Minoru Arenas' general-purpose rink

The Richmond Library and Cultural Centre is home to the City of Richmond Archives, Richmond Museum, Richmond Art Gallery, Richmond Arts Centre and Media Lab, and the Brighouse branch of the Richmond Public Library. It also hosts arts and crafts clubs on the second floor, as well as other community societies.

=== Minoru Aquatic Centre ===
The Minoru Aquatic Centre houses two lap pools — Minoru (25 metres) and Centennial (30 metres) — and one teach/kids pool. The facility houses a small weight room, a co-ed sauna and two hot tubs. Most of the swimming lessons offered by the city take place here, as well as the water-based first aid training for residents. Swim competitions no longer take place here since Watermania Aquatic Centre was completed. In addition, some films and TV shows shoot some of their scenes here (for example, the Smallville episode "Cool").

Swimming lessons offered include the Canadian Red Cross's Red Cross Swim Kids program (levels 1 to 10) and the Royal Life Saving Society of Canada's Bronze program (Bronze Medallion and Bronze Cross).

=== Minoru Arenas ===
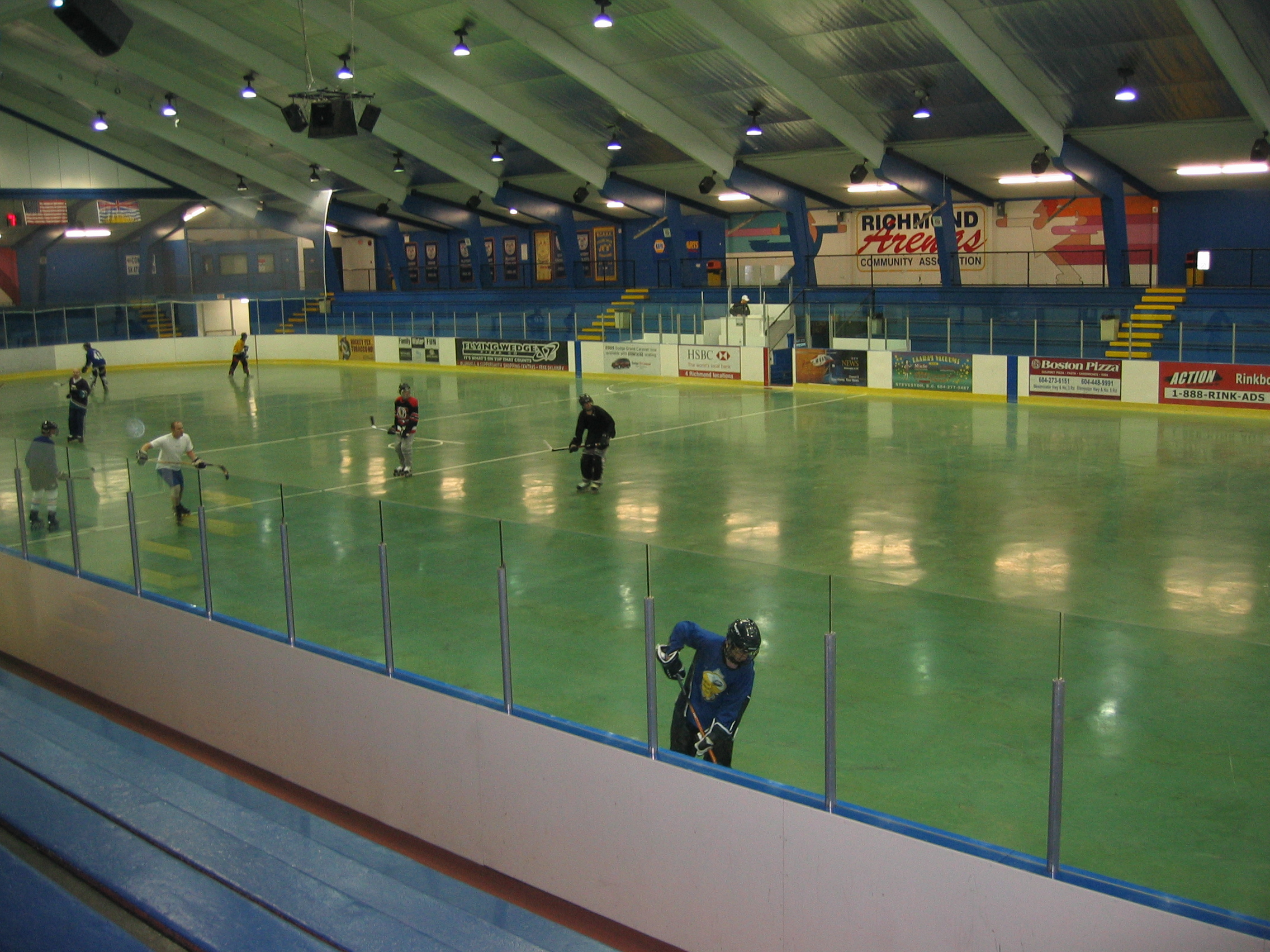
Minoru Arenas' stadium rink

Minoru Arenas is home to Richmond's junior league team, the Richmond Sockeyes. The building houses two skating rinks: one for general skates and hockey practices, and the other for hockey games and tournaments, complete with spectator stands. Annually during Christmas time, the latter is decorated in a "Christmas Wonderland" theme, and free skating time is offered in exchange for a donation to the food bank.

In 1996 the arena hosted the IIHL Women's Pacific Rim Championship.

In November 2006, the UBC Thunderbirds hockey team from the University of British Columbia moved to Minoru Arenas, using it as one of their temporary home arenas while their new stadium, the UBC Winter Sports Centre, was being constructed.

=== Latrace Field ===
Located in Minoru Park, Latrace Field was home to many baseball teams including the Richmond AutoBody Budgies Senior Men's Baseball Club, as well as the Lower Mainland Baseball League. It is now home to the Delta Blue Jays (BCPBL), The Richmond Chuckers (A, AA, AAA), The Richmond Athletics, The Richmond Rainiers and The Richmond Redsox (LMBA).

=== Clement Track ===
Clement Track (formally Minoru Track, renamed after Doug and Diane Clement, local track and field people) was built on the site of the former horse-racing track. Today, it is home of the Kajaks Track & Field Club established in 1961. Clement Track is used mostly for running competitions and for general recreational use. There are two school events annually: the Richmond School District's Track and Field Meets taking place throughout the month of May, where schools from the school district (SD38) come to compete, and the BC Elementary Track & Field Championship hosted by Kajaks TFC where athletes age 9-13 compete over a three day festival track & field meet. The length of the Minoru Track is 400 metres.

=== Minoru Park ===
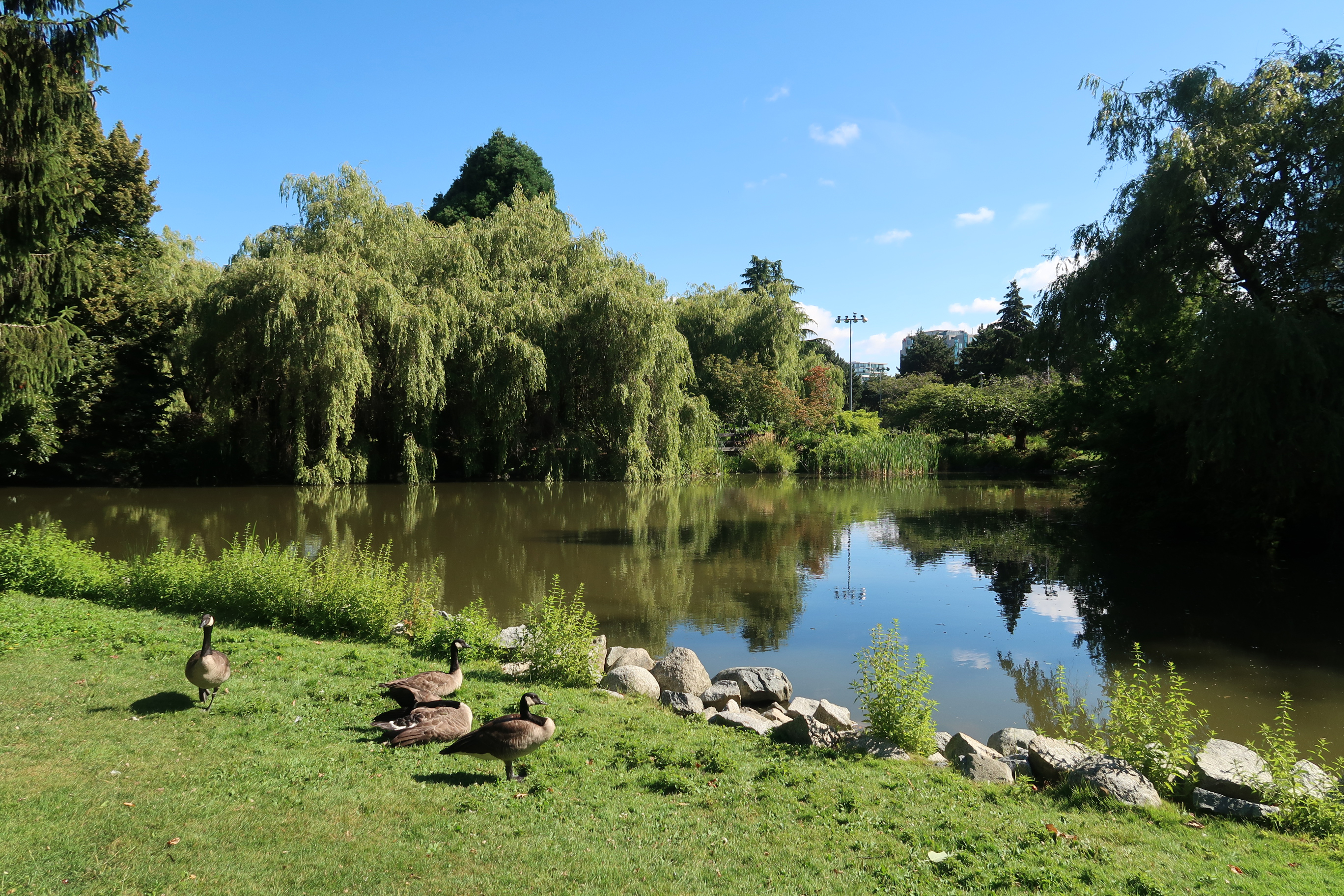
Minoru Park's Pond

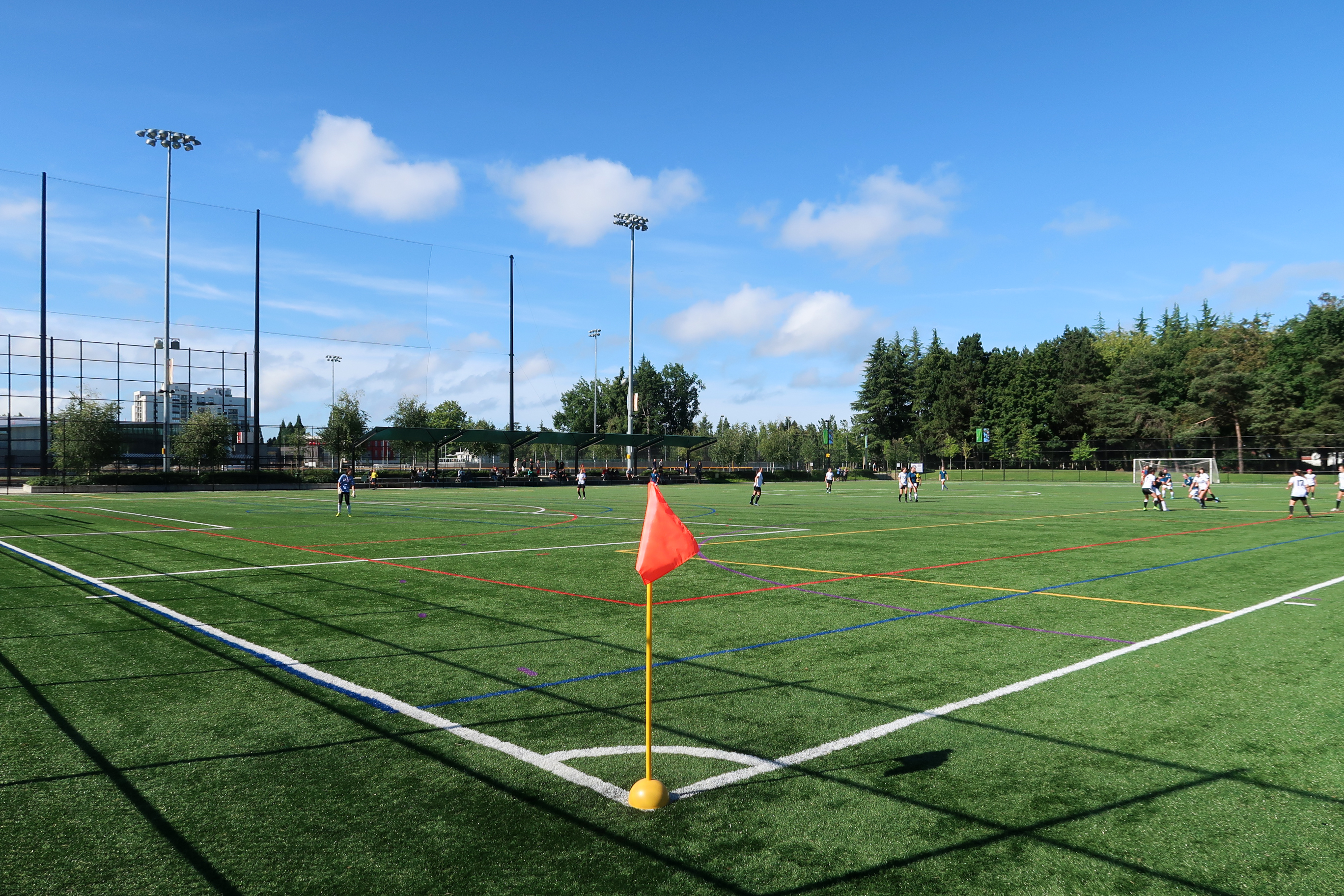
Minoru Park's Latrace Field

The rest of the park features a park, some soccer fields and several outdoor tennis courts. Some of the former park land has been developed for low-income housing and condominiums. The Richmond Rugby Football Club also plays here and has been active in Richmond for over 50 years.

== Geography ==
Minoru Park's approximate road boundaries are Gilbert Road to the west, Westminster Highway to the north, Minoru Boulevard to the east and Granville Avenue to the south.

The Minoru Park area is surrounded by other Richmond landmarks. To its east is Richmond Centre, the city's largest mall. The southeast part of the part is close to the Richmond City Hall. To its west is the Richmond Hospital, the main hospital of the city, and Gateway Theatre, which houses most of the city's performing arts productions and clubs.

The provincial headquarters of WorkSafeBC, the workers' compensation board, is located to Minoru's northwest. The main hall of the Richmond Fire Department is located near the park's southwest part. Richmond's main Royal Canadian Mounted Police detachment was located across from the Richmond Cultural Centre, on Minoru's east side but has since moved.

== Transportation ==
Minoru is easily accessible from Vancouver International Airport, via the Dinsmore Bridge.

It can also be reached via public transit due to its proximity to Richmond Centre, which is the central point for most transit routes in the city, including the Canada Line.

== New construction ==
Minoru Park is undergoing construction starting from April 2014. It added an artificial soccer field, a multi-purpose turf field, and a multi-purpose facility for aquatics and sports for older adults. The project was designed by the Richmond Sports Council, and the purpose is to replace the aging and inadequate facilities that no longer satisfied the community.

The opening of the pool facility was intended for to be 2019, however, the project was delayed due to a crack in the base of one of the pools. However, the seniors and events center opened later. At the end of 2021 the aquatic center finally opened.

Track and field throwing events, the cricket pitch, the tennis courts and one of the two existing turf fields have been relocated. Several trees near the Regency Park Towers have been cut down to make sure there is sufficient space. However, in new landscaping they will be replaced at a ratio of 3:1. There are also several paths in the park that are blocked due to construction.

Plans to tear down Minoru Pavilion are currently suspended.

The plan also includes new paths for park visitors and an expanded parking lot.
