= Richmond Public Library (Canada) =

Public library system in British Columbia

Coordinates: 49°09′50″N 123°08′28″W

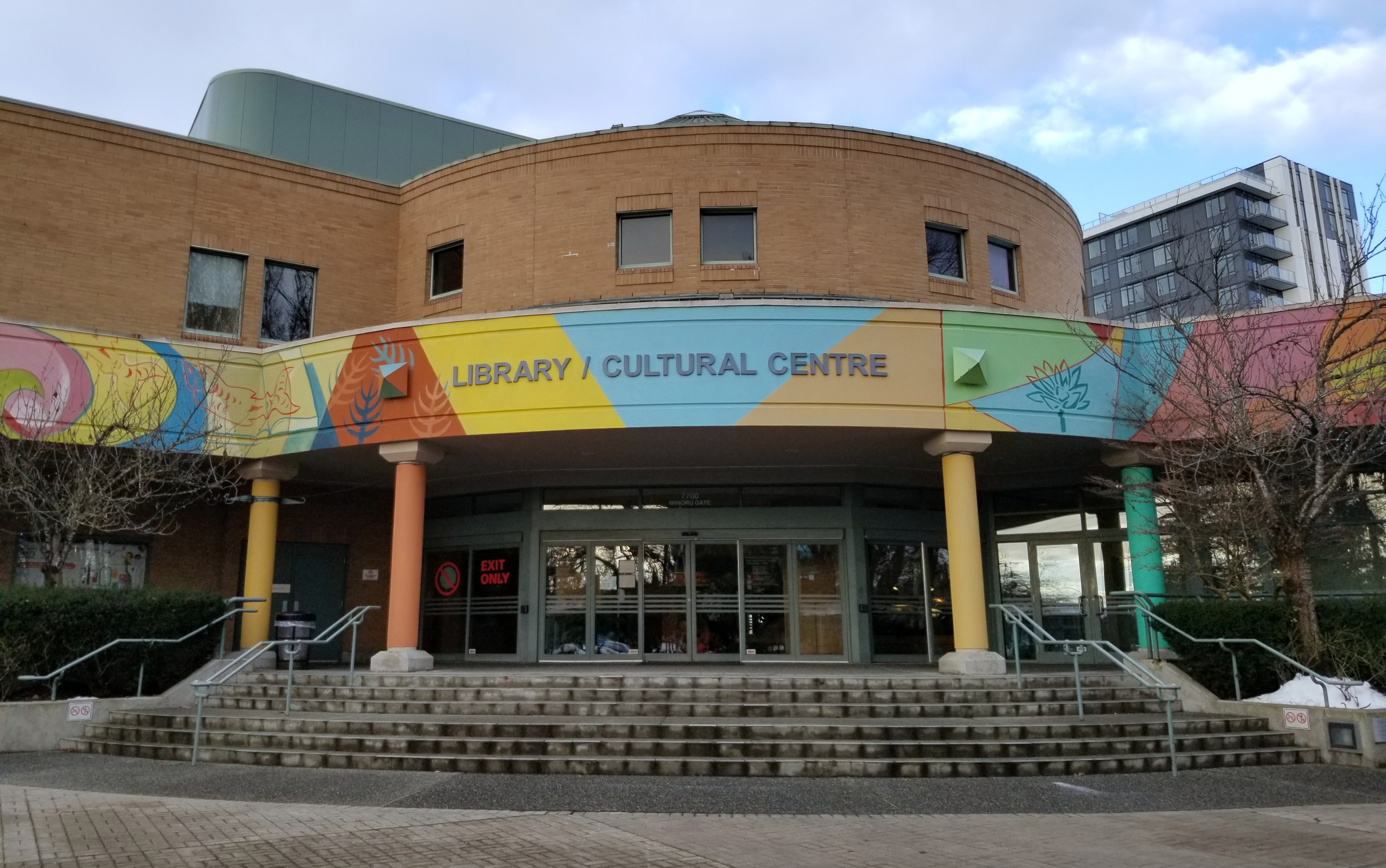
- Entrance to the Richmond Cultural Centre, which houses the Brighouse branch
- Type: Public library
- Established: 1975
- Service area: Richmond, British Columbia
- Branches: 4

Collection
- Items collected: books, e-books, cds, periodicals, local history, movies, TV shows, video games, board games
- Size: 530,439 (2025)

Access and use
- Circulation: 2,996,075 (2025)
- Population served: 229,781 (2023)
- Members: 108,332 (2019)

Other information
- Budget: CA$11,941,830 (2025)
- Chief Librarian: Susan Walters
- Board Chair: Denise Hui
- Employees: 138
- Affiliation: Public Library InterLINK Federation
- Website: www.yourlibrary.ca

Richmond Public Library (RPL) is the public library system in Richmond, British Columbia. In 2025, RPL had more than 1.1 million visits across four branches, with patrons borrowing nearly 3 million items including books, e-books, video games, magazines, and newspapers.

== History ==
The Richmond Public Library's former logo, used until 2026

In 1976, the Richmond Municipal Council officially approved the establishment of the Richmond Public Library as an independent entity, separating from the Fraser Valley Regional Library (FVRL) network.

In 1979, the city council, led by Mayor Gil Blair, approved a $1 million allocation to expand the Brighouse Centre Library. This investment was Richmond’s 1979 Centennial Project, celebrating the 100th anniversary of the city's incorporation.

The Brighouse branch reopened in 1993 after being rebuilt as part of the Richmond Cultural Centre.

In December 1998, the RPL opened its Ironwood Branch in the Shellmont neighbourhood. In 2001, the new branch received international attention for its efficiency and design, which was based on the layouts of bookstores like Chapters and Indigo.

In February 2021, Richmond Public Library permanently eliminated late fines to reduce barriers to accessing library services.

== Branches ==
The Richmond Public Library system consists of four physical locations across the city:

=== Brighouse Branch ===
Located within the Richmond Cultural Centre precinct at Minoru Gate, Brighouse serves as the system's main reference and administrative headquarters. It houses the system's digital creation stations, expansive multilingual resources, and specialized research archives.

==== Special Collection on Chinese Culture (中華古今文獻精藏) ====
The second floor of the Brighouse branch houses a collection dedicated to Chinese art, culture, and history. The collection was founded in 2011 following a donation of 47,000 books by Richmond resident Dr. Kwok-Chu Lee (Master Lam Chun). The collection contains over 17,000 volumes, including a Chinese Art Collection of more than 5,200 works.

=== Steveston Branch ===
Located in the city's historic maritime village, the Steveston branch was the first library in Richmond, opening in 1955. In December 2025, the Steveston branch was closed while a new building was constructed to replace the original 1957 community centre. The new location is part of the 60,000 sq-ft Steveston Community Centre and Library complex, and will feature larger collections as well as more spaces for educational programming and silent study. During the construction, the library operated out of a temporary location in the area.

=== Ironwood Branch ===
Located at Ironwood Plaza (No. 5 Road and Steveston Highway), this branch serves the Shellmont neighbourhood and the surrounding communities.

=== Cambie Branch ===
Located on Cambie Road, the branch serves East Richmond (including the West Cambie and East Cambie neighbourhoods). The branch also works with the Friends of the Richmond Library, a grassroots volunteer organization that operates a used bookstore nearby.

=== Book dispensers ===
In September 2018, Richmond Public Library launched a book dispensing machine in the Hamilton Community Centre, allowing residents to access the library's collection. A second machine was installed in the Minoru Centre for Active Living in February 2020.

== Services ==
The Richmond Public Library offers a variety of services, such as:

- Books, DVDs, magazines, video games in a variety of languages for children and adults
- E-books and audio books offered through Libby, a free app on iOS and Android by OverDrive, Inc.
- Birdwatching, Fishing, and Hiking ExplorePACKS
- Ukuleles, STEAM Kits, Podcasting kits, and Indigenous resource kits.
- Computer and Internet Workstations
- Silent study rooms
- Small bookable spaces for meetings
- Various programs for children and adults, including storytimes, ESL conversation circles, cultural festivals and presentations on a wide variety of topics.

=== The Launchpad ===
In 2014 the RPL opened the Launchpad, a makerspace in the Brighouse branch that provides access to 3D printers, Cricut machines, digitization stations, and scanners. Library users can submit files for 3D printing after completion of an online certification, with charges for material and printing time applied to their accounts. 3D printing is also available at the Ironwood Branch, and Cricut machines can also be found at the Ironwood and Steveston branches.
