= Minoru Chapel =

Chapel in Richmond, British Columbia, Canada

Coordinates: 49°10′02″N 123°08′46″W

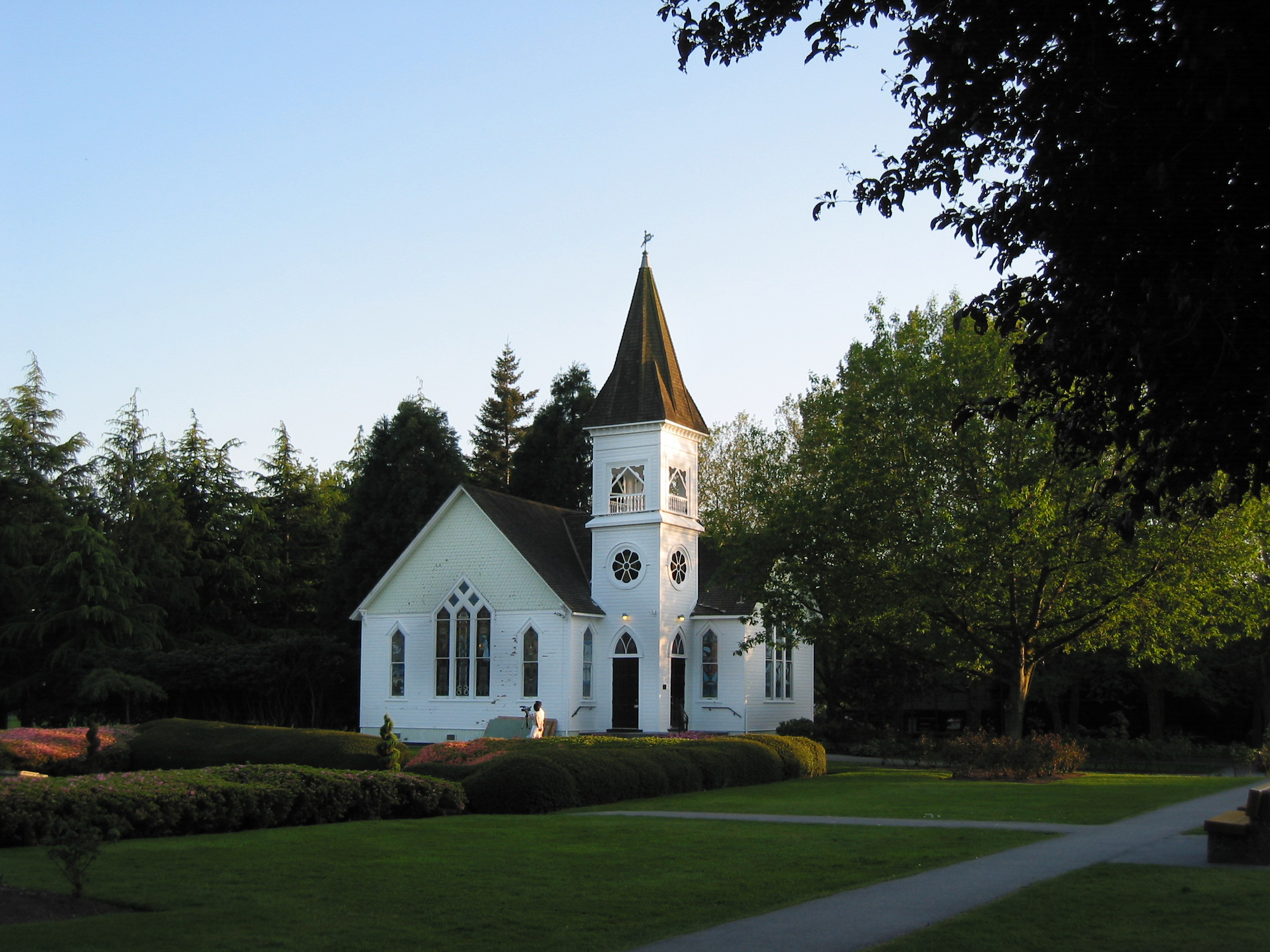
Minoru Chapel

Minoru Chapel is a small white wooden chapel that is now located in Richmond, British Columbia's Minoru Park. The chapel was built in 1891 on the corner of River Road and Cambie Road from plan 109 supplied by the Methodist Board of Church Extension and was run by the Methodist Church, and later by the United Church.

It was constructed by the Fraser River so it could easily be reached by boat (at the time Richmond had few roads). Minoru Chapel was renovated and moved to the park in 1967. The chapel's convenient location and historical charm make it a popular place to get married, with up to eight weddings taking place a day throughout the summer months.
