= Franz von Rintelen =

German spy

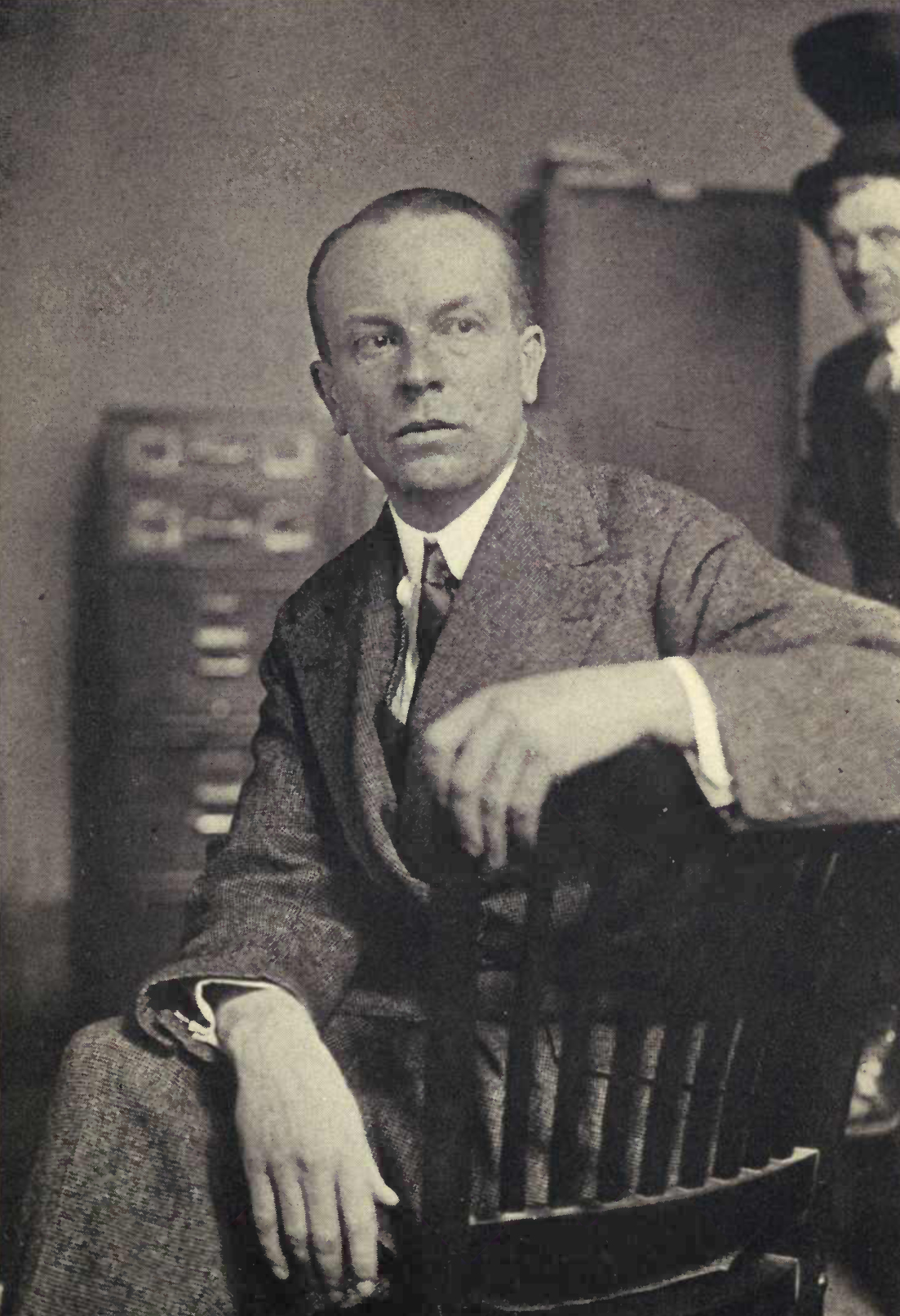
- Born: 19 August 1878; Frankfurt (Oder), Province of Brandenburg, Kingdom of Prussia, German Empire
- Died: 30 May 1949 (aged 70); London, England
- Citizenship: Prussian
- Known for: German spy ring in the US during WWI; Black Tom explosion
- Criminal charge: Espionage
- Criminal penalty: Three years
- Criminal status: Convicted
- Espionage activity
- Allegiance: German Empire
- Agency: Nachrichten-Abteilung
- Service years: 1914-1918
- Rank: Captain
- Codename: Emil V. Gasche; Frederick Hansen
- Operations: Black Tom Explosion

Captain Franz Dagobert Johannes von Rintelen (19 August 1878 – 30 May 1949) was a member of the German nobility and a veteran field agent in the intelligence wing of the German Imperial Navy who operated covertly in the still-neutral United States during World War I.

== Biography ==
Captain von Rintelen came from a banking family with good connections in American banking since he had served with Deutsche Bank as well as acting as U.S. representative for Disconto-Gesellschaft, then Germany's second-largest bank, beginning in 1906. He also spoke excellent English.

He was sent by his superiors in the Nachrichten-Abteilung, the military intelligence arm of the German Imperial Admiralty Staff, to the still neutral United States in 1915, at age 38, on a false Swiss passport under the name of Emil V. Gasche (the surname appropriated from his brother-in-law).

Arriving on 3 April 1915, Captain von Rintelen operated independently of the spymasters under German Foreign Office cover. He received both his funds and orders directly from the Admiralty in Berlin. His mission was to prevent American corporations from selling or shipping military supplies to the Allies by any means necessary. Arriving in New York City, he posed as businessman Frederick Hansen and with Heinrich Albert, who from 1914–17, served as Handelsattaché (commercial attaché) at the German embassy in Washington D.C. set up a dummy corporation called Bridgeport Projectile Company, through which they made large purchases of gunpowder, which was then destroyed. The goal was to create shortages and drive up the price of smokeless powder, which would further disrupt Allied purchases of munitions. With the covert financial backing of the Austro-Hungarian Evidenzbureau, Captain von Rintelen also set up another shell company, Transatlantic Trust Company at 57 William Street in Manhattan, into which he deposited a large sum of money on his arrival from Germany. He also attempted a hostile takeover of the du Pont Chemical Company, but without success.

Captain von Rintelen worked with a chemist, Dr. Walter Scheele, to develop time-delayed incendiary devices known as cigar bombs, which were then placed in the holds of munitions ships to cause fires in the ships' holds. Several were planted successfully. Captain von Rintelen and his agents would slip the bombs onto ships carrying munitions bound for the Allies. The incendiary device ignited cargos when ships were far at sea. It was estimated later that they had successfully destroyed $10 million (USD $214 million in 2025) worth of war materiel on 36 ships.

When the longshoremen recruited by Captain von Rintelen also attempted to plant bombs on the passenger mail boat Ancona, the Captain turned his attentions to different types of supporters.

He also organized the Labor's National Peace Council to finance labor unions, foster strike action and work stoppages among munitions factories, and further disrupt shipments of war materiel to the Allies. From his offices at 55 Liberty Street in New York City (around the corner from Transatlantic Trust, where he was known as Hansen), he spent US$500,000 doing so, most of which went to his U.S. agent, David Lamar, known as the "Wolf of Wall Street". Lamar's reports of success were exaggerated.

During 1915, he negotiated with Victoriano Huerta for money to purchase weapons and U-boat landings to provide support, as Germany was hoping to persuade Mexico to make war on the U.S. through the Plan of San Diego, as this would divert the United States military and all munitions supplies towards defending America's southern border. Their meetings, held at the Manhattan Hotel (as well as another New York hotel, "probably the Holland House" at Fifth Avenue and 30th Street) were observed by agents of the U.S. Secret Service, and von Rintelen's telephone conversations were bugged and recorded. It is also very likely that Room 40 of the British Naval Intelligence Division, which could read at least two of the ciphers he used, was also observing Captain von Rintelen's activities.

His work was largely successful and he probably played some role in planning the Black Tom explosion of 1916. Also in 1915 he bought ammunition and supplied money to the deposed Mexican dictator Huerta and encouraged him to try to seize back power in Mexico.

Other German spymasters under diplomatic cover in America were not all pleased with the Captain's activities. German Foreign Office Military Attaché and fellow field agent Franz von Papen (the future Chancellor of the Weimar Republic) sent a telegram to Berlin complaining about Captain von Rintelen and may have revealed that his cover was blown. The telegram was intercepted and decrypted by Room 40. In response, Captain von Rintelen received a telegram summoning him to Berlin from the German Imperial Admiralty Staff (in a cypher Room 40 could read; it remains unclear if Room 40 forged the telegram, or merely intercepted it). Captain von Rintelen sailed back to Germany on 3 August, on the neutral Holland America liner Noordam. After the liner was diverted to the United Kingdom he was arrested at Southampton, but protested his innocence so skillfully that the Swiss Embassy and Scotland Yard were both persuaded. During a further meeting, the head of Room 40, Admiral W. R. "Blinker" Hall, was not, and Captain von Rintelen cracked under interrogation and confessed; he was interned at Donington Hall for twenty-one months. He was then extradited to the United States, tried and found guilty in a Federal court in New York, and imprisoned in Atlanta, Georgia, for three years, after the U.S. entered the war.

He returned to an impoverished and defeated Weimar Republic in 1920, a forgotten man. Later, Captain von Rintelen detested Adolf Hitler and moved to Britain when the latter became Chancellor in 1933. According to some sources, Captain von Rintelen despised the Nazi Party so intensely that, during World War II, he willingly taught the Special Operations Executive how to construct and use all of his former bombs and incendiary devices.

He was writing to British fascist Captain Robert Gordon-Canning, on 20 June 1945, whilst Gordon-Canning was interned (source declassified in 2002, MI5 papers on Captain Gordon-Canning).

Captain von Rintelen died on 30 May 1949 in London.

== Legacy ==
- Von Rintelen wrote The Dark Invader: War-Time Reminiscences Of A German Naval Intelligence Officer which was published in 1933.
- The scanned version of the original Penguin Books 1933 edition is available on line at Project Gutenberg Australia

== Sources ==
- Franz von Rintelen (1998). The Dark Invader: Wartime Reminiscences of a German Naval Intelligence Officer (October 31, 1998 ed.). Routledge. p. 326. ISBN 0-7146-4792-6.
- Tuchman, Barbara W. The Zimmermann Telegram. New York: NEL Mentor, 1967.
