= Black Tom explosion =

1916 sabotage and munitions explosion in New York Harbor

- Part of American entry into World War I
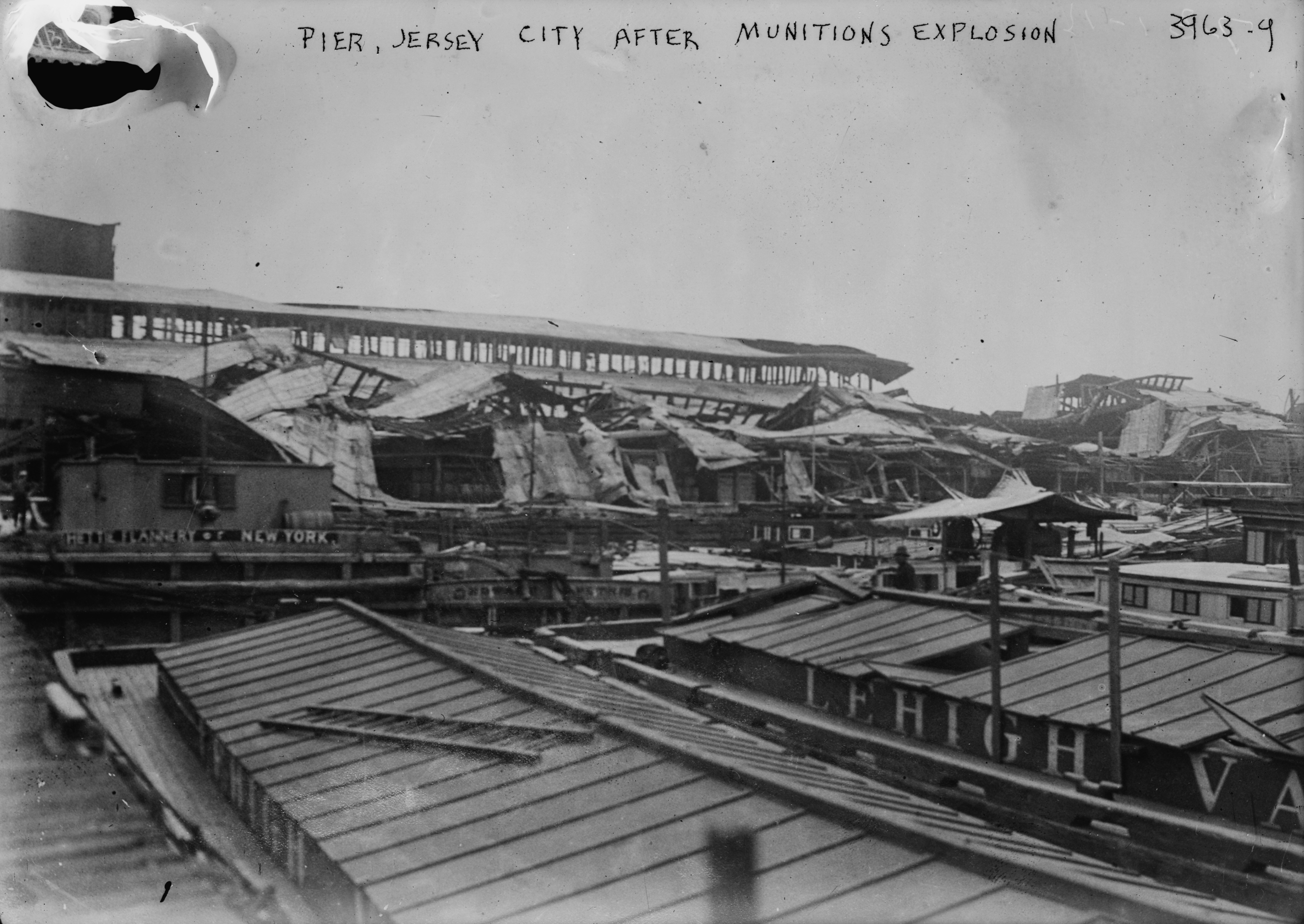
- Black Tom pier shortly after the explosion
- Location: 40°41′32″N 74°03′20″W; Jersey City, New Jersey, U.S.
- Date: July 30, 1916; 2:08:00 a.m. (EST; UTC−5)
- Attack type: Arson, sabotage
- Deaths: 7
- Injuries: >100
- Perpetrators: Imperial German agents: Kurt Jahnke; Lothar Witzke; Michael Kristoff (alleged)
- Motive: Deny munitions to Allied powers

The Black Tom explosion was an act of arson and sabotage by field agents of the Office of Naval Intelligence of the German Empire to destroy U.S.-made munitions awaiting shipment to the Allies during World War I. The explosions occurred on July 30, 1916, in New York Harbor, killing at least seven people and wounding hundreds more. It also caused damage to military goods worth some $20 million ($590 million in 2025 dollars). This incident, which happened before the United States entry into World War I, also damaged the Statue of Liberty. It is one of the largest artificial non-nuclear explosions in history.

== Black Tom Island ==
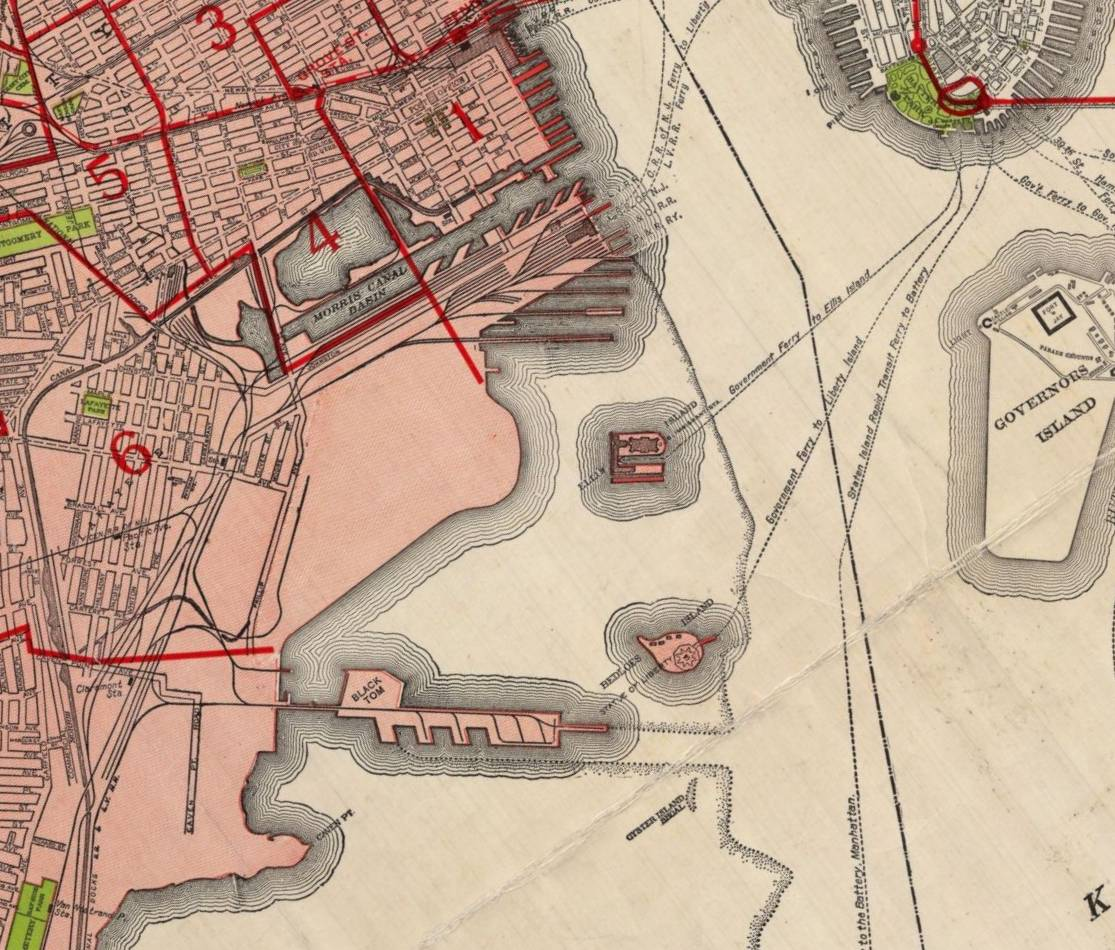
Black Tom Island, lying off Jersey City, 1915

The term "Black Tom" originally referred to an island in New York Harbor next to Liberty Island, named for a "dark-skinned" fisherman who inhabited the island for many years. The island was artificial, created by landfill around a rock of the same name, which had been a local hazard to navigation. Largely built from city refuse, it developed a reputation as an unseemly environmental hazard. The island was the site of two different explosions. The first occurred on January 26, 1875, when an accidental explosion in a powder factory killed four people. The more famous and deadly explosion occurred on July 30, 1916. By 1880, the island had been transformed into a 25-acre (10 ha) promontory, and a causeway and railroad had been built to connect it with the mainland to enable its use as a shipping depot. Between 1905 and 1916, the Lehigh Valley Railroad, which owned the island and causeway, expanded the island with landfill, and the entire area was annexed by Jersey City. A 1 mi (1.6 km)-long pier on the island housed a depot and warehouses for the National Dock and Storage Company. Black Tom Island is now part of Liberty State Park.

Black Tom was a major munitions depot for the Northeastern United States. Until April 6, 1917, the United States was neutral in respect to World War I, and its munitions companies earlier in the war could sell to any buyer. Due to the Royal Navy's blockade of Germany, however, only Allied governments could purchase American munitions. As a result, Imperial Germany sent spies to the United States to disrupt by any means necessary the production and delivery of war munitions intended to kill German soldiers on the battlefields of the Great War.

== Explosion ==
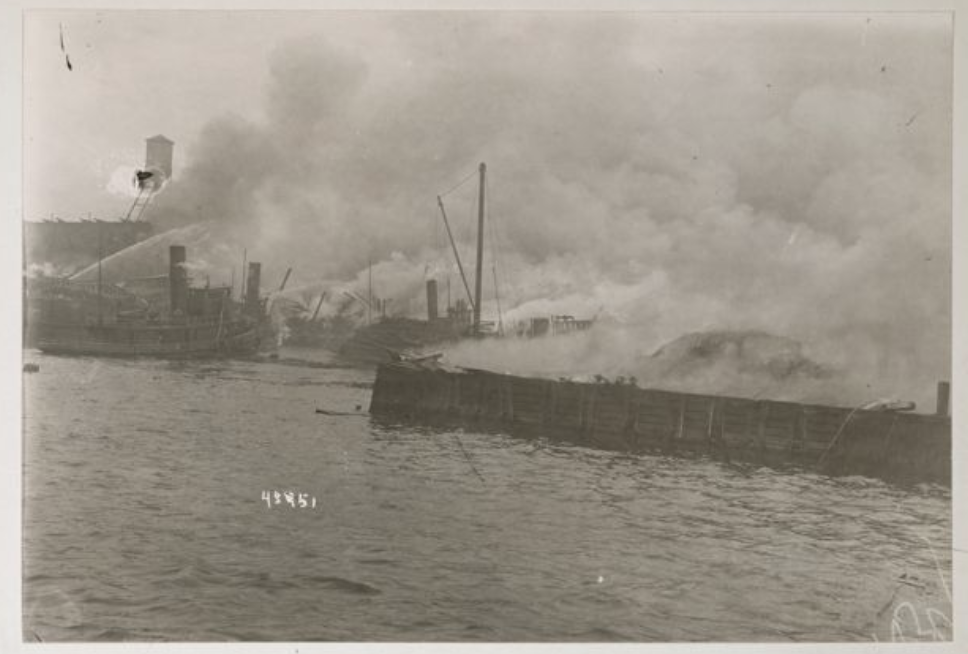
Burning barges cut loose from the docks at Black Tom, New Jersey, following the 1916 explosion

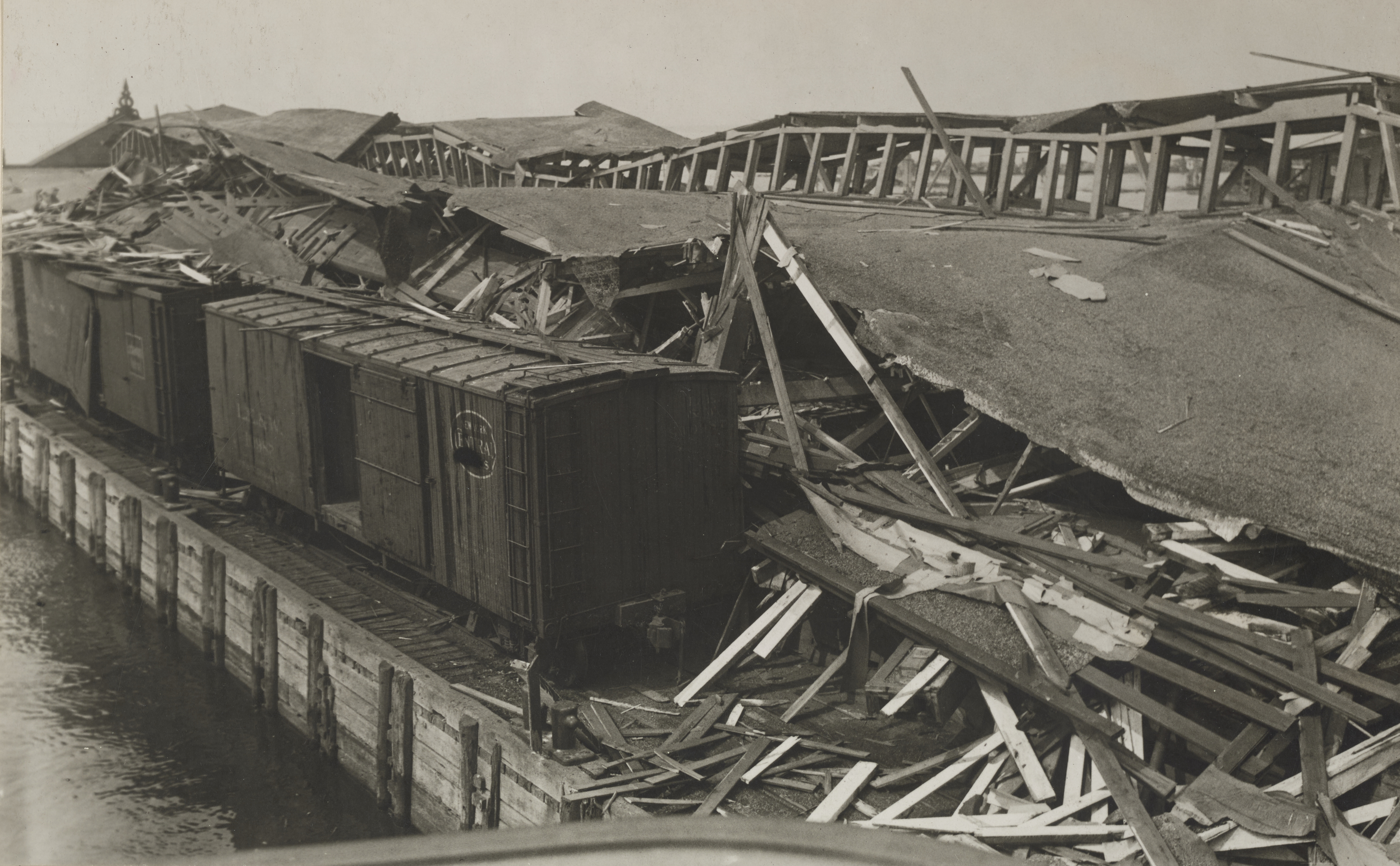
View of the Lehigh Valley pier after the explosion

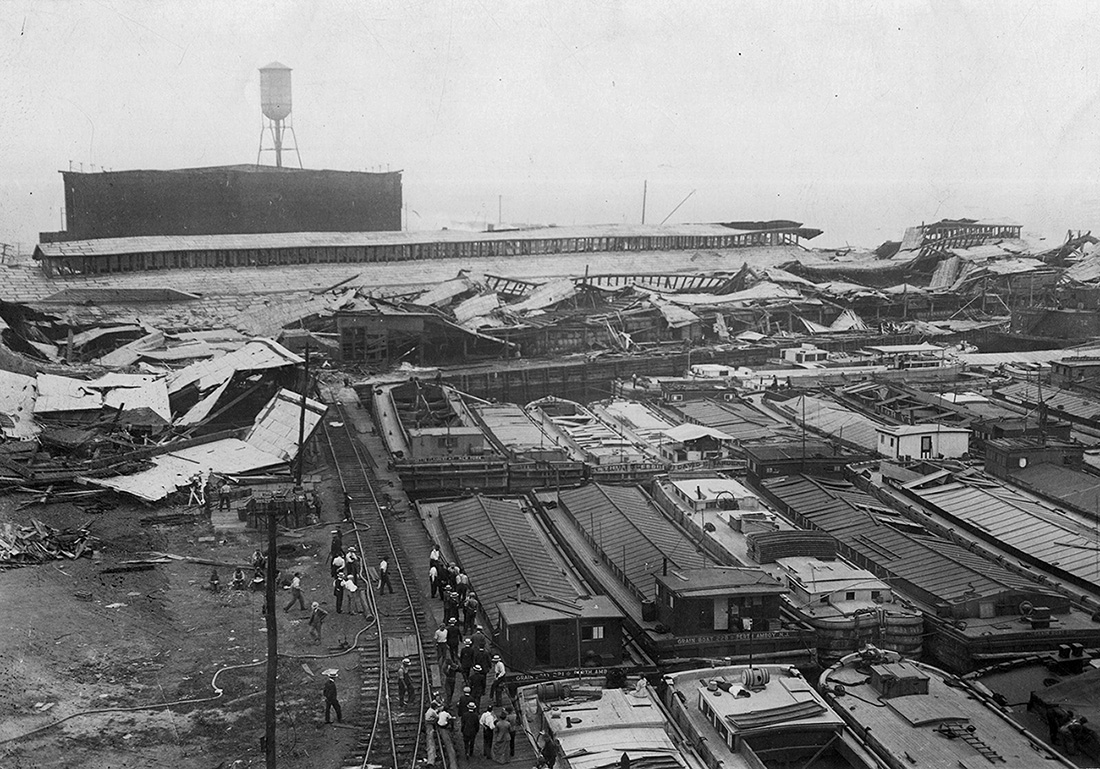
Wrecked warehouses and scattered debris after the explosion

On the night of the Black Tom explosion, July 30, 1916, about 2,000,000 pounds (910 t) of small arms and artillery ammunition were stored at the depot in freight cars and on barges, including 100,000 pounds (45 t) of TNT on Johnson Barge No. 17. All were waiting to be shipped to Russia. Jersey City's Commissioner of Public Safety, Frank Hague, later said he had been told the barge was "tied up at Black Tom to avoid a twenty-five dollar charge".

After midnight, a series of small fires were discovered on the pier. Some guards fled, fearing an explosion. Others attempted to fight the fires and eventually called the Jersey City Fire Department. At 2:08 am, the first and largest of the explosions took place. Around 2:40 am, the second and smaller explosion occurred. A notable location for one of the first major explosions was around the Johnson Barge No. 17, which contained 50 tons of TNT and 417 cases of detonating fuses.

Fragments from the explosion traveled long distances: some lodged in the Statue of Liberty, and others in the clock tower of The Jersey Journal building in Journal Square over 1 mile (1.6 km) away, stopping the clock at 2:12 am. The explosion was the equivalent of an earthquake measuring between 5.0 and 5.5 on the Richter scale and was felt as far away as Philadelphia. Windows were broken as far as 25 miles (40 km) away, including thousands in Lower Manhattan. Some window panes in Times Square were shattered. The stained glass windows in St. Patrick's Church were destroyed. The outer wall of Jersey City's City Hall was cracked and the Brooklyn Bridge was shaken. People as far away as Maryland were awakened by what they thought was an earthquake.

Property damage from the attack was estimated at $20,000,000 (equivalent to about $592,000,000 in 2025). On the island, the explosion destroyed over one hundred railroad cars and warehouses, and left a 375-by-175-foot (110 by 50 m) crater at its source. The damage to the Statue of Liberty was estimated to be $100,000 (equivalent to about $2,960,000 in 2025), and included damage to the skirt and torch.

There were several reported fatalities in the explosion: the barge captain, Jersey City Police Department officer James F. Doherty, Lehigh Valley Railroad chief of police Joseph Leyden, and ten-week-old infant Arthur Tosson. One contemporary newspaper report estimated as many as seven deaths in the attack.

== Investigation ==
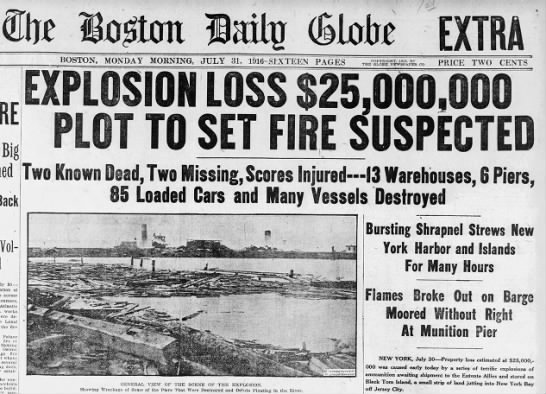
Newspaper headline about the Black Tom explosion

Soon after the explosion, the police questioned two watchmen who had lit smudge pots to keep away mosquitoes but soon determined that the smudge pots did not cause the fire and that the blast was likely an accident. President Wilson remarked that the event was "a regrettable incident at a private railroad terminal", and Edgar E. Clark of the Interstate Commerce Commission was dispatched to investigate.

Soon afterward, Slovak immigrant Michael Kristoff was suspected, Kristoff later served in the United States Army in World War I, but admitted to working for German agents (transporting suitcases) in 1915 and 1916 while the U.S. was still neutral. According to Kristoff, two guards at Black Tom were German agents.

Some, including the American journalist H. R. Baukhage in a 1964 article, argued that the bombing probably involved techniques developed by German agents working for Ambassador Count Johann Heinrich von Bernstorff, who acted covertly as a spymaster while using German Foreign Office cover. The historian Ethel Mary Tinnemann dismissed such theories outright, stating in her 1960 dissertation about von Bernstorff that he and his staff had nothing to do with the incident. Captain Franz von Rintelen of the intelligence wing of the German Imperial Navy may have also been involved, using the cigar bombs developed by Dr. Walter Scheele. Von Rintelen had many resources at his disposal, including a large amount of money. Von Rintelen used these resources to make generous cash bribes; one was notably given to Michael Kristoff in exchange for access to the pier. German intelligence operatives Kurt Jahnke and Lothar Witzke were then suspected, and are still judged as responsible legally. It is also believed that Kristoff was responsible for planting and initiating the incendiary devices that caused the explosions.

Other than diplomats and a few military and naval attaches, the United States did not have an established national intelligence service at the time, making the investigation difficult. Without a formal intelligence service, the United States had only rudimentary communications security and no federal laws forbidding espionage or sabotage except during wartime, making the associations with the saboteurs and accomplices almost impossible to track.

== Aftermath ==
This attack was one of many during the German sabotage campaign against the neutral United States, and is notable for its contribution to the shift of public opinion against Germany, which eventually resulted in American approval for participating in World War I.

The Russian Provisional Government (formed in March 1917) sued the Lehigh Valley Railroad Company operating the Black Tom Terminal on grounds that lax security (no entrance gate existed and the facility was unlit) permitted the loss of their ammunition and argued that due to the failure to deliver them the manufacturer was obliged by the contract to replace them.

After the war, the Lehigh Valley Railroad, advised by John J. McCloy, sought damages from Germany under the Treaty of Berlin before the German-American Mixed Claims Commission. The Mixed Claims Commission declared in 1939 that Imperial Germany was responsible and awarded $50 million (the largest claim) in damages, which Nazi Germany refused to pay. The issue was finally settled in 1953 for $95 million (interest included) with the Federal Republic of Germany. The final payment was made in 1979.

The Statue of Liberty's torch was closed to the public after the explosion, due to structural damage. Access was not opened even after the 1984–1986 restoration which included repairs to the arm and installation of a new gold-plated copper torch.

Kurt Jahnke evaded capture. He later served as an Abwehr agent during World War II. Jahnke worked as intelligence advisor to Walter Schellenberg. He and his wife were captured by Soviet SMERSH agents in April 1945 and interrogated. In 1950, Jahnke was put on trial as a spy, found guilty, and executed the same day.

Witzke was arrested at the Mexican border on February 1, 1918, near Nogales, Arizona. U.S. officials did not prosecute him for the bombing but rather as a spy. A military court at Fort Sam Houston found him guilty of espionage and sentenced him to death by hanging. While in custody, he tried to escape twice and succeeded once, but was recaptured the same day. On November 2, 1918, Witzke's death sentence was approved by the Department Commander. However, he was not executed because of the November Armistice. In May 1920, President Woodrow Wilson commuted Witzke's sentence to life in prison. In September 1923, Witzke, as a result of good conduct in prison and pressure for his release by the Weimar Republic, was pardoned by President Calvin Coolidge, and deported to Germany. Upon his arrival, Witzke was awarded the Iron Cross, First and Second Class, by the Reichswehr. Witzke later joined the Abwehr, and after World War II, lived in Hamburg. He was a monarchist who represented the German Party in the Hamburg Parliament from 1949 to 1952. Witzke died in 1962.

Kristoff was arrested by the Jersey City police on suspicion of involvement in the blast, but was later released due to a lack of evidence. Over the next several years, he drifted in and out of prison for various crimes. Kristoff died of tuberculosis in 1928.

== Legacy ==
The Black Tom explosion resulted in the establishment of domestic intelligence agencies for the United States. Then-Police Commissioner of New York Arthur H. Woods argued, "The lessons to America are clear as day. We must not again be caught napping with no adequate national intelligence organization. The several federal bureaus should be welded into one and that one should be eternally and comprehensively vigilant." The explosion also played a role in how future presidents responded to military conflict. President Franklin D. Roosevelt used the Black Tom explosion as part of his rationale for the internment of Japanese Americans after the attack on Pearl Harbor in 1941. In an interview with Jules Witcover, McCloy noted that as assistant secretary of the navy for President Wilson, Roosevelt "knew all about Black Tom". At the time President Roosevelt said to him: "We don't want any more Black Toms".

The incident also influenced public safety legislation. The sabotage techniques used by Germany, and the United States' declaration of war on Germany, resulted in the creation of the Espionage Act, which passed by Congress in late 1917. Landfill projects later made Black Tom Island part of the mainland, and it was incorporated into Liberty State Park. The former Black Tom Island is at the end of Morris Pesin Drive in the southeastern corner of the park, where a plaque marks the spot of the explosion. A circle of U.S. flags complements the plaque, which stands east of the visitors' facility.

The inscription on the plaque reads:

Explosion at Liberty!

On July 30, 1916 the Black Tom munitions depot exploded rocking New York Harbor and sending residents tumbling from their beds.

The noise of the explosion was heard as far away as Maryland and Connecticut. On Ellis Island, terrified immigrants were evacuated by ferry to the Battery. Shrapnel pierced the Statue of Liberty (the arm of the Statue was closed to visitors after this). Property damage was estimated at $20 million. It is not known how many died.

Why the explosion? Was it an accident or planned? According to historians, the Germans sabotaged the Lehigh Valley munitions depot in order to stop deliveries being made to the British who had blockaded the Germans in Europe.

You are walking on a site which saw one of the worse [sic] acts of terrorism in American history.

A stained-glass window at Our Lady of Częstochowa Catholic church memorialized the victims of the attack.

Gallery

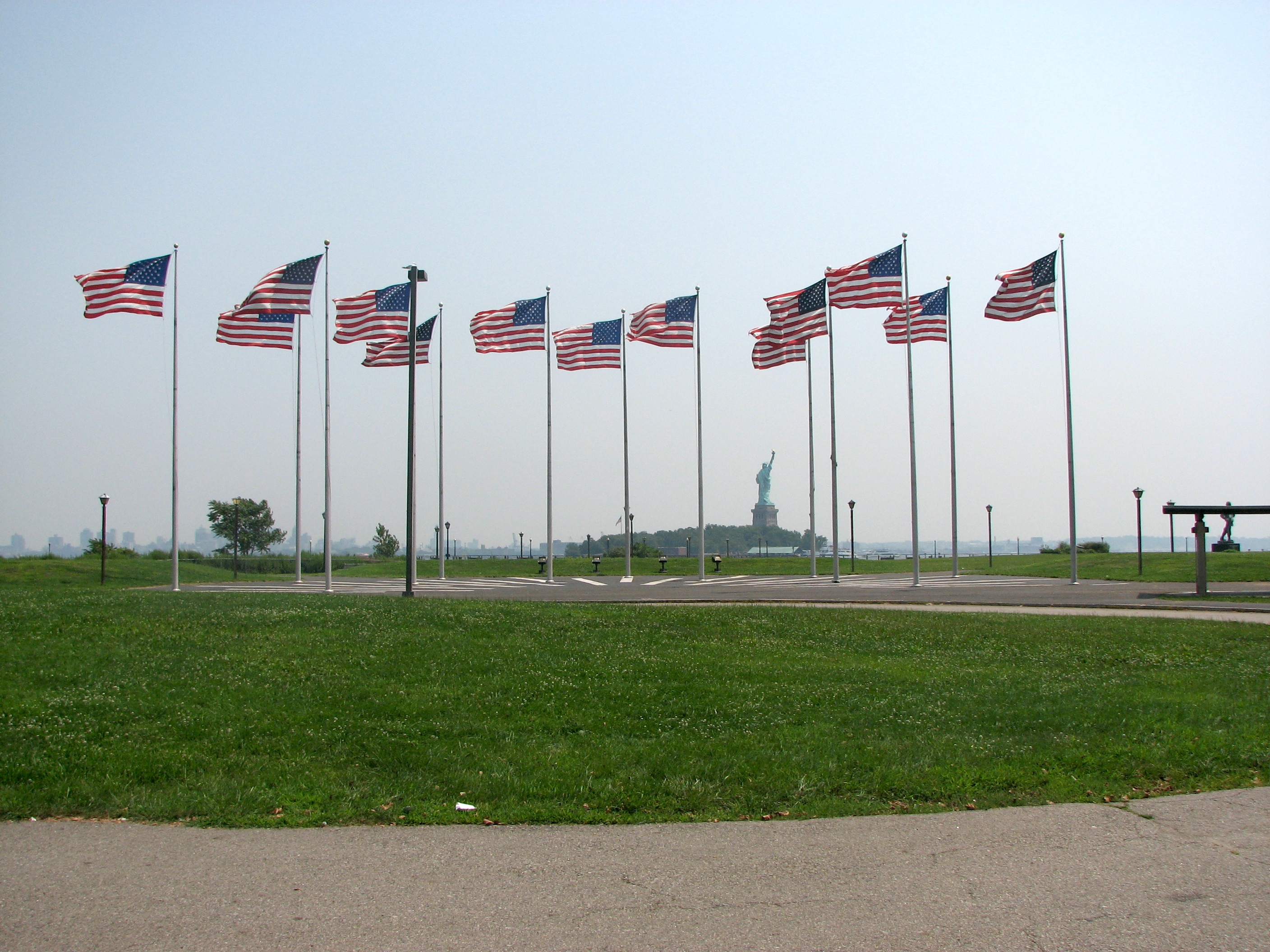
View of the Statue of Liberty from the site of the explosion: The explosion caused $100,000 worth of damage to the statue, and from then onward the torch has been closed to tourists.

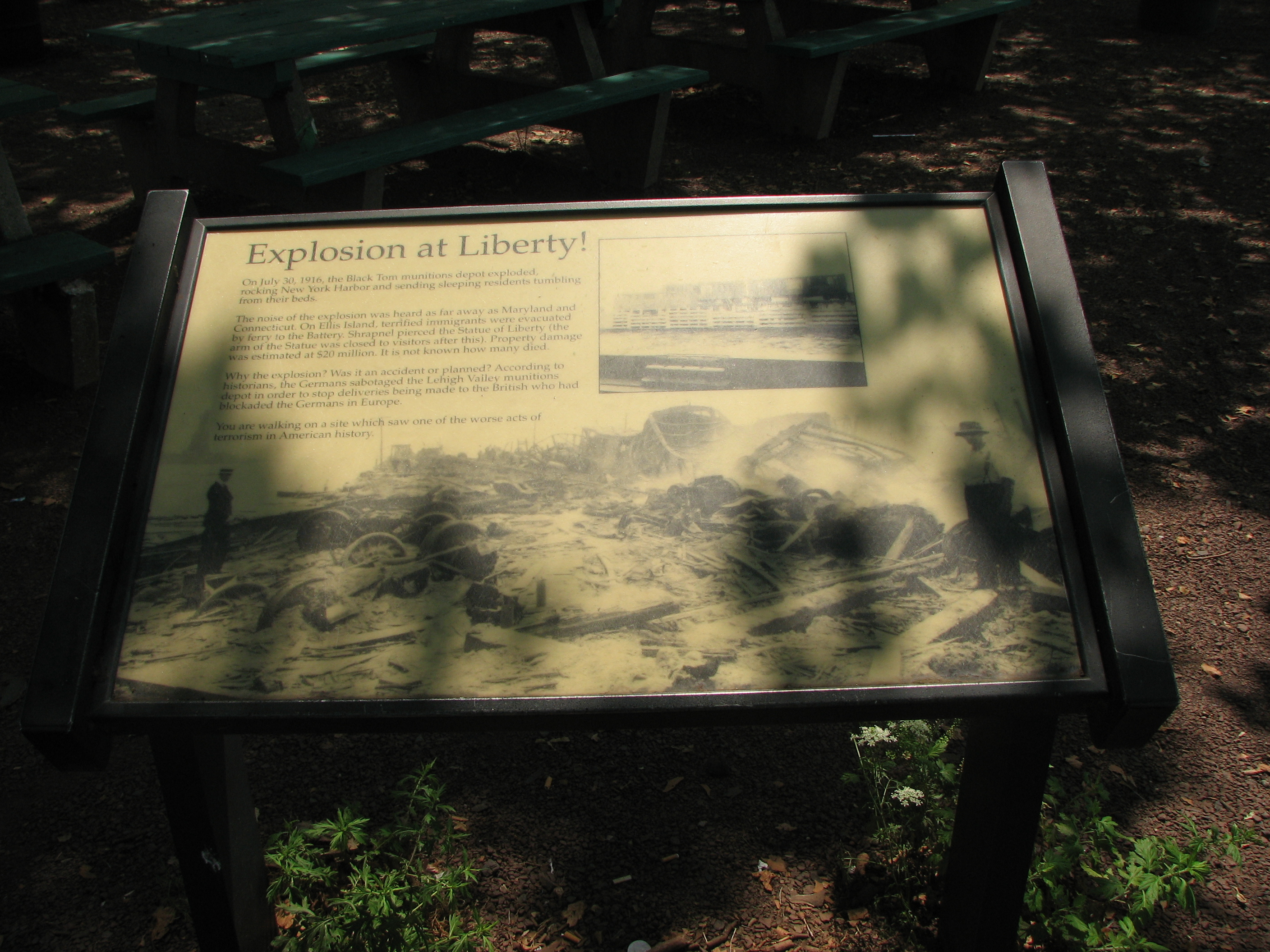
Commemorative plaque

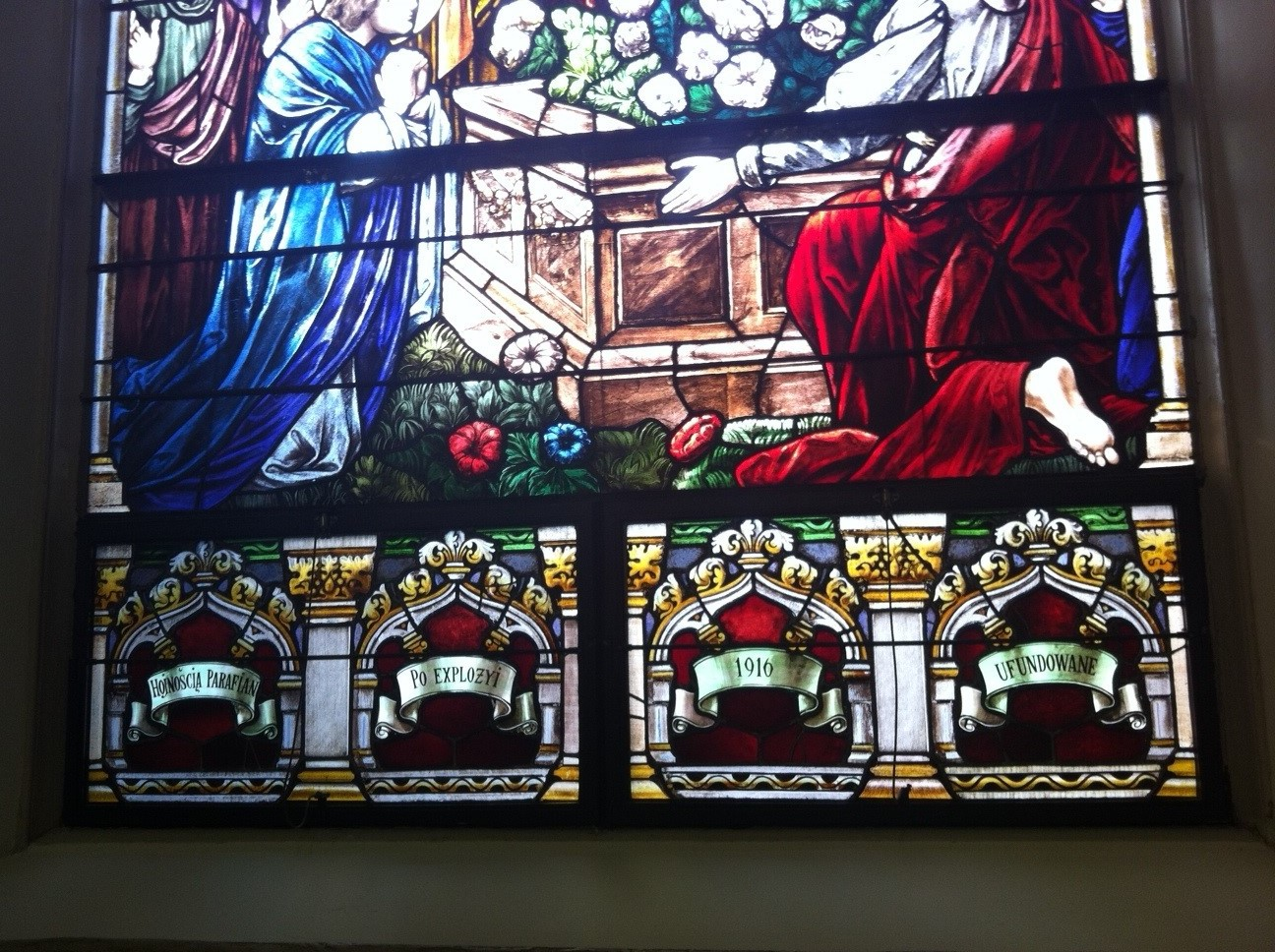
Stained-glass windows from inside Our Lady of Częstochowa Catholic Church in Jersey City, New Jersey. The bottom stained-glass windows have text in Polish to commemorate the explosion in 1916.

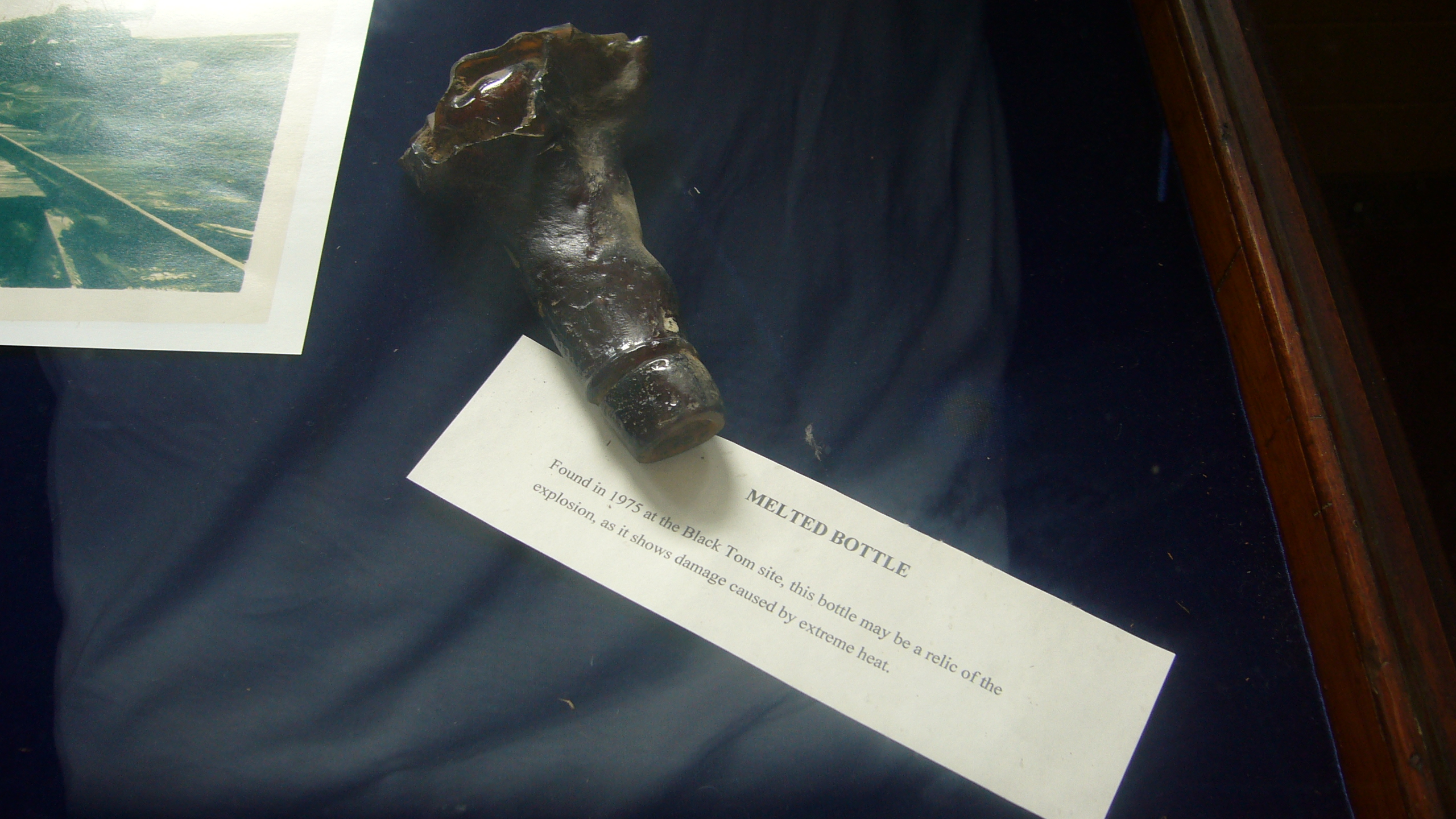
Melted bottle from the Black Tom explosion

== See also ==
- Attacks on the United States
- Anton Dilger
- Halifax explosion
- Kingsland explosion
- Largest artificial non-nuclear explosions
- List of accidents and incidents involving transport or storage of ammunition
- List of German-sponsored acts of terrorism during World War I
- SS El Estero, fire and averted explosion near same location in World War II
- United States in World War I
- Zimmermann Telegram

== Bibliography ==
- Millman, Chad (2006). The Detonators: The Secret Plot to Destroy America and an Epic Hunt for Justice. Little, Brown and Company. p. 352. ISBN 0-316-73496-9.
- Semple, Ron (2015). Black Tom: Terror on the Hudson. Top Hat Books. ISBN 978-1-78535-110-5.
- Witcover, Jules (1989). Sabotage at Black Tom: Imperial Germany's Secret in America, 1914–1917. Algonquin Books. p. 339. ISBN 0-912697-98-9.
