= David Lamar =

American con artist (c.1877–1934)

David Jr Lamar
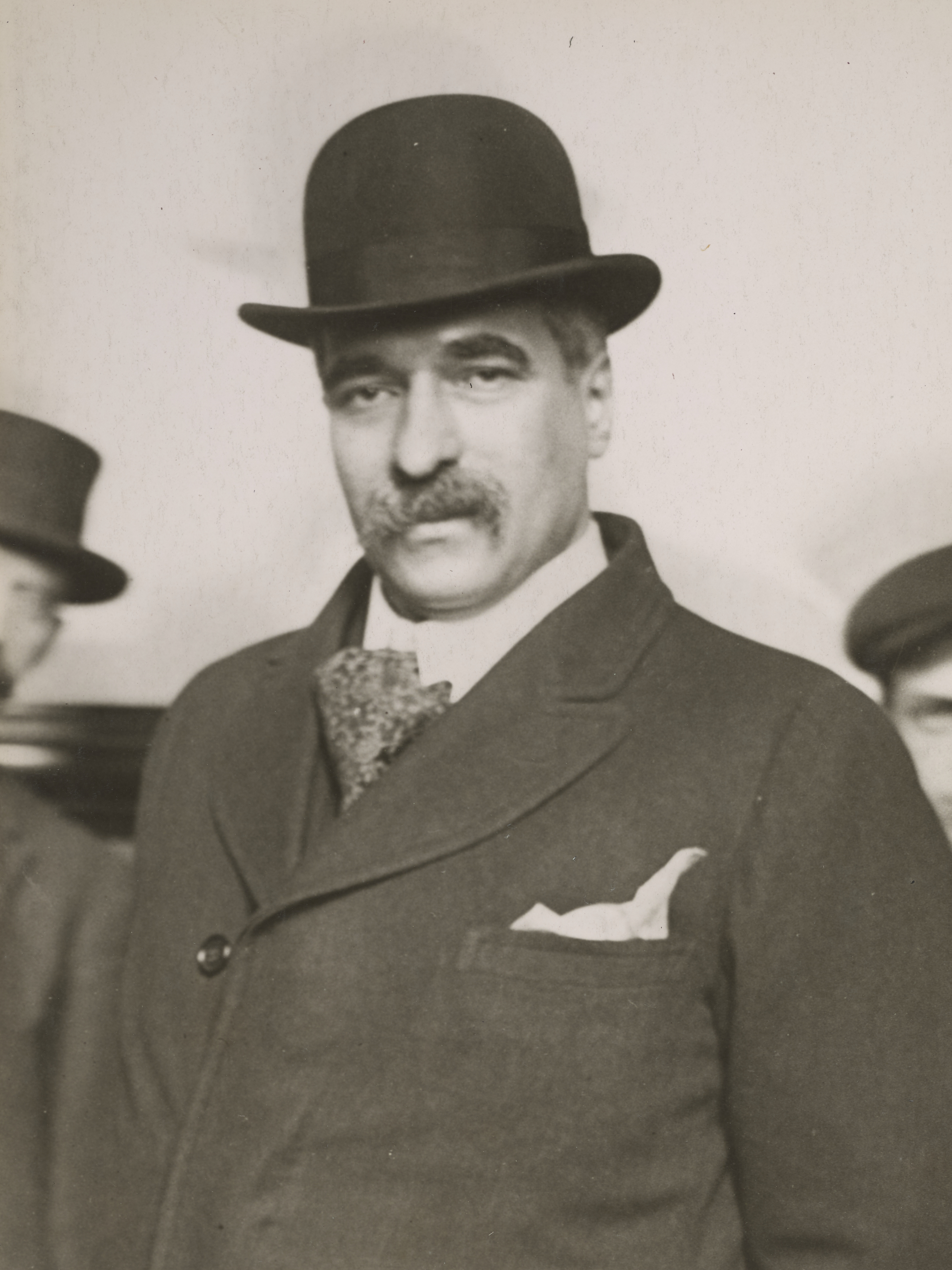
- David Lamar circa 1913
- Born: c. 1877; United States
- Died: January 12, 1934 (aged 56–57); United States
- Occupations: Con man; swindler; impersonator

David Lamar (c. 1877 – January 12, 1934) was a con man known as the Wolf of Wall Street.

== Biography ==
David Lamar was born circa 1877. His exact birth date is unknown; his 1934 obituary reports that he was 65 years old.

He appeared in New York City about 1893. In the 1890s "he had a Fifth Avenue house and was known for his trotting horses, his diamond studded walking stick, his appearances as a man about town."

In 1899, Lamar claimed one of his most famous victims was 25-year-old John D. Rockefeller, Jr. Working through George Rogers, secretary to Standard Oil founder John D. Rockefeller, Sr., Lamar convinced the younger Rockefeller to buy stock in U.S. Leather, using money he had borrowed from his father. As Rockefeller Jr. was buying, Lamar was selling, and the younger Rockefeller lost nearly $1 million.

On July 9, 1903, when his coachman James McMahon appeared in court to testify against Lamar on an assault charge, McMahon was stabbed and beaten by members of the Eastman Gang as he entered the courthouse and he was unable to testify.

His obituary noted two brazen swindle attempts in which he hired two men as "hold up experts" in lawsuits he brought against the U.S. Steel Corporation and the Great Northern Railroad and the Northern Pacific Railroads; his "experts" were exposed as frauds.

A 1913 profile of him remarked that he appeared to be wealthy at times and broke other times. That same year in New York, Lamar was indicted and charged with impersonating Congressman A. Mitchell Palmer.

During 1915, Lamar acted as an agent for Franz von Rintelen, a captain in the intelligence wing of the German Imperial Navy who operated covertly in New York City. Lamar promoted strike action and work stoppages in munitions factories by means of the Labor's National Peace Council. From offices at 55 Liberty Street, Captain von Rintelen spent US$500,000, much of which went to Lamar, whose reports of his success were greatly exaggerated.

For impersonating a Congressman, Lamar was sentenced to two years to the Federal Atlanta Prison in May 1916. In October 1916, while serving his Atlanta Prison sentence, he was working as a tailor.

In 1923 after losing an appeal on a conspiracy charge, he fled New York City and was found 8 months later in Mexico and sent to the Essex County Penitentiary in North Caldwell, New Jersey, for one year for being involved in strikes in munition factories; he was released in 1924. In 1924 his first wife divorced him and retained custody of their daughter Dorothy. On November 22, 1925, in Ridgefield, Connecticut, he married a stage and screen actress Edna Eck aka Edna Fretch; in August 1926 he was served with a subpoena in regard to alleged stock manipulation of Consolidated Distributors [Motor parts]; after Lamar's demise—according to his attorney—Lamar had not been in the money since 1929.

Lamar died in a New York City Hotel room of heart disease on January 13, 1934.

== Sources ==
- Tuchman, Barbara W. The Zimmermann Telegram. New York: NEL Mentor, 1967.
- von Feilitzsch, Heribert The Secret War on the United States in 1915: A Tale of Sabotage, Labor Unrest and Border Troubles. Amissville: Henselstone Verlag, 2015
