= Witzke =

Witzke is a surname. Notable people with the surname include:

- Lauren Witzke (born 1988), American anti-gay activist and conspiracy theorist
- Lothar Witzke (1895–1962), German naval officer
