= T. A. Gillespie Company Shell Loading Plant explosion =

1918 explosion at American ammunition plant

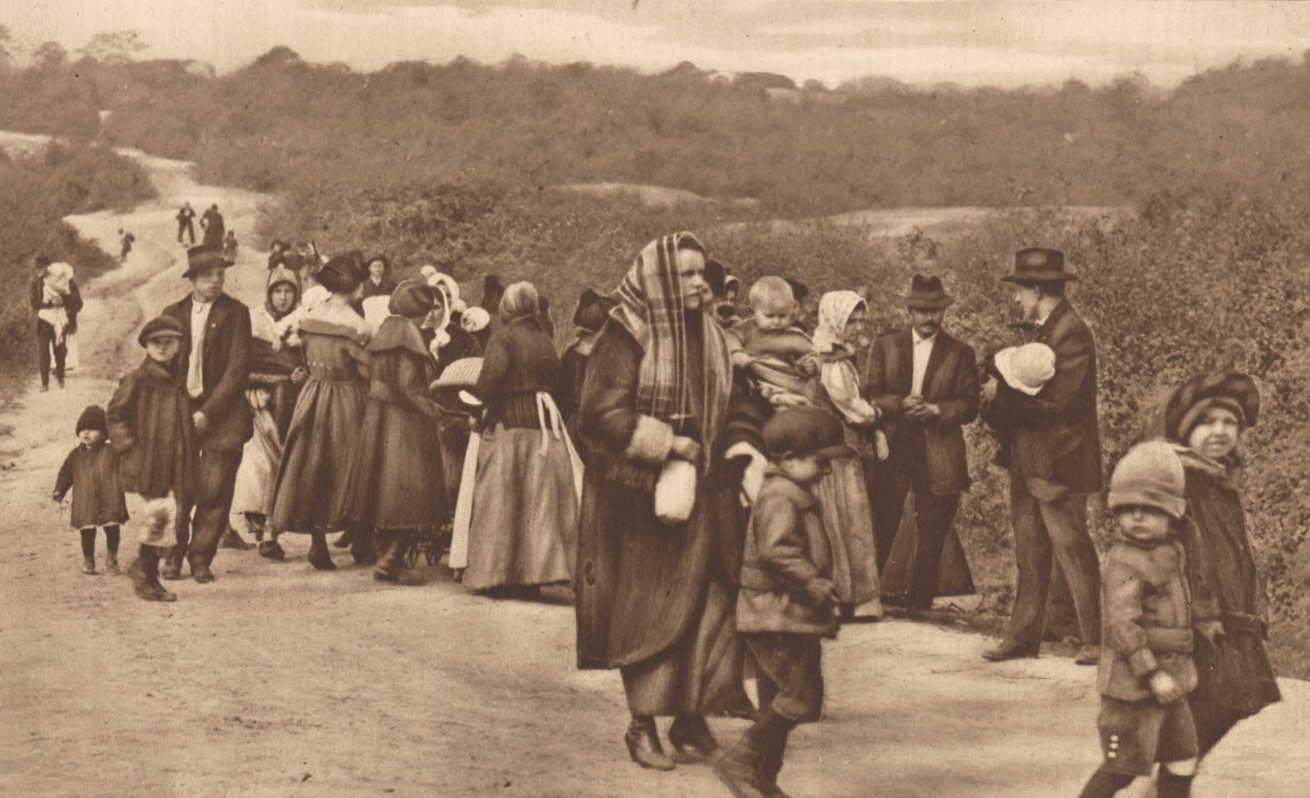
- Residents evacuating after the explosions
- Date: October 4, 1918 to October 6, 1918
- Time: 7:36 pm EDT (start)
- Location: Sayreville, New Jersey, U.S.; 40°27′42″N 74°17′23″W
- Also known as: Morgan Munitions Depot explosion
- Cause: Worker error or (speculative) German sabotage
- Participants: US Coast Guard, US Army
- Outcome: Plant abandoned following Armistice
- Deaths: ~100 estimated
- Injuries: 100+
- Missing: ~18
- Property damage: Complete destruction of plant ($18 million in 1918); major damage to 300+ buildings in Sayreville, South Amboy, and Perth Amboy, NJ; broken windows for 20 miles (32 km) around.

Explosion site (Middlesex County, New Jersey)

The T. A. Gillespie Company Shell Loading Plant explosion, sometimes called the Morgan Munitions Depot explosion or similar titles, began at 7:36 pm EDT on Friday, October 4, 1918, at a World War I ammunition plant in the Morgan area of Sayreville in Middlesex County, New Jersey, United States. The initial explosion, generally believed to be accidental, triggered a fire and subsequent series of explosions that continued for three days, totaling approximately six kilotons, killing about 100 people and injuring hundreds more. The facility, one of the largest in the world at the time, was destroyed along with more than 300 surrounding buildings, forcing the evacuation and reconstruction of Sayreville, South Amboy, and Laurence Harbor (Old Bridge). Over a century later, explosive debris continues to surface regularly across a 1.2-mile (1.9 km) radius.

== T. A. Gillespie ==
T. A. Gillespie Company, founded by Thomas Andrew Gillespie (1852–1926), was operating a subsidiary named the American Shell Company, loading artillery shells for overseas military action during World War I. After the war, the company was renamed Gillespie Motor Company in 1919, merged to form Gillespie-Eden Corporation in 1920, and disappeared sometime after 1923. The initial Morgan explosion, according to the US Army Corps of Engineers, was in Building 6-1-1, at the present-day residential block bounded by Dusko, Gillen and Rota Drives. The full plant employed more than 6,000 workers in round-the-clock production.

== Damages ==
Damage to the plant was estimated to be $18 million and the US government paid $300,000 in insurance to area residents ($360 million and $6 million in 2025 dollars, respectively). According to a 1919 government report, the explosion destroyed enough ammunition to supply the Western Front for six months, estimated at 12 million pounds (6 kilotons) of high explosives. The plant had started production three months earlier, and the war ended one month after the explosion. While hundreds of detonations were spread over three days, the totality of the event ranked as one of the largest man-made non-nuclear explosions in history. Some of the strongest individual blasts, from exploding storehouses or railcars of ammunition, broke windows as far away as Manhattan and Asbury Park, more than 20 miles (32 km) distant.

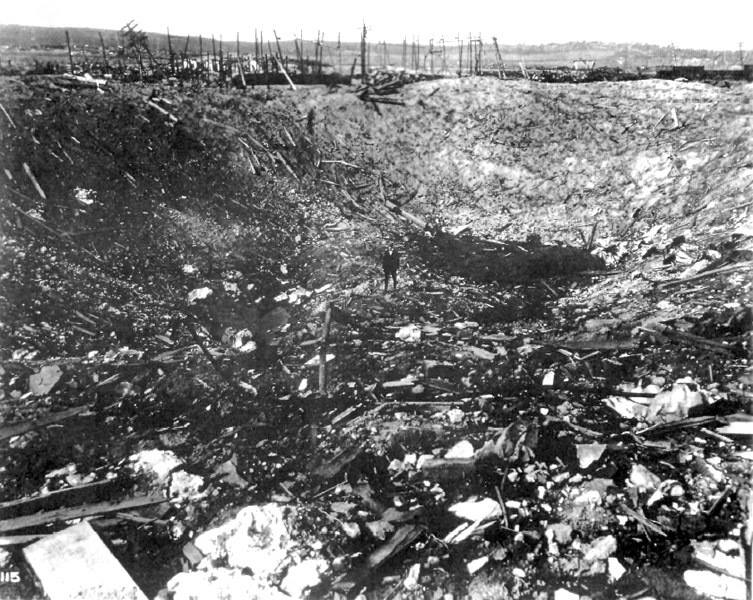
Man standing in a large crater from the explosion of 1 million pounds (0.5 kiloton) of stored ammonium nitrate. The overall event exploded 12 times this amount.

== Casualties ==
The death toll for the accident is unclear, as employment records were destroyed by the explosion and ammunition workers were individually uninsurable. The total is believed to be approximately 100 people, with hundreds more injured. Many victims disintegrated in the explosions and fires, and the unidentified remains of 14 to 18 workers were buried in a mass grave off Ernston Road in what is now Old Bridge Township. The inscription reads: "In memory of the unidentified dead who gave their lives while in the service of the United States of America, at the Morgan Shell Loading Plant in the explosion of October 4–5, 1918."

Government authorities declared martial law following the accident and ordered the evacuation of Sayreville, South Amboy, and Perth Amboy, whose combined populations totaled approximately 62,000. Evacuated and homeless persons were more susceptible to the severe influenza pandemic that struck a few weeks later, and the area's death toll from the outbreak was high.

== Coast Guard involvement ==
Among many others involved in rescue operations were US Coast Guardsmen stationed across the Raritan River in Perth Amboy. Twelve received Navy Crosses for their heroic actions in the aftermath of the explosion, and two died in the effort. The award citations indicate that during the conflagration, they risked death when they moved a train loaded with TNT that was threatened by the fire. One Navy Cross recipient was Joseph Stika, who later became a vice admiral.

== Legacy ==
The explosions scattered thousands of shells and components over a wide area, more than 1.2 miles (1.9 km) in radius. Nearly a century later, unexploded ordnance from the facility was still being found in the surrounding area. On June 7, 2007, ordnance was discovered at Samsel Upper Elementary School while workers were grading an area for a playground. A local safety official said, "We find these things a couple of times a year in town", and Explosive Ordnance Disposal specialists from the US Army were called in to remove the material. Previously, in 1994 and again in 1997, the discovery of shells near Sayreville's Dwight D. Eisenhower Elementary School spurred larger cleanup operations by the US Army Corps of Engineers, which collected and disposed of a combined total of 5,080 pieces of ordnance.

Local historians Frank Yusko and Randall Gabrielan compiled detailed histories about the explosions for a 1994 television documentary and a 2012 book, respectively.

The sports teams of Sayreville War Memorial High School are named the Sayreville Bombers, recalling the town's World War I ammunition plants and many World War II veterans.

== See also ==
- Black Tom explosion (1916)
- Halifax Explosion (1917)
- Kingsland explosion (1917)
- Picatinny Arsenal (1926)
- Port Chicago disaster (1944)
- South Amboy powder pier explosion (1950)
- List of accidents and incidents involving transport or storage of ammunition
