= Pencil bomb attacks =

Bombings during WWI

Pencil bomb plot
- Location: American shipping
- Date: World War I
- Attack type: Sabotage
- Perpetrator: Imperial German agents
- Motive: sabotage

The term pencil bomb attacks refers to multiple acts of sabotage carried out by Imperial Germany during World War I. The pencil bombs were a type of incendiary time bomb designed by German chemist Walter Scheele and used by German field agent Captain Franz von Rintelen of the intelligence wing of the German Imperial Navy during World War I.

== Design ==
When the bomb prototype was first shown to von Rintelen by Scheele it was a hollow cylinder of lead the size of a large cigar. Into the middle of the tube a circular disc of copper had been pressed and soldered, dividing it into two chambers. One of these chambers was filled with picric acid, the other with sulfuric acid or some other nonflammable liquid. A strong plug made of wax with a simple lead cap made both ends airtight. The copper disc could be as thick or as thin as desired. If it were thick, the two acids on either side took a long time to eat their way through. If it were thin, the mingling of the two acids would occur within a few days. By regulating the thickness of the disc it was possible to determine the time when the acids should come together. This formed a safe and efficient time-fuse. When the two acids mingled at the appointed time, a silent but intense flame, from twenty to thirty centimetres long, shot out from both ends of the tube, and while it was still burning the lead casing melted away, leaving very little evidence of the source of the fire.

== Use ==
Von Rintelen and his ring of German agents would slip the bombs onto ships carrying munitions bound for war. The incendiary device ignited cargos when ships were far at sea. It was estimated later that he alone had destroyed $10 million (USD $214 million in 2025) worth of cargo on 36 ships.

== Manufacture ==
The first batch of bombs was manufactured on the SS Friedrich Der Grosse, a Norddeutscher Lloyd liner that at the outset of World War I was interned by the United States in New York harbour. German sailors from the ship helped in manufacture. The SS Phoebus was chosen as a test case and as was reported in the Shipping News, "Accidents. S.S. Phoebus from New York—destination Archangel—caught fire at sea. Brought into port of Liverpool by H.M.S. Ajax."

== See also ==
- Improvised explosive device
- Pencil detonator

== Bibliography ==
Notes

References

- King, Gilbert (November 1, 2011). "Sabotage in New York Harbor". Smithsonian Magazine.
- MacDonnell, Francis (September 19, 1995). Insidious Foes: The Axis Fifth Column and the American Home Front. Oxford University Press. ISBN 9780199879915.
- von Rintelen, Franz (1998). The Dark Invader: Wartime Reminiscences of a German Naval Intelligence Officer. F. Cass. ISBN 9780714647920. - Total pages: 271
- Wallace, Ed (November 1, 2007). "Disaster in New York" (PDF). Metroplex Atheists. Archived from the original (PDF) on October 7, 2011.
