= Kurt Jahnke =

German espionage agent

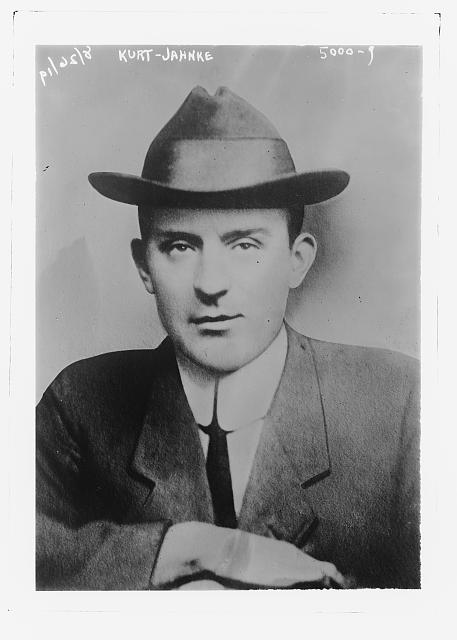
- Jahnke in 1915
- Born: Kurt Albert Jahnke; 17 February 1882; Gnesen, Prussia, German Empire
- Died: 22 April 1950 (aged 68); Moscow, Russian SFSR, Soviet Union
- Known for: Black Tom explosion
- Status: Executed by shooting
- Conviction: Espionage
- Penalty: Death

Kurt Albert Jahnke (17 February 1882 – 22 April 1950) was a German-American intelligence agent and convicted saboteur active both during World War I and World War II.

== Biography ==
Born in Gnesen, Jahnke immigrated to the United States in 1899, became a naturalized citizen, and later served in the U.S. Marines in the Philippines. From August 1914, under the command of the German Consul General Franz Bopp, Jahnke performed various intelligence and sabotage operations for the German Admiralty from his San Francisco base. He and his assistant, Lothar Witzke, were responsible for the April 1917 munitions explosion at the Mare Island Naval Shipyard in San Francisco, "likely" responsible for the Black Tom explosion in Jersey City, New Jersey, and are suspected of other explosions and of fomenting labor strikes. When the United States entered the war in April 1917, Jahnke and Witzke moved their operations to Mexico City.

According to the Senate testimony of intelligence officer and double agent Dr. Paul Altendorf, who was undercover in Mexico City with the U.S. Military Intelligence Corps from 1917 through April 1919, Jahnke had schemed a Mexican attack on the United States. An army of 45,000 men, funded by Ambassador von Eckardt and trained by German reservists, would march against the U.S. in 1918 and "arouse the Negroes to civil war."

Back in Germany in the late 1930s, Jahnke established the "Jahnke Büro", essentially a small private intelligence service reporting up to Rudolf Hess. There is speculation that Jahnke was somehow involved in Hess's still-puzzling flight to Scotland in May 1941; true or not, he fell out of favor with Ribbentrop and the Gestapo and his accumulated files were confiscated. Later in the war, Jahnke served as intelligence advisor to Walter Schellenberg. He and his wife were captured by Soviet SMERSH agents in April 1945 and interrogated. In 1950, Jahnke was put on trial as a spy, found guilty, and executed the same day.
