= List of accidents and incidents involving transport or storage of ammunition =

An accidental explosion of ammunition, during transport or storage, can be lethal and have far-reaching affects, especially on the population and environment around it. Between 1997 and 2007, there were 120 accidental ammunition storage explosions, killing more than 3,500 people.

== 17th century ==
- Wanggongchang Explosion, a gunpowder store explosion in 1626
- 1634 Valletta explosion, Malta
- The Delft Explosion, a gunpowder store explosion in 1654
- An Ottoman ammunition dump inside the Parthenon was ignited by Venetian bombardment in 1687

== 19th century ==
- 1806 Birgu polverista explosion, Malta
- Leiden gunpowder disaster, in 1807 a ship carrying 17,760 kg of gunpowder blew up in the Dutch town of Leiden.
- Siege of Almeida (1810), a chance shell ignited a line of black powder which set off a chain reaction in the magazine
- Negro Fort, a British-built fort on the Apalachicola River, occupied by fugitive slaves and Choctaws, was destroyed in 1816 when a hot-shot fired by a US gunboat landed in the fort's magazine.
- City Point, Virginia, Union army supply depot sabotaged in 1864 by Confederate Secret Service
- Yanwath, 1867 railway explosion when a freight train carrying 3 tons of gunpowder derailed and another freight train hit the wreckage.
- Regent's Park explosion, in 1874 a barge carrying 5 tons of gunpowder blew up on the Regent's Canal in London
- USS Maine, in Havana harbor in 1898 (origin of explosion is disputed)
- Kings Mills, Ohio, in 1890, freight cars on the Little Miami Railroad collided with cars containing gunpowder and cartridges from the King Powder Company and the Peters Cartridge Company, killing 11 and wounding about 100.
- SS Cabo Machichaco, steamship whose cargo of dynamite exploded twice while moored in the port of Santander, Spain, first in 1893 and a second time in 1894.

== 20th century ==
- Black Tom explosion, 1916 act of sabotage on American ammunition supplies by German agents during World War I
- Kingsland explosion, American munitions factory in 1917
- Halifax Explosion, 1917 ammunition ship explosion that killed over 1,600 people
- Morgan Depot Explosion, American munitions factory in 1918
- Pollepel Island, August 1920 explosion at Bannerman's Island Arsenal
- Dublin Four Courts explosion 1922 explosion of munitions stored by the anti-Treaty IRA in the Four Courts building in Dublin, which destroyed much of Ireland's pre-1921 public records.
- Lake Denmark explosion, July 10, 1926 detonation of millions of pounds of stored explosives at Picatinny Arsenal, New Jersey
- Smederevo Fortress explosion, the Wehrmacht stockpile of captured ammunition and gasoline at Smederevo Fortress exploded for unknown reasons
- Joliet Army Ammunition Plant explosion, a 1942 explosion that was felt 100 miles away
- Air raid on Bari, a port disaster in Italy in 1943
- SS El Estero, ammunition ship that caught fire in New York Harbor in 1943
- Naval Station Norfolk, September 17, 1943 accidental truckload explosion of 24 aerial depth charges, killing 40 and injuring 386
- Naval Weapons Station Yorktown November 1943 explosion – 6 killed
- USS Turner, 1943 naval explosion in Lower New York Bay
- Bombay Explosion (1944), explosion on a ship in Bombay Harbour
- SS Paul Hamilton, 20 April 1944, a Liberty ship carrying cargo of high explosives and bombs, sunk by Luftwaffe
- Soham rail disaster, 2 June 1944, fire and subsequent explosion of a freight wagon carrying high explosives.
- Aarhus harbor explosion, German ammunition barge explodes in Aarhus Harbor killing 39, 4 July 1944
- West Loch disaster, ammunition explosion in Pearl Harbor, two months before Port Chicago
- Port Chicago disaster, a deadly munitions explosion that occurred in 1944, at the Port Chicago Naval Magazine in California
- Hastings Naval Ammunition Depot, Nebraska, 27 September 1944 munitions explosions causing nine deaths and extensive damage.
- USS Mount Hood, 10 November 1944 explosion of an ammunition ship at Seeadler Harbor, 432 killed
- Tolar, New Mexico, 30 November 1944, munitions carried by train exploded, causing extensive damage to town and killing 1.
- RAF Fauld explosion, UK underground munitions storage depot in 1944, one of the largest non-nuclear explosions in history
- SS John Burke, a Liberty ship carrying ammunition, was hit by a kamikaze pilot and disintegrated in an enormous explosion on December 28, 1944.
- USS Serpens, 29 January 1945 explosion of an ammunition ship off Lunga Point, Guadalcanal. US Coast Guard-crewed. 254 killed (196 USCG, 57 US Army, and 1 US Public Health Service physician)
- SS Charles Henderson, unloading accident in Bari, Italy, 9 April 1945
- SS Canada Victory, Logan Victory and Hobbs Victory each with 6,000 pounds of ammunition sank after kamikaze attacks caused an explosion near Okinawa in 1945.
- SS Green Hill Park, 1945 incident in Vancouver similar to El Estero
- Bedford Magazine explosion, Halifax region, Canada. July 1945.
- Cádiz Explosion, 18 August 1947, in mines and torpedoes depot, ca. 150 killed and large part of the city destroyed
- Mitholz explosion, Switzerland, an underground ammunition depot partially exploded on 19 December 1947, destroying the village and killing 9. Explosives are still on site posing a risk, their removal is planned to begin in 2030 and last 10 years.
- Prüm, Germany, 15 July 1949, a French Army depot with 500 tons of ammunition explodes, 12 killed
- South Amboy powder pier explosion, New Jersey, 1950
- Explosion of RFA Bedenham, 27 April 1951 explosion of an ammunition ship in the Port of Gibraltar
- Cali explosion, 1956 explosion of seven army ammunition trucks loaded with 1053 boxes of dynamite, which were parked overnight in Cali, Colombia, approximately 1,300 killed
- La Coubre explosion, 1960 explosion of a French freighter carrying grenades and munitions, in the harbour of Havana, Cuba.
- SS Kielce, shipwreck near Folkestone containing explosives that detonated during salvage in 1967
- 1973 Roseville Yard Disaster, high-explosive aircraft ammunition and ordnance in military boxcars in a Southern Pacific train consist in its Roseville, California railyard.
- Severomorsk Disaster, 13–17 May 1984, munitions fire at a Soviet naval base, 200–300 killed
- Río Tercero explosion, Argentina, 1995

== 21st century ==
- 2002 Lagos armoury explosion, In January 2002 an ammunition depot exploded in Lagos, Nigeria, killing 1000 people and injuring 5000.
- 2007 Maputo arms depot explosion, In March 2007 an arms depot exploded in Maputo, Mozambique, killing 103 people and injuring 515.
- 2008 Gërdec explosions, Albania. U.S. and Albanian munitions experts accidentally trigger an ammunition explosion killing 26, injuring 350 and destroying hundreds of houses.
- Evangelos Florakis Naval Base explosion, Cyprus, 2011, killed 13 people (including 6 civilians).
- 2012 Brazzaville arms dump blasts, Republic of Congo killed at least 300 people. Fires spread throughout the city, destroying homes and businesses.
- 2019 Arys, Kazakhstan ammunition depot explosion: killed 2 people, injured dozens and 44,000 residents near the ammunition depot were evacuated.
- 2020 Beirut Explosion August 4, 2020, a large amount of ammonium nitrate stored at the Port of Beirut in the capital city of Lebanon exploded, causing at least 218 deaths, 7,000 injuries
- 2021 Bata explosions, Equatorial Guinea. 108 people killed, including in nearby residential areas, and damage throughout the city of Bata.
- N'Djamena ammunition depot explosions, In June 2024 an ammunition depot exploded in N'Djamena, the capital city of Chad, killing 9 people and injuring 46 others.
- SS Richard Montgomery, explosive-filled Liberty ship wreck, off the UK's Kent coast (ongoing potential)
- 2024 Toropets depot explosions, following a Ukrainian drone strike.

== See also ==
- List of ammonium nitrate disasters
- Largest artificial non-nuclear explosions
- List of accidents and disasters by death toll: Explosions
