= USS Serpens (AK-97) =

Cargo ship of the United States Navy

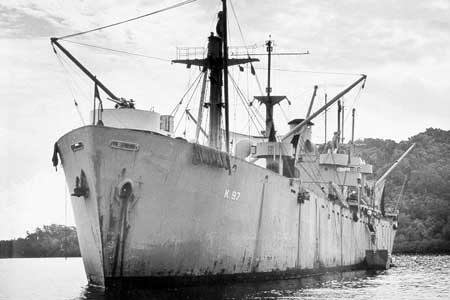
- USS Serpens (AK-97) moored pierside (date and location unknown)

History

United States
- Name: Benjamin N. Cardozo; Serpens
- Namesake: Benjamin N. Cardozo; The constellation Serpens
- Ordered: as a Type EC2-S-C1 hull, MCE hull 739
- Builder: California Shipbuilding Corporation, Terminal Island, Los Angeles, California
- Yard number: 164
- Way number: 9
- Laid down: 10 March 1943
- Launched: 5 April 1943
- Sponsored by: Mrs. H.P. Needham
- Acquired: 19 April 1943
- Commissioned: 28 May 1943
- Renamed: Serpens, 19 April 1943
- Stricken: 10 March 1945
- Identification: Hull symbol: AK-97; Code letters: NJGY
- Honors and awards: 1 × battle star
- Fate: Destroyed by explosion, 29 January 1945

General characteristics
- Class & type: Crater-class cargo ship
- Type: Type EC2-S-C1
- Displacement: 4,023 long tons (4,088 t) (standard); 14,550 long tons (14,780 t) (full load)
- Length: 441 ft 6 in (134.57 m)
- Beam: 56 ft 11 in (17.35 m)
- Draft: 28 ft 4 in (8.64 m)
- Installed power: 2 × Combustion Engineering header-type boilers, 220psi 450°; 2,500 shp (1,900 kW)
- Propulsion: 1 × General Machine Corp. vertical triple-expansion reciprocating steam engine; 1 × shaft
- Speed: 12.5 kn (23.2 km/h; 14.4 mph)
- Capacity: 7,800 t (7,700 long tons) DWT; 444,206 cu ft (12,578.5 m^{3}) (non-refrigerated)
- Complement: 19 officers 188 enlisted
- Armament: 1 × 5 in (127 mm)/38 caliber dual-purpose (DP) gun; 1 × 3 in (76 mm)/50 caliber DP gun; 2 × 40 mm (1.57 in) Bofors anti-aircraft (AA) gun mounts; 6 × 20 mm (0.79 in) Oerlikon cannon AA gun mounts

USS Serpens (AK-97) was a Crater-class cargo ship commissioned by the United States Navy for service in World War II. She was the first ship of the US Navy to have this name: she is named after Serpens, a constellation in the Northern Hemisphere. Serpens was crewed by United States Coast Guard personnel and was responsible for delivering troops, goods and equipment to locations in the Asiatic-Pacific Theater.

== Construction ==
Serpens was laid down on 10 March 1943, under a Maritime Commission (MARCOM) contract, MC hull 739, as the Liberty ship SS Benjamin N. Cardozo, by California Shipbuilding Corporation, Terminal Island, Los Angeles, California; launched on 5 April 1943; sponsored by Mrs. H.P. Needham; transferred to the Navy on 19 April 1943; renamed Serpens and designated AK-97; and commissioned at San Diego, California on 28 May 1943.

== Service history ==
Following shakedown off southern California, Serpens loaded general cargo at Alameda and, on 24 June, sailed west to assume provision ship duties in support of operations in the Solomons. By mid-July, she was in the Tonga Islands. At the end of the month, she was en route from New Caledonia to New Zealand; and, by mid-August, she had emptied her holds at Wellington. She then took on more cargo; returned to New Caledonia; and commenced a series of short hauls to Viti Levu, Tutuila, Penrhyn, Bora Bora, Aitutaki, and Tongatapu.

On 9 November, Serpens returned to New Caledonia. In early December, she moved into the southern Solomons; and, after completing a Florida Island-Banika Island run, she stood off Lunga Point, Guadalcanal, to load cargo for Bougainville. During January 1944, she completed two runs into Empress Augusta Bay. In February, she was ordered back to New Zealand for dry-docking before loading dry provisions.

For the next four months, Serpens delivered consignments to bases in the New Hebrides and the Solomons, returning to New Zealand to reload only once. In July, she was at Purvis Bay for the installation of SF-1 radar. She then resumed operations and, through October, carried general cargo and rolling stock between ports and anchorages in the Solomons. In mid-November, she loaded repairable vehicles from the Russells and from Guadalcanal and sailed for New Zealand where, after offloading, three of her holds were converted for ammunition stowage.

=== Destruction, 29 January 1945 ===
Late in December 1944, the Liberty ship commenced loading at Wellington, finished it at Auckland, and returned to the Solomons in mid-January 1945. Late in the evening on 29 January 1945, Serpens was anchored off Lunga Beach. The commanding officer and seven others, one officer and six enlisted men, were ashore. The remaining crewmen were loading depth charges into her holds when Serpens exploded. After the explosion, only the bow of the ship was visible. The rest had disintegrated, and the bow sank soon afterward. One hundred ninety-six Coast Guard crewmen, 57 Army stevedores, and a Public Health Service physician, Dr. Harry M. Levin, were killed in the explosion, and a soldier ashore was killed by fragmentation. Only two of those on board, Seaman (SN) 1/c Kelsie K. Kemp and SN 1/c George S. Kennedy, who had been in the boatswain's locker, survived.

An eyewitness to the disaster stated: "As we headed our personnel boat shoreward the sound and concussion of the explosion suddenly reached us, and, as we turned, we witnessed the awe-inspiring death drama unfold before us. As the report of screeching shells filled the air and the flash of tracers continued, the water splashed throughout the harbor as the shells hit. We headed our boat in the direction of the smoke and as we came into closer view of what had once been a ship, the water was filled only with floating debris, dead fish, torn life jackets, lumber and other unidentifiable objects. The smell of death, and fire, and gasoline, and oil was evident and nauseating. This was sudden death, and horror, unwanted and unasked for, but complete."

Lieutenant Commander Stinson reported: "I felt and saw two flashes after which only the bow of the ship was visible. The rest had disintegrated and the bow sank soon afterwards." The two survivors, SN 1/c Kemp and SN 1/c Kennedy, according to Stinson, ". . .showed a lot of savvy by grabbing a couple of water lights that we kept stowed in the [boatswain's] locker. They used them to attract attention when they climbed out onto the floating portion of the bow." Both men were injured but were rescued by a base commander in the area.

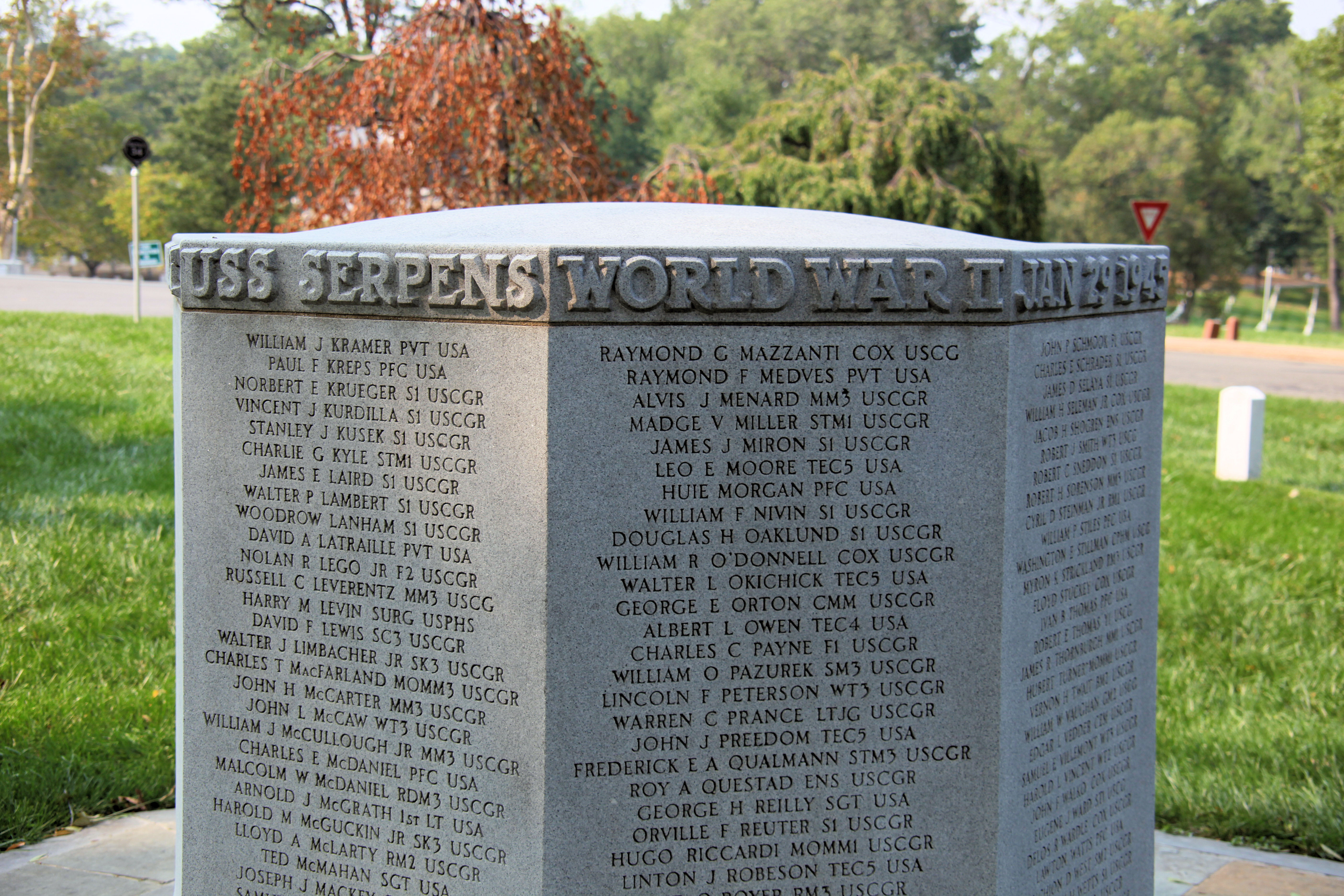
Memorial to the dead of USS Serpens at Arlington National Cemetery.

At first report the incident was attributed to enemy action but a court of inquiry later determined that the cause of the explosion could not be established from the remaining evidence and by 1949, the Navy noted that the loss was not due to enemy action but due to an "accident intrinsic to the loading process." The loss of Serpens remains the largest single disaster ever suffered by the Coast Guard. The dead were initially buried at the Army, Navy and Marine Corps Cemetery at Guadalcanal. Their remains were later exhumed and taken to Arlington National Cemetery where they were interred on 15 June 1949. A large monument in their honor was erected over the grave site and dedicated on 16 November 1950.

As of 2019, there is an active effort to reexamine the sinking to see if it was caused by a Japanese submarine.

The wreck is located at: 9°24′37″S 160°0′40″E

== Awards ==
Serpens earned one battle star for her World War II service.

== See also ==
- West Loch disaster
- USS Mount Hood (AE-11)
- Port Chicago disaster
- List of accidents and incidents involving transport or storage of ammunition

== Notes ==
Citations

== Bibliography ==
Online resources

- "Serpens I (AK-97)". Dictionary of American Naval Fighting Ships. Naval History and Heritage Command. 9 September 2015. This article incorporates text from this source, which is in the public domain.
- "California Shipbuilding, Los Angeles CA". www.ShipbuildingHistory.com. 13 October 2010.
- "USS Serpens (AK-97)". NavSource. 12 December 2014.
- "Wreck of USS Serpens (AK-97)". Wikimapia.
- "USS Serpens, AK-97". United States Coast Guard. 21 December 2016. This article incorporates text from this source, which is in the public domain.
