= South Amboy powder pier explosion =

Munitions explosion in South Amboy, New Jersey, in 1950

Coordinates: 40.48695°N 74.27441°W

The South Amboy powder pier explosion was an incident that took place on Friday, May 19, 1950. Over 420 tons of explosives in transit at the Raritan River Port in South Amboy, New Jersey detonated due to unknown causes, killing 31 and injuring over 350.

== Background ==
The South Amboy terminal was, at the time, the only terminal of the Port of New York and New Jersey that allowed the unloading of large quantities of commercial explosives from freight cars. However, shipments over 125,000 pounds were restricted.

In 1950, the government of Pakistan contracted National Carloading Corporation to oversee the transit of 9,000 boxes of anti-personnel mines and anti-tank mines, produced by the Kilgore Manufacturing Company of Newark, Ohio and purchased by Pakistan, to Karachi. They were to arrive at South Amboy on Pennsylvania Railroad railcars, and would be loaded on the Isbrandtsen-owned steamship Flying Clipper bound for Karachi. This shipment was later joined by 1,800 boxes of gelignite, produced by Hercules Powder Co., destined for commercial sale in Afghanistan. The combined shipment weighed a total of 300,000 pounds, and James Healing Co., the company hired by National Carloading Corporation for lightering, sought permissions from the United States Coast Guard to temporarily lift the 125,000 pounds restriction. On May 18, they received written and verbal permission from the Coast Guard.

By May 19, the shipments had arrived at the port via railcars, and were being loaded onto four barges at pier 4, the "explosive anchorage" or "powder pier", of Pennsylvania Railroad, located at the foot of Augusta Street.

== Explosion ==
At approximately 7:26 pm EDT, while being transferred on the barges, 150 tons of the explosives detonated, triggering a chain reaction that caused the explosion of a total of over 420 tons of explosives. The explosion could be felt up to 30 miles (48 km) away.

At 7:50 pm, South Amboy mayor John Leonard declared a state of emergency in South Amboy. He requested help from Governor of New Jersey Alfred E. Driscoll, who sent New Jersey State Police and military assistance. Red Cross disaster units, fire departments, first aid squads and volunteers from neighboring towns joined the rescue effort.

26 employees of the lighterage company and 5 coal barge captains were killed in the explosion, leading to a total casualty count of 31. Only 5 bodies were identified, and many of the bodies were never recovered. Over 350 were injured. The explosion destroyed the four barges, the railcars, the powder pier and adjacent piers. At least 17 other barges in the pier were set on fire or sunk. Almost all of South Amboy's 2,700 homes and buildings suffered some degree of damage. The power grid of the city was also destroyed, causing a blackout. Total property damage was estimated to be over $10 million.

On July 17, 1951, the New Jersey Legislature passed a bill to officially declare the 31 casualties, including those whose bodies were never found, to be dead so that death certificates could be issued. The 31 casualties named in the bill were:

Name	Address
Joseph Santon	Harriet Avenue, Bergenfield, New Jersey
William Healing	340 Herrick Avenue, Teaneck, New Jersey
Vincent Baducha	Nicholas Avenue, Port Richmond, Staten Island, New York
William Collyer	52 Pearl Street, Oceanside, New York
Hugh O'Neil	233 East 176th Street, Bronx, New York
James Hart	Leroy Place and Scudder Avenue, Copiague, New York
Harold Craig	279 91st Street, Brooklyn, New York
Edward Havlicik	4401 69th Street, Woodside, New York
Eugene Healing	2600 Hudson Boulevard, Jersey City, New Jersey
James Reilly	15 Baldwin Street, Jersey City, New Jersey
Chester Campbell	2554 Hudson Boulevard, Jersey City, New Jersey
William Harrison	3000 Montgomery Avenue, Jersey City, New Jersey
John Keuritsky (or Krienski)	260 Duncan Avenue, Jersey City, New Jersey
Robert Whitcomb (body found)	473 North Warren Avenue, Brockton, Massachusetts
Henry Jacobosky (body found)	196 Broadway, Brooklyn, New York
James Burnes	Master of and resided aboard the barge Robert Hedger of the Anthony O'Boyle Company, sunk in explosion
Michael Walla	250 Van Pelt Street, Manor Harbor, Staten Island, New York
Frank Healing	166 Clendenny Avenue, Jersey City, New Jersey
George Ackerly	427 Jersey Avenue, Jersey City, New Jersey
Raymond Ackerly	90 Bright Street, Jersey City, New Jersey
B.J. Arne Hausvik	727 57th Street, Brooklyn, New York
Frank Boncek	276 Sumpter Street, Brooklyn, New York
Ben Walling	346 40th Street, Brooklyn, New York
John Rinn	313 9th Street, Jersey City, New Jersey
Frank J. Rinn	243 Grand Street, Jersey City, New Jersey
Charles Lynch	208 Freeman Avenue, Jersey City, New Jersey
Frank Cinelli	3 Warner Avenue, Jersey City, New Jersey
Walter Sullivan (body found)	203 Madison Street, Hoboken, New Jersey
Maxine Forbes	822 Jewett Avenue, Staten Island, New York
Syvert Hagen (body found)	214 Carroll Street, Brooklyn, New York
Dade White (body found)	c/o Burns Coal Company, New York, New York (or 116 East 108th Street, New York, New York)

== Legacy ==
In 1953, the United States Army performed a three-day search of the area, removing 62 live mines dispersed by the explosion in the harbor area.

Kilgore Manufacturing Company became the target of a congressional investigation, and was charged with 9,000 counts of munitions violations. The hearings revealed that the company had packed detonating fuses in the same case as the explosives, violating regulations set out by the Interstate Commerce Commission. The decision of the Coast Guard to temporarily lift restrictions were also criticized in the hearings, by Mayor Leonard and former Governor Harold G. Hoffman.

In 2013, a plaque was installed at the site to commemorate the disaster.

== See also ==
- T. A. Gillespie Company Shell Loading Plant explosion, a 1918 munitions explosion in neighboring Sayreville, New Jersey
- List of accidents and incidents involving transport or storage of ammunition
