= Kingsland explosion =

1917 munitions factory explosion in New Jersey, US

Coordinates: 40.7993°N 74.1162°W

- Part of World War One
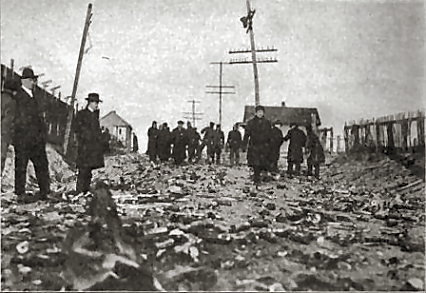
- A view of a section of the Canadian Car and Foundry Company's Plant, Kingsland, New Jersey, after the fire and explosions of January 11, 1917 (International Film Service, Inc.)
- Location: Lyndhurst, New Jersey, U.S.
- Date: January 11, 1917
- Attack type: Sabotage
- Deaths: 0
- Injuries: 0
- Perpetrator: Imperial German agents
- Motive: Deny munitions to Allied powers

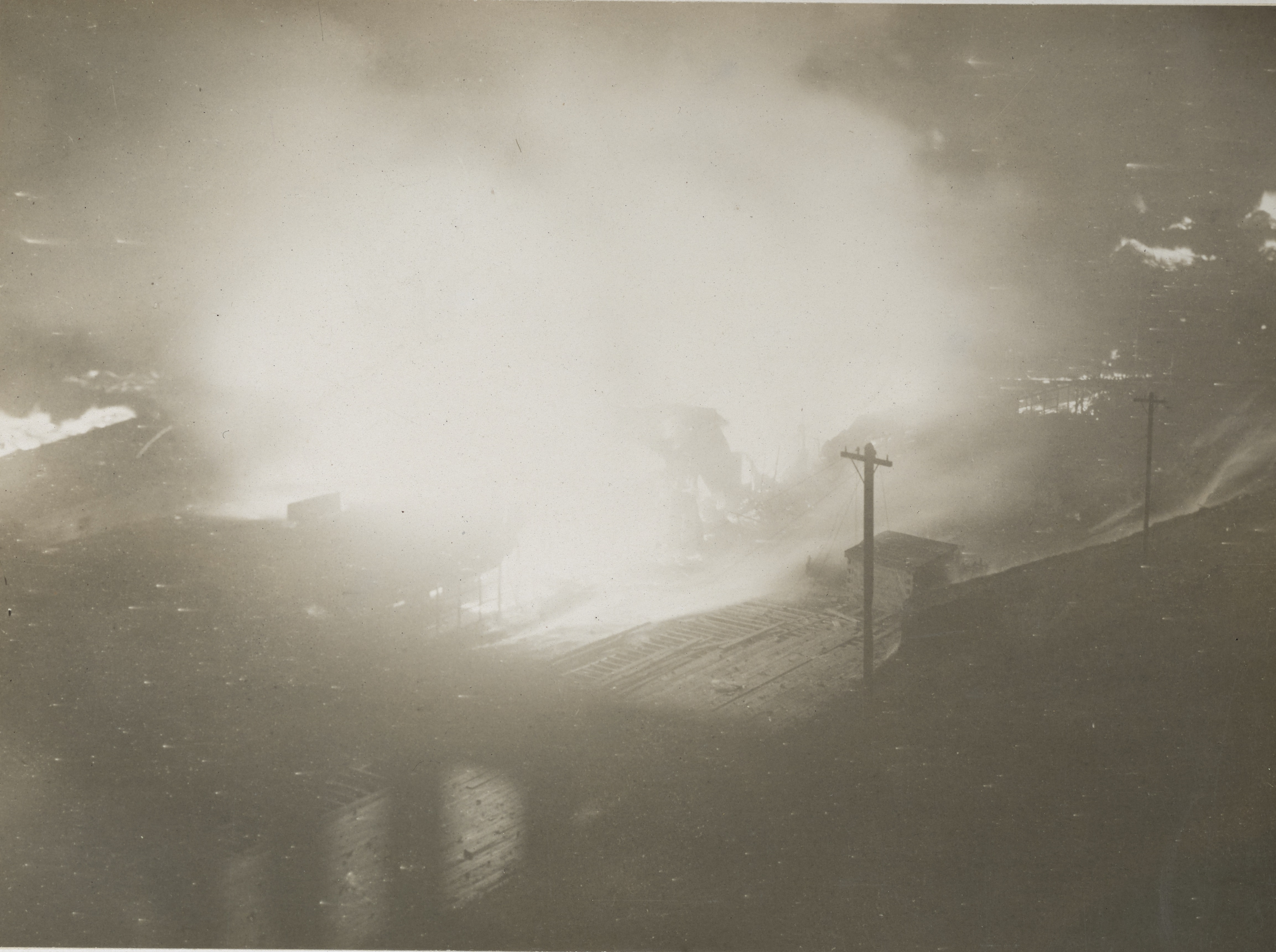
Flaming buildings of the Canadian Car & Foundry Co., Kingsland, New Jersey

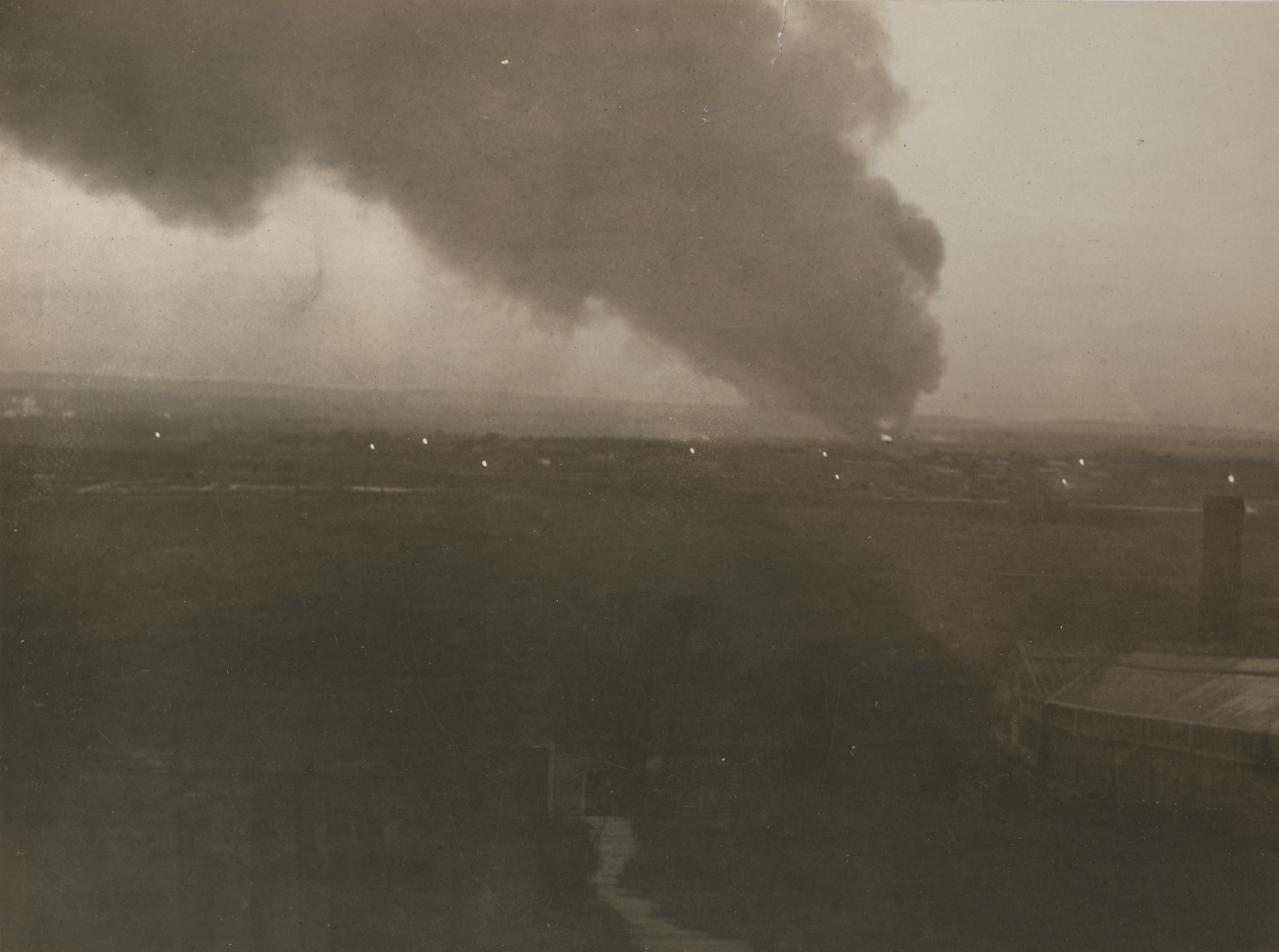
Smoke in the distance from the Canadian Car & Foundry Co., Kingsland, New Jersey

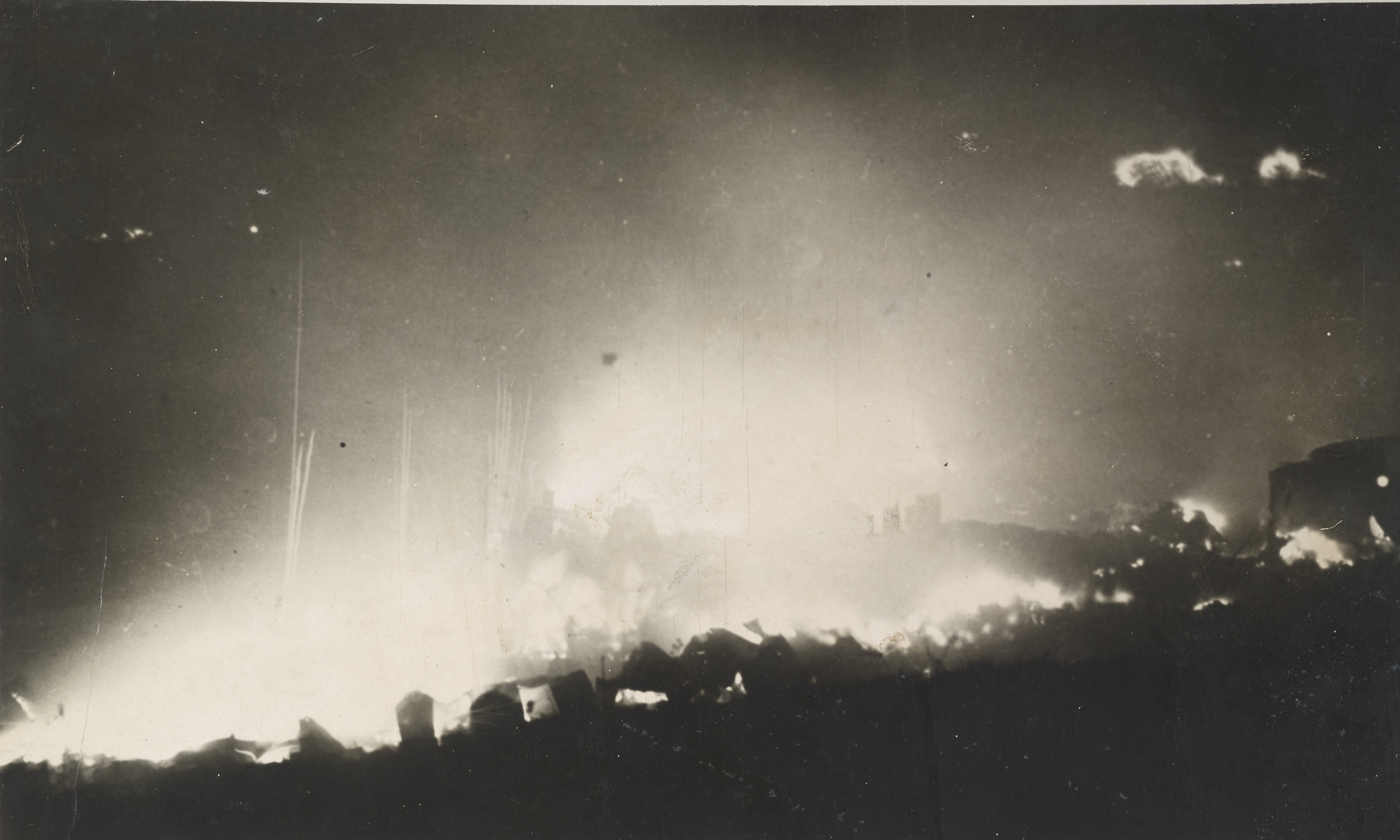
Trees and telephone poles were cut down by flying shells

The Kingsland explosion was an incident that took place during World War I at a munitions factory in Lyndhurst, New Jersey, U.S., on January 11, 1917. An arbitration commission in 1931 determined that, "In the Kingsland Case the Commission finds upon the evidence that the fire was not caused by any German agent." However, decades later, Germany paid damages to American claimants.

The Canadian Car and Foundry Company, based in Montreal, had signed large contracts with Russia and Britain for delivery of ammunition. An enormous factory was constructed in the New Jersey Meadowlands, which was then referred to as Kingsland. The company executives decided not to take any chances with security for their plant. They constructed a 6-foot-high (1.8 m) fence around the plant and hired security guards to conduct 24-hour patrols around the perimeter and screen each worker as they entered the plant. It was located on the site of Lyndhurst's present industrial park. A brick stack, believed to be the remaining part of the Foundry, is located in the area bounded by Valley Brook Avenue, Polito Avenue, and the office buildings on Wall Street West.

On January 11, 1917, a fire started in Building 30 of the Canadian Car and Foundry Company at Kingsland in Bergen County, New Jersey. In four hours, probably 500,000 pieces of 3-inch (76 mm) explosive shells were discharged. The entire plant was destroyed. It was said to have been a spectacle more magnificent than the nearby 1916 explosion at Black Tom. From office buildings and tall apartments, people in New York City watched with amazement.

== The building ==
In March 1916, World War I was in progress. Although the United States was neutral in the conflict at that time, the country was selling war supplies to the Allied powers due to the British blockade of Germany, meaning that the Allies were the only potential customers. Munitions, including shells, shell cases, shrapnel, and powder were shipped to Kingsland from over 100 different factories. At the foundry they were assembled for shipment to Russia. Producing three million shells per month, the factory was a worthy objective for German saboteurs.

Building 30 was used exclusively for cleaning out shells; it contained 48 workbenches. On the bench in front of each employee was a pan of gasoline and a small rotating machine operated by a belt. The cleaning process included several steps:

- The shells were dusted with a brush
- A cloth, moistened in the pan of gasoline, was wrapped around a foot-long piece of wood
- The shell was placed in the rotating machine and the wood was inserted into the shell as it turned
- A dry cloth was wrapped around the stick and the shell was dried in a similar manner.

== The suspected sabotage ==
Rumor had it that a group of saboteurs operated under the direction of Frederick Hinsch. He recruited a German national, Curt Thummel, who changed his name to Charles Thorne. Hinsch instructed Thorne to obtain employment at the factory. Thorne was hired as assistant employment manager. In this position he facilitated the hiring of several operatives sent by Hinsch to infiltrate the factory. One of those employees supposedly was Theodore Wozniak.

After the Kingsland plant was completely destroyed, police and federal investigators uncovered the source of the fire. It started at Wozniak's workbench in Building 30.

Other workmen alleged that the fire began in front of Wozniak's wooden roller. One of the company directors, Mr. Cahan, remarked about Wozniak's nervous behavior and contradictions during an interview about the incident. Wozniak, who admitted that he had served time as a draftee in the Austrian Army, was told by Mr. Cahan that he would be needed in New York as part of the investigation into the fire. Wozniak, who lived at the Russian Immigrant House on Third Street in New York City, eluded the detectives who were watching him and disappeared.

== The heroine ==
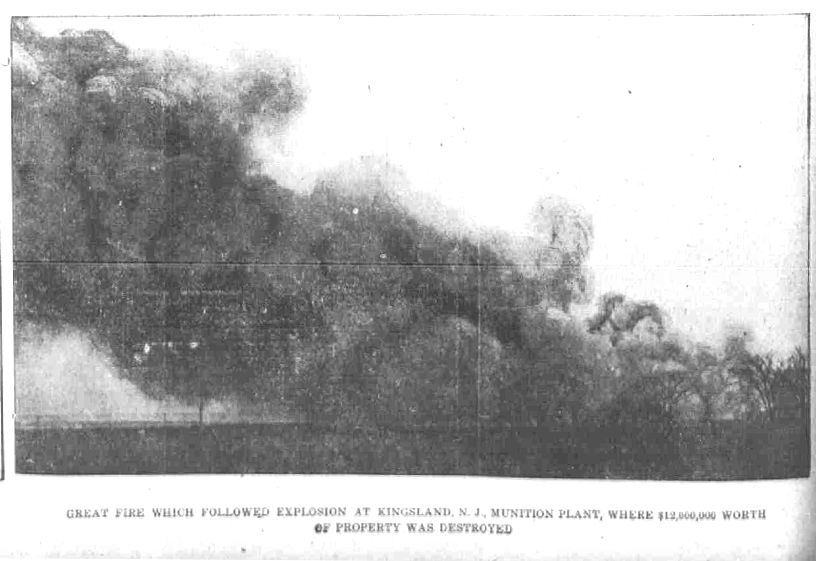
Newspaper photo showing the fire that happened after the explosion.

Kingsland resident Theresa Louise "Tessie" McNamara, who operated the company switchboard, was credited with saving 1,400 lives; despite the fire McNamara stayed at the switchboard. She plugged in each of the buildings and shouted the warning, "Get out or go up!" No one was killed in the fire as a result of her announcements. Fleeing workers were able to cross the frozen Hackensack River or run up Valley Brook Avenue to safety. Some of those who crossed the Hackensack River made their way to the buildings on Snake Hill.

The National Special Aid Society later presented McNamara with a check to honor her for her bravery.

The Lyndhurst Historical Society has created a vest pocket park dedicated to McNamara's memory. The park is located on Clay Avenue, between Valley Brook Avenue and Wall Street West. The brick stack can be seen from this park.

== Newspaper account ==
“Whatever happened, the building was in flames in an instant. Ten minutes passed before the first and mightiest explosion. In those ten minutes panic broke loose in the plant. It is believed that there were 1,400 men working in the factory. Each of these realized what would happen if fire caught hold of any of a dozen isolated buildings.”

“They started to get out. The entrance to the building was by a narrow gate, guarded by 12-foot walls. In a moment this was jammed by workers, mostly Italians and negroes, who fought desperately to get away. Guards were forced at last to drive back the mob with pistols and rifles.” “They broke and scattered. Many of them run to the rear of the plant, which is separated from the swampy meadow by a high barbed-wire fence. They went through this like a drove of cattle. Frantic with terror, they paid no attention to the wire, which cut some of them cruelly, but went ploughing, the whole terror-struck crowd, through the mud and thin ice of the marsh. Many of them who reached solid ground and safety were plastered with slime from head to heel. Many more were soaked with icy water.”

“Then came the first great roar. It is said that a building in which the loaded shells were stored was the first to go.”

“The terrific blast spread the panic, which had hitherto been confined to the factory yard, to Kingsland and the adjoining village of Lyndhurst. After the first detonation came the steady roll of bursting shrapnel and high explosive shells. In a minute the little Jersey towns were transformed into villages upon the European battle front. Shells that had been intended for the armies of the Czar burst in terrific salvos over the roofs of the houses, shattered chimneys, riddled the car repair barns of the Lackawanna Railway, and set two dwellings on fire.”

Two miles of the Delaware, Lackawanna, and Western Railroad tracks were torn up by the explosions. Commuters from New York City were delayed by up to four hours and at one point 40,000 were jammed into the Hoboken station in a "clamoring, close-packed mass." Express trains to and from Washington D.C. were disrupted and a comical dispute over rights to a diner car ensued. Dairy and produce shipments to New York City were delayed by 24 hours as well.

== Terror ruled Snake Hill ==
There were Hudson County penal and charitable institutions at Snake Hill, in Secaucus. The Almshouse, Penitentiary, and Hospital for the Insane, Contagious Diseases Hospital, and Tuberculosis Sanitarium, were all grouped on the north side of Snake Hill. When the fire and ensuing explosions started, the residents of Snake Hill began to panic, fearing the world was coming to an end. From the windows they could see what the warden later described as a big display of fireworks. As the 900+ inmates of the asylum grew more panicked, the superintendent, Dr. George W. King, and Dr. James Meehan, chairman of the Hospital committee figured a way to calm the residents. Dr. Meehan hurried to the hospital with supplies of ice cream, fruits and candies. The inmates were assembled in the lecture hall and they were told that the European War had ended and the explosions were detonations of big guns to celebrate the event.

== Aftermath ==
A reparations case was launched by John J. McCloy against Germany in 1934, which dragged on for many years and was finally settled in the 1950s. Germany never admitted guilt, but paid $50 million during 1953–1979 to settle claims arising from the 1917 Kingsland explosion and the 1916 Black Tom explosion.

== See also ==
- Morgan Depot Explosion (1918)
- List of accidents and incidents involving transport or storage of ammunition
