= Pencil detonator =

Time fuze used by British Special forces

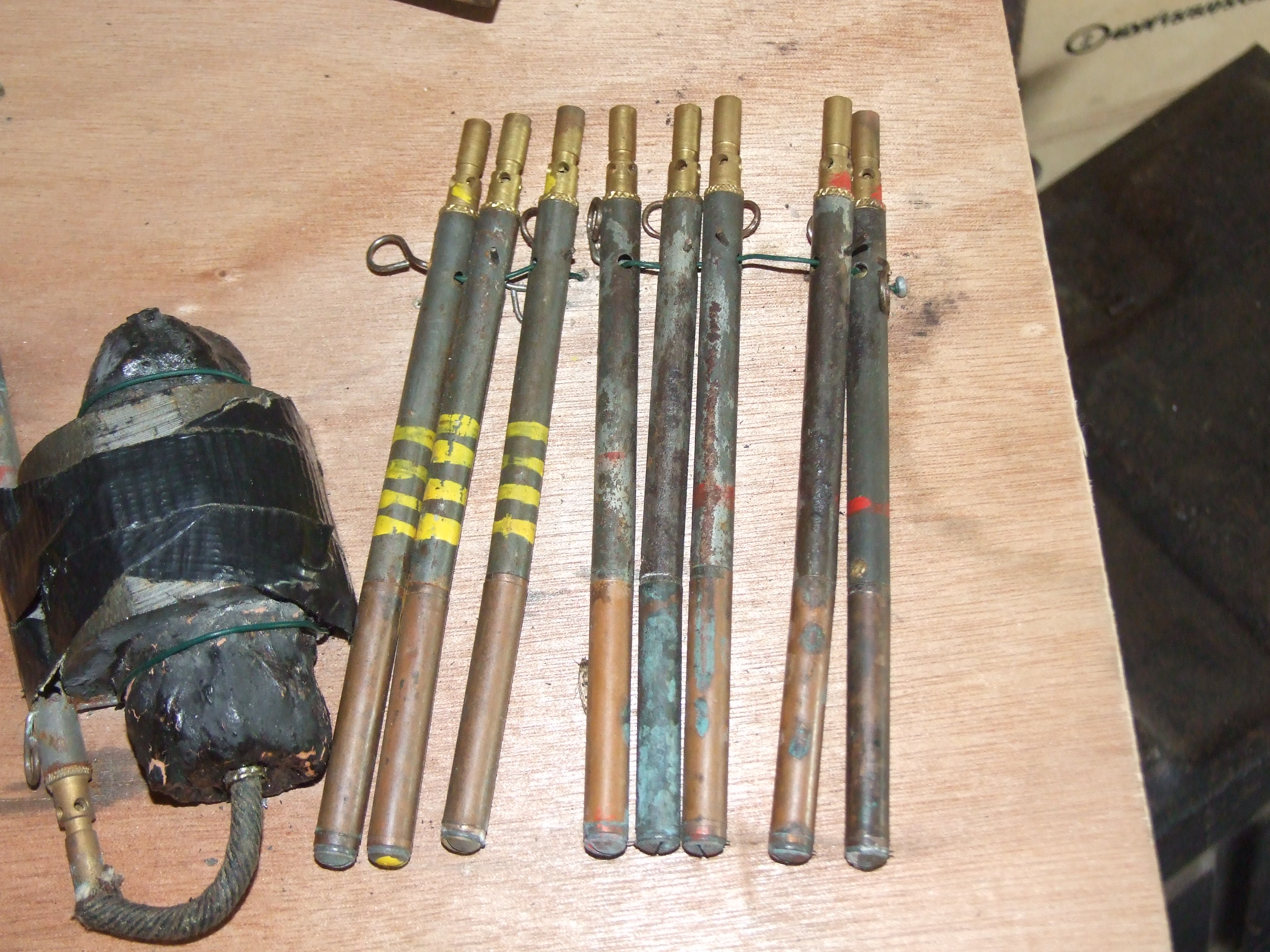
An array of World War 2 pencil detonators displayed at the Museum of the British Resistance Organisation at the Parham Airfield Museum, 2007

A pencil detonator or time pencil is a time fuze designed to be connected to a detonator or short length of safety fuse. They are about the same size and shape as a pencil, hence the name. They were introduced during World War II and developed at Aston House, Hertfordshire, UK.

== Types ==
=== Number Ten delay switch ===
Cutaway diagram of a No. 10 delay switch

One type, the British Number Ten Delay Switch (official name, "Switch, No. 10, Delay" and often referred to as a "timing pencil"), was made of a brass (or in later versions aluminium) tube, with a copper section at one end which contained a glass vial of cupric chloride (the liquid was widely and erroneously reported to be sulfuric acid), while beneath the vial was a spring-loaded striker under tension and held in place by a thin metal wire. The timer was started by crushing the copper section of the tube to break the vial of cupric chloride, which then began to slowly erode the wire holding back the striker. When the wire eventually parted, the striker was propelled down the hollow centre of the detonator, hitting the percussion cap at the other end of the detonator.

Number ten delay switches had delays ranging from 10 minutes to 24 hours and were accurate to within plus or minus two or three minutes in an hour's delay, and plus or minus an hour in a 12-hour delay, though environmental conditions could affect this. The switches were typically issued in packs of five, all the switches in a pack having the same delay. In use, two switches with the same delay (from different packs if possible) would be placed in the explosive charge in case one switch failed.

=== Using a No. 10 delay switch ===
1. Insert the detonator or safety fuze in the spring snout;
2. Crush the ampoule containing the liquid, by squeezing the copper tube;
3. Shake the pencil to ensure that the liquid is in good contact with the steel wire;
4. Remove the safety strip.

=== L-Delay ("No. 9 delay switch") ===
Another, subsequent type was developed by Millis Jefferis of MD1 known as the "Lead Delay switch" or officially "Switch, No. 9, L Delay". Instead of relying on the chemical action of a corrosive liquid on metal (which was subject to temperature variation), it used a piece of metal under stress – the metal in question being a lead alloy that was extremely affected by mechanical creep. A piece of this lead was notched to a set diameter, the diameter setting the time delay. When the starting pin was removed, this wire was placed under tension by the spring-loaded striker, and began to gradually stretch. After a certain time, it would snap at the notch and allow the striker to hit the percussion cap.

The delay could be set from a matter of minutes to hours. Manufacture was entirely by MD1. Generally speaking L-delays were slightly less reliable and had shorter delays, but were more reliable underwater (if a No. 10 fuze developed a leak, water would dilute the corrosive liquid and increase the delay or stop the fuze from working).

=== Percussion igniter ===
Another type of time pencil had a percussion cap but no detonator attached. Instead there was a crimping attachment at one end to allow pyrotechnic fuse to be crimped on. When a time pencil of this type fired, it would light the fuse which would burn towards a detonator crimped onto the other end. Because standard safety fuse burns at around half a metre per minute, it is not practicable to provide delays of more than a few minutes in this way. It was also possible to connect a pencil detonator to so-called "instantaneous fuse" (not to be confused with detonating cord) which had an unusually fast burn rate of over 7 metres per second.

== Characteristics ==
Pencil detonators are colour-coded to indicate the nominal time delay, which can range from 10 minutes through to 24 hours. No. 10 delays were normally issued in a tin of 5, all of the same delay, while L-delays were issued in a larger tin which included a mixture of different delays to suit a variety of operations. The time delay of a No. 10 varies according to the concentration of the corrosive liquid in the vial. It is widely reported that the wire thickness varied also, but in fact all used the same diameter of wire. The time delay of a No. 9 is determined solely by the thickness of the notch in the wire, the spring tension, and the temperature. Pencil detonators could be used with any explosive provided a suitable booster was attached. However, plastic explosives (which did not require a booster) were particularly useful during the sabotage missions in which they were often employed. There were also a number of special charges issued with a time pencil already incorporated e.g. some types of limpet mines.

After being activated a pencil detonator is silent in operation. It does not fizz or make any other noise. However, unlike clockwork timers, pencil detonators only give approximate time delays. For example, a 2-hour pencil detonator might be accurate to plus or minus 5 minutes, whereas the version offering a 6-hour delay could have a precision of plus or minus 15 minutes. Both No. 9 and No. 10 delays were also significantly affected by the ambient temperature, and were issued along with a chart of temperature corrections—but no thermometer. For example, a pencil detonator designed to fire 24 hours after being activated could in reality give a 30-hour delay - if the weather was very cold. Similarly, during hot weather pencil detonators designed to fire after a 12-hour delay could in reality trigger detonation within 10 hours. The main virtue of pencil detonators is their small size and light weight, plus the fact that they are very quick and easy to use. These are important points during covert operations.

Boxes of No. 10 delay switches
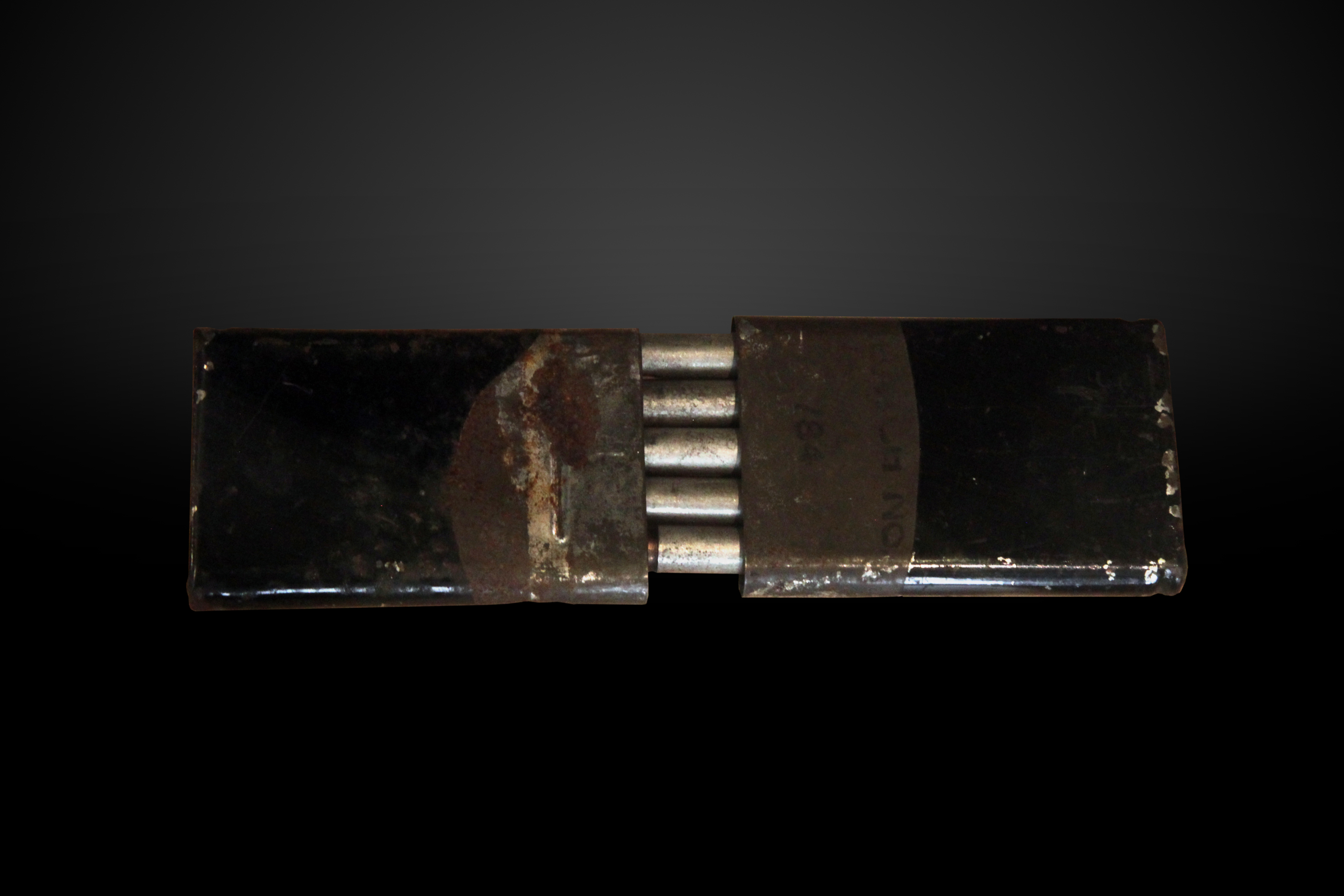

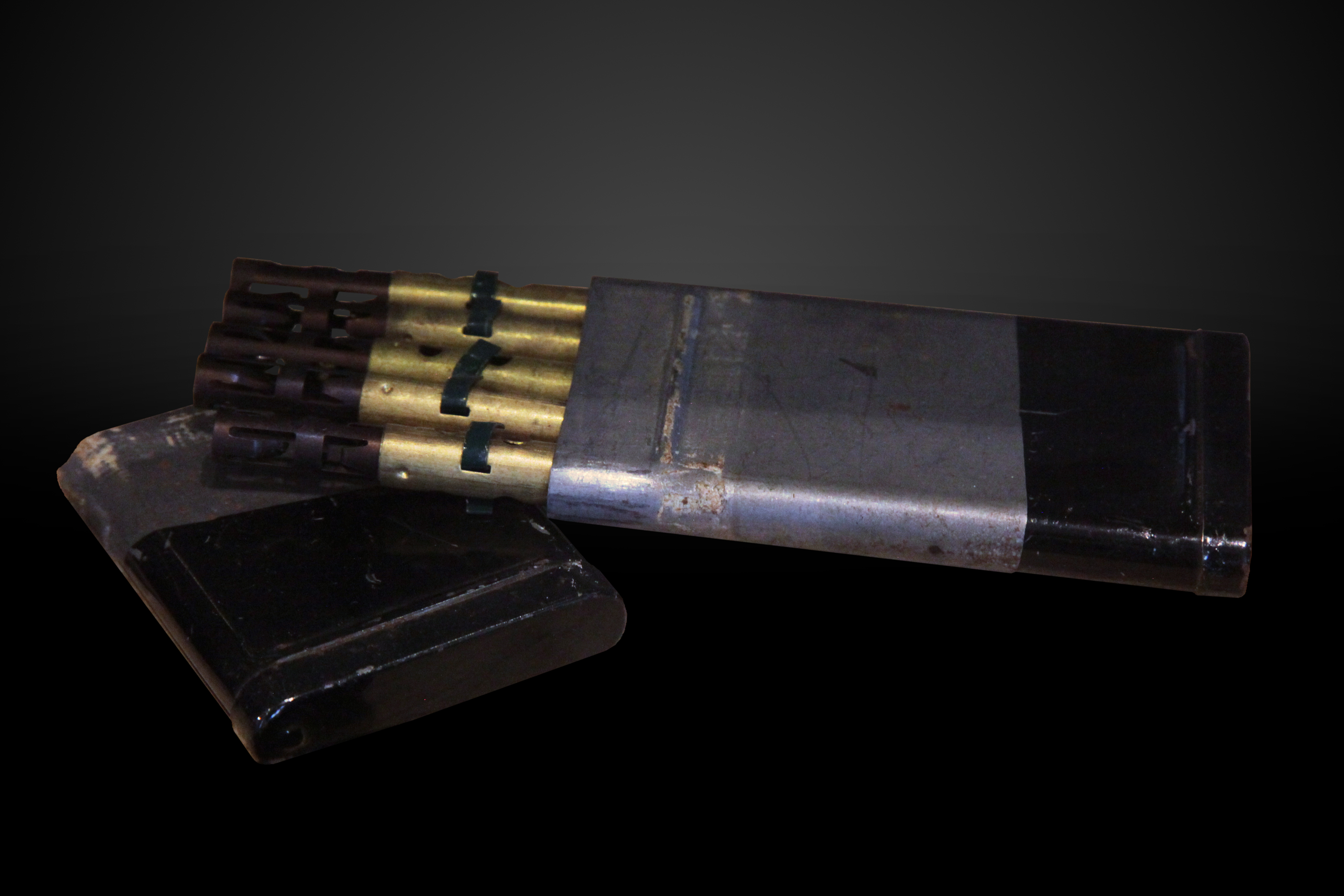

== Usage ==
For very high-value targets it is recommended that two pencil detonators from different batches be used together. That way if one detonator fails the other will almost surely blow the charge. Note that if both detonators were going to work, the explosion will occur at the earlier of the two times; thus this method will also slightly reduce the average delay.

Pencil detonators saw heavy use during the Second World War by the Special Air Service, Special Operations Executive and groups such as the French Resistance. A number of pencil detonators were used to detonate the massive amatol charge hidden inside HMS Campbeltown during the St Nazaire Raid of 1942. The ship exploded over an hour later than anticipated.

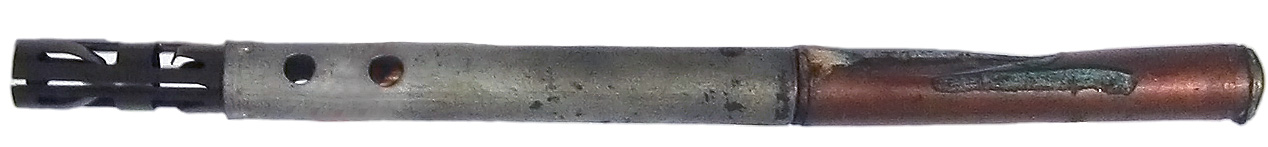
Pencil detonator used in the July 20 plot in 1944 exhibited in Bundeswehr Military History Museum in Dresden (Germany)

The briefcase bomb used in the July 20 plot used a captured British pencil detonator inserted into a block of British plastic explosives weighing approximately two pounds. The bomb was set to 30 minutes and detonated as planned, but Hitler survived with minor injuries. Stauffenberg could not prepare the second block, though. He got rid of it while driving through the forest to the airfield. His driver, Leutnant Erich Kretz, reported seeing Werner von Haeften throw something into the woods in his mirror.

Approximately 12 million pencil detonators were produced in Britain during the war. However, in recent years they have been superseded by electronic timers which are more accurate and provide much longer delay times.

== Cultural references ==
Time pencils figure in the 1961 war movie The Guns of Navarone when an undercover explosives expert, portrayed by David Niven, finds that his stock has been rendered inoperative. Their use is also highlighted in the film Valkyrie during a part of the film detailing the July 20 plot.

== See also ==
- Blasting cap
- Exploding-bridgewire detonator
- Slapper detonator
- Primacord
- Pencil bomb
