= Lothar Witzke =

German spy (1895–1962)

- Born: May 15, 1895; Kreis Koschmin, Kingdom of Prussia, German Empire
- Died: January 6, 1962 (aged 66); Hamburg, West Germany
- Resting place: Friedhof Hamburg-Ohlsdorf 0030
- Known for: Black Tom Explosion
- Political party: German Party
- Status: Deceased
- Conviction: Espionage
- Penalty: Death; commuted to life imprisonment
- Military career
- Allegiance: German Empire
- Branch: Imperial German Navy, Abwehr
- Service years: c. 1912-
- Rank: Lieutenant
- Conflicts: First World War: Battle of Más a Tierra; Second World War
- Awards: Iron Cross (first and second class)

Lothar Witzke (May 15, 1895 – January 6, 1962) was a junior officer in the German Imperial Navy, who, after escaping from internment in neutral Chile, became an Officer of Naval Intelligence spy and saboteur on active service in the United States and Mexico during the First World War.

Arrested in 1918, Witzke was sentenced to death, but his life was saved by the Armistice of 11 November 1918. In 1923, he was pardoned and released. During the Second World War he served in the Abwehr.

== Naval career ==
Born in Kreis Koschmin, in the Province of Posen, Witzke was educated at Posen Academy and then entered the German Naval Academy as a seventeen-year-old cadet. By the beginning of the First World War he was a lieutenant in the Imperial German Navy on the light cruiser SMS Dresden. After many months of excitement, during which the Dresden played havoc with Allied shipping and hid from British warships, she was eventually caught and sunk. Witzke's leg was broken in the action. Together with other survivors of the crew, he was interned in Valparaíso, Chile.

== Sabotage activities ==
Early in 1916 Witzke escaped; and under an assumed name he succeeded in reaching San Francisco in May 1916 as a merchant seaman on board the SS Calusa. In California he reported to Franz Bopp, the German Consul General, who put him in touch with another saboteur, Kurt Jahnke, based in Mexico City. At this time the American law enforcement knew nothing of Jahnke's and Witzke's surreptitious activities. Both showed special aptitude for secret service work and were of a caliber far superior to Bopp's other agents. So cleverly did they cover their tracks that they were never even suspected during the period of US neutrality.

In addition to their work on the West Coast, Witzke and Jahnke made frequent trips east on sabotage missions. After Bopp was arrested, they gradually shifted their operations to the industrial Eastern seaboard. Double agents of the U.S. Military Intelligence Corps connected Witzke to the munitions explosion of July 1917 at the Mare Island Naval Shipyard in Vallejo, California. His involvement in the Black Tom explosion in the New York Harbor is subject of an ongoing debate

== Imprisonment ==
After U.S. military intelligence lured him into returning to the United States, Witzke was arrested at the Mexican border at 10 a.m. on February 1, 1918, near Nogales, Arizona. He claimed to be a Russian-American, "Pablo Waberski", returning to San Francisco. A 424-letter cryptogram was found sewn into the left upper sleeve of his jacket. Several months later this cryptogram was broken by John Matthews Manly, who worked with Herbert Yardley at the fledgling MI-8 and identified the bearer to the "Imperial Consular Authorities of the Republic of Mexico". Witzke was convicted by a military tribunal at Fort Sam Houston and sentenced to death. Twice he attempted to escape and once got out, but he was recaptured the same day emerging from a Mexican shack. On his return, a razor blade was found in his cell, and since suicide was feared, his top clothes were removed. On November 2, 1918, his sentence was approved by the Department Commander. However, with the Armistice of 11 November 1918 putting an effective end to the war, the death sentence was not carried out.

On May 27, 1920, President Woodrow Wilson commuted Witzke's death sentence to life imprisonment, and he was transferred to Leavenworth Prison. Meanwhile, the Foreign Office of the Weimar Republic was exerting great pressure for his release. On April 30, 1923, the German Ambassador asked for Witzke's release on the grounds that other countries, including Germany, had released all POWs, including spies. At the same time, a prison report showed that Witzke had heroically prevented a disaster by entering the prison boiler room after an explosion. On that basis, Witzke was pardoned by President Calvin Coolidge, released on September 26, 1923, and deported to Berlin.

On his arrival in the Weimar Republic, Lieutenant Witzke was decorated by the Reichswehr with the Iron Cross, First and Second Class. He later joined the Abwehr. After the Second World War, Witzke lived in Hamburg.

== Other people ==
- Lothar Witzke (1903–1998) was a German composer (short bio in German).

== See also ==
- List of people pardoned or granted clemency by the president of the United States

== Literature ==
- The Reader of Gentleman's Mail: Herbert O. Yardley and the Birth of American Codebreaking, David Kahn, Yale University Press, 2006 (ISBN 978-0300098464)
- Agent of the Iron Cross: The Race to Capture German Saboteur-Assassin Lothar Witzke during World War I, Bill Mills, Rowman & Littlefield, 2024 (ISBN 978-1538182086)
