= Field agent =

Type of spy

In espionage, a field agent or field operative is an agent who works in the field as opposed to one who operates at the office or headquarters. A field agent can work alone or in a group but usually has a case officer who is in charge.

Field agents can be undercover, and travel using fake passports that may be under the name of a front organization or shell corporation.

Field agents are often present in fiction, though their duties and actions can be quite different in reality.

== See also ==
- Espionage
- Agent handling
- Double agent
- Special agent
- Non-official cover (NOC)
