= Nachrichten-Abteilung =

German naval intelligence (1901–1919)

The Nachrichten-Abteilung, also known as N, was the naval intelligence department of the German Imperial Admiralty Staff or Admiralstab between 1901 and 1919. It focused its efforts on France, the United States and above all the United Kingdom, whose Royal Navy was Germany's principal rival for naval supremacy. Although it was able to recruit a worldwide network of agents, drawing on the resources of German shipping companies and the German diplomatic service, the organisation's effectiveness was limited by rivalries within the Imperial German Navy and competition with the Imperial German Army's intelligence department. Its activities had little practical impact on the course of the First World War and it was dissolved in 1919 after Germany's defeat in the war.

== Establishment ==
After the Admiralstab was established in 1899, its chief, Vice-Admiral Otto von Diederichs, sought to establish a naval intelligence department. He petitioned Kaiser Wilhelm II in January 1900 to approve the project. Although the Kaiser approved, Diederichs' plans were blocked by Admiral Alfred von Tirpitz of the German Imperial Naval Office, with whom he had previously clashed over plans to expand the authority of the Admiralstab. Tirpitz simply declined to answer Diederichs' request for funds, prompting the latter to approach the Kaiser again in January 1901.

Diederichs presented a memorandum arguing that without an intelligence staff it would be impossible for the navy to develop contingency plans for war. It needed to focus on Germany's most likely naval enemies – France, the United Kingdom and the United States – but currently had only limited means for gathering intelligence, including reviewing newspaper reports and utilising naval attachés as a source of information. The navy needed to have its own dedicated intelligence staff, modelled on the German Army's Abteilung IIIb. Diederichs asked for four staff to man the new department; one staff officer to serve as its head, with one lieutenant commander as assistant; one more officer off active duty to carry out confidential work such as couriering correspondence and paying agents; and a cartographer who could double as a photographer. It would need an annual budget of 150,000 marks a year.

The Kaiser again approved the proposal and directed the Naval Office to implement it, but Tirpitz continued to obstruct Diederichs – this time by reducing his budget from the requested 150,000 marks to only 10,000. Nonetheless this was enough to establish the new department at the Admiralstab's headquarters at 70 Königgrätzer Straße (today's Stresemannstraße) in Berlin. Originally called the Nachrichtenbüro ("Intelligence Bureau"), it was soon renamed the Nachrichten-Abteilung or "Intelligence Department", known simply as N for short.

== Organisational structure and growth ==
The department soon grew in size to four members, despite Tirpitz's continued obstructions. It had three heads during its 18 years in existence; its first director was Commander (later Naval Captain) Arthur Tapken, whose qualifications may have been burnished by the fact that he was married to an Englishwoman. Tapken was succeeded around March 1914 by Frigate Captain (later Naval Captain) Walther Isendahl, who was replaced in turn by Naval Captain Paul Ebert in February 1918. The director of N customarily signed documents with a capital 'N' and the first letter of his own name.

Within N, duties were divided between several subdivisions. The most important was the overseas intelligence gathering division, NI, which was managed from 1913 to 1919 by Commander (later Naval Captain) Fritz Prieger. Secretarial responsibilities were managed by Naval Lieutenant Georg Stammer, who handled correspondence for N and NI and also worked for naval counter-espionage. More branches were added during the First World War, when N grew hugely in size. Although its numbers are not recorded in the surviving German archives of the period, it certainly employed hundreds of staff at the very least; its army counterpart employed over 1,100 people at its peak in 1918. One of those employed by N in a minor position was Wilhelm Canaris, who rose to become head of the Abwehr, Nazi Germany's military intelligence service. A naval counter-espionage agency called G (for Gegenespionage or counter-espionage) was spun off from N, under the authority of Paul Ebert, who was to become N's director in 1918. A sabotage branch called NIV was established within N in the spring of 1916, operating under the cover of a commercial agency.

N operated in a significantly different fashion from its great rival, the British Secret Service Bureau (which later divided to become MI5 and MI6). It was directly integrated into the Admiralstab and recruited exclusively from the Imperial Navy, in contrast to its more independent and less military-oriented British counterpart. Rather than pursuing careers in the organisation, its staff would serve stints of a few years in N before rotating back out into mainstream naval careers. After Tapken left N in 1914, for instance, he continued working for the Admiralstab in various capacities and was promoted to rear-admiral during the war.

== Targets and agents ==
The primary target of N was the British Royal Navy, the largest and most powerful navy of the time. From its establishment in 1901 it sought to recruit a network of agents around the world to observe the movement of foreign warships, which in practice meant principally British ships. Political considerations led N to also focus attention on the French Navy. The organisation recruited two types of agents; Berichterstatter (BEs) or reporters, and Vertrauensmänner (VMs) or "confidential men". BEs were originally intended to gather intelligence on foreign naval movements while VMs were to help supply German warships in wartime. The commanders of individual German battleships were responsible for recruiting agents in each of their ports of call. To protect agent networks, all communications with BEs were routed exclusively through "main correspondents" (Hauptberichterstatter or HBEs) who were responsible for providing them with codes, wireless telegraphs and other secret communications equipment during periods of international tension or war.

Recruiting agents was not straightforward for N. It sought to recruit reserve German army officers working abroad, but this resulted in complaints from the army and only produced a few recruits (though this exercise did make it possible for N to recruit more agents during the war). Its army intelligence counterpart, Abteilung IIIb, was of little help; the two agencies viewed each other as rivals and were reluctant to share information or assets. The various German steamship companies, especially the Hamburg America Line (HAPAG), provided a valuable source of recruits. Shipping employees were regarded as ideal candidates for recruitment; they were widely traveled, often expert in naval matters and were stationed across the world. Their companies were happy to cooperate as they looked forward to receiving valuable naval contracts, while the employees themselves would enjoy exemption from conscription so that they could continue to work as naval intelligence agents. The German agent Carl Hans Lody, who spied in the UK in the early months of the First World War, was one such example of a shipping employee who had been recruited as an operative.

One of the most active N spy handlers during World War I was Hilmar Dierks. Based in Rotterdam in the neutral Netherlands he recruited several spies for espionage trips into Great Britain. They include Dutch sailors Haicke Janssen and Willem Roos, who were both arrested in Great Britain and executed in the Tower of London, as well as Ernst Waldemar Melin, Augusto Alfredo Roggen and Irving Guy Ries. As citizens of neutral states as the Netherlands, Sweden, and the United States, they could travel freely to the United Kingdom. They produced no significant intelligence. Dierks' involvement in recruiting Dutch citizens led to his arrest by Dutch police in June 1915.

The German Foreign Office was also an important source of recruits, with the Admiralstab approaching diplomats and consular officials to recruit them directly or to enlist their help in recruiting others. The Foreign Office had reservations about this activity, as they feared the consequences if it became known that their diplomats were working as spies, but their views changed as international tensions rose and by 1911 the Foreign Office fully supported the Imperial Navy's recruitment efforts.

== Operational activities and demise ==
On the eve of the First World War, N had established a global "war intelligence system" (Kriegsnachrichtenwesen or KNW) which was intended to provide a flow of intelligence on foreign naval movements in the event of war or heightened tension. In practice, the system proved a failure. Britain cut Germany's overseas cables in August 1914, cutting off contact between N and many of its operatives abroad. In 1915 the Admiralstab instructed most of its overseas agents to discontinue their activities. In addition, the German navy's operational plans changed so frequently that it made it almost impossible to undertake long-term intelligence-gathering. These limitations meant that N's activities made little impact on the outcome of the war.

The Treaty of Versailles in 1919 prohibited Germany having any intelligence organisation whatsoever. As a result, N was dissolved, with Fritz Prieger, its former head of foreign intelligence gathering, in charge of the winding-up of the agency.
