= Granville station (SkyTrain) =

Metro Vancouver SkyTrain station

Granville
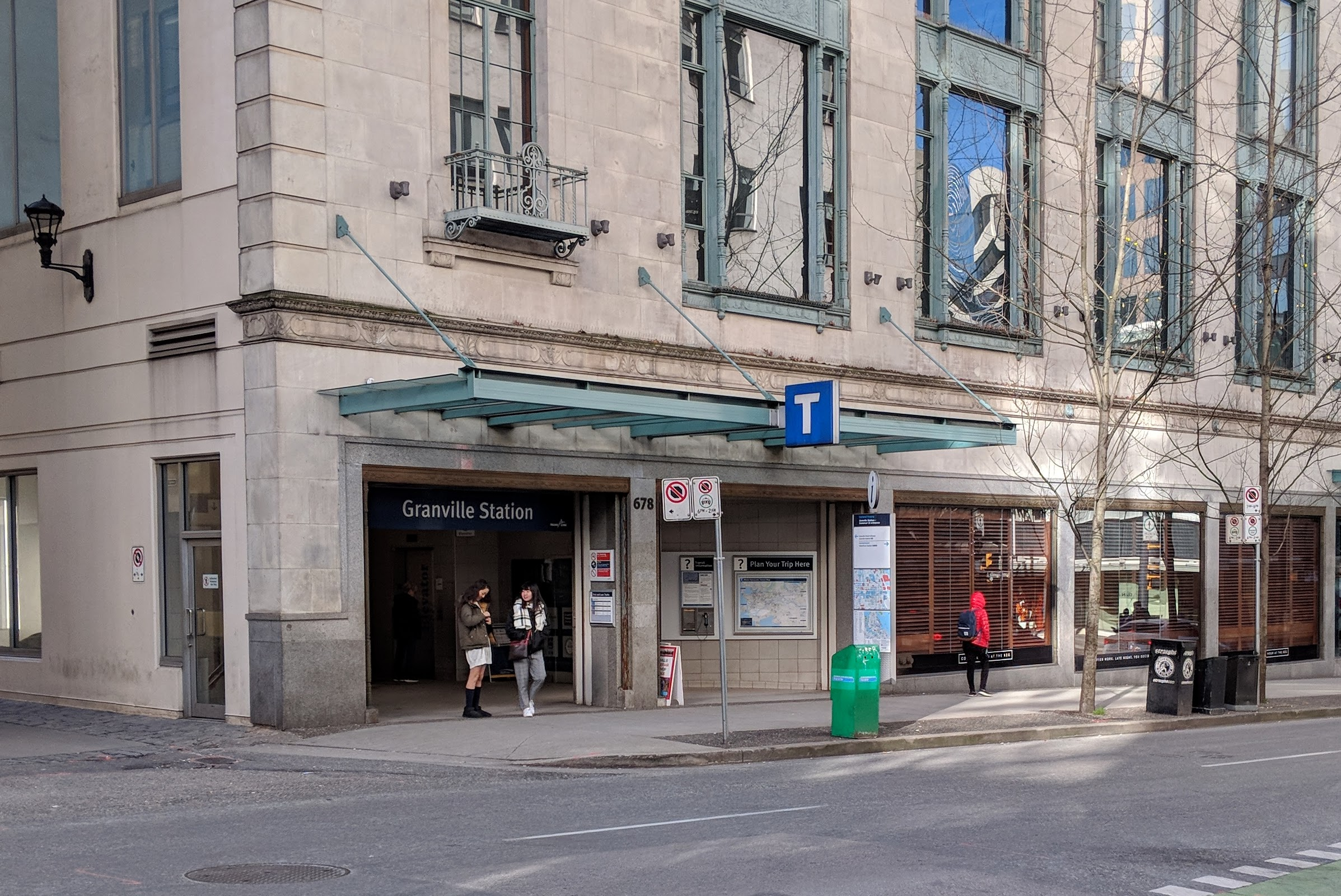
- The Dunsmuir Street entrance opened in 2006.

General information
- Location: 655 Seymour Street, Vancouver
- Coordinates: 49.282750°N 123.116639°W
- System: SkyTrain station
- Owner: TransLink
- Platforms: Split platforms
- Tracks: 2
- Connections: Vancouver City Centre

Construction
- Structure type: Subway
- Depth: 25 metres (82 ft)
- Platform levels: 2
- Accessible: yes
- Architect: Architektengruppe U-Bahn

Other information
- Station code: GV
- Fare zone: 1

History
- Opened: December 11, 1985; 40 years ago
- Rebuilt: 2006; 20 years ago

Passengers
- 2025: 5,861,000 ▼4.7%
- Rank: 5 of 54

Services
| Preceding station | TransLink | Following station |
|---|---|---|
| Burrard towards Waterfront | Expo Line | Stadium–Chinatown towards King George or Production Way–University |
Location

Granville is an underground station on the Expo Line of Metro Vancouver's SkyTrain rapid transit system. The station is located in Downtown Vancouver on the portion of Granville Street that is known as the Granville Mall. The station is accessible from the surface via entrances on Granville Street and Seymour Street (both between Georgia and Dunsmuir Streets), and the Dunsmuir entrance between Granville and Seymour.

The station serves the shopping and entertainment districts along Granville and Robson Streets, as well as the office and shopping complexes of Pacific Centre and Vancouver Centre. The station is also within walking distance of such amenities as Robson Square (home of the Vancouver Art Gallery, the Provincial Court of British Columbia, and a satellite campus of the University of British Columbia), the Orpheum Theatre, Vancouver Library Square, TD Tower, Scotia Tower and the HSBC Canada Building.

== History ==
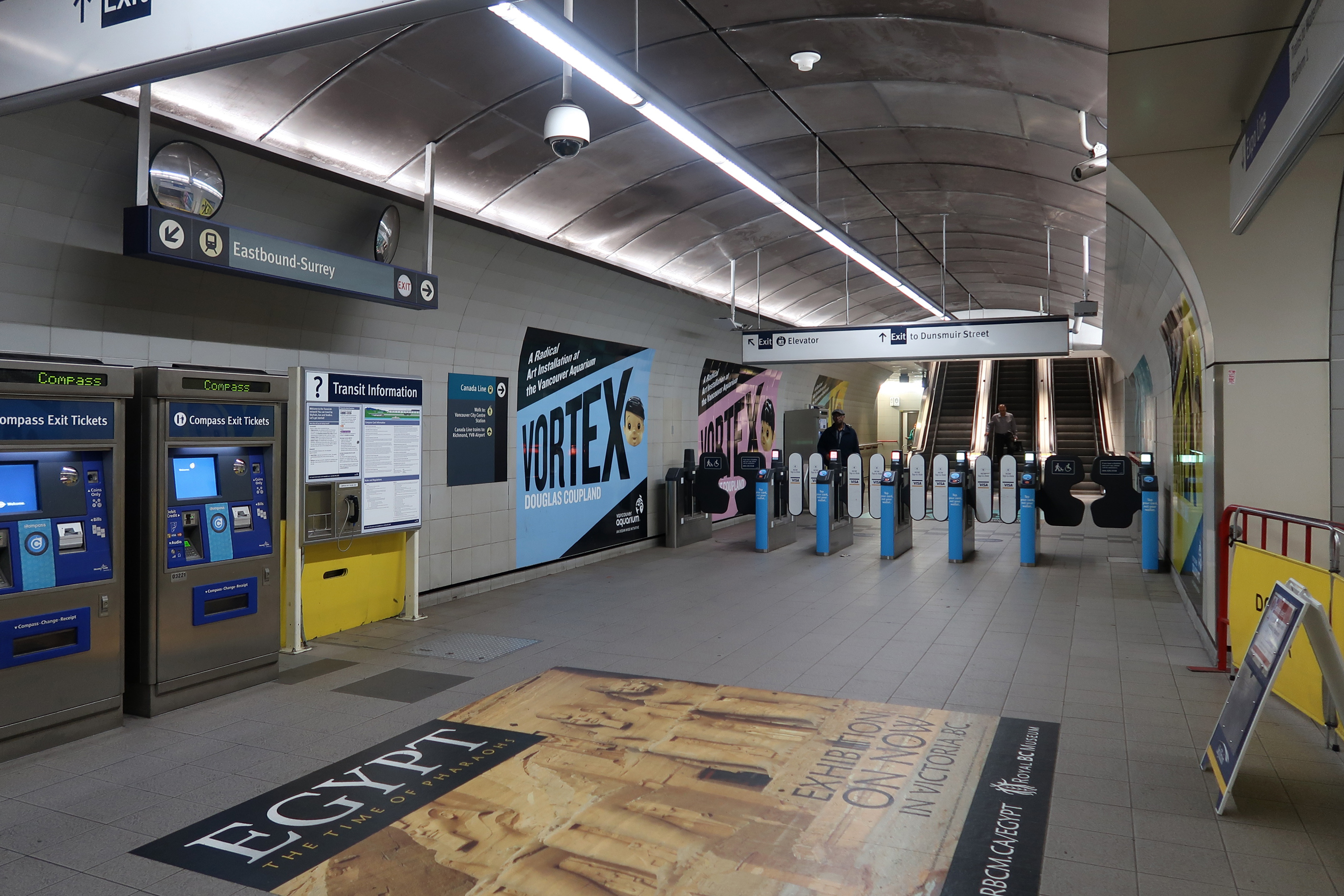
Access to Dunsmuir Street, showing fare gates

Granville station opened in 1985 and is named for nearby Granville Street, which name is derived from "Granville", the name of the original settlement that preceded Vancouver prior to its incorporation in 1886. The Austrian architecture firm Architektengruppe U-Bahn was responsible for designing the station. Its entrances are integrated with Pacific Centre, a shopping mall: BC Transit (the precursor agency to TransLink) signed an agreement with the Hudson's Bay Company in 1983 to lease a sub-basement corridor under the mall for $1 in order to build an entrance facing Granville Mall.

On September 22, 2006, elevator access was introduced from Dunsmuir Street with the completion of the neighbouring Hudson on Granville development, and large signs were added at the platform level to guide passengers to the newly available elevators. The entrance has separate escalator access to the platform levels independent of the existing station in a similar two up/one down configuration for the longest bank, and a ticket-vending level with a connection to the existing Granville Mall entrance and the Hudson's Bay and Pacific Centre shopping mall. There are retail spaces within the new addition's ticket vending lobby and in the passageway to Hudson's Bay.

The design of the addition, its capacity, and connection to Granville Mall made it possible for the original facility to be closed entirely; however, it remained in full service. The original station area closed only temporarily for lighting upgrades from October 23, 2006, to mid-November.

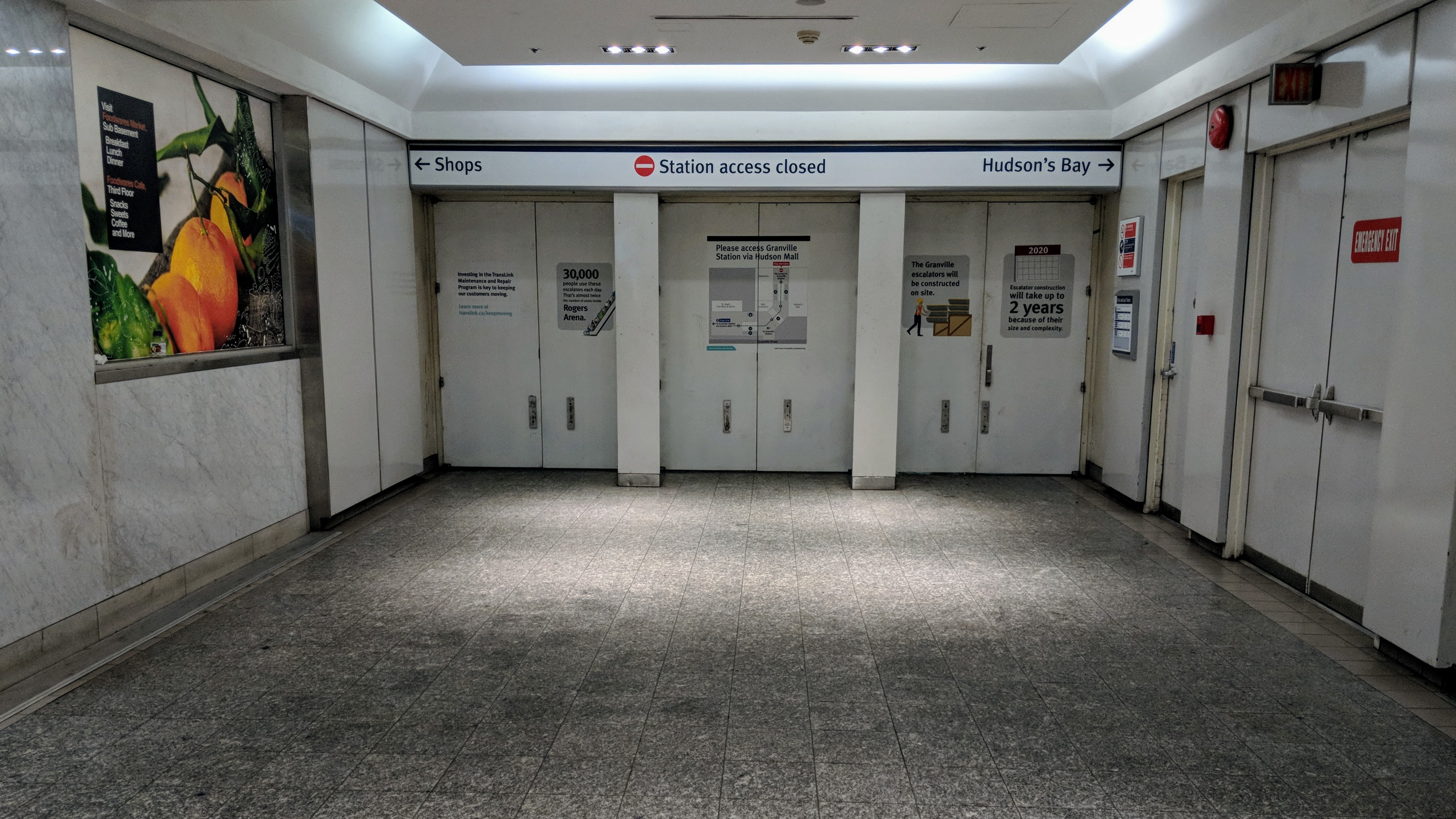
Access was closed off at the Seymour Street entrance for two years.

On May 8, 2018, TransLink announced the Granville Station Escalator Replacement Project as part of the TransLink Maintenance and Repair Program. The replacement of six escalators began on May 26, 2018, resulting in the closure of the Seymour Street entrance and the closure of the Granville/Seymour concourse. On July 17, 2020, the escalators returned to service and the Seymour Street entrance was re-opened.

== Structure and design ==
Like Burrard station, the station was built inside the Dunsmuir Tunnel and has a distinctive platform design. The westbound track (to Waterfront) is stacked above the eastbound track (to King George and Production Way–University stations), with both platforms within the historical single-track tunnel's footprint. At approximately 25 metres (82 ft) underground, Granville station is the deepest subway station on the Expo Line.

== Services ==
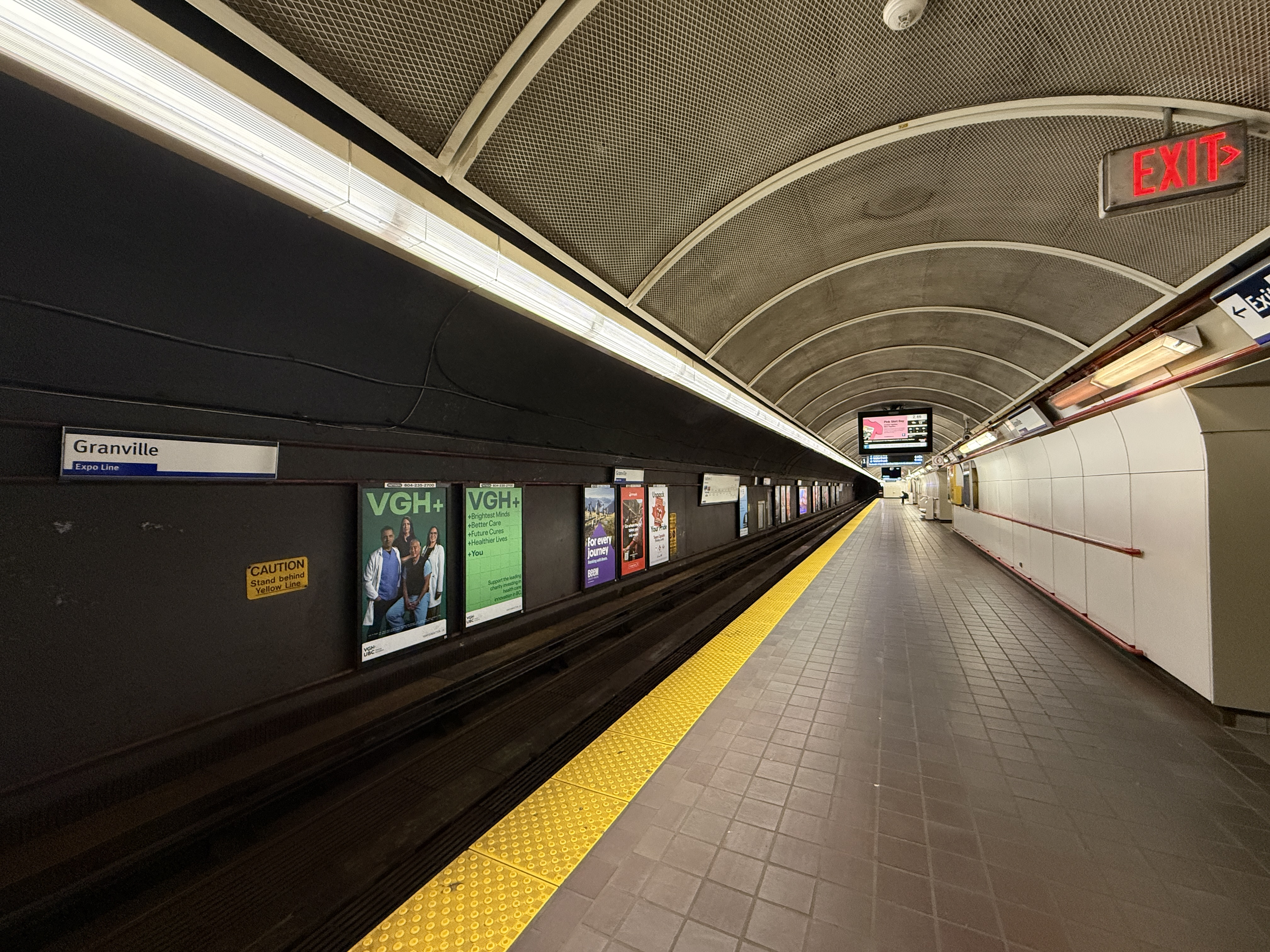
Granville station platform

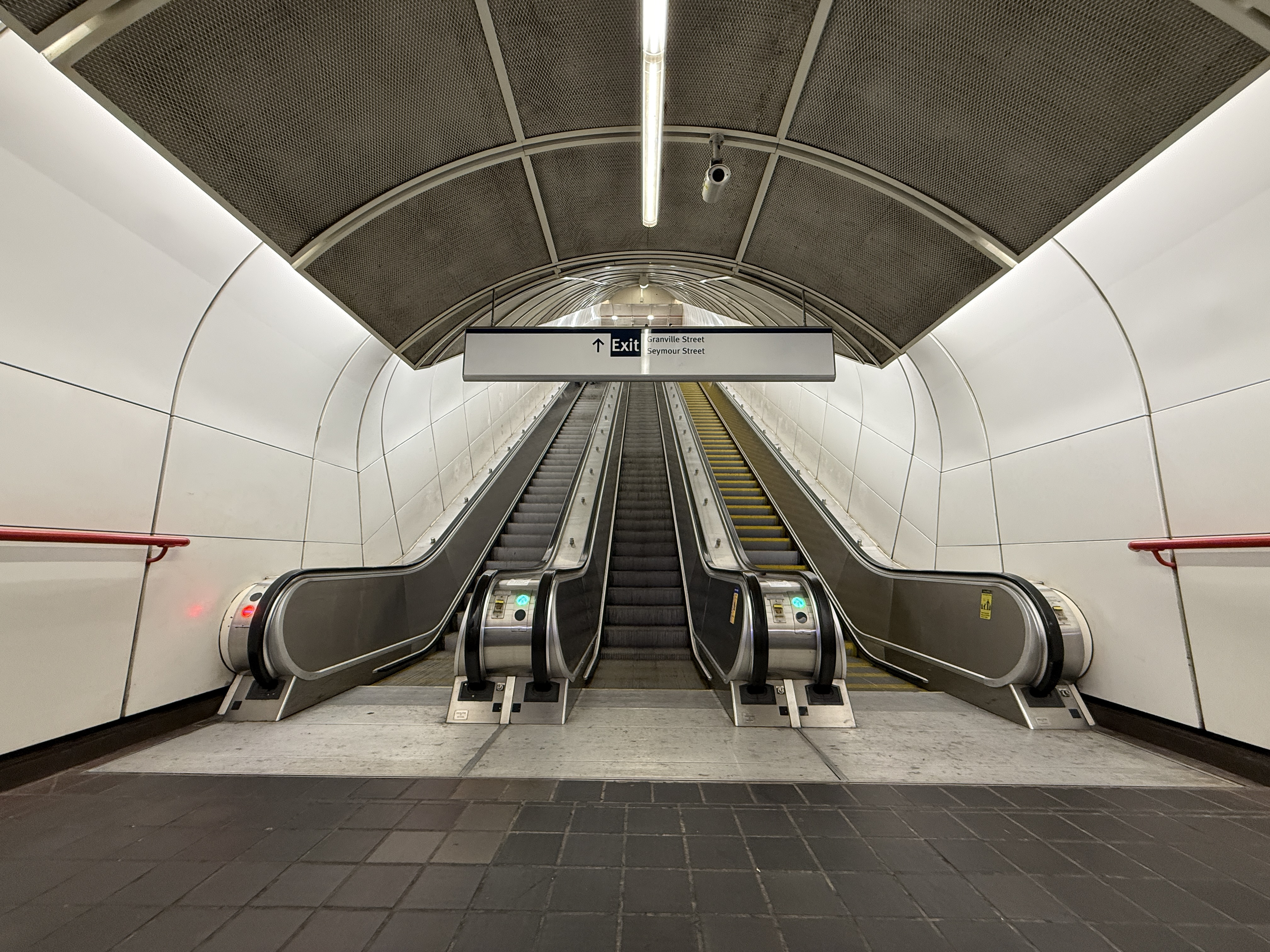
Granville station escalators

Granville station is one of four SkyTrain stations on the Expo Line that serve Downtown Vancouver. It connects with many TransLink bus routes, including trolleybus routes on the Granville Mall and suburban bus routes (running on nearby Georgia Street) heading to and from North and West Vancouver. Passengers are able to transfer to the Canada Line (served by Vancouver City Centre station) by walking through Pacific Centre or Vancouver Centre and the Hudson Bay department store, although the only direct transfer point is at Waterfront station.

There is a small retail space standing at the bottom of the long escalator bank in the original station area, where the corridor splits into the westbound and eastbound routes. It is one of the few stores located entirely within a fare paid zone of any SkyTrain station.

Granville station is unique in being one of only a few stations having no surface entrance building of its own, independent of any adjacent buildings (Main Street–Science World station is another for example). The station has three entrances: Granville Mall through the Hudson's Bay Company department store, Seymour Street with direct access to the ticketing platform, and Dunsmuir Street through the Hudson condominium development.

== Station information ==
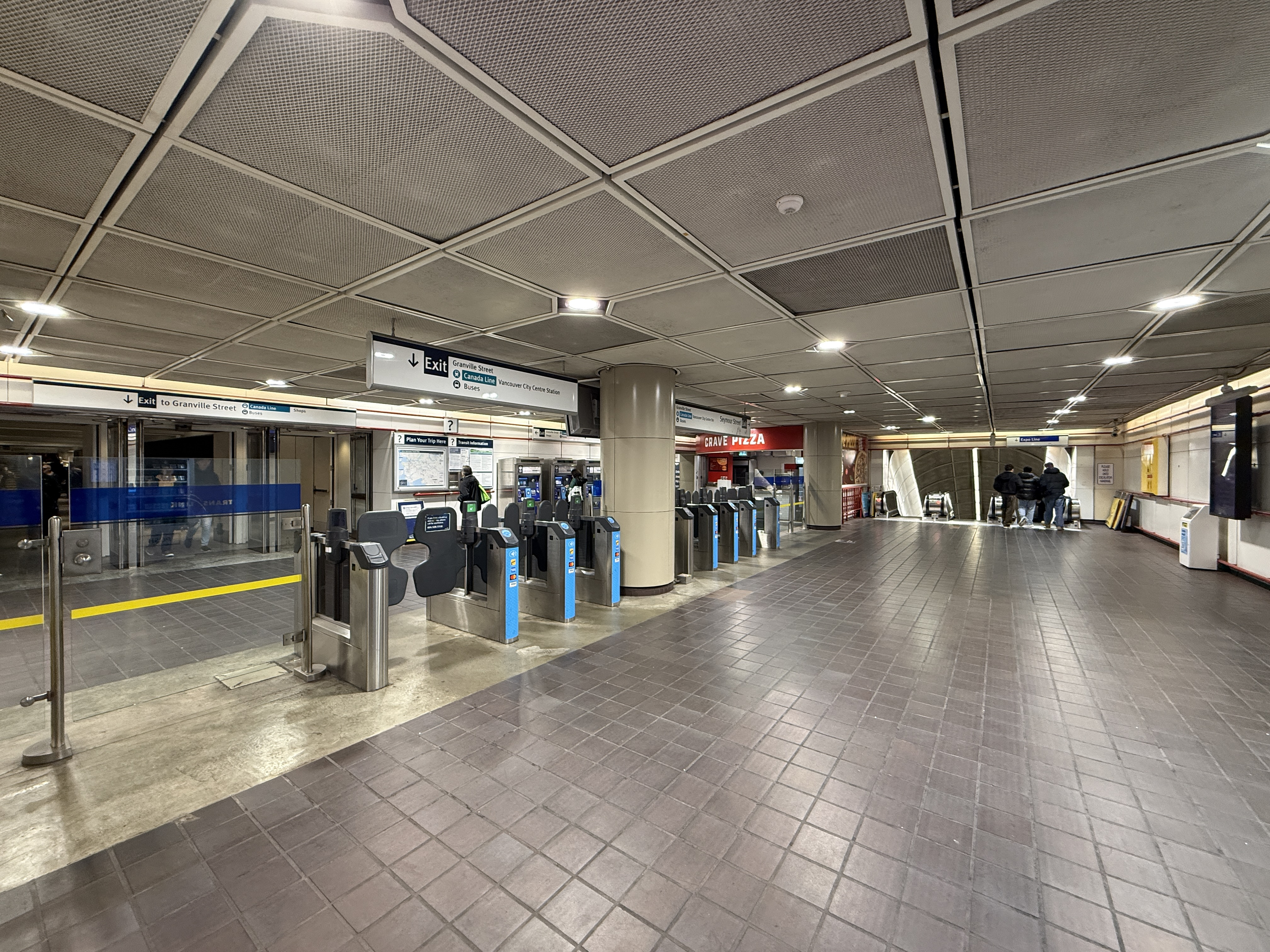
Granville Street concourse

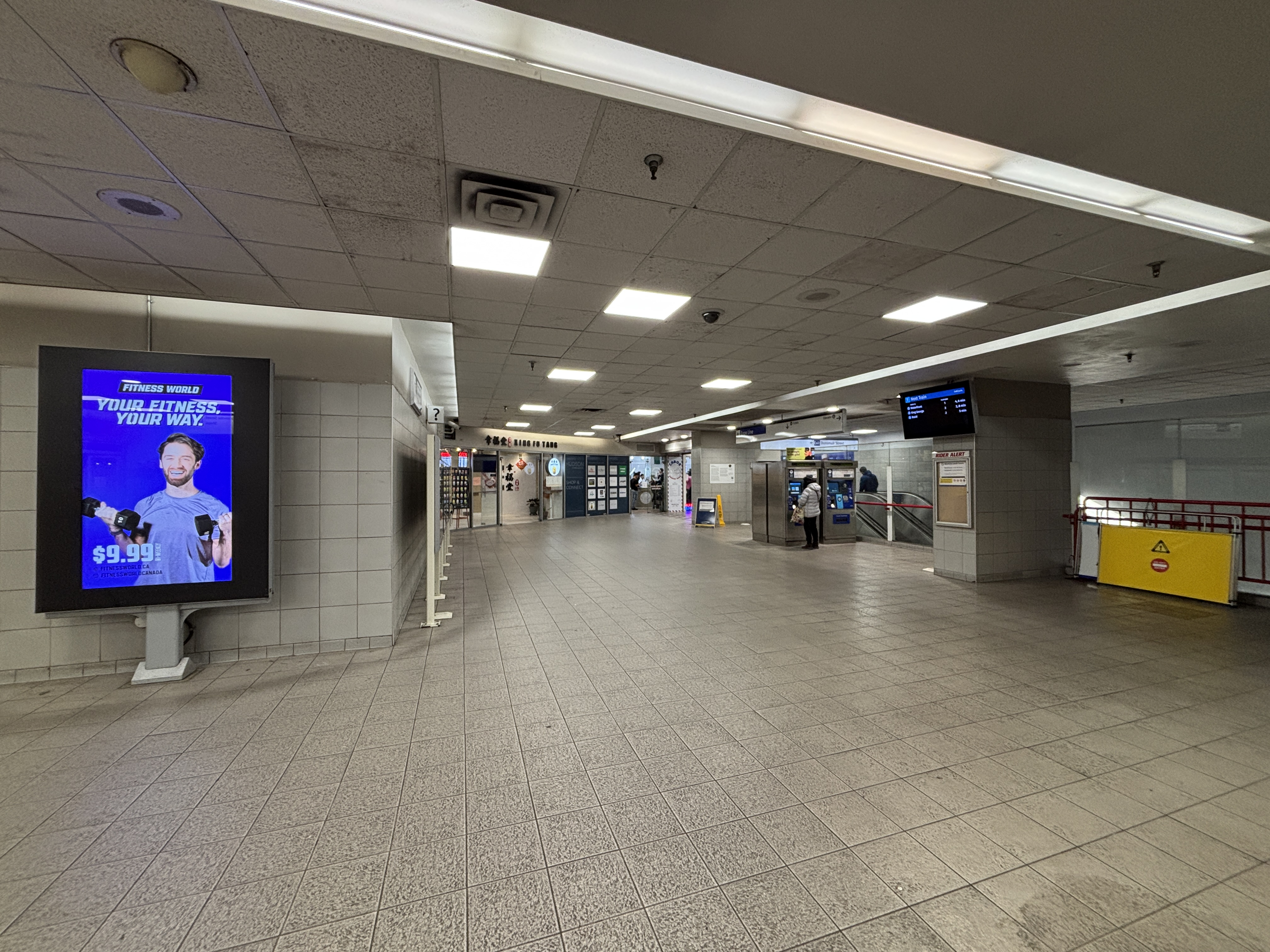
Dunsmuir Street concourse (completed in 2006)

=== Entrances ===
- Granville Street entrance: the original main entrance for the station. Underground connection to the second basement level of HBC department store and Pacific Centre is available at concourse level. Three escalators are available between the platform and concourse levels; however, none is available between concourse and street. The escalator to this entrance is accessible via the newer Dunsmuir entrance through an underground connection. No elevator is available at this entrance, and there is no stairway available between the concourse and platform levels.
- Seymour Street entrance: connects to the concourse of the Granville entrance via a short stairwell. No escalator or elevator access is available from this entrance.
- Dunsmuir Street entrance: Built in 2006, it provides elevator and escalator access between street and platform. It also include an underground connection to the Granville entrance at the concourse/street level. Similar to the Granville entrance, there are three escalators, but no stairway is available between the concourse and platform levels. Fare gates are located at the inbound platform level for this entrance.

=== Transit connections ===
- Local and night buses operate on Granville Street, in front of the entrance all days Monday to Thursday and during daytime on Friday, Saturday, Sunday, and Holidays:
- 4 Powell
- 4 Downtown
- 7 Dunbar
- 7 Nanaimo Station
- 10 Granville
- 10 Downtown
- 14 UBC
- 14 Hastings
- 16 Arbutus
- 16 29th Avenue Station
- 17 Oak
- 20 Victoria
- 50 False Creek South
- 50 Waterfront Station
- During Friday, Saturday, Sunday, and Holidays evening, buses are rerouted to Seymour Street, near the Seymour entrance:
- 4 Powell
- 7 Nanaimo Station
- 10 Downtown
- 14 Hastings
- 16 29th Avenue Station
- 17 Oak
- 20 Victoria
- 50 Waterfront Station
- The NightBus terminus is along Howe Street between Pender and Dunsmuir. However, buses serve the stop along Seymour Street closest to the Seymour Street entrance:
- N8 Fraser
- N9 Coquitlam Station
- N10 Brighouse Station
- N15 Cambie
- N17 UBC
- N19 Surrey Central Station
- N20 Victoria
- N24 Lynn Valley
- N35 SFU
- The following suburban routes serves Georgia Street, with close proximity of the Granville entrance:
- 240 Lynn Valley
- 241 Upper Lonsdale (peak only)
- 246 Highland
- 247 Upper Capilano (peak only)
- 250 Horseshoe Bay
- 250A Dundarave
- 253 Caulfield
- 254 British Properties
- 257 Horseshoe Bay Express
