= Vancouver City Centre station =

Metro Vancouver SkyTrain station

Vancouver City Centre
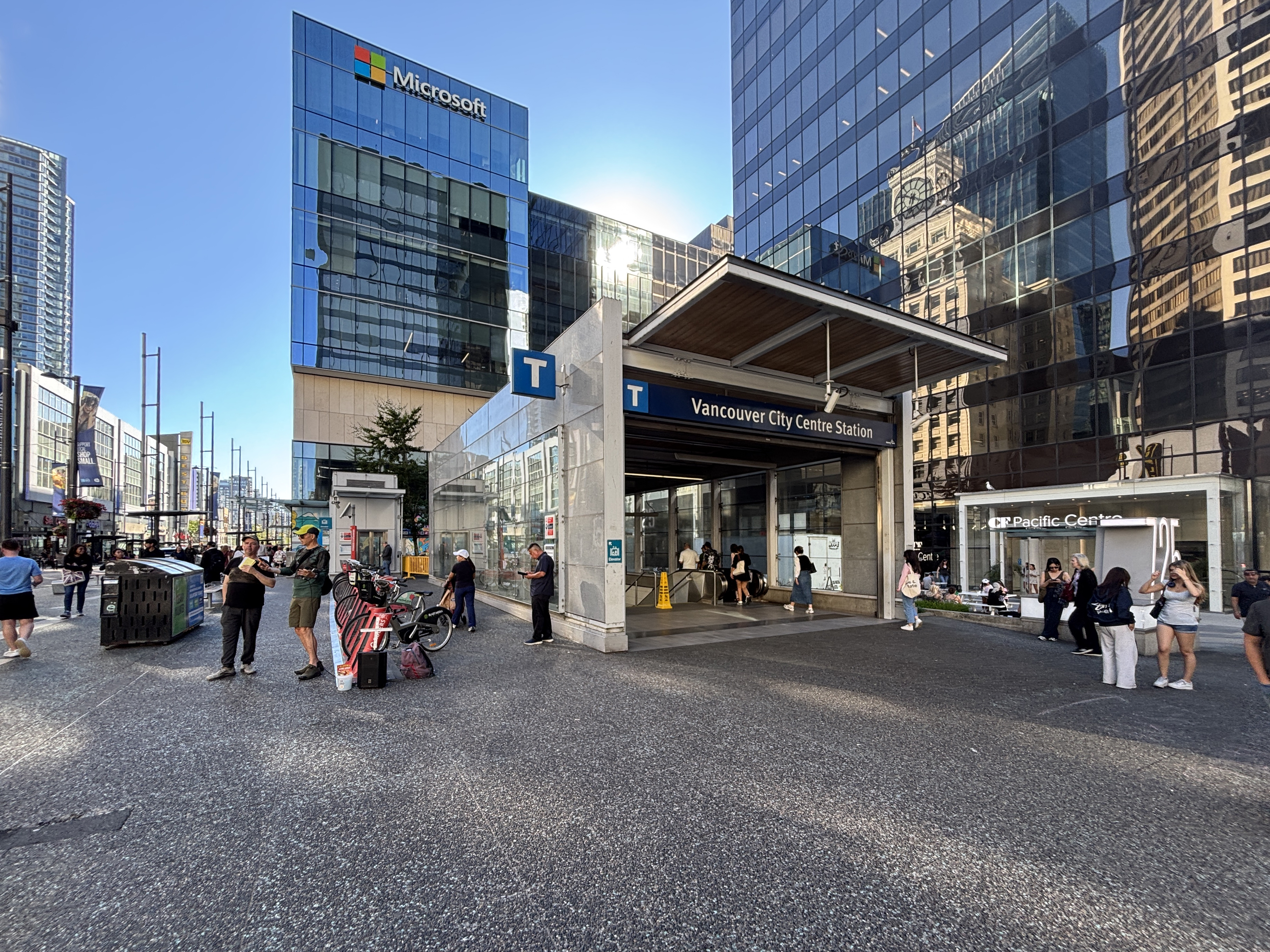
- Street level entrance outside of Pacific Centre in 2025

General information
- Location: 702 West Georgia Street, Vancouver
- Coordinates: 49.28202°N 123.11875°W
- System: SkyTrain station
- Owner: TransLink
- Platforms: Centre platform
- Tracks: 2
- Connections: Granville

Construction
- Structure type: Subway
- Accessible: yes
- Architect: VIA Architecture

Other information
- Station code: VS
- Fare zone: 1

History
- Opened: August 17, 2009

Passengers
- 2025: 4,941,000 ▼0.6%
- Rank: 8 of 54

Services
Preceding station	TransLink	Following station
Waterfront Terminus	Canada Line	Yaletown–Roundhouse towards Richmond–Brighouse or YVR–Airport
Location

Vancouver City Centre is an underground station on the Canada Line of Metro Vancouver's SkyTrain rapid transit system. The station is located on Granville Street, between West Georgia Street and Robson Street in Downtown Vancouver, and serves the shopping and entertainment districts along Granville and Robson streets, and the office and shopping complexes of Pacific Centre and Vancouver Centre.

The station is within walking distance of Robson Square (home of the Vancouver Art Gallery, the Provincial Court of British Columbia, and a UBC satellite campus), the Orpheum Theatre, Vancouver Library Square, TD Tower, Scotia Tower and the HSBC Canada Building.

== History ==
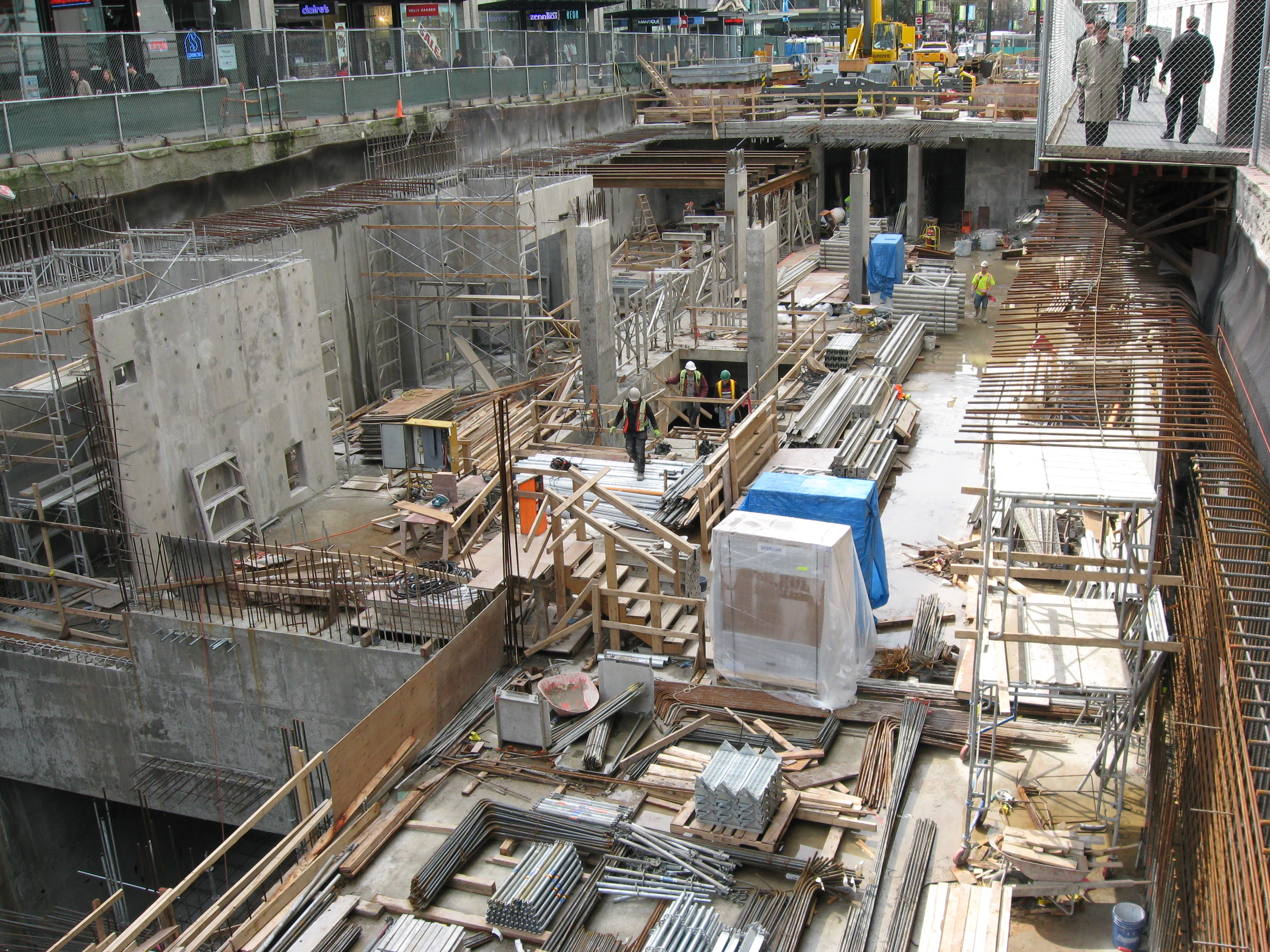
Construction outside of Pacific Centre (right) on Granville Street in April 2008

Vancouver City Centre station opened in 2009 and is named for its location in the centre of downtown Vancouver. VIA Architecture was the architecture firm responsible for designing the station.

In 2018, TransLink announced that Vancouver City Centre station, as well as two other Canada Line stations located in downtown Vancouver, would receive an accessibility upgrade which includes additional escalators. Construction is expected to begin in early 2019 with completion by the fourth quarter of 2019.

== Services ==
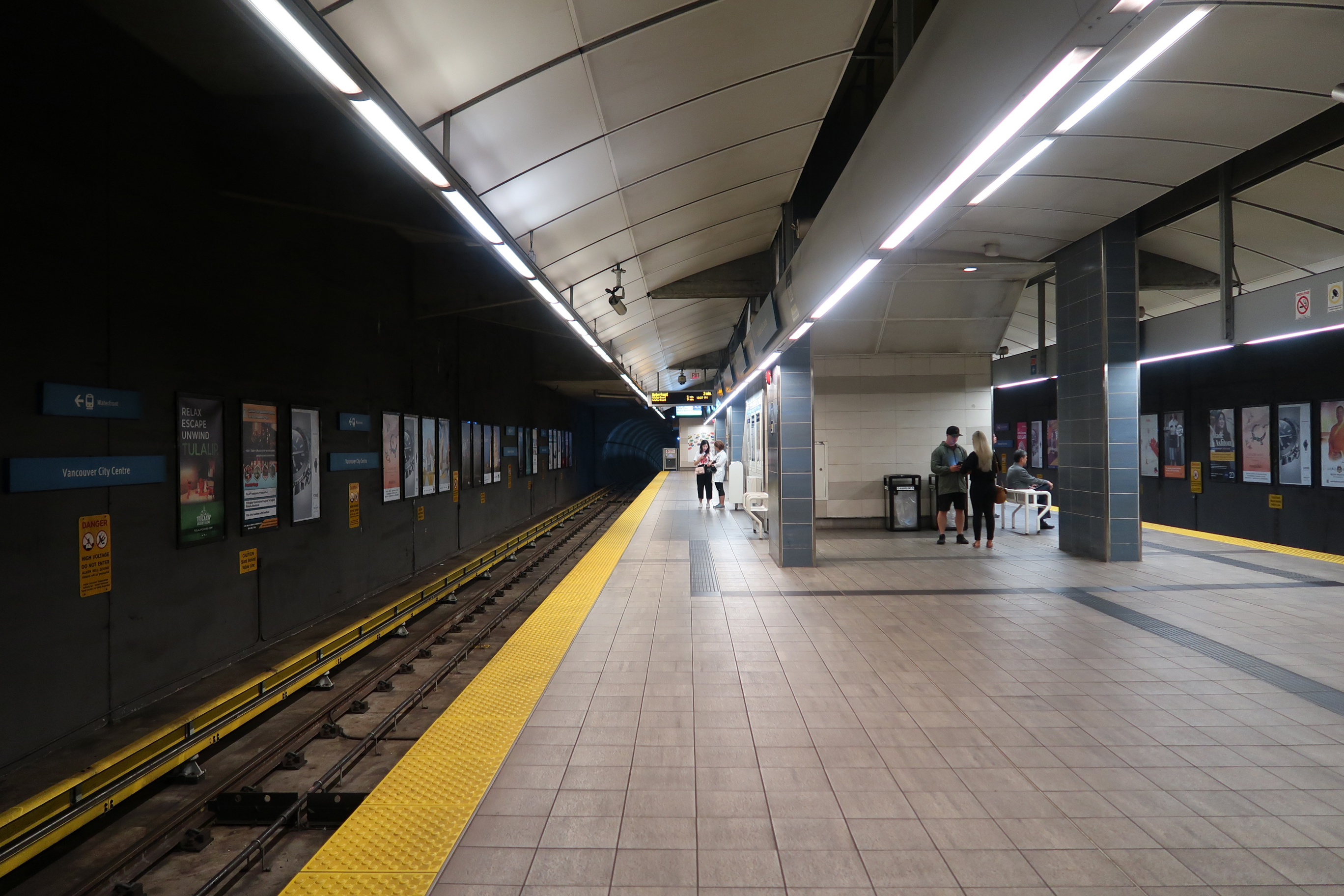
Platform level; inbound on the left, outbound on the right

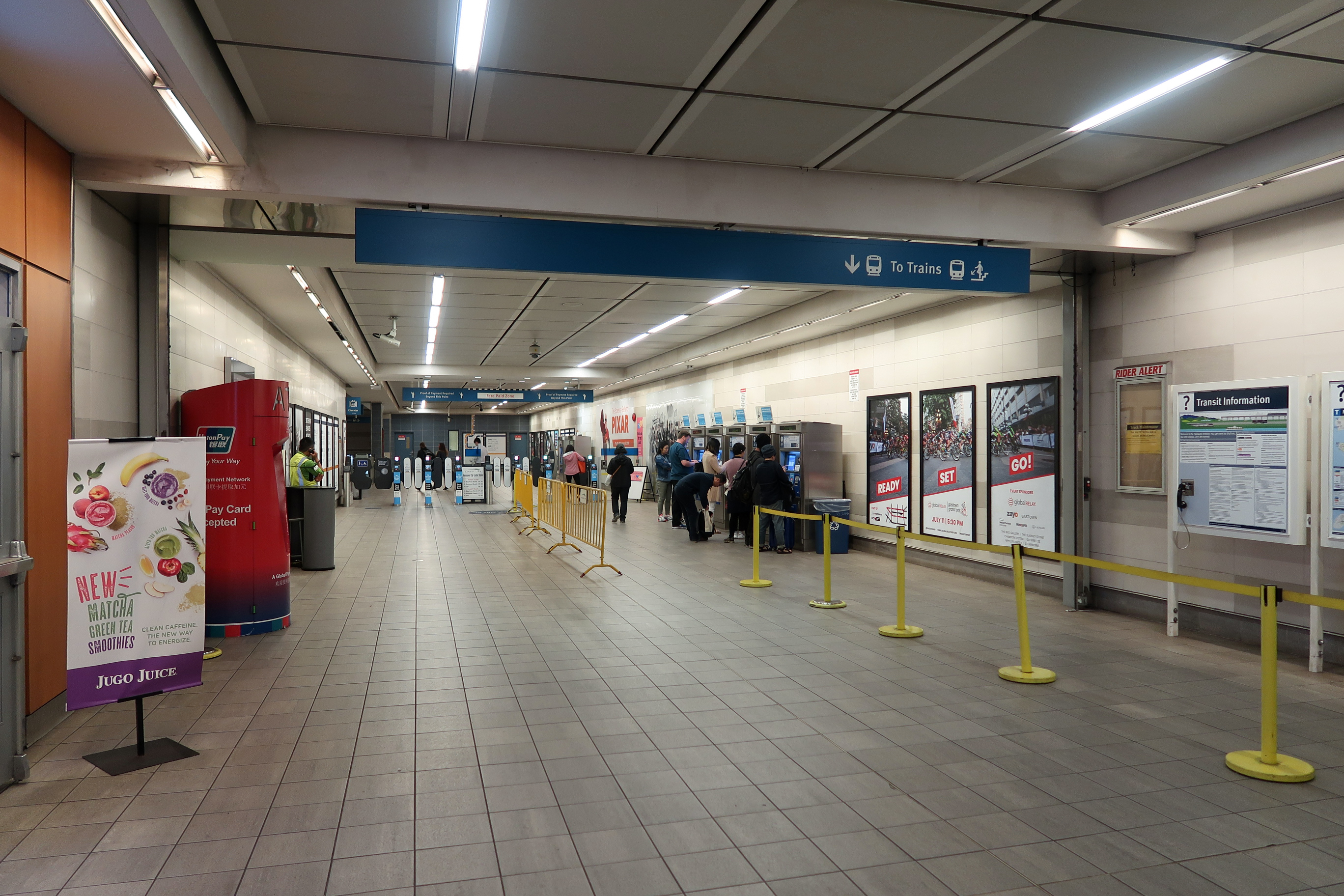
Station entry with fare gates and Compass vending machines

The station is located within a short walking distance of bus stops for bus services throughout Vancouver (especially the trolleybus services on Granville Mall) and to the North Shore. There are underground connections between the station and both the Pacific Centre and Vancouver Centre shopping malls. Passengers are able to reach Granville station (on the Expo Line) during regular retail hours while remaining indoors by walking through Pacific Centre or Vancouver Centre and Hudson's Bay department store, although the only direct transfer point between the Canada Line and the Expo Line is at Waterfront station.

== Station information ==
=== Entrances ===
- Street level entrance: located at the southwest corner of the intersection of Granville Street and West Georgia Street. Elevator access at this entrance is located south of the main entrance building.
- Concourse level entrances: have a direct connection to Pacific Centre and Vancouver Centre shopping malls.

=== Transit connections ===
The following bus routes can be found in close proximity to Vancouver City Centre station:

Local	North Shore	NightBus
4 UBC/Powell; 7 Dunbar / Nanaimo Station; 10 Granville; 14 UBC; 16 Arbutus / 29th Avenue Station; 17 Oak; 20 Victoria; 50 False Creek South	240 Lynn Valley; 241 Upper Lonsdale (peak only); 246 Highland; 247 Upper Capilano (peak only); 250 Horseshoe Bay; 250A Dundarave; 253 Caulfield (peak only); 254 British Properties (peak only); 257 Horseshoe Bay Express	N8 Fraser; N9 Coquitlam Central Station; N10 Brighouse Station; N15 Cambie; N17 UBC; N19 Surrey Central Station; N20 Victoria; N22 Macdonald; N24 Lynn Valley; N35 SFU
