= Pacific Centre =

Shopping mall in Vancouver, Canada

CF Pacific Centre
- Exterior viewed from Robson Square
- Coordinates: 49.28339°N 123.117911°W
- Address: 701 West Georgia Street; Vancouver, British Columbia; V7Y 1G5
- Opened: 1971; 55 years ago
- Manager: Cadillac Fairview
- Owner: Cadillac Fairview (50%); Ontario Pension Board (25%); Workplace Safety & Insurance Board (Ontario) (25%)
- Num. of stores: 100
- Num. of anchor tenants: 1
- Floor area: 66,016.2 square metres (710,593 sq ft)
- Floors: 3
- Parking: 1758
- Public transit: Vancouver City Centre
- Website: shops.cadillacfairview.com/property/cf-pacific-centre

Pacific Centre (officially CF Pacific Centre since 2015) is a shopping mall located in Vancouver, British Columbia, Canada. It is owned by Cadillac Fairview, the Ontario Pension Board, and the Workplace Safety and Insurance Board, and is managed by Cadillac Fairview.

Based on the number of stores, most of which are underground, it is the largest mall in Downtown Vancouver, with over 100 stores and shops, and the seventh-busiest mall in Canada, with 22.1 million annual visitors as of 2018. The mall is directly connected to the Vancouver Centre Mall, and the Vancouver City Centre SkyTrain station, and the former Four Seasons Hotel Vancouver. It was previously connected to Granville station station via a Hudson's Bay location, but since the store closed in 2025, the connection is no longer available.

== History ==
Built between 1971 and 1973, it was an unofficial Eaton Centre. It was a joint venture of Cemp Investments, Toronto Dominion Bank and T. Eaton Company. The Pacific Centre was home to an Eaton's department store, succeeded by Sears Canada after 2002 and vacated in the fourth quarter of 2012. A Nordstrom store opened in its former space in 2015 but closed in 2023.

The City of Vancouver approved a 53,700-square-metre (578,000 sq ft) expansion of Pacific Centre, including retail premises that will extend to the street on both sides of West Georgia Street, and a direct link connecting the shopping centre with Vancouver City Centre SkyTrain station on Granville Street. The link opened in August 2009 in conjunction with the opening of the Canada Line.

On 20 January 2017, Cadillac Fairview announced an agreement to sell a 50 percent interest in its Vancouver properties, including Pacific Centre, to the Ontario Pension Board and Ontario's Workplace Safety and Insurance Board, each to hold a 25% stake. Cadillac Fairview, itself a subsidiary of the Ontario Teachers' Pension Plan, will retain the remaining 50% interest and continue to manage the properties.

The rotunda glass dome at the northeast corner of the intersection of West Georgia Street and Howe Street was redeveloped in the early 2020s. Cadillac Fairview constructed a new two-storey pavilion building with 1,300 square metres (14,000 sq ft) of floor area that included a new Apple flagship store. Nordstrom's flagship store closed on 13 June 2023 as the company exited the Canadian market.

== List of anchor stores ==
Name	No. of floors	Year opened	Year closed	Notes
Eaton's	8	1971	2002	
Holt Renfrew	3	1975	2007	
Holt Renfrew	3	2007	—	Replaced north wing of Pacific Centre
Nordstrom	3	2015	2023	Replaced Sears
Sears Canada	7	2002	2012	Replaced Eaton's

== Transportation ==
Pacific Centre is located at the Granville Mall, which is a junction between the Expo and Canada Lines of Vancouver's SkyTrain rapid transit system. Two stations service the mall, Granville and Vancouver City Centre station, respectively.

== Incidents ==
In November 2012, BC attorney general Shirley Bond ordered an investigation into a Downtown Vancouver Business Improvement Association (DVBIA) Genesis Security undercover security guard who physically assaulted a person with a disability whom he had accused of shoplifting. During the altercation, which was recorded on security cameras and witnesses' cellphones, the guard was seen hitting the man, throwing him from his wheelchair, and yelling profanities at him. In January 2013, the Ministry of Justice ruled that the guard had used unnecessary force. He was fined $230 and had his security license suspended for two month with a condition requiring re-certification on use of force before he could receive his license.

== Gallery ==
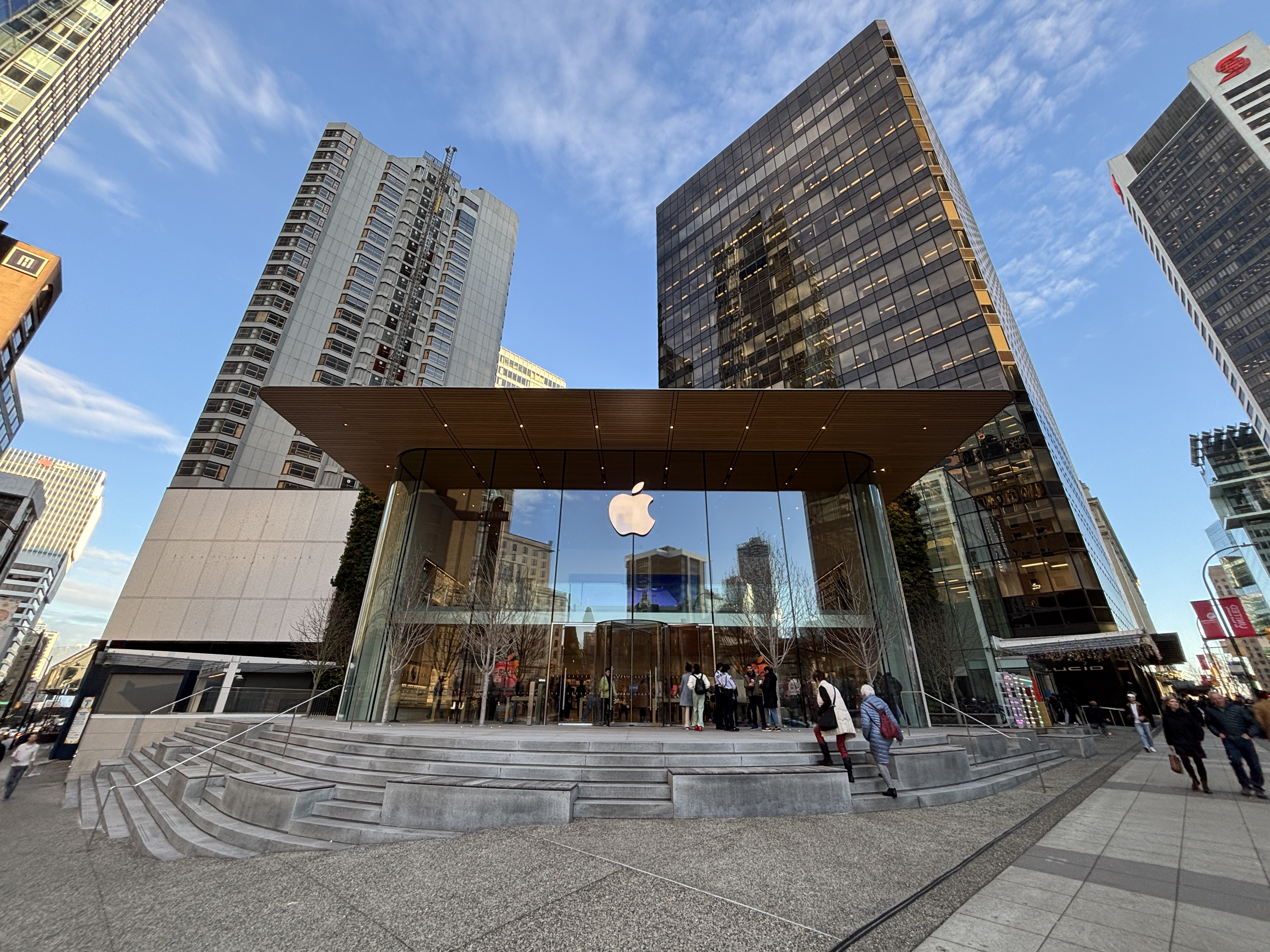
Exterior of Apple Store (December 2024)

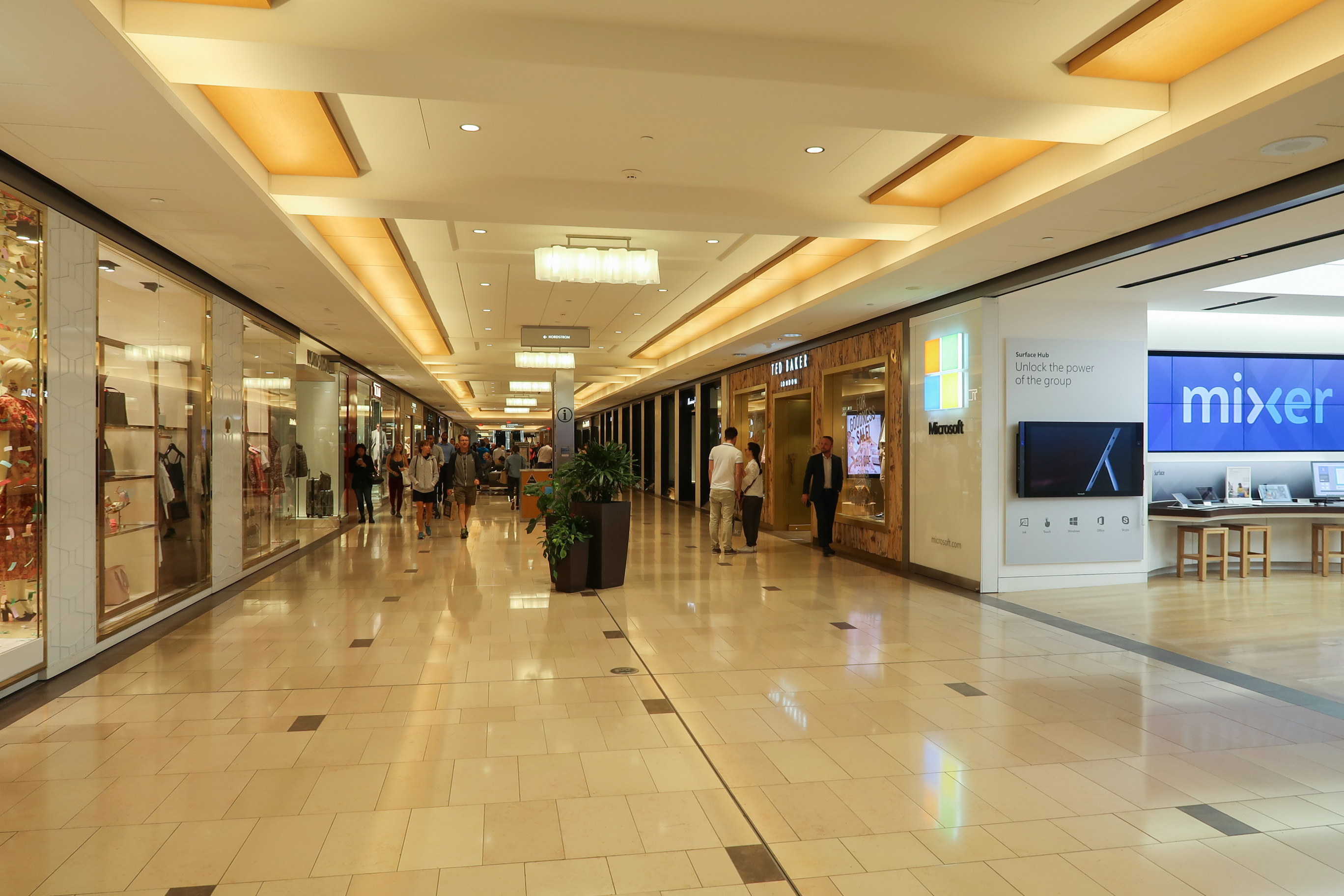
Interior of basement

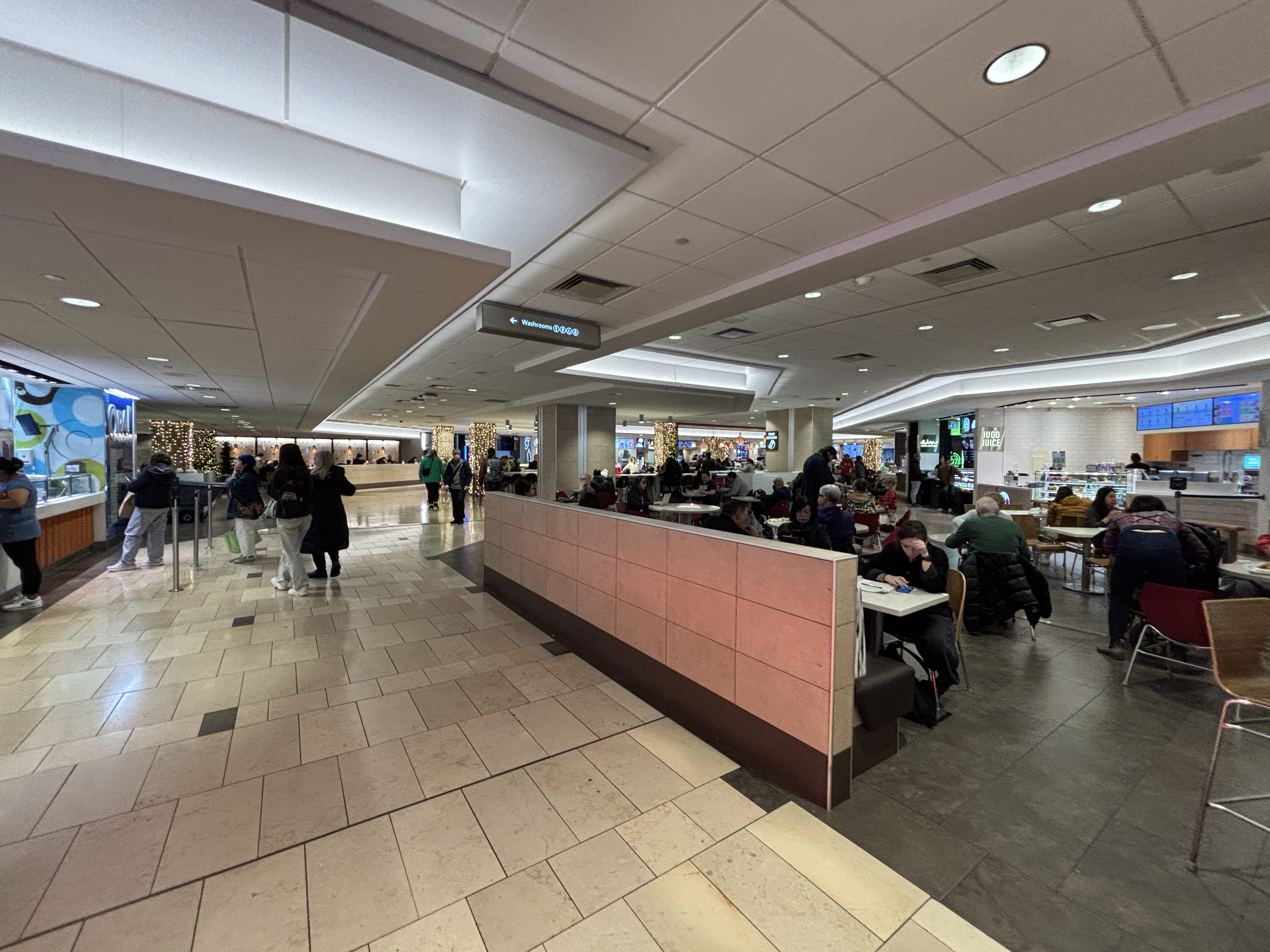
Food court in basement

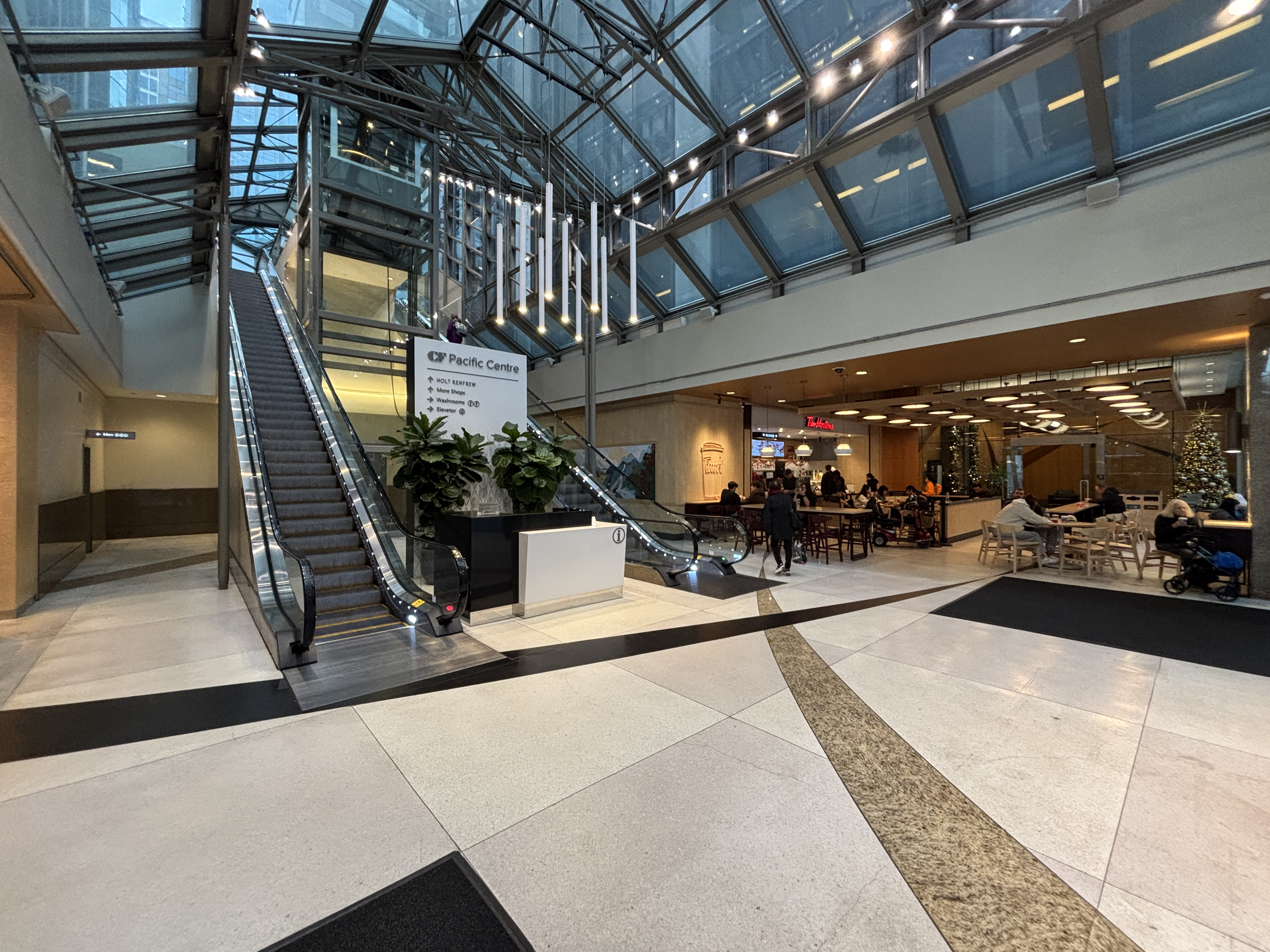
West Pender Street Entrance

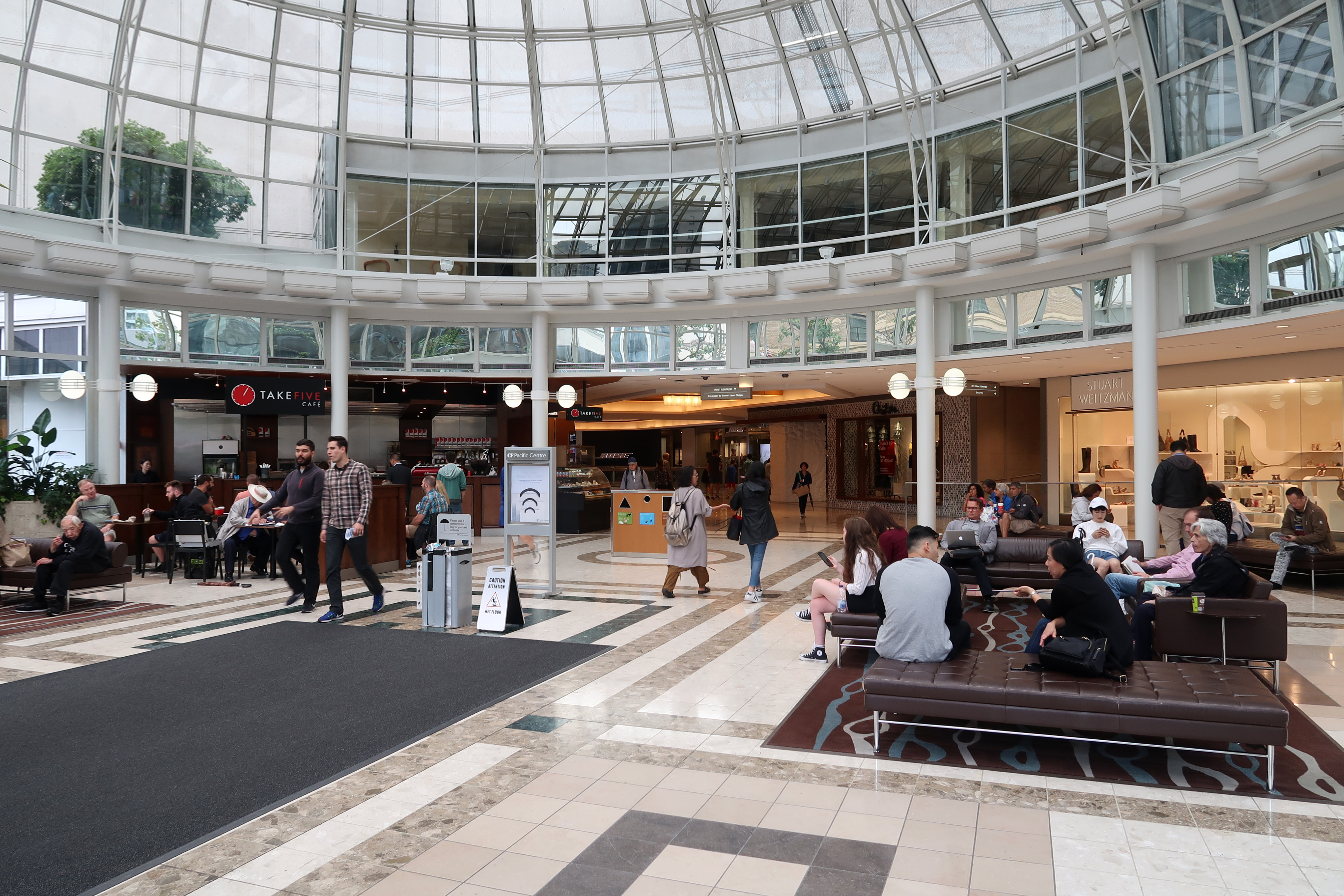
Interior of grand atrium in 2018 before demolition

== See also ==
- List of largest shopping malls in Canada
- Hotel Vancouver (1916), which once sat on the site of Pacific Centre
