= Granville Entertainment District =

- Neighbourhood
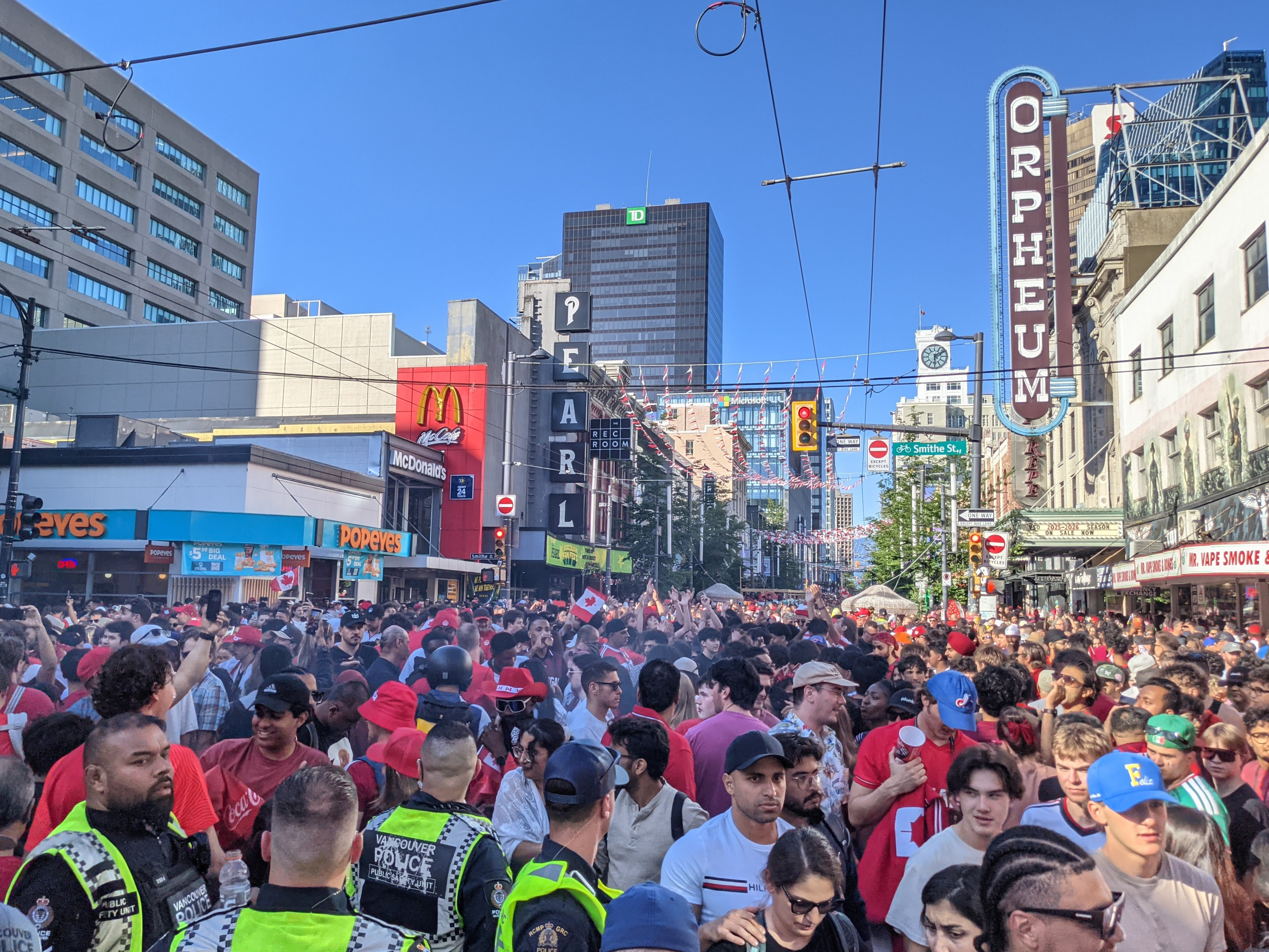
- Crowd celebrating after Canada's first win during the 2026 FIFA World Cup hosted at BC Place

- Location in Metro Vancouver
- Coordinates: 49.28139°N 123.12389°W
- Country: Canada
- Province: British Columbia
- City: Vancouver

The Granville Entertainment District is a neighbourhood in Downtown Vancouver known for its vast assortment of bars, danceclubs, restaurants, nightlife, and urban adult oriented shops and entertainment. The entertainment district centred on a seven-block stretch of the Granville Mall and surrounding streets.

== History ==
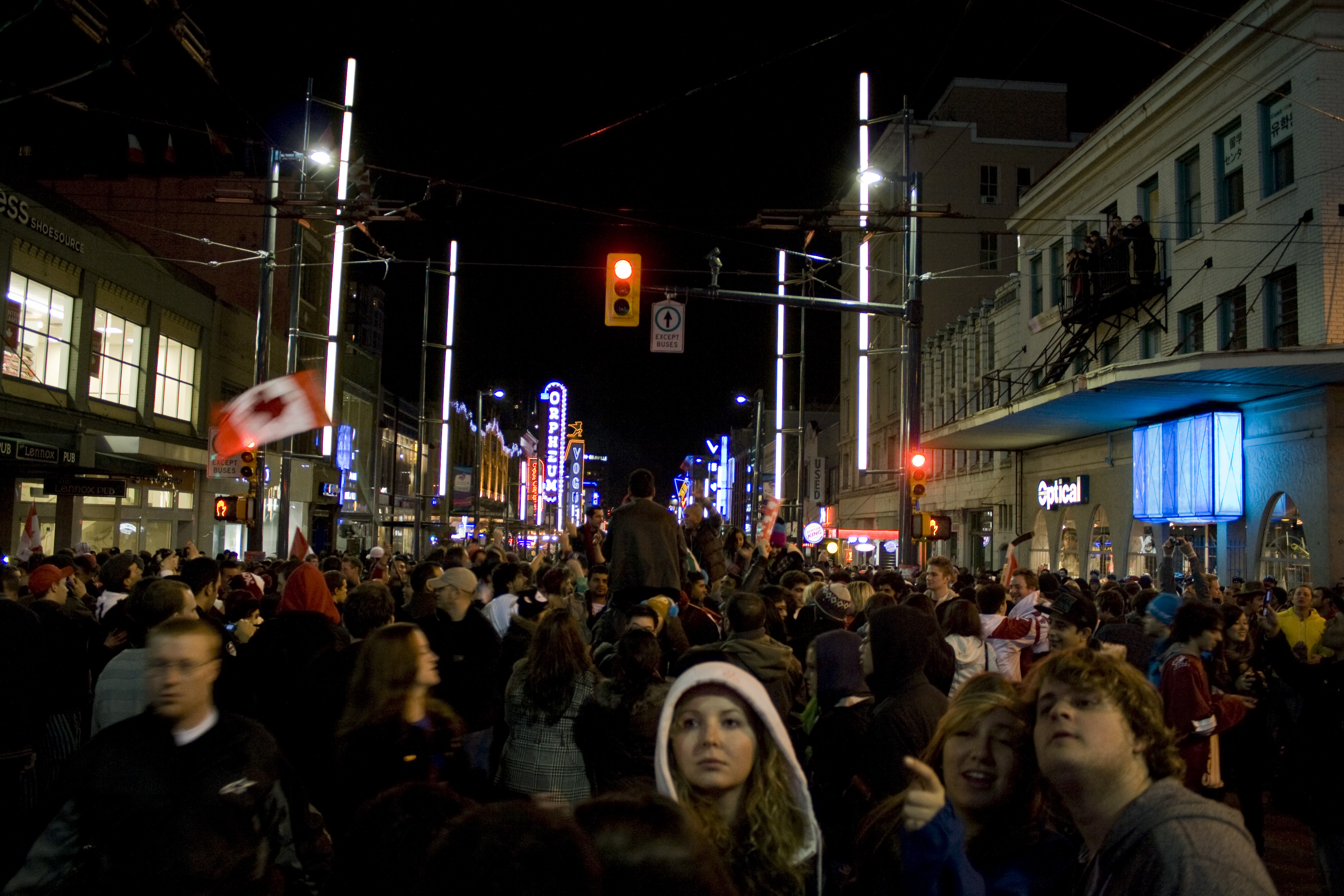
Pedestrians look on as the 2010 Vancouver Olympic festivities spill into Granville Street

The city of Vancouver, and subsequently one of its biggest streets, were originally named after Granville Leveson-Gower. The city eventually changed its name to Vancouver, but Granville Street stuck, and the Entertainment District derived its name from being part of the same street.

Prior to the establishment of the Entertainment District, the area was home to a number of movie theatres, which gave that stretch of Granville Street the nickname "Theatre Row".

In the 1990s, the city created the entertainment district by concentrating most of the city's liquor licenses to a then two-block stretch of Granville Street. Following this, many theatres closed or converted into being more profitable nightclubs. The final remaining movie theatre in the former Theatre Row closed on November 4, 2012.

=== Former Theatre Row ===
- Capitol, 820 Granville (1920–1974, 1977–2005 as Capitol 6; demolished for the Capitol Residences condominium tower
- Caprice, 965 Granville (1912–1967 as Dominion, 1967–1988 as Downtown, 1992–1999; 2002-2018 as Caprice Nightclub.)
- Colonial, 603 Granville (1929–1972; demolished for the second phase of Pacific Centre)
- Granville 7, 855 Granville (1913–1938 as Globe, 1938–1964 as Paradise, 1964–1986 as Coronet, 1987–2012; was the last remaining cinema complex on Granville Street before its closure. Still under the name Granville 7, most recently owned and operated by Empire Theatres.)
- Lyric, 765 Granville (1891 - 1907 as Vancouver Opera House, 1913-1927 Orpheum, 1927-1935 Vancouver Theater, 1935-1947 and 1964–1969, 1947–1960 as International Cinema; demolished to make way for Eatons Department Store, now location of Nordstrom.)
- Orpheum, 884 Granville (1927–1975; concert hall and home of the Vancouver Symphony Orchestra since 1977. Originally built as the New Orpheum)
- Paradise, 919 Granville (1949-1972 and 1984–1989 as Studio, 1972–1978 as Eve, 1979–1981 as Lyric, 1981–1984 as Towne, 1989–1999; now the Studio Nightclub)
- Plaza, 881 Granville (1908–1935 as the Maple Leaf, 1936–1963, 1988-1991 and 1993–1997, 1963–1987 as Odeon; now the Venue Nightclub)
- Vancouver Centre, 650 West Georgia at Granville (1977–2002; now used by JLS Business College) (although officially addressed to West Georgia Street, technically part of Theatre Row due to its proximity with Granville. It basically sat on the site of the Strand and old Birks Building)
- Vogue, 918 Granville (1941–1987; now a live theatre)

== Notable venues and nightclubs ==
- Commodore Ballroom
- The Orpheum Theatre
- Vogue Theatre

== See also ==
Downtown Granville.com
