= Ontario Pension Board =

Canadian pension plan organization

- Type: Private
- Industry: Pension fund
- Founded: 1920s
- Headquarters: Toronto, Ontario, Canada
- Total assets: C$31 billion (Dec 31, 2020)
- Website: opb.ca

The Ontario Pension Board in Canada is an independent organization responsible for administering the Public Service Pension Plan, a defined benefit pension plan, for certain employees of the provincial government and its agencies, boards, and commissions. The Public Service Pension Plan (PSPP) generally covers civil servants, those employed in the Office of the Auditor General, and those required to be members by legislation or order-in-council.

Ontario Pension Board is one of Canada's top ten pension funds, nicknamed the "Maple Revolutionaries." Due to their size, they are not included in the Maple Eight.

== History ==
Ontario Pension Board was established in the early 1920s.

== Organization ==
The Ontario Pension Board (OPB) is the administrator of the Public Service Pension Plan (PSPP), a contributory defined benefit plan. Both employees (members) and their employers contribute to the PSPP to fund members' future pension benefits. The plan administers the pensions for some 44,000 members, and it pays pensions to about 39,000 retired members (and 6,600 deferred retirees). In 2023, OPB was 85% funded and had $31.7 billion in assets, with a membership of 99,200 and a 8.6/10 satisfaction rate among clients. Members contribute 7.4% of their annual salary up to the Year's Maximum Pensionable Earnings (YMPE) then 10.5% of their salary above the YMPE. The YMPE is $71,300 in 2025. On average, contributions fund 20–25% of pensions; the other 75–80% is funded by investment returns.

OPB had a 3.1% return in 2023, citing higher interest rates in global real estate, lower valuations and vacancies in office properties, and retail impacts from the COVID-19 pandemic as contributing factors to the lower return.

The OPB states it is committed to environmental, social and governance (ESG) issues and to promoting diversity, equity and inclusion (DEI).

In July 2016, the Investment Management Corporation of Ontario (IMCO) was created to pool the assets of OPB, the Workplace Safety and Insurance Board (WSIB), to improve investment returns. IMCO officially launched on July 24, 2017.

== Investments ==
In 2016 and 2023, 23.1% and 29.3% of investments were in real assets (real estate and infrastructure), respectively. This was in step with other Canadian pension funds which are known for holding more real estate than their developed world peers. In June 2024, it was reported by Bloomberg News that Canadian pension funds lost a combined $1.24 trillion in their property portfolios.

In January, 2017, Ontario Pension Board (OPB) and the Workplace Safety and Insurance Board (WSIB) acquired Cadillac Fairview's 50% interest in its Vancouver real estate portfolio, which included CF Pacific Centre. OPB and WSIB each held 25% interest before buying out CF.

In 2017, OPB and Cadillac Fairview announced the commencement of construction of a 32-storey office tower at 16 York Street in downtown Toronto.

IMCO, Investment Management Corporation of Ontario, officially launches on July 24, 2017.

In June, 2018, OPB's investment manager IMCO and Cadillac Fairview (CF) announced construction of a 46-storey Toronto office tower at 160 Front Street West. The development was slated to open in the fall of 2022. It opened in January, 2024.

In December, 2019, IMCO, Cadillac Fairview and Lincoln Property Company announced an $800 million investment to develop and acquire high quality multifamily assets in top US markets.

In August, 2020, IMCO offered $60 million to affordable housing in Toronto and Vancouver.

In 2023, OPB, through IMCO, invested $400 million in Northvolt, a Swedish battery manufacturer. This investment was part of a $1.2 billion investment with partners which included other Canadian and international investors. IMCO has since devalued its $400 million investment due to Northvolt's financial difficulties and bankruptcy filing in Sweden.
