= Robson Street =

Major thoroughfare in Vancouver, Canada

- Robsonstrasse
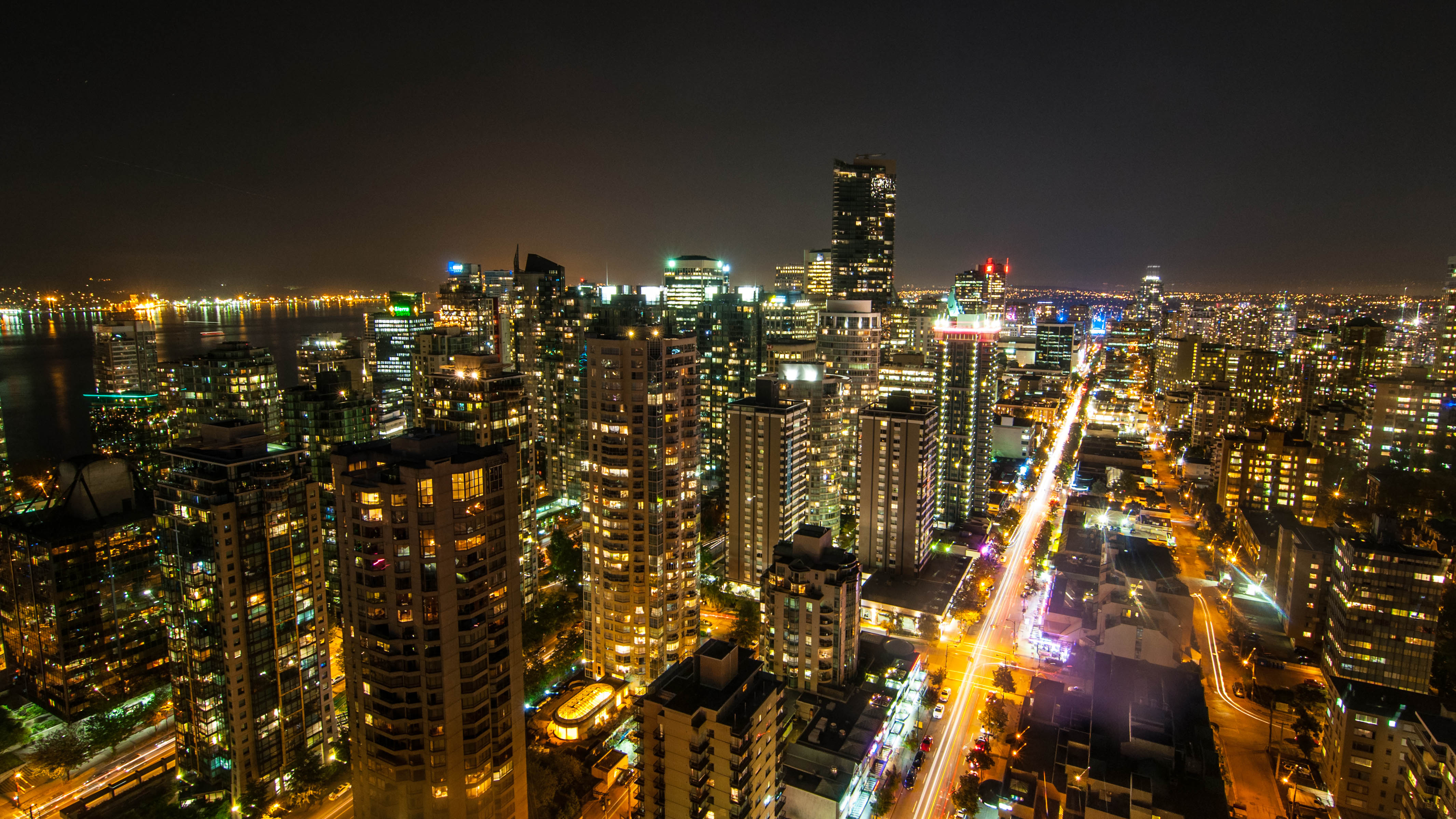
- Robson Street at night (2012)
- Interactive map of Robson Street
- Namesake: John Robson
- Type: Street
- Length: 2.5 km (1.6 mi)
- Location: Downtown
- Nearest metro station: Vancouver City Centre Station
- NW end: Chilco Street
- Major junctions: Burrard Street; Howe Street; Granville Street; Seymour Street
- SE end: Beatty Street

Other
- Known for: Shopping district, Robson Square

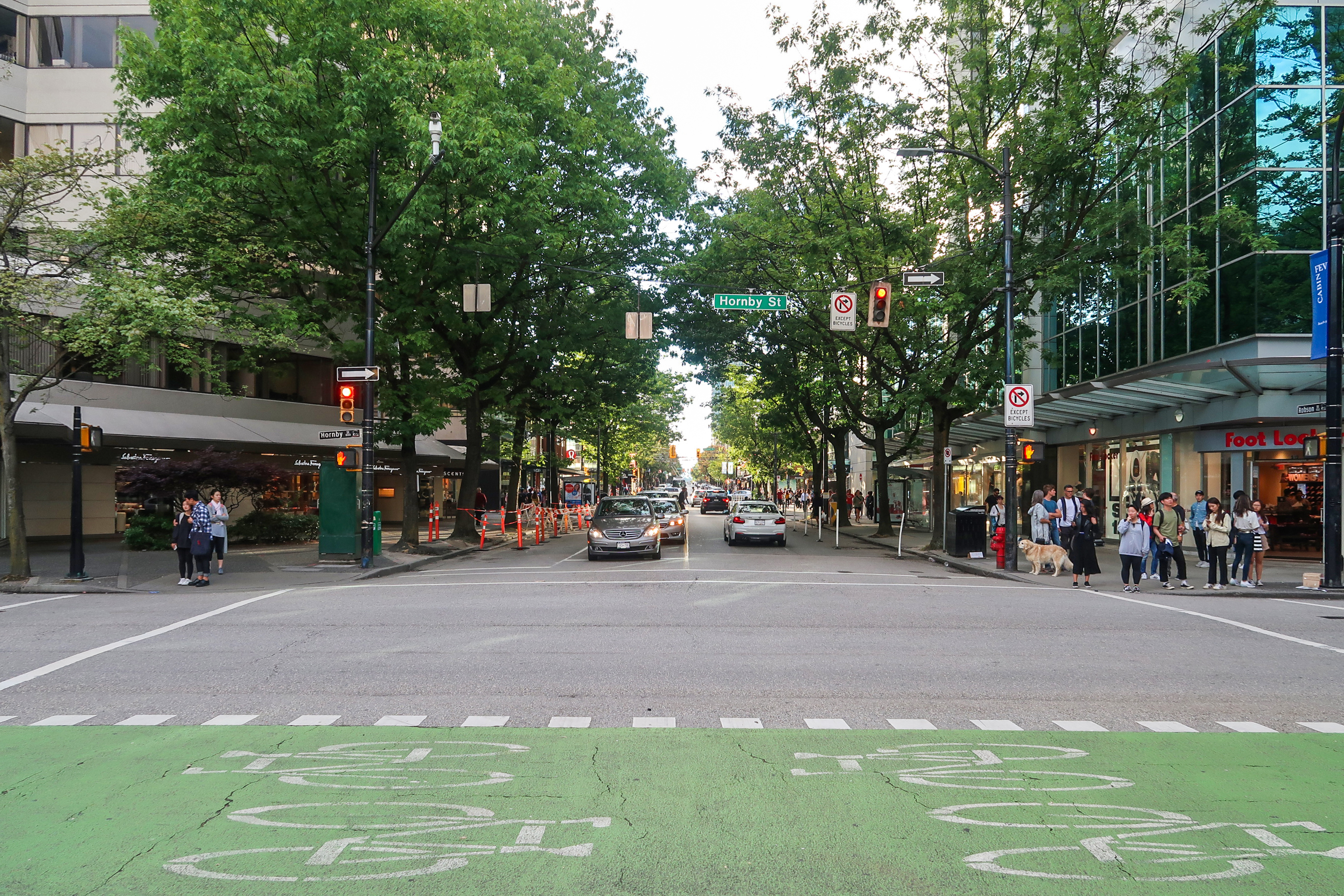
Robson Street view from Hornby Street

Robson Street is a major southeast-northwest thoroughfare in downtown and West End of Vancouver, British Columbia, Canada. Its core commercial blocks from Burrard Street to Jervis were also known as Robsonstrasse. Its name honours John Robson, a major figure in British Columbia's entry into the Canadian Confederation, and Premier of the province from 1889 to 1892. Robson Street starts at BC Place Stadium near the north shore of False Creek, then runs northwest past Vancouver Library Square, Robson Square and the Vancouver Art Gallery, coming to an end at Lost Lagoon in Stanley Park.

== History ==
In 1981, a development team presented the city government with a proposal to build a glass canopy over sections of Robson Street. It was designed by architect Bing Thom to promote year-round use of the street and add more retail space. The proposal was withdrawn in January 1982 due to an unwillingness from the city to change zoning codes to accommodate the project.

Robson street's intersection with Thurlow Street was the center of the Stanley Cup Riot of 1994.

== Major intersections ==
The entire route is in Vancouver.

km	mi	Destinations	Notes
0.0	0.0	Lagoon Drive Chilco Street	Continues west as Lagoon Drive into Stanley Park
0.3	0.19	Denman Street	
1.4	0.87	Thurlow Street	One-way, southwest bound
1.6	0.99	Burrard Street	
1.7	1.1	Hornby Street	One-way, northeast bound
1.7– 1.8	1.1– 1.1	Robson Square (no vehicle access)	
1.8	1.1	Howe Street (Highway 99 south)	One-way, southwest bound
1.9	1.2	Granville Street	Granville Mall (transit only)
2.0	1.2	Seymour Street (Highway 99 north)	One-way, northeast-bound
2.4	1.5	Cambie Street	
2.5	1.6	Beatty Street	Across from BC Place
1.000 mi = 1.609 km; 1.000 km = 0.621 mi: Closed/former; HOV only

== See also ==
- West End, Vancouver (Robson Street passes through the northeast edge of the West End)
- Davie Village
