= Granville Street =

Street in Vancouver, British Columbia

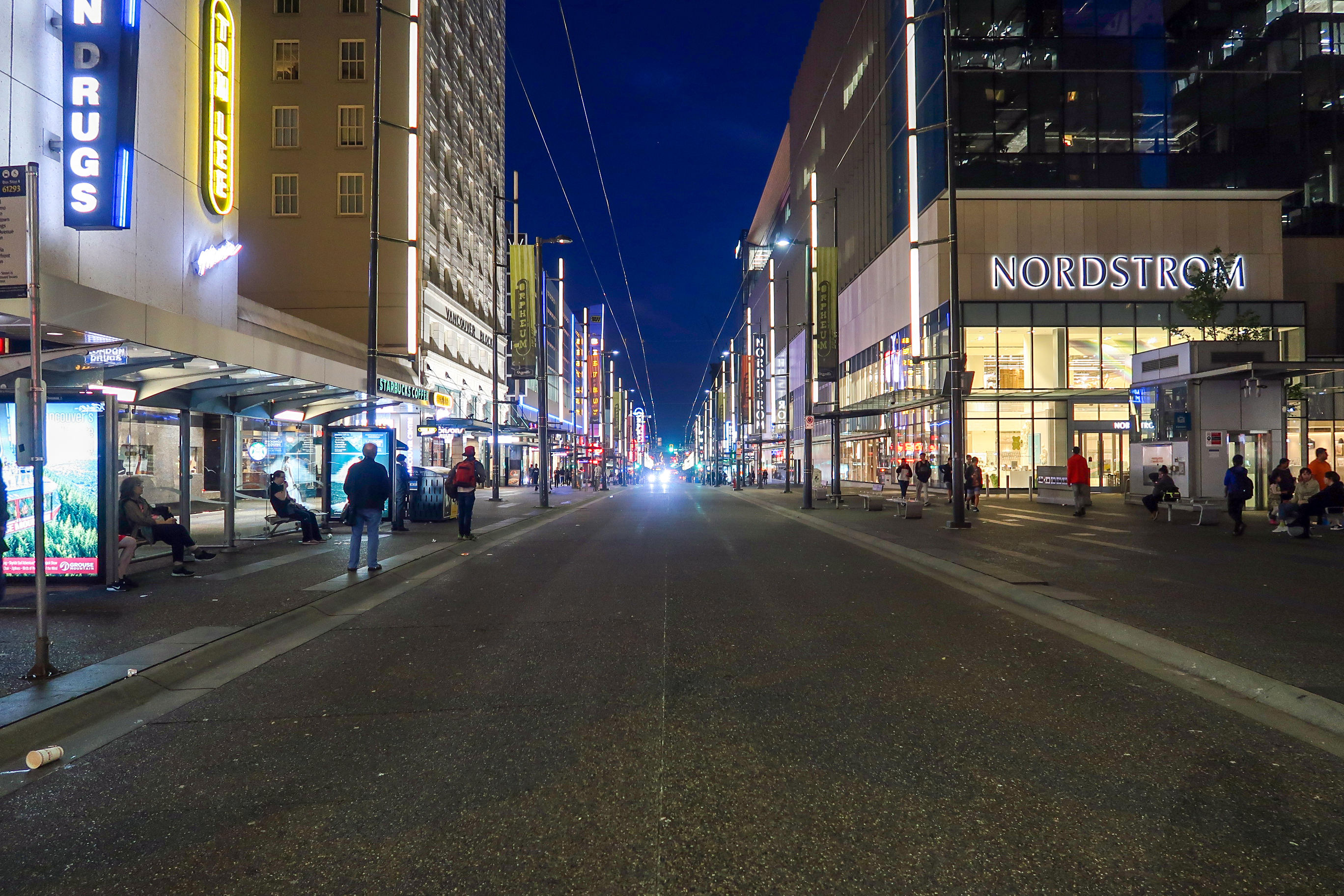
- Night view of Granville Street, Downtown (2018)
- Part of: Highway 99
- Namesake: Granville Leveson-Gower, 2nd Earl Granville
- Type: Street
- Length: 9.8 km (6.1 mi)
- Location: Vancouver, British Columbia
- Nearest metro station: Granville; Vancouver City Centre
- South end: SW Marine Drive
- Major junctions: 70th Avenue; 41st Avenue; Broadway; Seymour Street/Howe Street; Georgia Street; Hastings Street
- North end: Cordova Street

Other
- Known for: Shopping districts, Granville Entertainment District, Granville Mall, Granville Island, South Granville

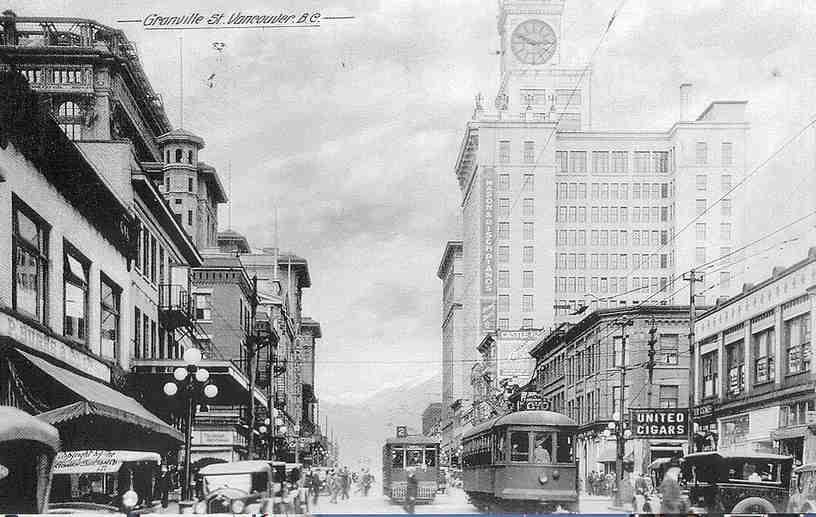
Streetcars on Granville in 1928

Granville Street is a major street in Vancouver, British Columbia, Canada, and part of Highway 99. Granville Street is most often associated with the Granville Entertainment District and the Granville Mall. This street also cuts through residential neighbourhoods like Shaughnessy and Marpole via the Granville Street Bridge.

== Location ==
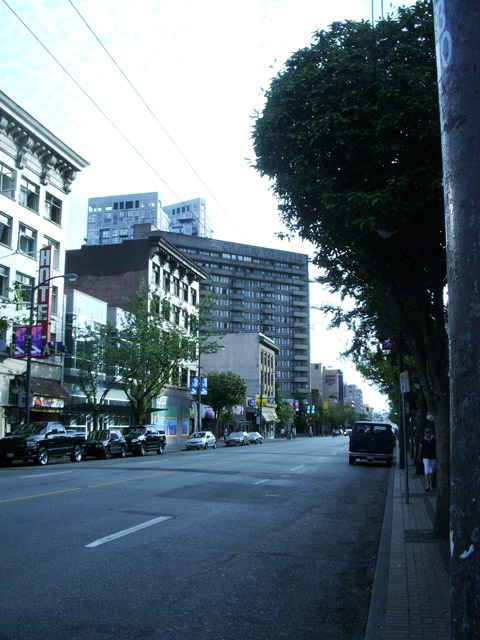
A southbound view of Granville Street in Downtown Vancouver

Granville Street runs generally north–south through the centre of Vancouver, passing through several neighbourhoods and commercial areas, differing appreciably in their land value and the wealth of their residents.

Granville runs northeast–southwest:

- through Downtown Vancouver from the waterfront area (including Waterfront station) at West Cordova Street to Robson Street
- through a pedestrian-friendly area known as the Granville Mall with part of it formally designated as the Granville Entertainment District (ending at the Granville Street Bridge); here, numerous shops, restaurants, and the city's top dance clubs, bars and entertainment venues are located
- over the Granville Street Bridge
- over Granville Island (located under the bridge)

Then, Granville Street runs north–south:

- through South Granville Rise, extending approximately from 4th Avenue to 16th Avenue, crossing West Broadway
- through Shaughnessy (from 16th Avenue to 41st Avenue)
- near Kerrisdale and Oakridge (Granville borders both neighbourhoods from 41st Avenue to 57th Avenue; unofficially, Kerrisdale begins at 33rd Avenue)
- through Marpole (from 57th Avenue to 70th Avenue; 70th Avenue becomes Southwest Marine Drive west of Granville)
- near the Fraser River, where it merges with another section of South-West Marine Drive

Finally, Granville Street ends near the Fraser River at the approximate location of 72nd Ave., then merges with Southwest Marine Drive and continues southeasterly towards the Arthur Laing Bridge that leads to Richmond and the Vancouver International Airport.

== History ==
=== 19th century ===
The community was known as "Gastown" (Gassy's Town) after its first citizen - Jack Deighton, known as "Gassy" Jack. "To gas" is period English slang for "to boast and to exaggerate". In 1870, the community was laid out as the "township of Granville" but everybody called it Gastown. The name Granville honours Granville Leveson-Gower, 2nd Earl Granville, who was British Secretary of State for the Colonies at the time of local settlement.

In 1886, it was incorporated as the city of Vancouver, named after Captain George Vancouver, who accompanied James Cook on his voyage to the West Coast and subsequently spent two years exploring and charting the West Coast.

=== 20th century ===
Towards the middle of the twentieth century, the downtown portion of Granville Street had become a flourishing centre for entertainment, known for its cinemas (built along the "Theatre Row", from the Granville Bridge to where Granville Street intersects Robson Street), restaurants, clubs, the Vogue and Orpheum theatres, and, later, arcades, pizza parlours, pawn stores, pornography shops and strip clubs.

By the late 1990s, Granville Street suffered gradual deterioration and many movie theatres, such as "The Plaza, Caprice, Paradise, [and] Granville Centre [...] have all closed for good", writes Dmitrios Otis in his article "The Last Peep Show". In the early 2000s, the news of the upcoming 2010 Winter Olympic Games, to be hosted in Whistler, a series of gentrification projects, still ongoing as of 2006, had caused the shutdown of many more businesses that had heretofore become landmarks of the street and of the city.

=== 21st century ===
Also, Otis writes that "once dominated by movie theatres, pinball arcades, and sex shops [Downtown Granville is being replaced] by nightclubs and bars, as [... it] transforms into a booze-based 'Entertainment District'." In April 2005, Capitol 6, a beloved 1920s-era movie theatre complex (built in 1921 and restored and reopened in 1977) closed its doors, leaving the seven-screen Granville 7 Cinemas at 855 Granville Street as the last movie house on Theatre Row until it also shut down on 4 November 2012. By August 2005, Movieland Arcade, located at 906 Granville Street became "the last home of authentic, 8 mm 'peep show' film booths in the world". On 7 July 2005, the Granville Book Company, a popular and independently owned bookstore was forced to close due to the rising rents and regulations the city began imposing in the early 2000s in order to "clean up" the street by the 2010 Olympics and combat Vancouver's "No Fun City" image.

While proponents of the Granville gentrification project in general (and the 2010 Olympics in specific) claim that the improvements made to the street will only benefit its residents, the customers frequenting the clubs and the remaining theatres and cinemas, maintain that the project is a temporary solution, since the closing down of the less "classy" businesses, and the build-up of Yaletown-style condominiums in their place, will not eliminate the unwanted pizzerias, corner-stores and pornography shops - and their patrons - but will simply displace them elsewhere (an issue reminiscent of the city's long-standing inability to solve the problems of the DTES).

== Major intersections ==
The entire route is in Vancouver.

km	mi	Destinations	Notes
−0.5	−0.31	Grant McConachie Way (to Arthur Laing Bridge) / Southwest Marine Drive – Vancouver International Airport	Interchange
0.0	0.0	Southwest Marine Drive	Granville Street southern terminus; roadway continues as Southwest Marine Drive
0.4	0.25	Highway 99 south (West 70th Avenue) – Tsawwassen ferry terminal, Canada–United States border	South end of Highway 99 concurrency
1.6	0.99	West 57th Avenue	
2.4	1.5	West 49th Avenue	
3.2	2.0	Highway 99 south (West 41st Avenue) – Tsawwassen ferry terminal, Canada–United States border	Alternate Highway 99 connection between Oak Street and Granville Street
4.1	2.5	West 33rd Avenue	
4.9	3.0	King Edward Avenue	
5.8	3.6	West 16th Avenue	
6.2	3.9	West 12th Avenue	
8.1	5.0	Highway 7 east (West Broadway) – Burnaby, Maple Ridge	Highway 7 western terminus
7.0	4.3	West 4th Avenue / Fir Street	Interchange; West 4th Avenue is southbound exit and northbound entrance; Fir Street is southbound exit only
7.0– 7.9	4.3– 4.9	Granville Street Bridge over False Creek	
7.9– 8.1	4.9– 5.0	Seymour Street / Howe Street (Highway 99 north) / Pacific Street – Horseshoe Bay ferry terminal, Whistler	Interchange; northbound Highway 99 follows Seymour Street, southbound Highway 99 follows Howe Street
8.4	5.2	Davie Street	
8.7	5.4	Nelson Street	One-way, southeast-bound; provides access to the Cambie Bridge
8.9	5.5	Smithe Street	One-way, northwest-bound; provides access from the Cambie Bridge
8.9	5.5	Granville Mall south end (transit only)	
9.1	5.7	Robson Street	
9.3	5.8	Highway 99 north (Georgia Street)	Former Highway 1A south / Highway 99A; near Vancouver City Centre station
9.4	5.8	Dunsmuir Street	One-way, northwest-bound; near Granville station
9.6	6.0	Pender Street	
9.7	6.0	Granville Mall north end (transit only)	
9.7	6.0	Hastings Street	Former Highway 7A
9.8	6.1	Cordova Street	Across from Waterfront station
1.000 mi = 1.609 km; 1.000 km = 0.621 mi: Concurrency terminus; HOV only; Incomplete access; Route transition

== Gallery ==
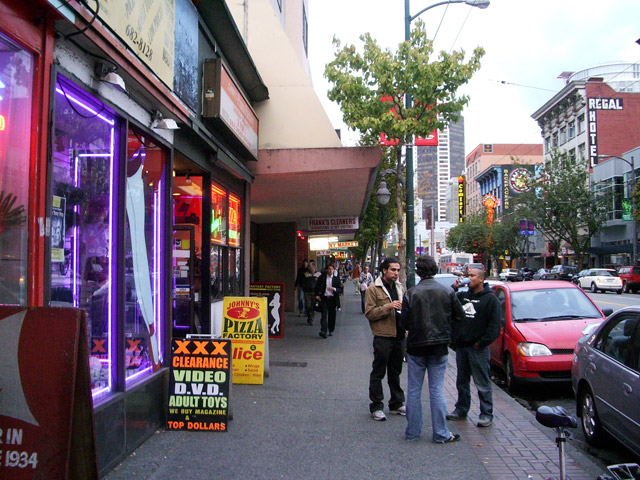
The last few remaining pornography and peep show stores on Granville Street. Circa 2005.

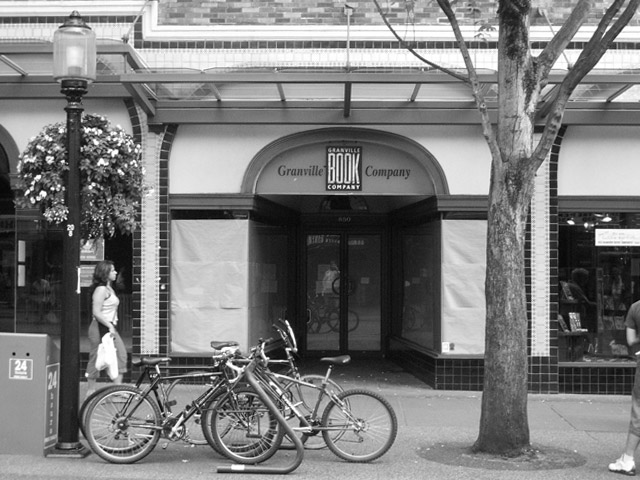
The shutdown Granville Book Company, an independently owned Granville Street bookstore. Circa 2005.

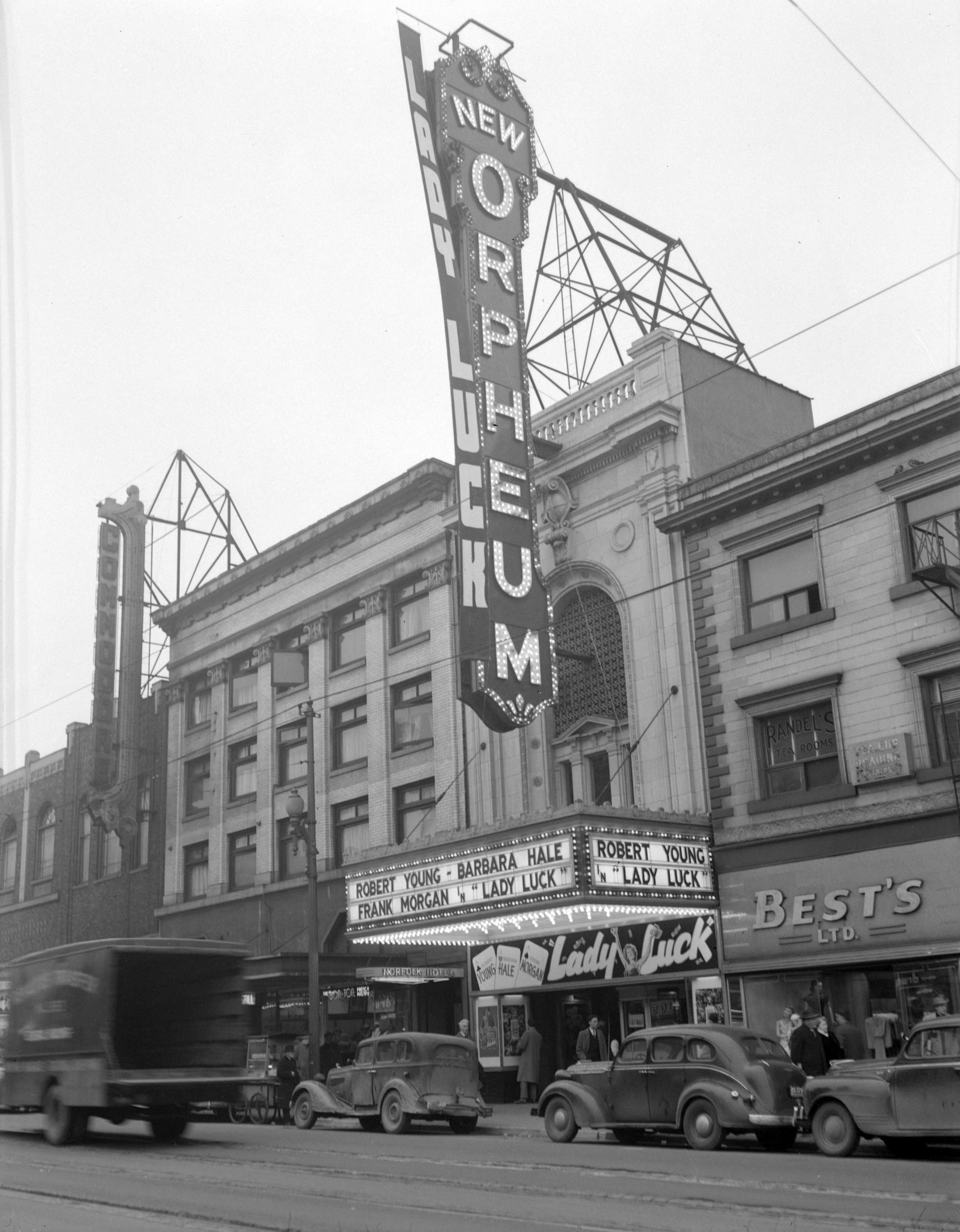
The Orpheum Theatre with advertising for the movie Lady Luck; note the Commodore Ballroom on the left. Circa 1946.

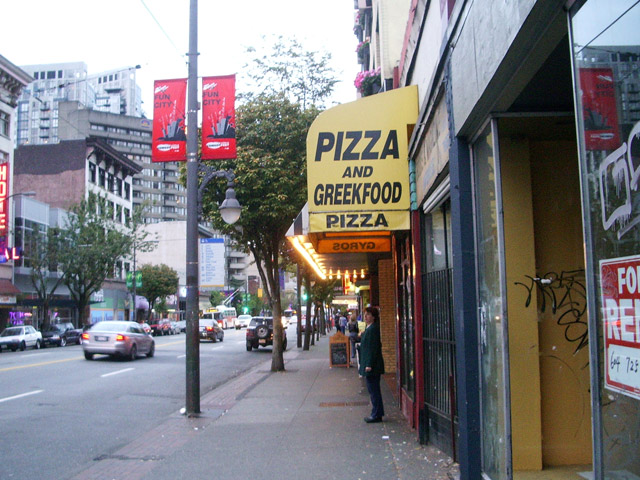
Small businesses on Granville Street. Circa 2005.

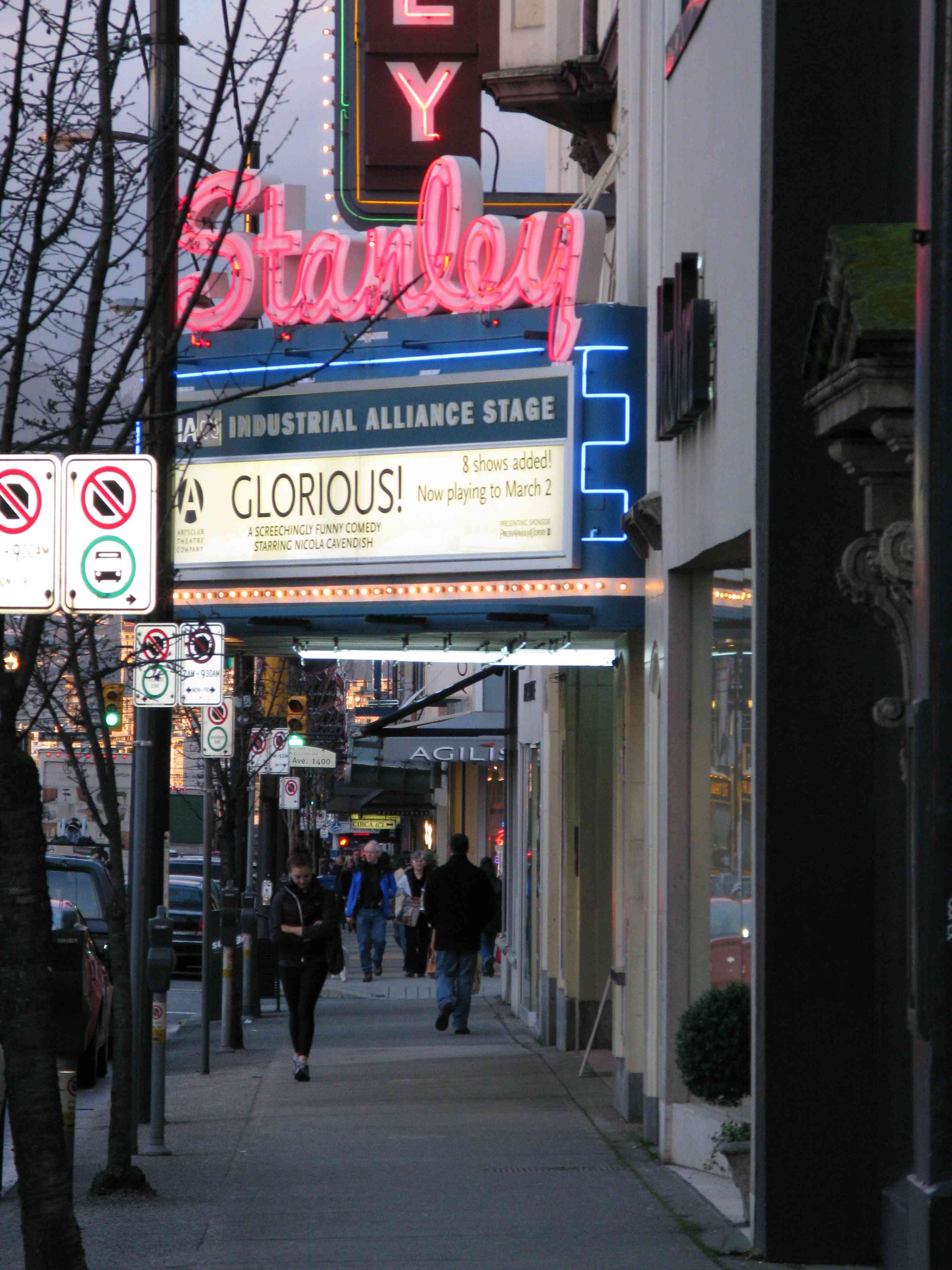
Looking North at 12th and Granville past the Stanley Industrial Alliance Stage

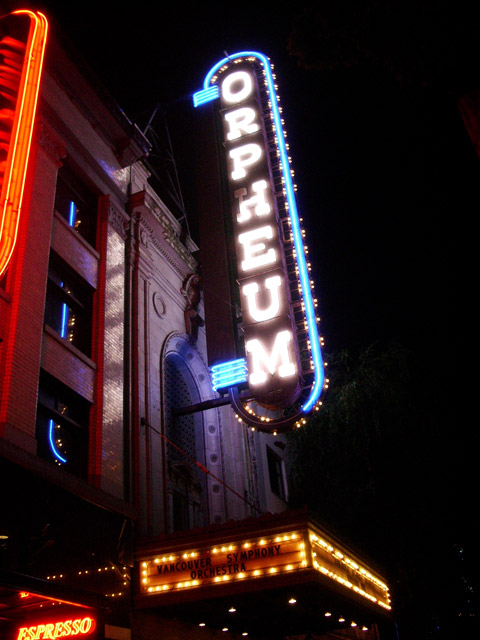
The Orpheum Theatre, advertising the Vancouver Symphony Orcherstra

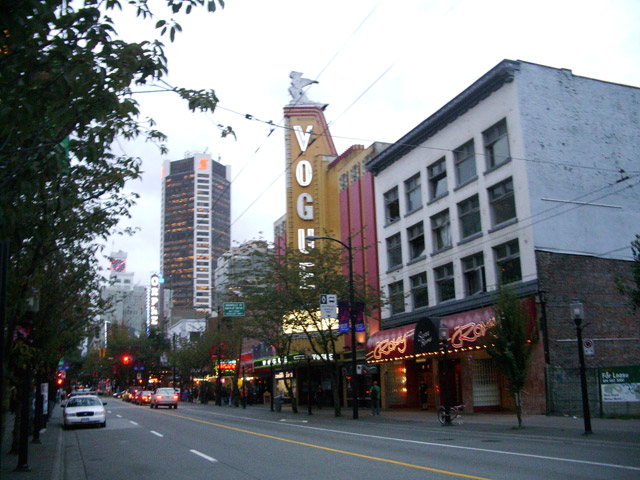
The Vogue Theatre

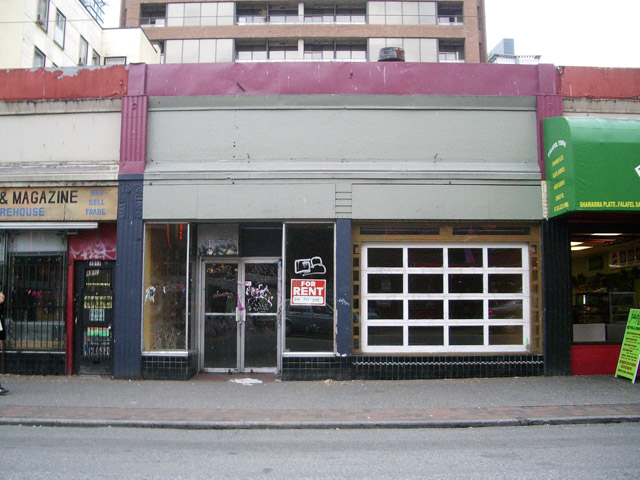
Empty storefronts circa 2005

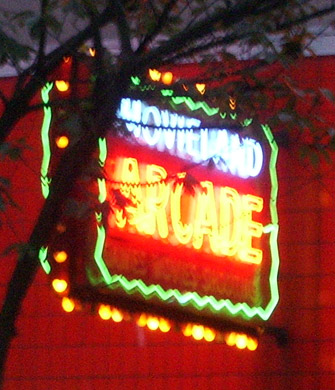
Movieland Arcade street sign

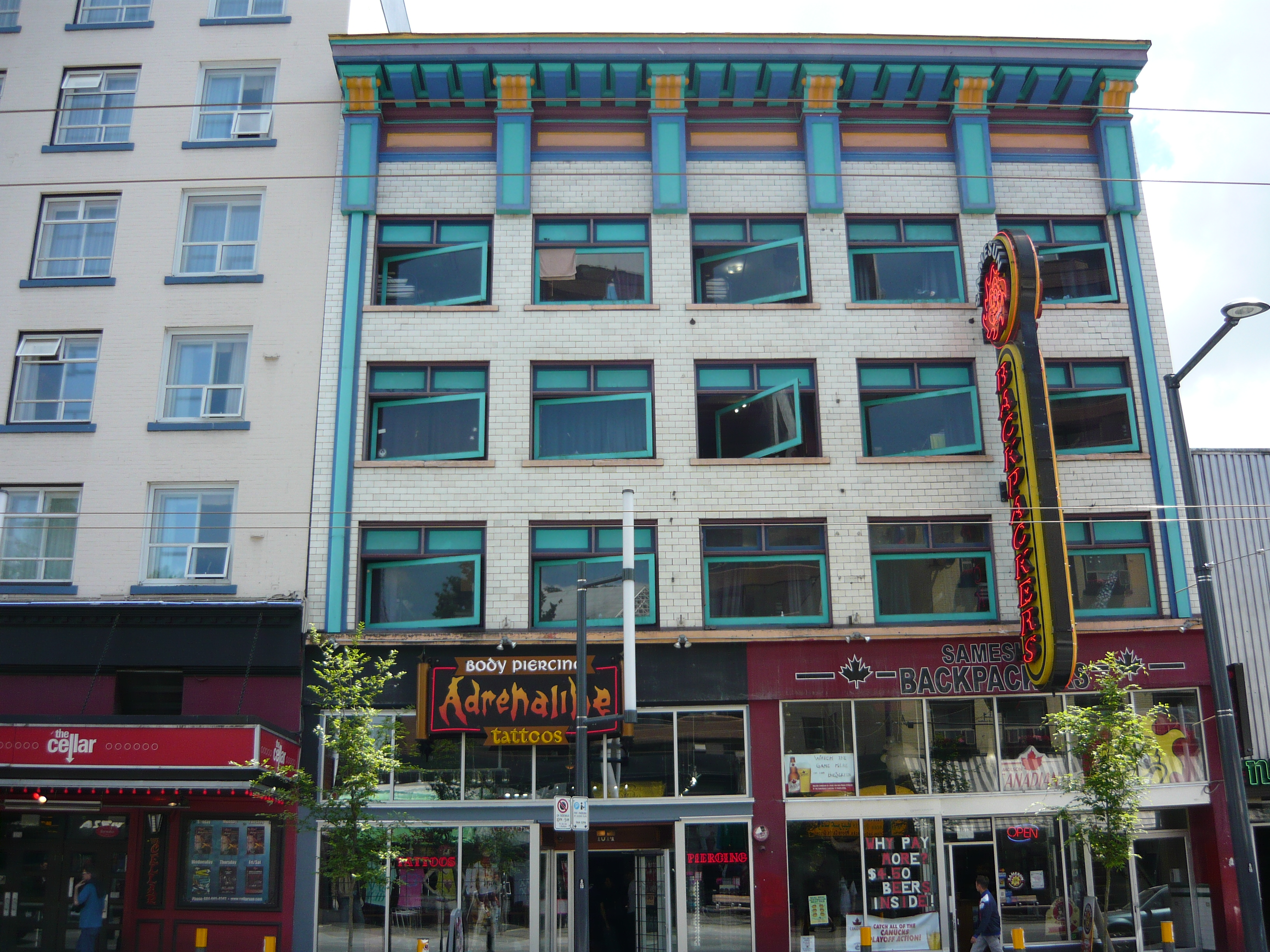
SameSun Backpackers' Lodge

== Cultural references ==
- Granville Street is the second-most expensive property in the game Canadian Monopoly.

== References and further reading ==
=== Sources ===
- "Granville Street Redesign." 14 June 2007. City of Vancouver.
- Stamp, Graeme. "Granville Street Redesign." 18 November 2004. A letter from the Chair and Chief Elected Officer to Mayor Larry Campbell.

=== History ===
- "1920s Granville Street." 2005. Tom Lee Music Co. Selected photographs of Granville Street from the Vancouver Public Library Archives.
- "Granville Street Redesign History." 14 June 2007. City of Vancouver.
- "Rezoning of 8405–8435 Granville Street." 19 September 1997. City of Vancouver.
- City Lights etc video shows Theatre Row lights at night in 1964. City of Vancouver Archives channel, YouTube.

=== Listings and tour guides ===
- "Granville Street." 5 February 2005. Eve Vancouver. A thorough listing of restaurants and businesses on Granville street.
- "Granville Street Clubs – Nightlife - Vancouver Night clubs, Vancouver Bars, Granville Street Shopping." 2006. Weiland Media.
- "Granville Street Walk." 27 August 2001. Walk Vancouver. An (outdated) virtual tour of Granville Street's downtown portion.
- "Vancouver's Granville Street Art Galleries, Restaurants and Shops." 2006. BCPassport. A selected listing of South Granville businesses.

=== Searchable resources ===
- Granville Street on Google Maps normal | satellite | hybrid
- "Google Image Search: Granville Street." The search reveals many historical and current photographs of Granville Streets, its locations and denizens.
- "Search Photographs" 29 June 2009. City of Vancouver Archives. Enter "Granville" or "Granville street" (without the quotation marks) into the "Keyword(s)" field.
