= Granville Mall, Vancouver =

Granville Mall
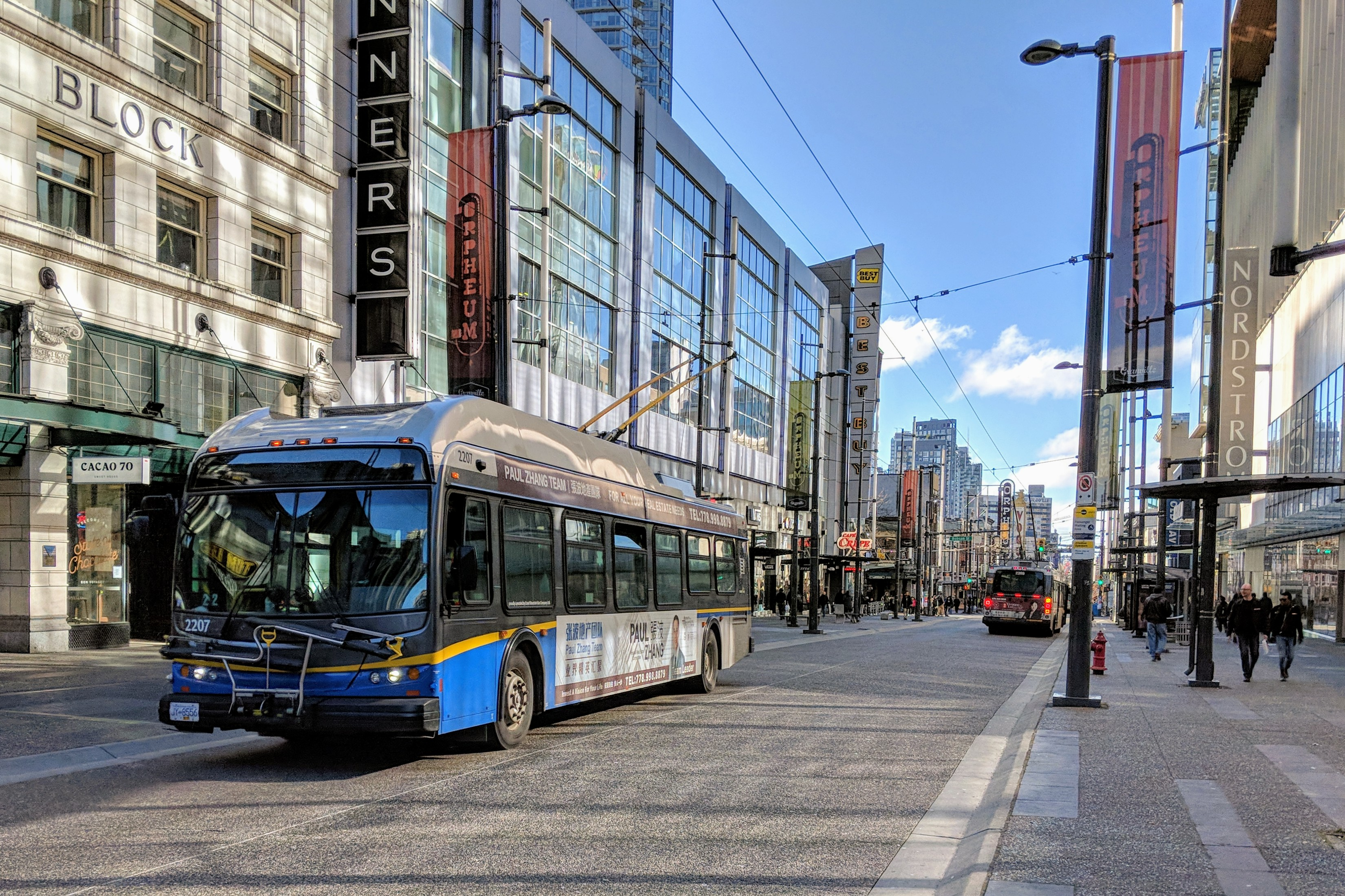
- A northbound trolley bus on the Granville Mall
- Interactive map of Granville Mall
- Coordinates: 49.28309°N 123.11724°W
- Locale: Downtown Vancouver
- Opened: 1974, 2010
- Rebuilt: 2006–10
- SkyTrain stations: Granville; Vancouver City Centre
- TransLink buses: 4, 7, 10, 14, 16, 17, 20, 50

The Granville Mall is a transit mall and pedestrian zone in Vancouver, British Columbia, Canada. It comprises the section of Granville Street in Downtown Vancouver between Hastings and Smithe Streets. Most routes that service the mall are primarily trolley buses operated by TransLink. In addition to bus service, the Granville Mall can be accessed by SkyTrain from either Granville and Vancouver City Centre stations of the Expo and Canada Lines, respectively.

== History ==
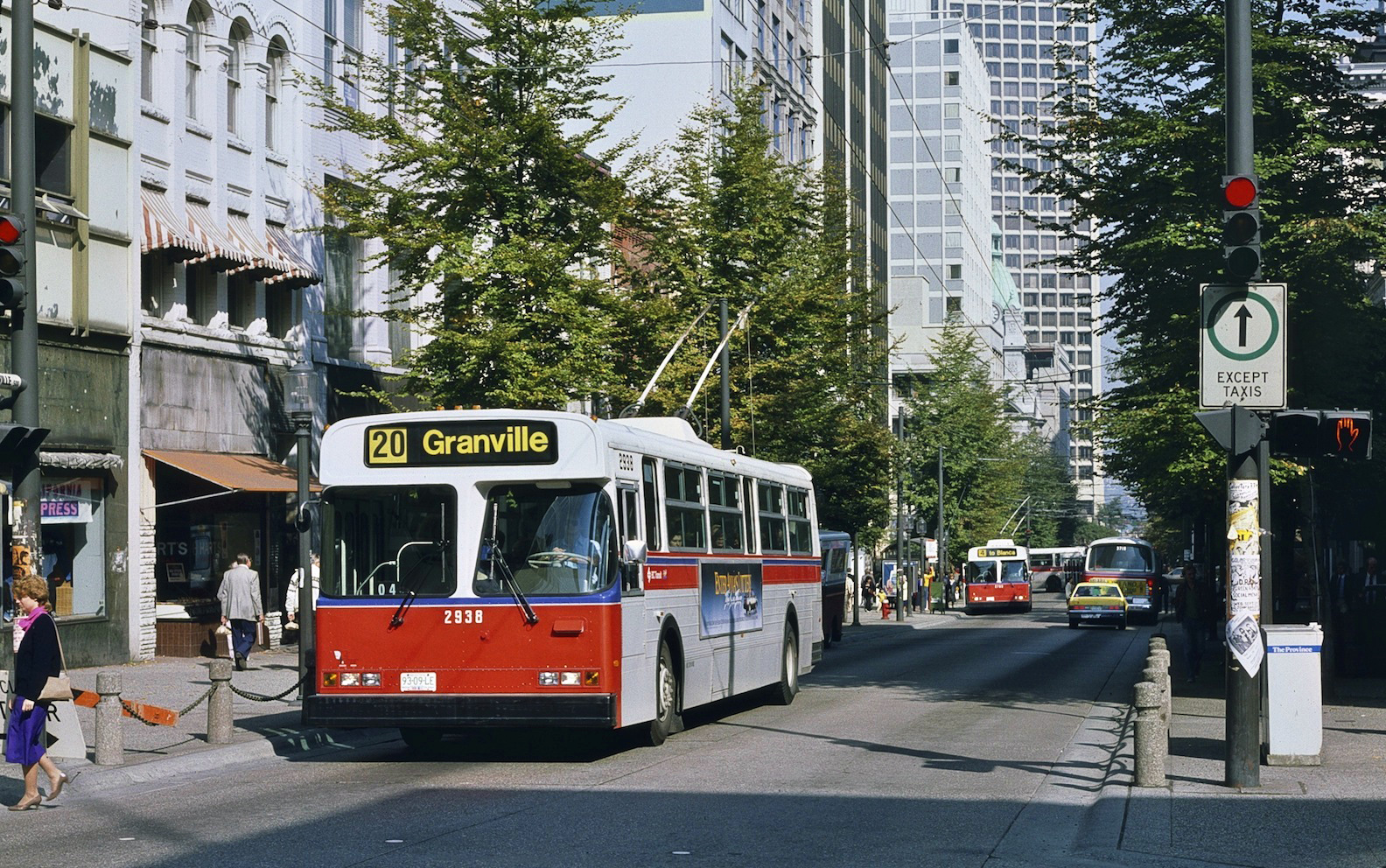
A trolley bus on the old mall in 1985

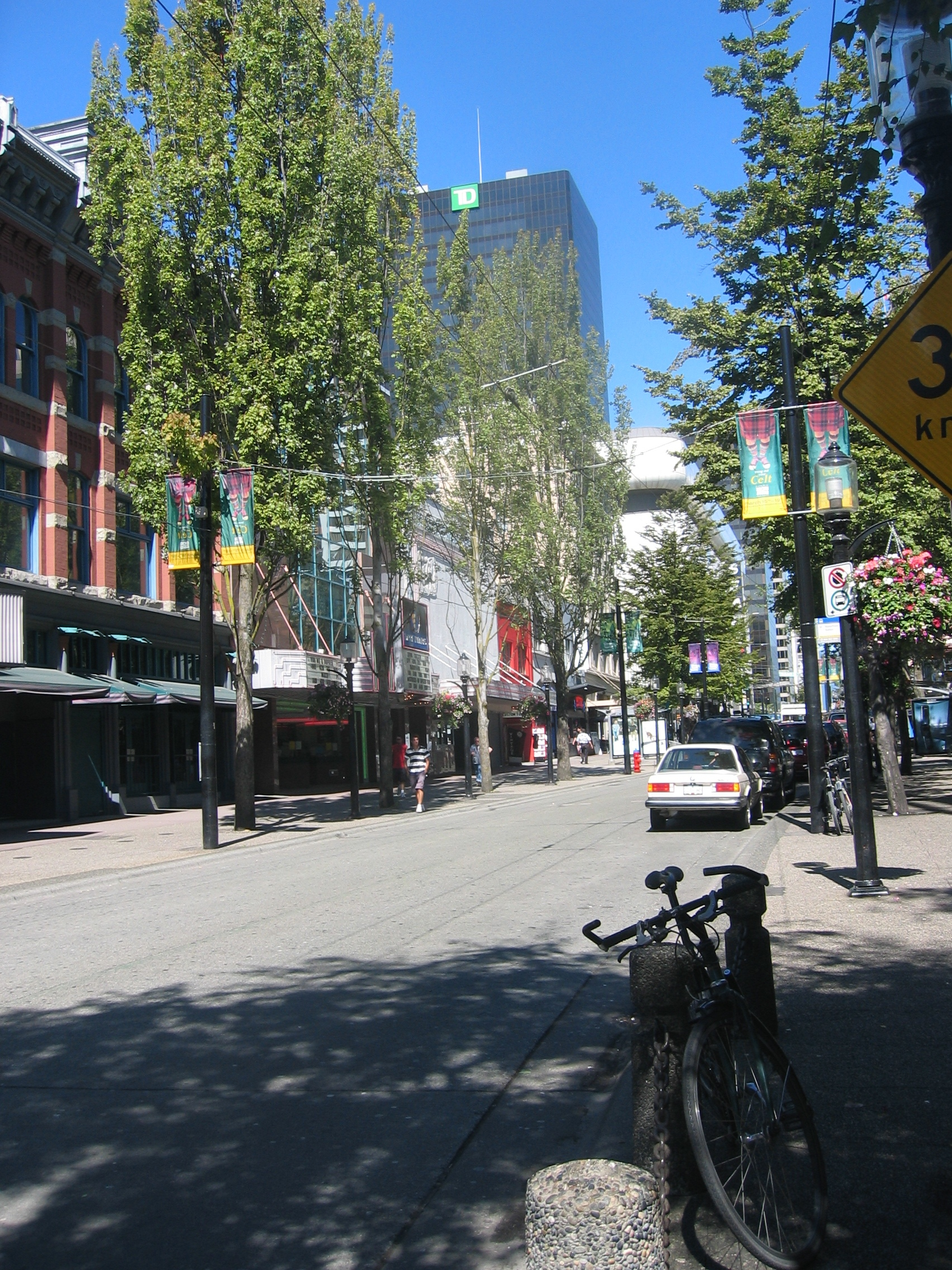
Granville Mall in 2006; this portion south of Robson Street remained open during Canada Line construction.

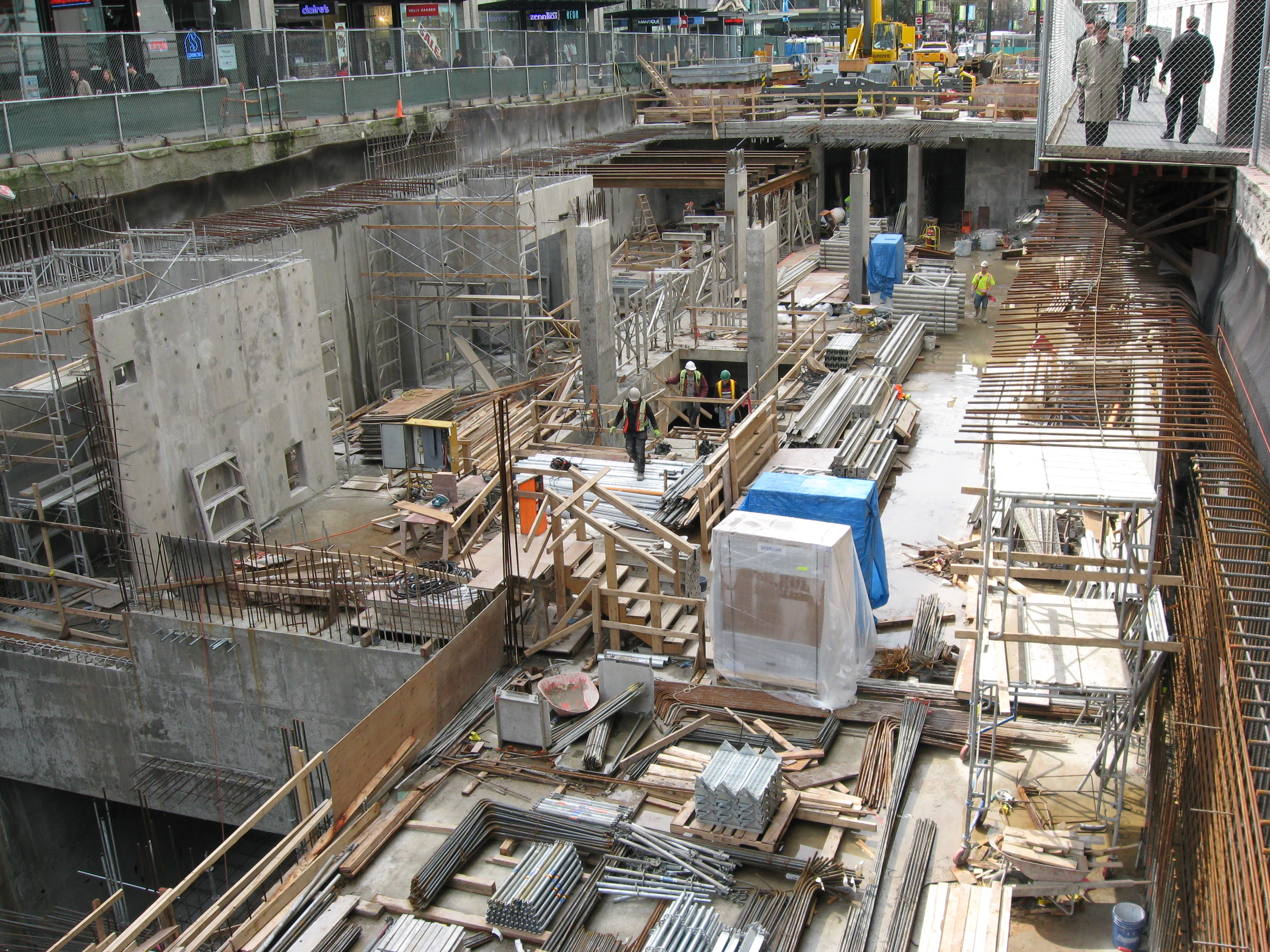
Canada Line subway station construction at the mall in 2008

The idea of closing off a section of Granville Street to automobile traffic arose after the city withdrew its freeway plan in 1968 because of community opposition. The city concluded that automobile use within downtown should be restricted to avoid overloading the area's street network and subsequently designated the section of Granville between Hastings and Nelson streets a pedestrian and transit mall. The Granville Mall opened for service on September 15, 1974.

The Downtown Vancouver Association sought to reopen Granville between Nelson and Georgia Streets to general traffic, and the city proceeded with that proposal in 1987 on a trial basis. The trial was declared unsuccessful and cancelled the following year, although the city reopened one block between Nelson and Smithe Streets to general traffic in 1989 and widened the section to four lanes.

On April 24, 2006, a temporary multi-year closure of the mall to all traffic, including transit buses, between Robson Street and Hastings Street began, to allow construction of the Canada Line subway and Vancouver City Centre station. During this closure, buses were rerouted to Seymour Street (northbound), Howe Street (southbound, routes crossing the Granville Street Bridge), and Richards Street (southbound, routes within downtown). As part of the construction, the 800, 600, and 500 blocks of Granville (between Smithe and Robson and then again between Georgia and Pender) were open to all traffic northbound, including on-street metered parking.

Before its temporary closure, the Granville Mall had been used by over 1,900 buses (90% electric trolley buses) and at least 47,500 transit riders on weekdays. Following studies and consultations, Vancouver City Council decided in the second quarter of 2006 to carry out a redesign of the mall after completion of the Canada Line subway under the street. Trolleybus service on the mall resumed on September 7, 2010; the buses continue to use Howe and Seymour streets in the evenings on weekends and holidays.

== Entertainment district ==
The central portion of the Granville Mall and nearby streets play host to the city's primary urban retail and adult nightlife district after the evening rush hour. Known simply as the Granville Entertainment District, it contains bars, dance clubs, venues, restaurants, hotels, and shops that are open daily until late into the night and extend to the early hours of morning on weekends. The Entertainment District was created by the city's zoning policies to concentrate adult nightlife operations, which had been scattered throughout the greater downtown peninsula.
