= Cambie =

Cambie may refer to:

- Henry John Cambie (1836–1928), Ireland-born engineer of the Canadian Pacific Railway chiefly responsible for having Vancouver, British Columbia, designated the terminus of Canada's transcontinental railroad

Things named for Henry John Cambie

- Cambie Street, Vancouver
- Cambie Bridge, Vancouver
- Cambie Road and Henry James Cambie Secondary School in Richmond, British Columbia
- East Cambie, Richmond
- West Cambie, Richmond
- Aberdeen station (TransLink), formerly "Cambie Station", in Richmond, British Columbia
