= 1915 Vancouver bridge arson attack =

Act of sabotage in Vancouver

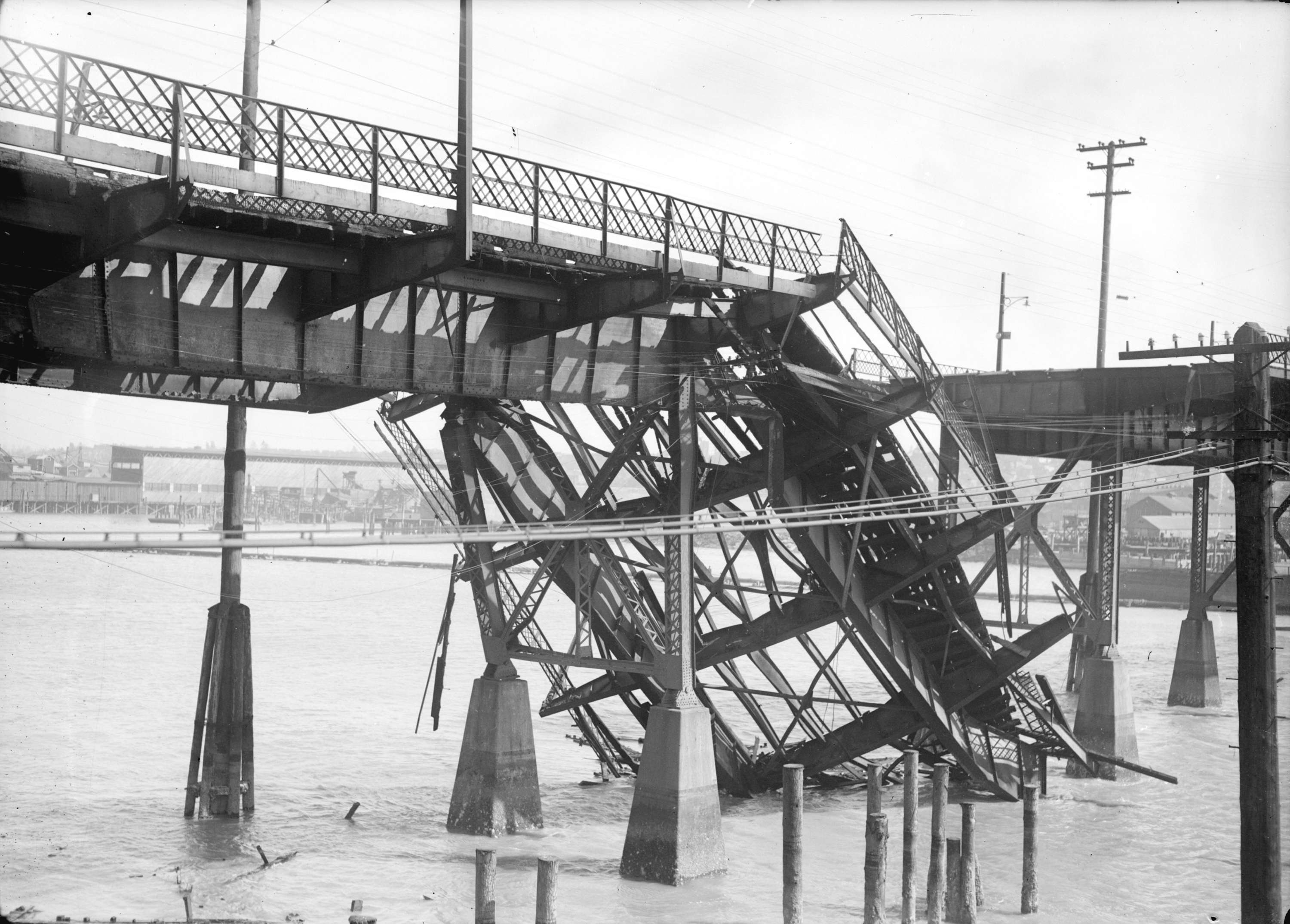
- A section of the bridge collapsed into False Creek after the fire
- Location: Granville Street Bridge, Connaught Bridge
- Date: April 29 1915; 4:29 for Connaught Bridge (PST)
- Attack type: Sabotage
- Deaths: 0
- Injuries: 0
- Perpetrator: Imperial German agents
- Motive: sabotage

The Vancouver bridge arson attack took place on April 29, 1915, when two key bridges in the West Coast Canadian city of Vancouver, Granville Street Bridge and Connaught Bridge, were set on fire.

== Background ==
The Connaught Bridge was completed in 1911 for $740,000, opening to traffic on May 24, 1911. The following year, Canada's Governor General, the Prince Arthur, Duke of Connaught and Strathearn, accompanied by the Duchess and their daughter, Princess Patricia, visited Vancouver to officiate at a ceremony renaming the new crossing as the "Connaught Bridge" on September 20, 1912. The name "Connaught" never caught on, and most people continued to call it simply the "Cambie Street Bridge", after the street that runs across it, Cambie Street, named for pioneer Vancouver resident Henry John Cambie.

== Fire ==
The fires happened on April 29, 1915. The American media widely reported that the fires were set by German immigrants celebrating the Imperial German victory over the Canadians at Ypres, Belgium. The fire on the caused a 24.4 metres (80 ft) span of the Connaught Bridge to collapse and caused about $90,000 in damage.

== Arrests ==
Four Germans were arrested and interned: Baron Rochus von Luttwitz (related to the Imperial German Kaiser), Dr. Otto Grumert (a founder of the Bank of Vancouver), Paul Koop and Frederich Spritzel.

== See also ==
- 1915 Vanceboro international bridge bombing
- List of German-sponsored acts of sabotage in World War I

== Bibliography ==
Notes

References

- Davis, Chuck (1997). The Greater Vancouver Book: An Urban Encyclopedia. Linkman Press. ISBN 9781896846002. - Total pages: 882
- "Flames Break Out On Two Bridges; Four Germans Are Arrested; War Reports Vary". Honolulu Star-Bulletin. Honolulu, Hawaii: P.T. Gialanella. April 29, 1915. pp. 1–16. ISSN 2326-1137. OCLC 8807359.
- "Alien Enemies Burn Bridge in Vancouver". The Omineca Miner. Hazelton, BC. May 1, 1915. pp. 1–4.
- "Bridge Fire Make Vancouver Dangerous Place For Germans". The Tacoma Times. Tacoma, Pierce, Washington. May 3, 1915. pp. 1–8. ISSN 2158-4729. OCLC 17347623.
- West, E.A. (1985). "Cambie Bridge: The Official Opening – December 8, 1985" (PDF). City of Vancouver. Archived from the original (PDF) on November 16, 2011.
