= Bridgeport, British Columbia =

Neighbourhood in Richmond, British Columbia, Canada

Bridgeport
- Neighbourhood
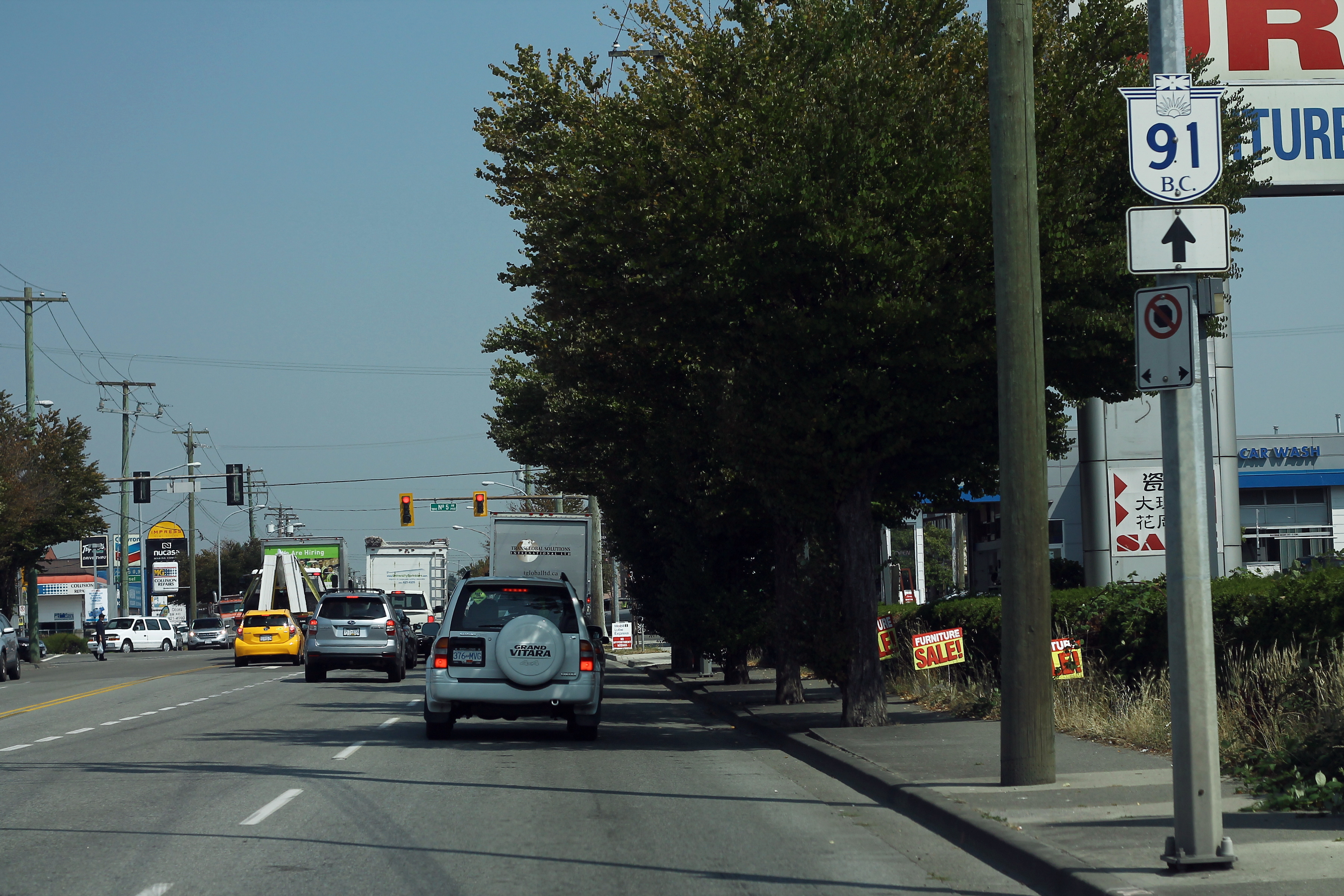
- Bridgeport Road, west of No. 5 Road

- Location of Bridgeport in Richmond

- Location in Metro Vancouver
- Coordinates: 49°11′40.5″N 123°06′09.0″W
- Country: Canada
- Province: British Columbia
- Region: Metro Vancouver
- City: Richmond

Area
  - Total: 5.13 km^{2} (1.98 sq mi)
- Elevation: 1 m (3.3 ft)

Population (2021)
  - Total: 4,140
- Time zone: UTC−07:00 (Pacific Time)
- Forward sortation area: V6X
- Area codes: 604, 778, 236, 672

Bridgeport is a mostly industrial neighbourhood in Richmond, British Columbia. The neighbourhood is bound by the Fraser River to the north of Mitchell Island, the Agricultural Land Reserve to the east, No. 4 Road to the west, and Bridgeport Industrial Park in the south.

The only residential area of Bridgeport is the Tait area located on the western end of the neighbourhood.

== Demographics ==
The 2021 census found that English was spoken as mother tongue by 49.6% of the population. The next most common mother tongue language was Cantonese, spoken by 17.5% of the population, followed by Mandarin at 7.4%.

Panethnic groups in the Bridgeport neighbourhood (2021)
Panethnic group	2021
Panethnic group	%
East Asian (Note: Statistic includes total responses of "Chinese", "Korean", and "Japanese" under visible minority section on census.)	46.5%
European (Note: Statistic includes all persons that did not make up part of a visible minority or an indigenous identity.)	11.7%
Southeast Asian (Note: Statistic includes total responses of "Filipino" and "Southeast Asian" under visible minority section on census.)	20.7%
South Asian	14.4%
Middle Eastern (Note: Statistic includes total responses of "West Asian" and "Arab" under visible minority section on census.)	0.7%
Latin American	0.4%
African	0%
Other/multiracial (Note: Statistic includes total responses of "Visible minority, n.i.e." and "Multiple visible minorities" under visible minority section on census.)	4.4%
Total population	100%
Note: Totals greater than 100% due to multiple origin responses

== Transportation ==
Vehicular travel dominates the neighbourhood, with 72.4% of residents driving to work and 8.3% commuting as passengers. Public transit serves 12.9% of the population, while active transit remains minimal, with only 3.7% walking and 1.8% cycling to work.

=== Public Transport ===
Translink serves bus routes through Bridgeport, providing the neighbourhood with direct connections to Bridgeport Station, which is within walking distance to the neighbourhood, Metrotown. These bus routes include the 407, 430.

=== Cycling ===
Bridgerport features some designated bike routes that accommodate local commuting. These include River Drive, Tait Waterfront, Bridgeport Recreational Trail, and the Knight Street Bridge.

== Education ==
The Bridgeport area is home to Tait Elementary School, while secondary school students attend Cambie Secondary School in the adjacent East Cambie neighourhood.

== Parks and Recreation ==
Bridgeport is served by the Cambie Community Centre in East Cambie, a central hub for local recreation.

The neighbourhood features a few parks, including Tait Waterfront Park, Bridgeport Industrial Park, and Bridgeport Trail.
