= List of German-sponsored acts of sabotage in World War I =

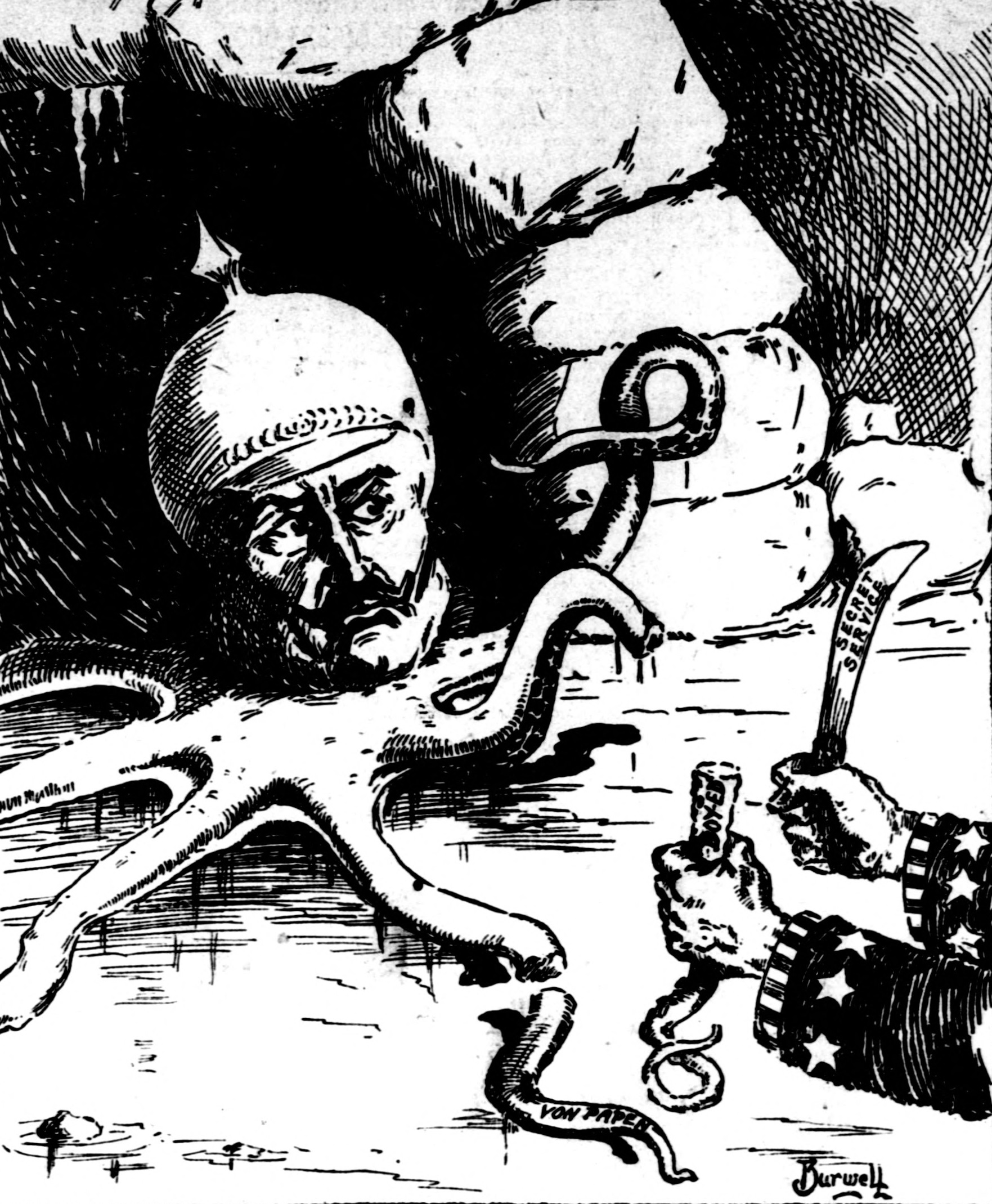
1915, Burwell Cartoon on German spies in America

During World War I Imperial Germany funded or inspired a number of sabotage acts in America and abroad. It was hoped that these attacks would harm the war efforts of the Allies or Entente Powers. Spy heads like the American-based German Military Attaché Franz von Papen received money to fund these sabotage activities and distributed them to local actors or German agents. In 1917 The New York Times reported that there were 10,000 German, Austro-Hungarian, Bulgarian, and Ottoman agents in America. While most of the attacks were amateurish and foiled by local law enforcement, some like the Black Tom explosion caused immense devastation.

== List of state-sponsored attacks ==
Date	Name	Location	Status	Notes	References
September 1914	Welland Canal Plot	Welland Canal, Canada	Attack was abandoned when its main plotter saw Canadian defences.		
1914–1917	Pencil bomb attacks	Allied shipping	The incendiary device ignited cargos when ships were far at sea. It was estimated that the pencil bombs destroyed $10 million (US$ 214 million in 2025) worth of cargo on 36 ships.		
April 29, 1915	1915 Vancouver bridge arson attack	Granville Street Bridge, Vancouver	Bridge is set on fire, with zero fatalities.		
April–October of 1915	Fay Bombing Plot	New York City	Spy ring arrested before implementation		
February 2, 1915	Vanceboro international bridge bombing	Saint Croix–Vanceboro Railway Bridge	Railway officials inspected the bridge following the bombing and discovered the damage was relatively minor, resulting in the bridge being out of service for only several days.		
WWI until arrest July 3, 1915	Muenter attacks	Senate reception room in the United States Capitol, Washington, D.C.; J. P. Morgan's house at East Island, Glen Cove, New York	In 1915, an agent planted a bomb that exploded in the US Capitol, shot Jack Morgan, and predicted the bombing of a steamship bound for England before committing suicide while in police custody.		
May 30, 1915	Harbor Island Bombing	Harbor Island, Seattle	Imperial German agents blew up a barge carrying 15 tons of refined gunpowder just off of Harbor Island, Seattle.		
April–October of 1915	German biological warfare sabotage program	American cattle industry	While the program was successful, it is unknown if any cattle were harmed.		
July 30, 1916	Black Tom explosion	New York City	Killed 7 people and destroyed some $20,000,000 ($590 million in 2025) worth of military goods.		
January 11, 1917	Kingsland explosion	Lyndhurst, New Jersey	In 4 hours, probably 500,000 pieces of 76 mm (3") high explosive shells were discharged.		

== Lone Wolf attacks ==
Date	Name	Location	Status	Notes	References
December 28, 1914	Rochambeau bomb plot	SS Rochambeau	Spy ring arrested before implementation		
June 21, 1915	Bomb attack of various Ontario targets by Detroit-based Charles Respa and Albert Kaltschmidt	Successful bombing of the Peabody Overall Co factory in Walkerville, Ontario.	Factory bombed, but a bomb placed at the Windsor Armoury failed to explode, saving the lives of 200 soldiers who were stationed there. On March 7, 1916, Respa was sentenced to life imprisonment. In 1917, ring leader and president of the Marine City Salt company, Albert Kaltschmidt, faced charges in America for attempting to bomb the Detroit Screw Works. Others charged were William M. Jarosh, Richard Herman, and Fritz A. Neef, general manager of the Eismann Magneto company.		

== See also ==
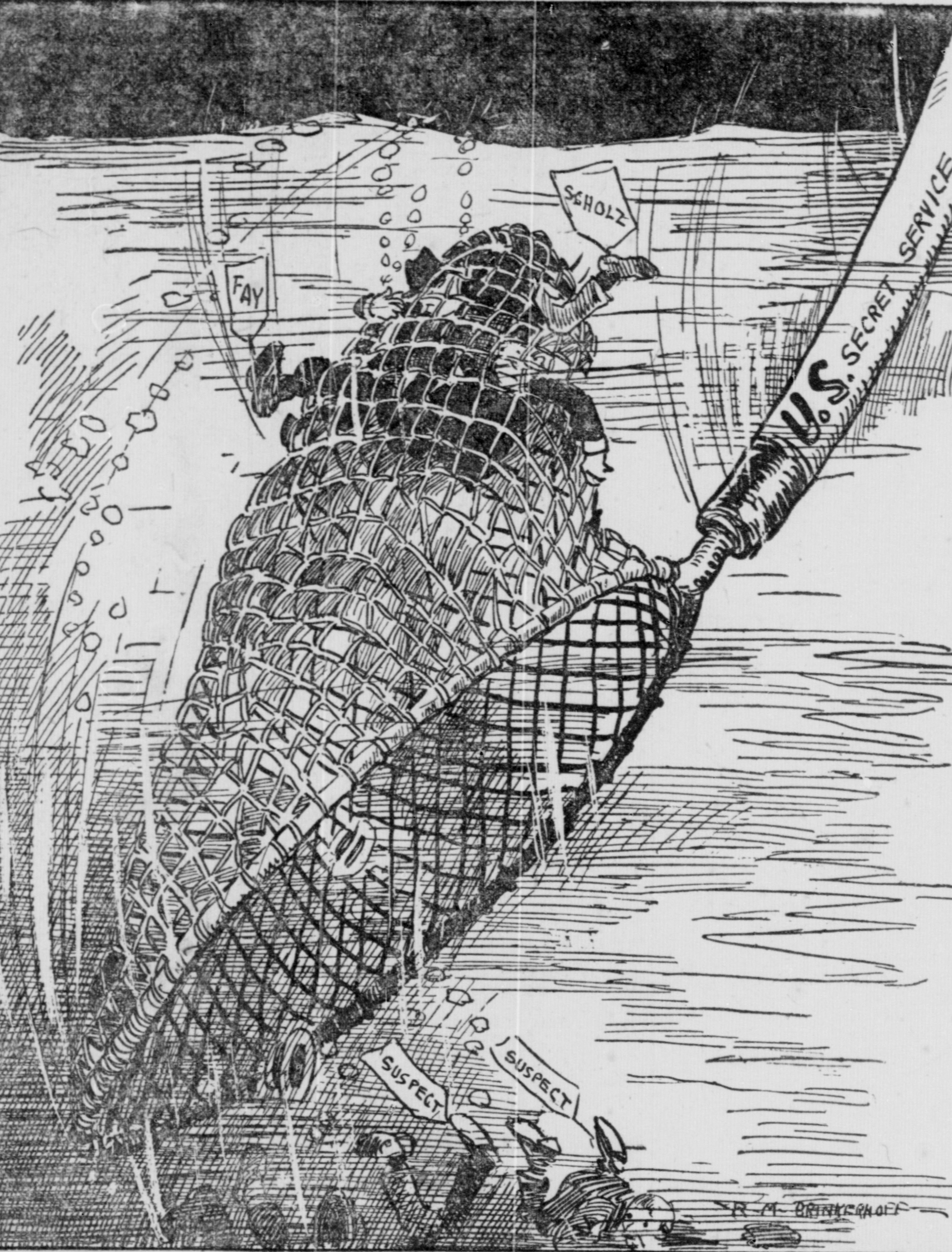
1915 Robert Moore Brinkerhoff cartoon showing US secret service rounding up German spies

- German war crimes
- War crimes in World War I
- Great Phenol Plot

== Bibliography ==
Notes

References

- "Police Frustrate German Attempt To Blow Up Ship". The Birmingham Age-Herald. Birmingham, AL. December 23, 1914. pp. 1–12. ISSN 2692-6318. OCLC 12607279 – via Library of Congress.
- Blum, Howard (2014). Dark Invasion 1915: Germany's Secret War and the Hunt for the First Terrorist Cell in America. Harper. ISBN 9780062307590.
- "Kaltschmidt and four others tried to wreck screwworks, is charge". The Detroit Times. Detroit, Wayne, Michigan: Detroit To-Day Co. May 22, 1917. pp. 1–8. ISSN 2688-9390. OCLC 9977557.
- R. R. Bowker (1916). Information: A Digest of Currect Events - Vol II 1916. R. R. Bowker. - Total pages: 692
- King, Gilbert (November 1, 2011). "Sabotage in New York Harbor". Smithsonian Magazine.
- Gilman, William (January 23, 2020). The Spy Trap. Wildside Press LLC. ISBN 9781479447725.
- "Flames Break Out On Two Bridges; Four Germans Are Arrested; War Reports Vary". Honolulu Star-Bulletin. Honolulu, Hawaii: P.T. Gialanella. April 29, 1915. pp. 1–16. ISSN 2326-1137. OCLC 8807359.
- MacDonnell, Francis (September 19, 1995). Insidious Foes: The Axis Fifth Column and the American Home Front. Oxford University Press. ISBN 9780199879915.
- Maag, Christopher (January 10, 2017). "Lyndhurst marks 100th anniversary of Kingsland explosion". The Record.
- "German Spies Active Here For Months". The New York Times. February 4, 1917. ISSN 1553-8095. OCLC 1645522.
- "Charge Germans in Powder Plot". The Tacoma Times. Tacoma, Pierce, Washington: Tacoma Times Pub. Co. June 21, 1915. pp. 1–8. ISSN 2158-4729. OCLC 17347623.
- Wheelis, Mark (17 September 1998). "First shots fired in biological warfare". Correspondence. Nature. 395 (6699): 213. Bibcode:1998Natur.395..213W. doi:10.1038/26089. PMID 9751039.
- von Feilitzsch, Heribert (2015). The Secret War on the United States in 1915. Henselstone Verlag LLC. ISBN 9780985031763.
