= Albert Kaltschmidt =

German-American industrialist and saboteur

- Born: Albert Carl Kaltschmidt; 1871; German Empire
- Died: Unknown
- Occupations: Industrialist; Saboteur
- Known for: Leader of pro-German sabotage group in WWI
- Allegiance: German Empire
- Conviction: Conspiracy
- Penalty: 4 years imprisonment (1917); $20,000 fine ($502,600 in 2025)

Details
- Imprisoned at: USP Leavenworth

Albert Kaltschmidt was a German immigrant who became a wealthy industrialist in the United States. During World War I, he was the leader of a pro-German Empire group. The lone wolf group (independent of Imperial Germany's spy network) was able to bomb a Canadian factory in 1915. Kaltschmidt was arrested for an attempt to bomb Detroit factories, and was convicted of conspiracy in 1917. He spent nearly four years in prison, after which he was deported.

== Business career ==
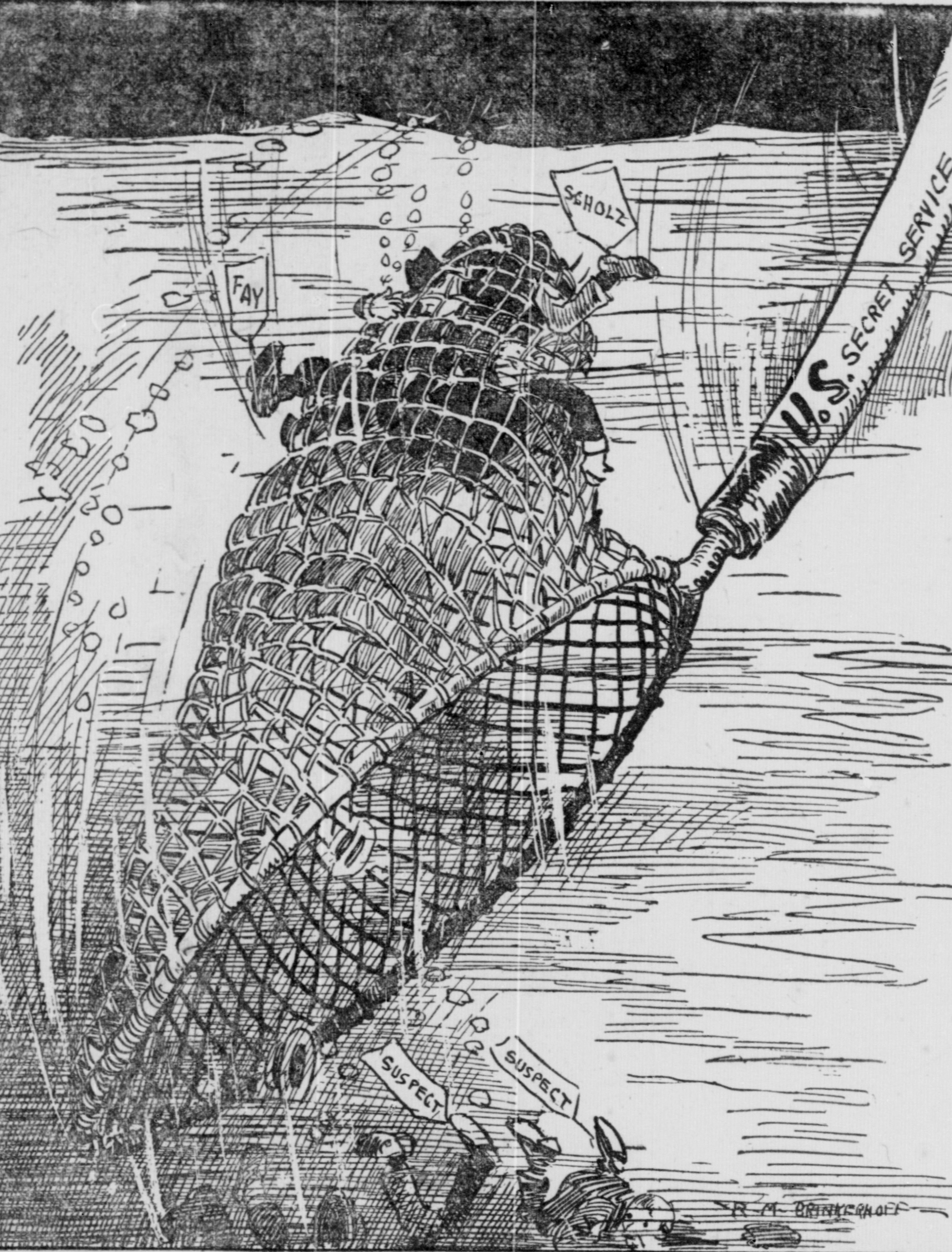
1915 Robert Moore Brinkerhoff cartoon showing the US Secret Service rounding up German spies

In Detroit, Kaltschmidt became the president of the Marine City Salt company. He was also elected secretary of the local Deutcherbund.

== World War I ==
In May 1915, Kaltschmidt called a meeting of fellow pro-Germans including Walter Scholz, Charles F. Respa, and his brother-in-law Carl Schmidt. He told those assembled that it was their duty to the fatherland to sabotage the production of munitions that were being sent to Allied nations fighting the Central Powers. On June 21, 1915, Kaltschmidt provided Respa with 156 sticks of dynamite and introduced him to a night watchman, William Lefler, who was employed as security at the Peabody Overall Co. factory in Walkerville, Ontario, Canada.

On June 21, 1915, Respa was able to bomb the Peabody factory, but a bomb placed at the Windsor Armoury failed to explode, saving the lives of 200 soldiers who were stationed there. On March 7, 1916, Respa was sentenced to life imprisonment. In 1917, sabotage group leader Kaltschmidt faced charges in the US for attempting to bomb the Detroit Screw Works. Others charged were William M. Jarosh, Richard Herman, and Fritz A. Neef, general manager of the Eismann Magneto company.

=== Sentencing ===
Detroit Judge Arthur J. Tuttle sentenced Kaltschmidt to four years in United States Penitentiary Leavenworth, and a $20,000 fine ($502,600 in 2025). His co-conspirators were also sentenced:

- Fritz Neef, to two years in Leavenworth and a $10,000 fine,
- Ida Kaltschmidt Neef, to three years in the Detroit House of Correction and a $15,000 fine,
- Carl Schmidt, two years in Leavenworth and a $10,000 fine, and
- Mary Schmidt, two years in the Detroit House of Correction and a $10,000 fine,
- while Frank Franz Respa was acquitted.

== Aftermath ==
Kaltschmidt was released from prison in February 1921, after which he was deported. In 1927, he was allowed to return for two months for business purposes. At the end of his two months, however, Kaltschmidt failed to report to federal officials. An article by the Detroit Free Press reported that, "quicker than you could bat an eye, he was arrested by Government agents and booted out of the country."

== See also ==
- Terrorism in the United States
- United States home front during World War I § Sabotage
- List of German-sponsored acts of terrorism during World War I

== Bibliography ==
=== References ===
- "Albert Carl Kaltschmidt Found Guilty of Plots Against United States". Daily Capital Journal. Salem, Oregon. December 22, 1917. p. 1. ISSN 2163-8535. OCLC 42946548 – via Library of Congress.
- "Kaltschmidt and Four Others Tried to Wreck Screw Works, is Charged". The Detroit Times. Detroit, Michigan. May 22, 1917. p. 1. ISSN 2688-9390. OCLC 9977557 – via Library of Congress.
- Dimmel, Brandon R. (October 15, 2016). Engaging the Line: How the Great War Shaped the Canada–US Border. University of British Columbia Press. ISBN 9780774832779.
- Bowker, R. R. (1916). Information: A Digest of Current Events. Vol. II. R. R. Bowker.
- West, Nigel (December 24, 2013). Historical Dictionary of World War I Intelligence. Scarecrow Press. ISBN 9780810880023.
