= Henry John Cambie =

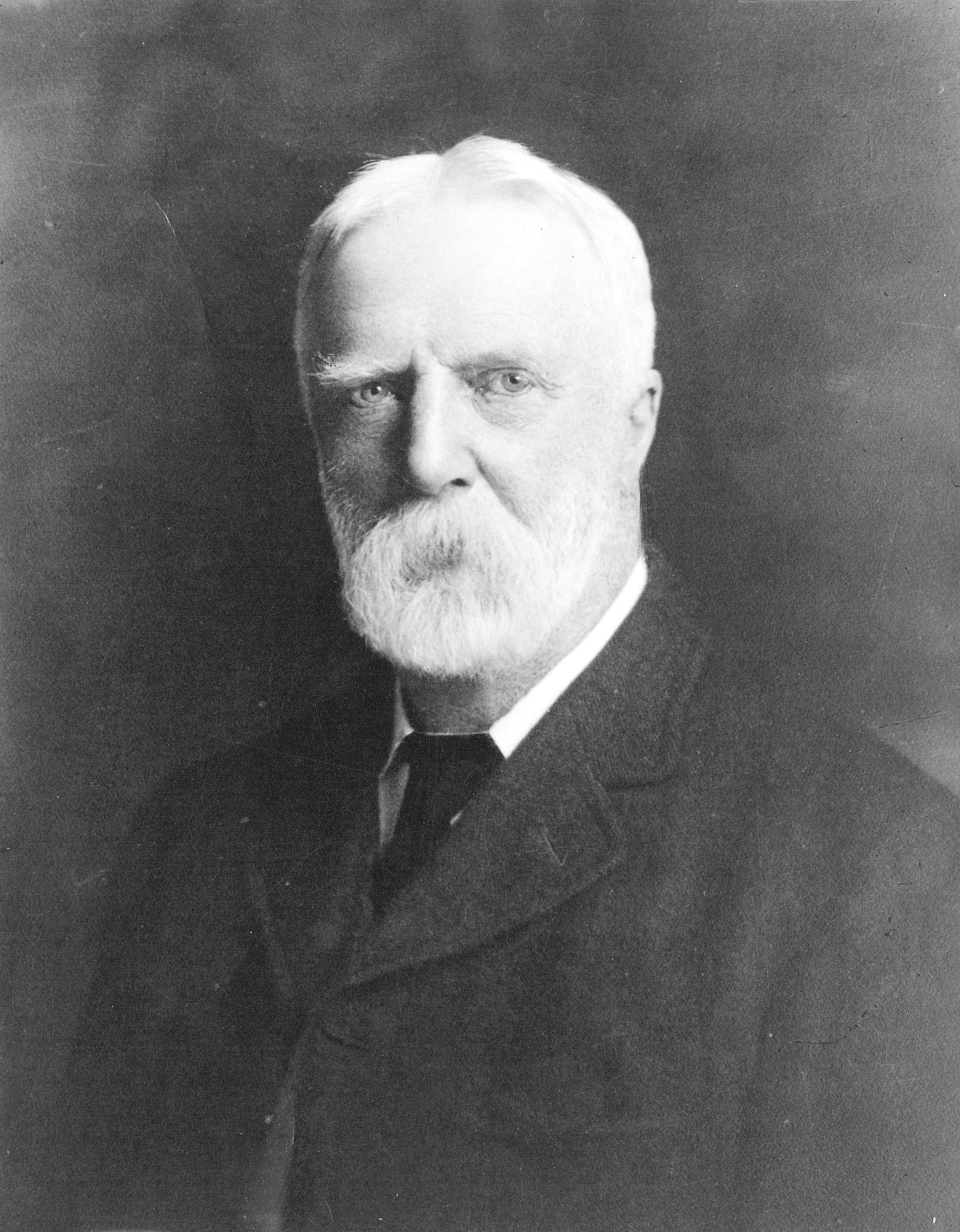
- Henry John Cambie
- Born: October 25, 1836; County Tipperary, Ireland
- Died: April 23, 1928 (aged 91); Vancouver, British Columbia, Canada
- Occupations: Surveyor, Civil Engineer, Pioneer

Henry John Cambie (October 25, 1836 – April 23, 1928) was a Canadian surveyor and civil engineer and a notable figure in the completion of Canada's transcontinental railway. He was also a notable pioneer resident of Vancouver.

== Life and career ==
Cambie was educated in England and emigrated to the Province of Canada as a youth, where he learned to be a surveyor. In 1852, he found employment with the Grand Trunk Railway, moving to the Canadian Pacific Railway (CPR) seven years later. With the Confederation of Canada in 1867, the CPR was contracted to build a transcontinental railway, which would link the new country and the adjacent colonies and territories of British North America. With the expansion of the railway into British Columbia, Cambie found himself as the chief surveyor for the CPR in the province. In that capacity, Cambie argued for a route through the Fraser Canyon and terminating at the small logging community of Granville on Burrard Inlet. He was convinced of the superiority of that route over the alternatives of Howe Sound and Bute Inlet after a trip down the canyon to Granville in 1874.

Cambie's views prevailed, and in 1876, he was made chief surveyor of the CPR's Pacific Division, a position he would hold for the next four years, following which he was promoted to chief engineer. His work completed, Cambie in 1887 settled in Vancouver, which had been incorporated as the successor to Granville the previous year. As he recalled in a later interview:

In May 1887, much to the amusement of my friends, I went out into the country and purchased two lots at the corner of Georgia and Thurlow streets. I could not, however, induce the city to clear a track so I could reach my property until near the end of that year, when I at once started building and moved out there in 1888. I had to lay the first sidewalk on Georgia at my own expense, as the city would not do it, and when I got the telephone the company dunned me for more than a year to pay for the poles from Granville Street down to my place, as they told me that no one else in that generation would ever go to live west of Granville Street.

The area of which Cambie spoke is now located near the centre of downtown Vancouver, in one of the most densely populated neighbourhoods in the country and the site of Cambie's home is now the location of Vancouver's tallest building, the Living Shangri-La.

Cambie was a prominent citizen of the nascent city and was an important advocate for the development of its infrastructure. He was also instrumental in building Christ Church Cathedral, the major Anglican church in Downtown Vancouver, where he was a key figure for over forty years (a memorial plaque commemorating him can be found inside the church). In this and other developments, Cambie's connections with the CPR — and especially, its president, William Van Horne — were crucial to his success, since the company owned much of the land around Vancouver. Cambie remained employed by the CPR, only retiring in 1921.

== Death ==
Cambie died in Vancouver in 1928 at the age of 91.

== Name legacy ==
=== Roadway infrastructure ===
- Cambie Street - a major thoroughfare in Vancouver,
  - the Cambie Street Bridge
- Cambie Road, a major east–west thoroughfare in Richmond, British Columbia.

=== Neighbourhoods ===
- South Cambie, a neighbourhood in Vancouver
  - Cambie Village, a neighbourhood shopping district
- West Cambie, a residential neighbourhood in Richmond
- East Cambie, a residential and industrial neighbourhood in Richmond

=== Train stations ===
- Northeast of Sicamous, British Columbia (CPR).
- Southwest of Glacier, British Columbia (CPR) (closed 1916).
- North Richmond on British Columbia Electric Railway (closed 1958).
- Proposed name for Aberdeen station (TransLink), in Richmond, but not adopted.

=== Other ===
- Henry James Cambie Secondary School in Richmond.
