= Voxel Bridge =

Public artwork

Coordinates: 49.2668°N 123.1149°W

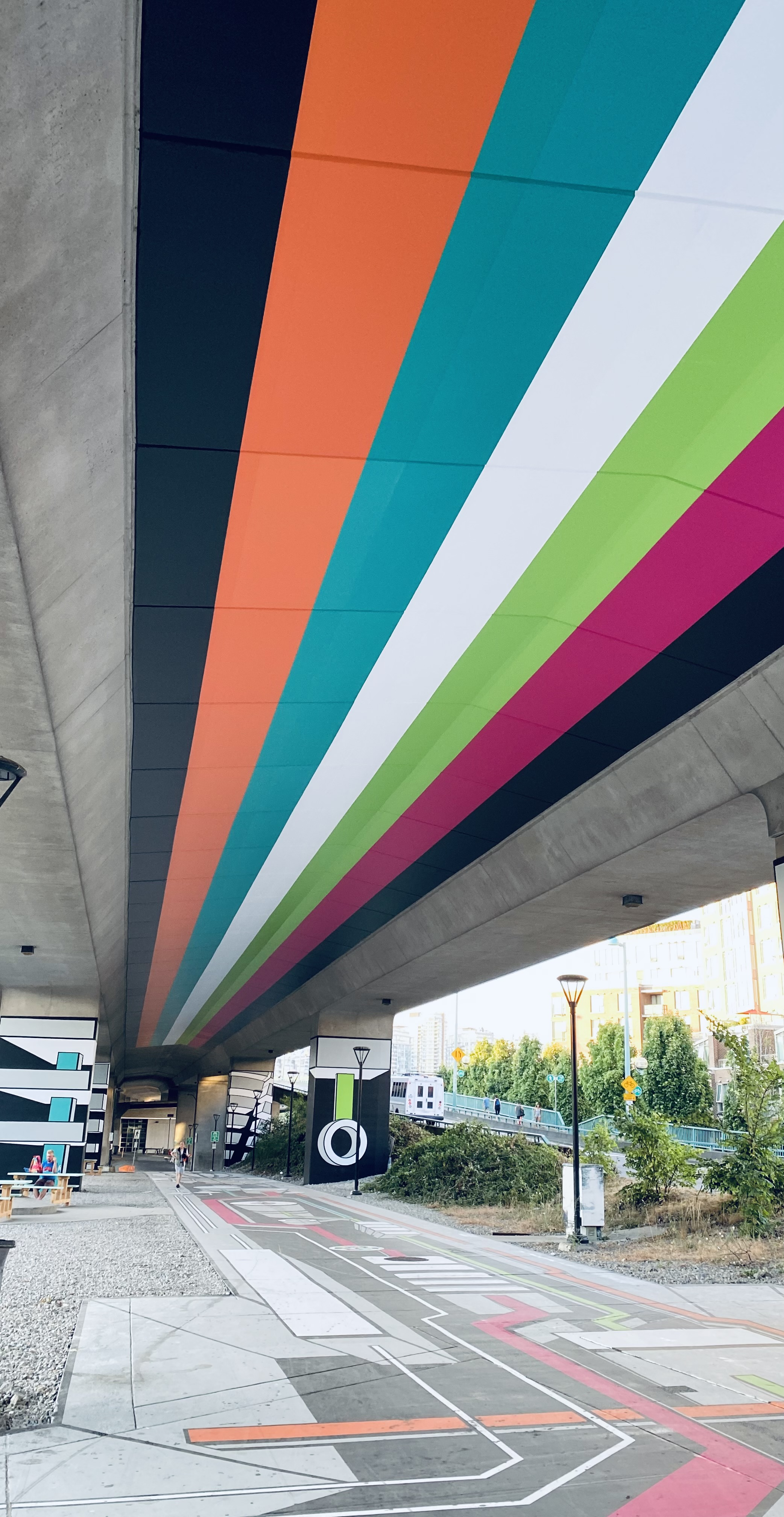
A section of the mural

Voxel Bridge was an interactive public artwork under the Cambie Bridge in Vancouver, by artist Jessica Angel. The 8,000-square-foot (740 m^{2}) mural was a vinyl overlay on the bridge that revealed interactive elements through augmented reality (AR), with aspects of the artwork being sold as non-fungible tokens. The installation was part of the Vancouver Biennale from summer 2021 to 2023.

== Description ==
The Voxel Bridge project was part of the Vancouver Biennale. The object was located on the lower tier of the Cambie Bridge, the first wooden version of which was built in 1891. The word “voxel” means a point in a three-dimensional space. Voxel Bridge existed both as a tangible analogue work of art and an online digital one. The author of the public art installation was Colombian artist Jessica Angel. She created this installation at the suggestion of Barrie Mowatt, the artistic director and Founder of the Vancouver Biennale.

The art installation covered an area of about 8,000 square feet (740 m^{2}). The organizers of the Biennale announce that Voxel Bridge would become the largest installation in the field of digital public art. According to the COO, "nothing [had] been done at this scale outdoors that's fully interactive".

The installation of the vinyl cover began on June 7, 2021. The development of the entire project took about three years and more than $300,000, far exceeding the planned budget. Therefore, the animations presented are supposed to be sold to recover the costs. The opening of the art object was scheduled at noon on August 12, 2021, and was supported until 2023.

The project featured 20 different interactive animations, which also displayed the history of the Kusama network and how it was created, funded, and governed. Each of animation corresponded to its own NFT - a non-fungible token in a blockchain technology system.

The Vancouver Biennale app, through which users could interact with augmented reality was available for free download on Mac and Android devices. Jessica Angel worked on the online element in partnership with the Spheroid Universe, which powers blockchain technology on the Kusama Network.

== Meaning ==
The organizers of the forum call the Voxel Bridge project "a milestone event in Contemporary Art", explaining:

This is not simply a mural or a piece of crypto art. Voxel Bridge exists simultaneously in three worlds: in the real world under Vancouver’s Cambie Bridge, in Augmented Reality as experienced through the app, and in live blockchain. As an integrated fusion of the real and digital worlds, it delivers a groundbreaking audience experience using the latest advancements in Augmented Reality technology.

== See also ==
- Public art in Vancouver

== External sources ==
- Voxel Bridge on Vancouver Biennale official page
