= MacNeill Secondary School =

A. R. MacNeill Secondary School

Location
- 6611 No. 4 Rd; Richmond, British Columbia, V6Y 2T2; Canada; 49.16448°N 123.11587°W

Information
- School type: Public, high school
- Motto: P.O.W.E.R. (Positive Attitude, Ownership, We Not Me, Excellence, Respect)
- Founded: September 2, 2003
- School board: School District 38 Richmond
- Superintendent: Scott Robinson
- Area trustee: Richard Lee
- School number: 3838064
- Principal: John Blair
- Grades: 8–12
- Enrollment: 1134 (2025)
- Language: English
- Colours: Blue and Gold
- Mascot: Raven
- Team name: MacNeill Ravens
- Website: macneill.sd38.bc.ca

A. R. MacNeill Secondary School is a secondary school in Richmond, British Columbia, Canada. As of September 2025, there are approximately 1134 students attending the school. It is in School District 38 Richmond. The school was built at a cost of over CAD 25 million. The feeder elementary schools are Anderson, Cook, Talmey and Tomsett.

The school is named after Allan Roy MacNeill, a lifelong educator who became the principal of Richmond High School in 1928, a role he would hold for 31 years.

In addition to being one of the youngest schools in the district, it is also known to pilot and test any new ideas before they are applied to the rest of the schools in Richmond. Due to this specialized program, Macneill has been ranked as one of the most efficient schools in all of Greater Vancouver.

== History ==
A.R MacNeill opened on September 2, 2003. In its first year, it was home to about 200 students and staff. The school also began with only two grade levels, 7 and 8, and as each year passed it added another grade. The first senior class graduated in 2008.

=== 2006–2007 ===
In the 2006/2007 school year, students entering grade 10 were removed from their respective academies and put into what was called the Transition Academy. This new academy was created to emphasize and educate students about graduation requirements, such as the recent Graduation Portfolio and post-secondary and career options.

=== 2008–2009 ===
In the 2008/2009 school year, MacNeill stopped accepting grade 7 students due to low enrollment and completely discontinued the arts and science academy options. MacNeill began using an electronic attendance system called BCeSIS and a new schedule management software.

== Timetable ==
Students at MacNeill take eight courses over the period of two days (Day 1 & Day 2). Each "day" consists of four 65-75-minute periods, a 15-minute break, 20-minute advisory (homeroom), and lunch. Wednesdays and Thursdays, there is Personalised Learning Time (PLT), each course is 65-minutes long, and advisory is omitted. Students' timetables on all days of the week start at 8:30 a.m. and end at 3:00 p.m.

== Athletics ==
A.R. MacNeill competes in the RSSAA leagues and enters teams in all of the traditional fall, winter and spring sport seasons. The following sports are available:

=== Fall ===
- Girls' Volleyball
- Boys' Volleyball (Junior & Senior)
- Boys' Soccer (Senior)
- Cross Country
- Swimming

=== Winter ===
- Girls' Basketball
- Boys' Basketball
- Table Tennis
- Curling

=== Spring ===
- Boys' Volleyball (Grade 8 & 9)
- Girls' Soccer
- Badminton
- Golf
- Tennis
- Track & Field
- Ultimate

== Clubs ==
The school has a variety of clubs, covering a vast number of subjects from arts to humanitarianism.

=== Active clubs (2023/24) ===
Club	Description
A.R. MacNeill Programming and Media Club	
BC Youth Council	Students advocate for youth wellness, mental health and community engagement.
Board Games and Chess Club	Students learn, share, and play tabletop games.
Business Club	
Buzz Art Club	Students participate in studio sessions and annual Art-A-Thon to raise money for charity.
Cancer Kids First Vancouver	
Choir Club	
Christian Club	
Coding Club	
Dance Team	
Dungeons and Dragons	
Empower Her	Students fundraise to support marginalized women in BC.
Filming and Performing Club	
First Responders	Team of students with first aid training who respond to emergencies in the school.
Grad Committee	This club plays an important role in planning various graduation events.
Green Team	Students aim to help the Earth by promoting sustainable lifestyles.
Health Science Club	
Inspire 2 Uplift	Promotes friendship and inclusion of disabled students through a buddy program.
Junior Science Club	
Knitting/Crochet Club	
MacNeill STEM Synergy	
MacNeill United Against Hunger	
MacNeill Workshop Club	
Mental Health Club	Students fundraise to support marginalized women in Richmond.
Mind Over Matter	Students raise awareness of mental health issues and challenge stigmas.
Model United Nations	
Muslim Student Association	
Rainbow Club	Supports and empowers LGBTQ+ students and allies.
Raven Outdoor Club	Students join field trips once a month.
Raven Reception	Multi-lingual students help accommodate new and ELL students.
Raven Relieves	Provides students with volunteer opportunities in their community.
Raven Reelz Review	Students meet to discuss and review movies.
Rough Sketch	Students learn the fundamentals of worldbuilding.
Senior Book Club	Grade 11–12 students meet monthly to discuss a chosen book.
Strings Club	Strings players connect and rehearse in a variety of musical styles.
Student Council	Student Council is a student leadership group that promotes school spirit and community activism. The council plays an important role representing the entire student body and plans many events throughout the school year.
Study Club	Provides a place for students to gather and study together.
Universal Raven	For short term exchange students to meet with local students.
Wharton Global Youth Competition	Allows students to participate in the Wharton Global Youth Competition.

=== Inactive clubs ===
The following clubs are not active as of the 2023/24 school year:

Club	Description
30 Hour Famine	Raises funds and awareness to fight world poverty.
Amica Club	Multicultural/friendship club promoting diversity with school and encouraging tolerance and anti-racism.
Animal Rescue Club	Participates in fundraising initiatives with the goal of helping to support animals in care.
Anime Club	
Band	
Chess Club	
Drama Production	Students acting or helping behind the scene to produce the annual spring drama production.
DVD Club	This club takes photos and videos throughout the year and edits their footage to make the school's yearly DVD.
Gardening Club	Tends to the school garden.
Global Footprints	
Japanese Culture Club	
Jazz Band	
Library Monitors	Shelving books, keeping it organized & taking care of the library.
Raven Readers	This club meets on a monthly basis to discuss different books.
Raven Review	Writes and produces seasonal magazines containing school news & athletics, reviews and entertainment.
Ski and Snowboard Club	
Student Interpreters Club	Students who act as interpreters
Unity Club	Helps students with special needs feel connected and a part of the school.

== See also ==
- Richmond, BC
- School District 38 Richmond
- Public School
