= BCeSIS =

School-administration software

BCeSIS (the British Columbia Enterprise Student Information System) is the implementation of a common student information system that was used by independent schools and school districts of British Columbia, Canada. eSIS is commercial software developed by The Administrative Assistants Ltd of Ontario, Canada, that provides a foundation for a centrally hosted, web accessible student information system. BCeSIS was replaced by MyEducationBC (MyEdBC) in 2015. MyEdBC is software developed by Follet.

== Background ==
The BCeSIS System is currently hosted by Fujitsu Canada under contract to the British Columbia Ministry of Education. Currently all districts have signed a memorandum of understanding to voluntarily adopt BCeSIS on their own timeline. Support for schools and districts adopting the new system is provided by their own local staff resources in conjunction with Fujitsu Service Desk and the Ministry of Education. The Independent Schools of BC have pooled their resources as a consortium (the iGroup) and implementation/training and support of BCeSIS for Independent and First Nations School is handled by this consortium.

== Criticism ==
=== Social Criticism ===
Some teachers dislike the system, believing it to be a tool of social control, centralizing potentially sensitive private information, and placing important decisions about student education in the hands of unelected committees with no background in education.

=== Poor user interface ===
The system also draws criticism for its archaic user interface. Some screens within the program allow arrow key movement, some functions use icons or multi-level text clicks, others require mouse clicks. The general design was not field tested on its intended users, nor was it tested on multiple browsers, and resulted in a poor user experience. For example, fields containing parent phone numbers only display the part of the number; a mouse click and arrow clicks are required to see the rest. Students lists (a typical class consists of 24–30 students) shows only thirteen names on the screen; one has to scroll down for the rest. Marks entry encounters similar design faults: sideways scrolling within student field-sets are required to access the three types of data typically entered (per cent, work habits, comment selection). Combined with a start-up beset with server problems the introduction of BCeSIS was met with sharp anxiety and a call to examine whether the system was worth the $80 million expenditure.

BCeSIS requires the use of outdated Java versions, as support for newer versions of Java was never implemented. There are many known serious security issues with the outdated version of Java required to run BCeSIS

Using the Teacher Assistant interface, the teacher has access to the student demographics and contact information as well as details regarding the students' performance, programs and special education needs. BCeSIS gathers attendance in the classroom using an electronic attendance checklist and allows both the teacher and the office to share information regarding student absences. In an upcoming release of BCeSIS the province will be implementing a new capability called Parent Assistant that will allow parents to monitor their children's attendance and performance as it is entered into the system.

== Media attention ==
BCeSIS drew media attention in September 2010 for slow performance that hampered the efforts of schools to make timetable changes, process student transfers, and complete attendance. With new school district using the service, Fujitsu Service Desk was forced to limit the number of logins and post "BCeSIS unavailable" messages during peak usage hours. This compounded the performance issues and resulted in a number of internet parodies, including a re-subtitled scene from the movie Downfall.

On September 19, 2011, The Vancouver Sun reported that the Ministry of Education would be discontinuing use of the BCeSIS software, based on a recommendation by Gartner, Inc, and would likely not have a replacement in place until 2014. The Minister of Education, George Abbott, said that the system had glitches but was still good value for money, and was being replaced largely because the technology was outdated.

== Future ==
BCeSIS has been replaced by MyEducationBC.
