= Cambie Bridge =

Cambie Street Bridge
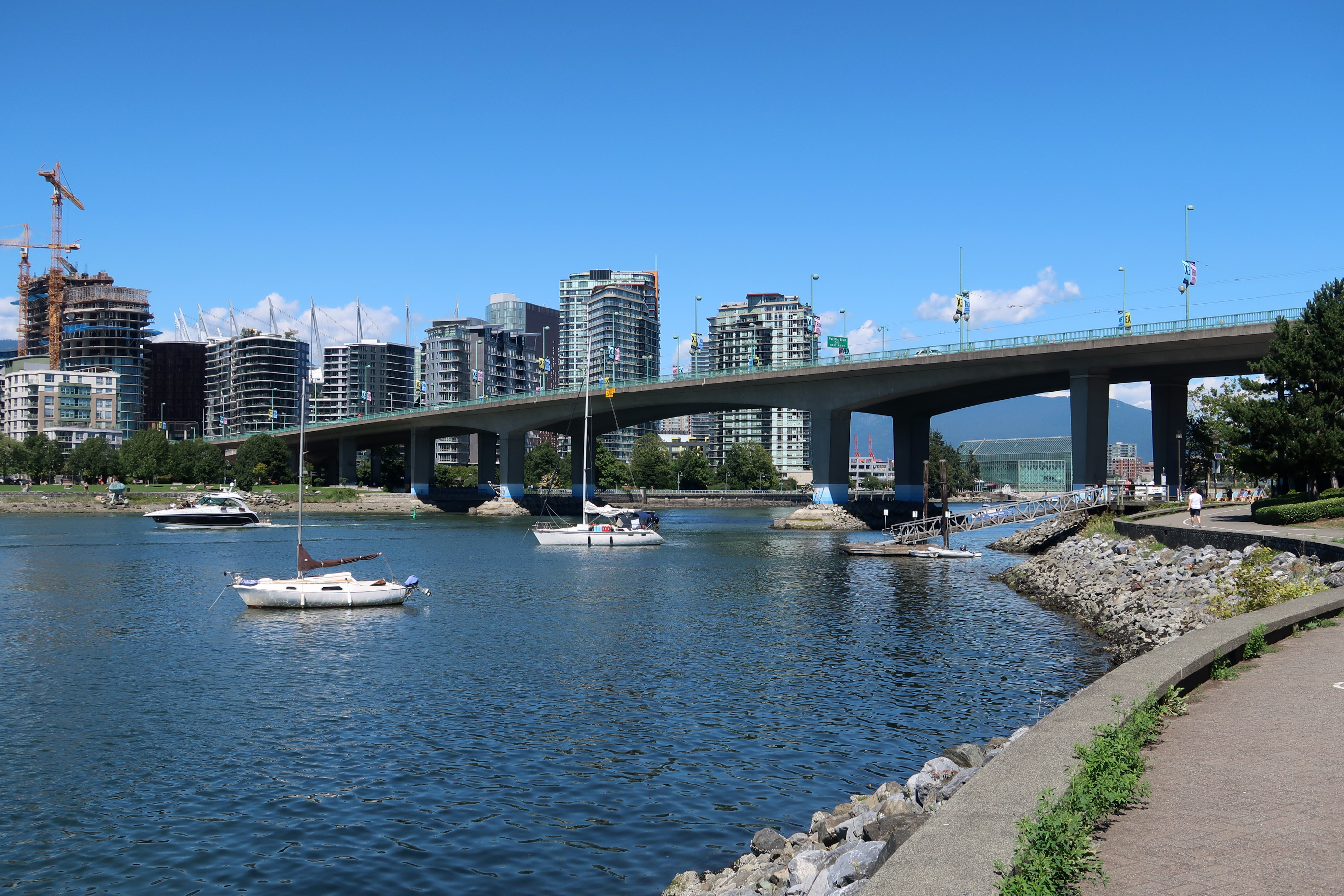
- Cambie Street Bridge from the south side of False Creek.
- Coordinates: 49.272005°N 123.114896°W
- Carries: Five lanes of Cambie Street, pedestrians and bicycles
- Crosses: False Creek
- Locale: Vancouver
- Maintained by: City of Vancouver

Characteristics
- Design: girder bridge
- Total length: 1,100 m (3,600 ft)

History
- Opened: December 8, 1985 (replaced 1911 and 1891 bridges)

Location
- Interactive map of Cambie Street Bridge

The Cambie Bridge is a six-lane, precast, box girder bridge spanning False Creek in Vancouver, British Columbia. The current bridge opened in 1985, but is the third bridge at the same location. Often referred to as the Cambie Street Bridge, it connects Cambie Street on the south shore of False Creek to both Nelson and Smithe Streets in the downtown peninsula. It is the easternmost of False Creek's fixed crossings; the Burrard and Granville bridges are a little more than a kilometre to the west, and the new Canada Line SkyTrain tunnel is built just west of the Cambie Bridge.

== History ==
The first Cambie Street Bridge, opened in 1891, was built as a simple piled-timber trestle with a trussed timber swing span near the middle. It cost $12,000 (CAD).

=== Second bridge ===
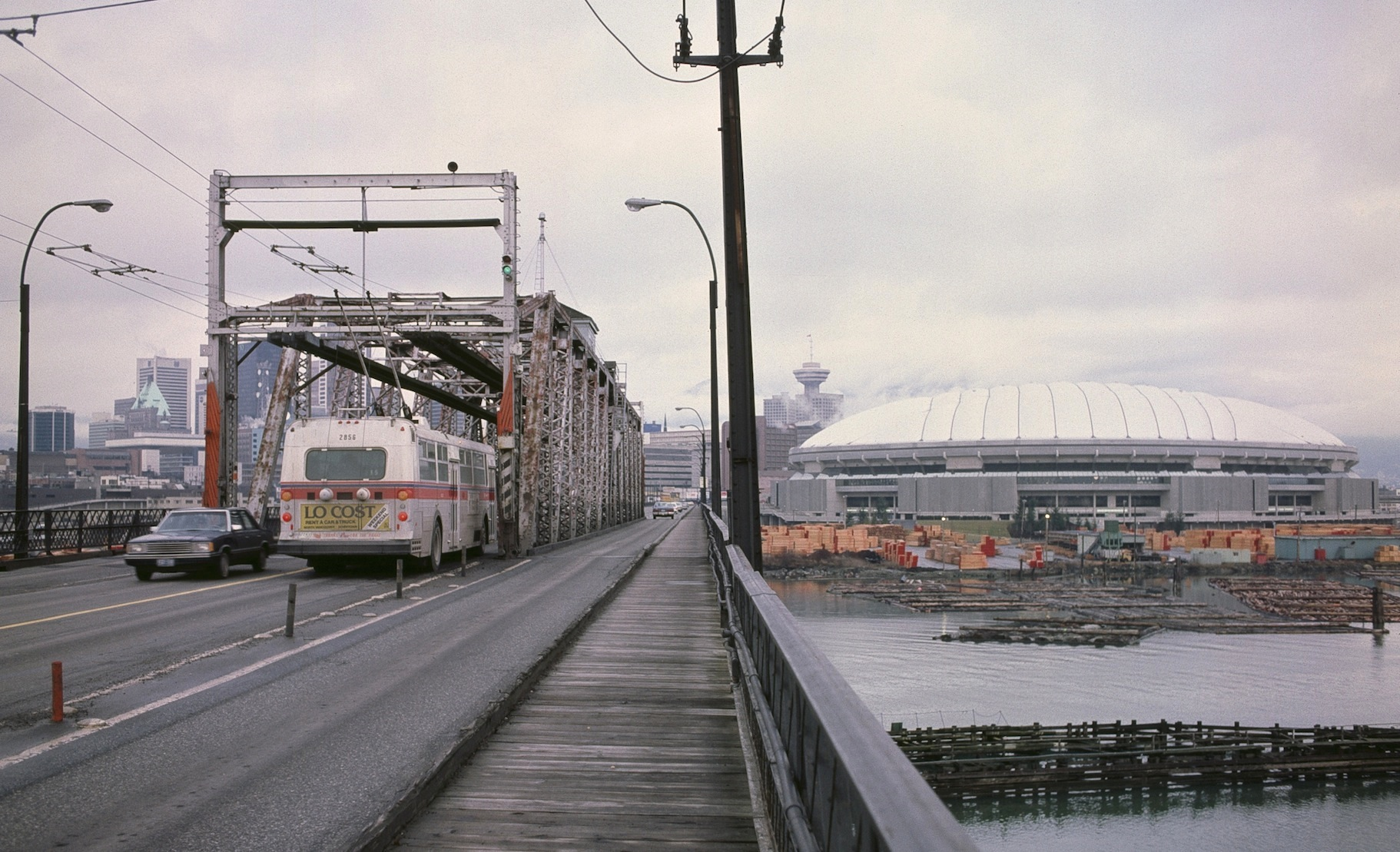
The second Cambie Street Bridge, or "Connaught Bridge", less than a year before its closure.

The next bridge was a four-lane, medium level steel bridge, 1,247 metres (4,091 ft) long and carrying streetcar tracks. It was completed in 1911 for $740,000, opening to traffic on May 24, 1911. The following year, Canada's Governor General, the Prince Arthur, Duke of Connaught and Strathearn, accompanied by the Duchess and their daughter, Princess Patricia, visited Vancouver to officiate at a ceremony renaming the new crossing as the "Connaught Bridge" on September 20, 1912. The name "Connaught" never caught on, and most people continued to call it simply the "Cambie Street Bridge", after the street that runs across it, Cambie Street, named for pioneer Vancouver resident Henry John Cambie. During World War I, on April 29, 1915, a fire broke out on the bridge that was thought to be an arson attack. Four Germans were arrested.

The navigation span was a steel through-truss swing span which the city would open on four hours' notice. In 1953, it opened 79 times. Even in its later years, it was opened once or twice a week. The trusses of the swing span projected through the bridge deck, dividing the two outer lanes from the two inner lanes. This contributed to many motor vehicle collisions. In April 1915, the creosoted wood deck caught fire, with the collapse of a 24.4-metre (80 ft) steel side span.

==== Early images, including 1915 fire damage ====
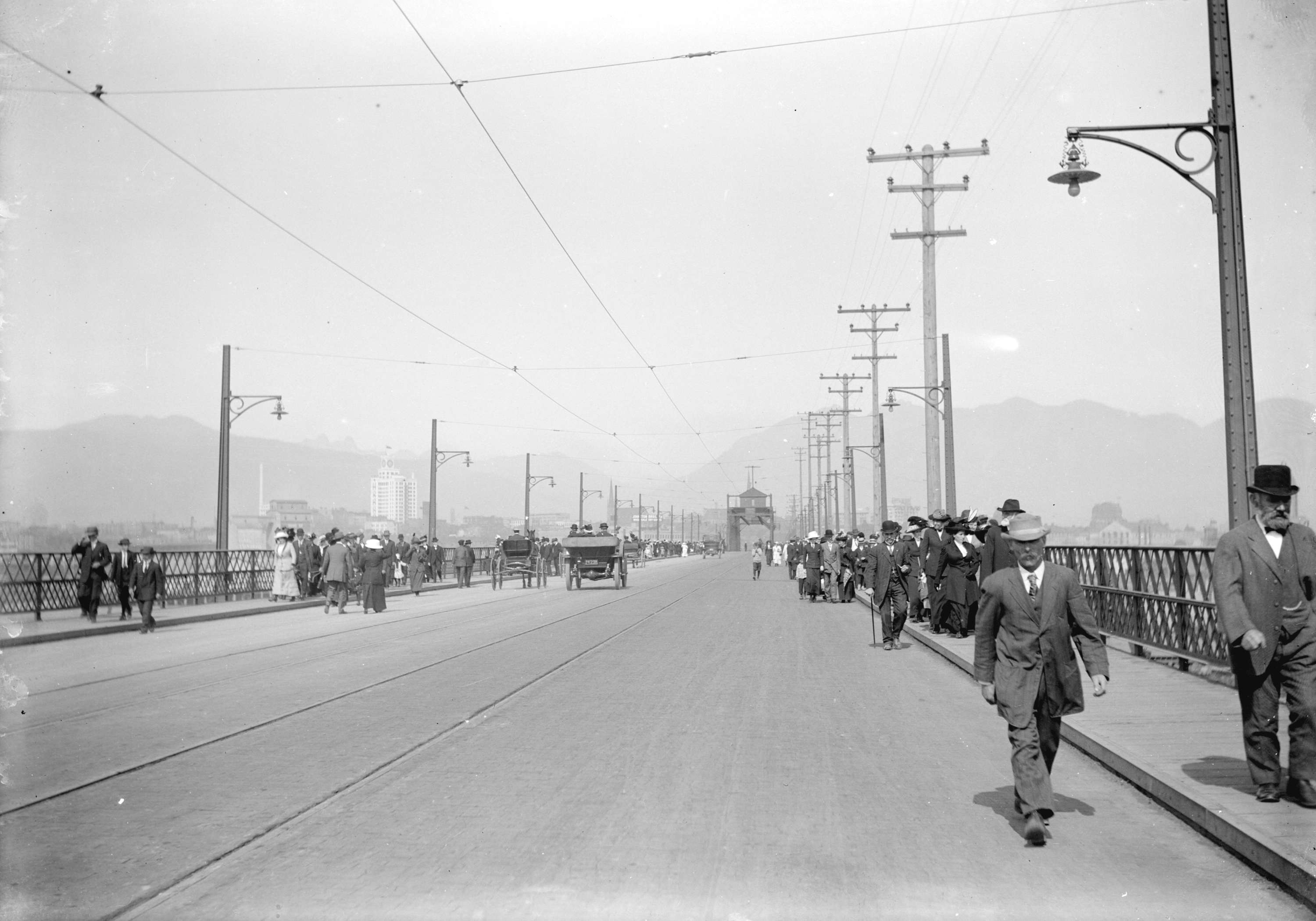
The 1911 bridge about year after its opening

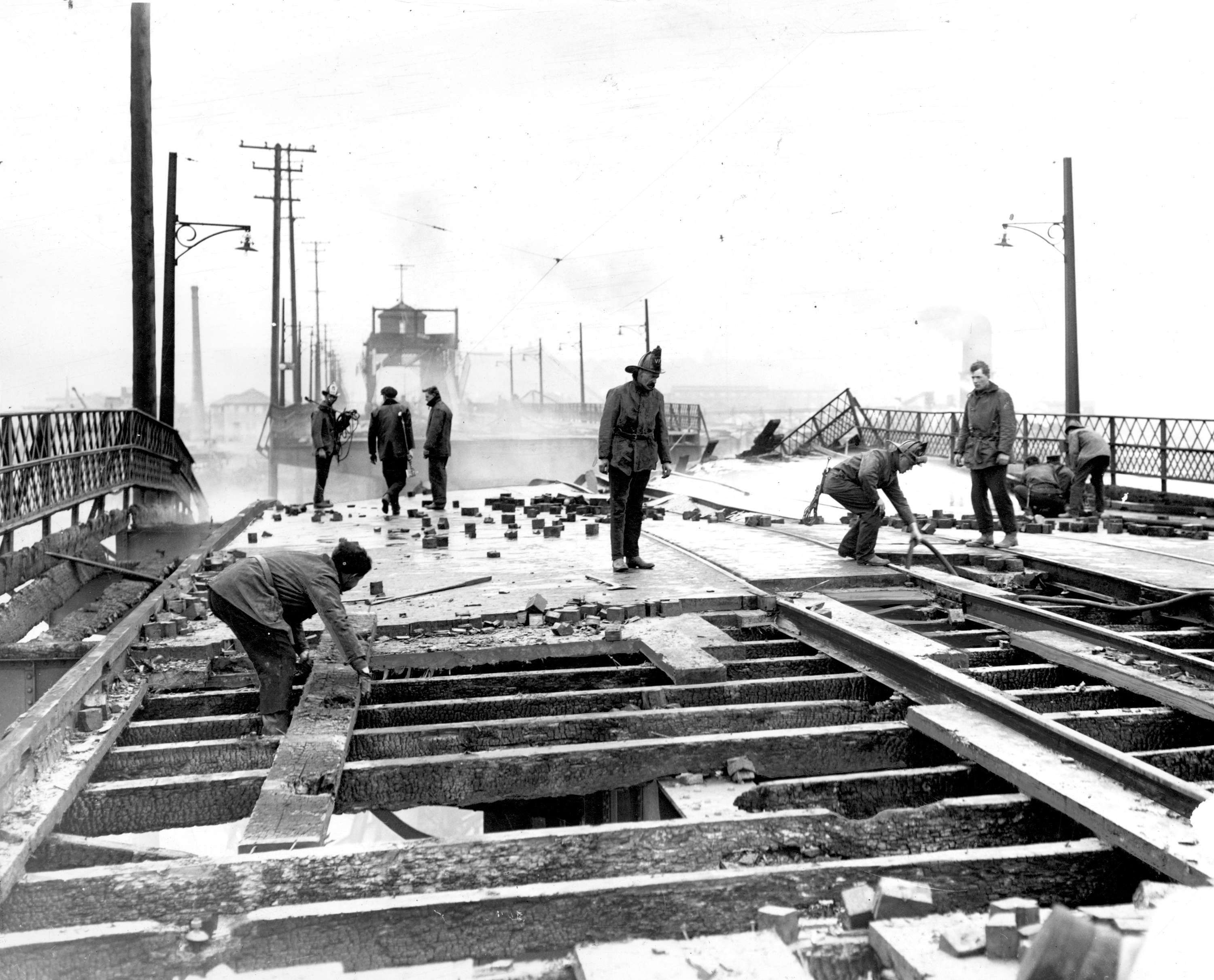
Workers on the bridge after the fire

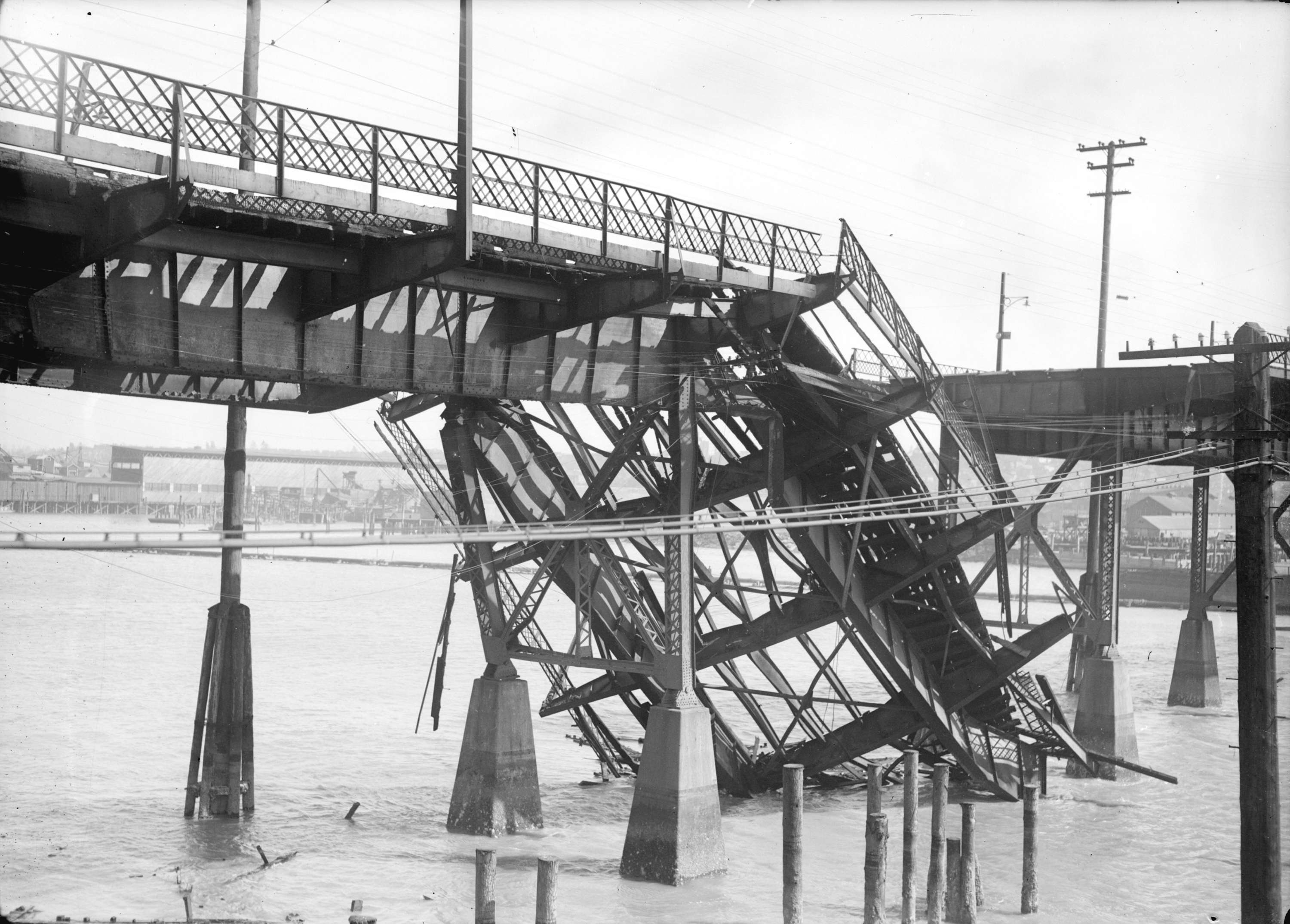
The fire caused a section of the bridge to collapse into False Creek.

=== The present bridge ===
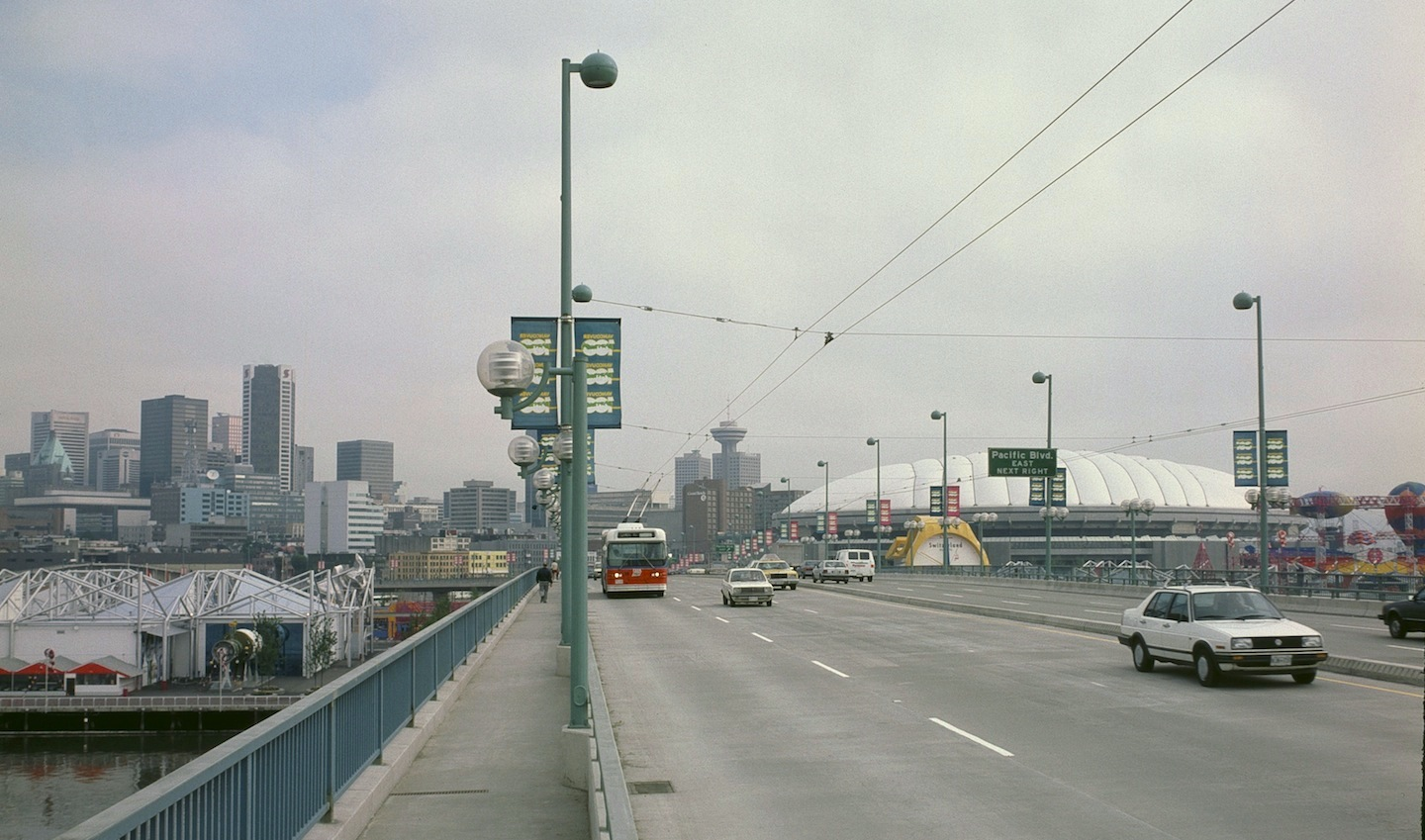
A street-level view of the bridge in 1986

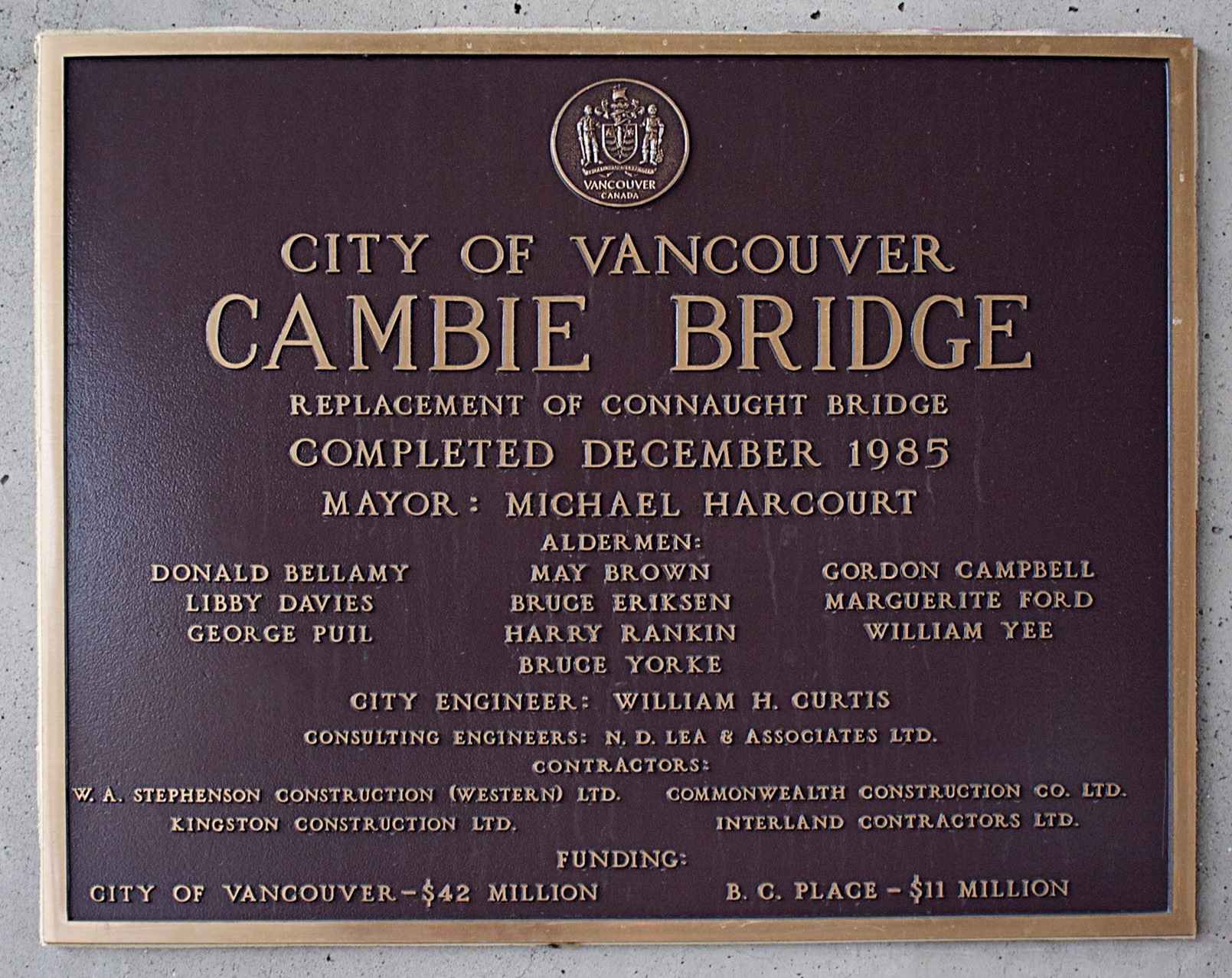
Plaque at the south end of the bridge

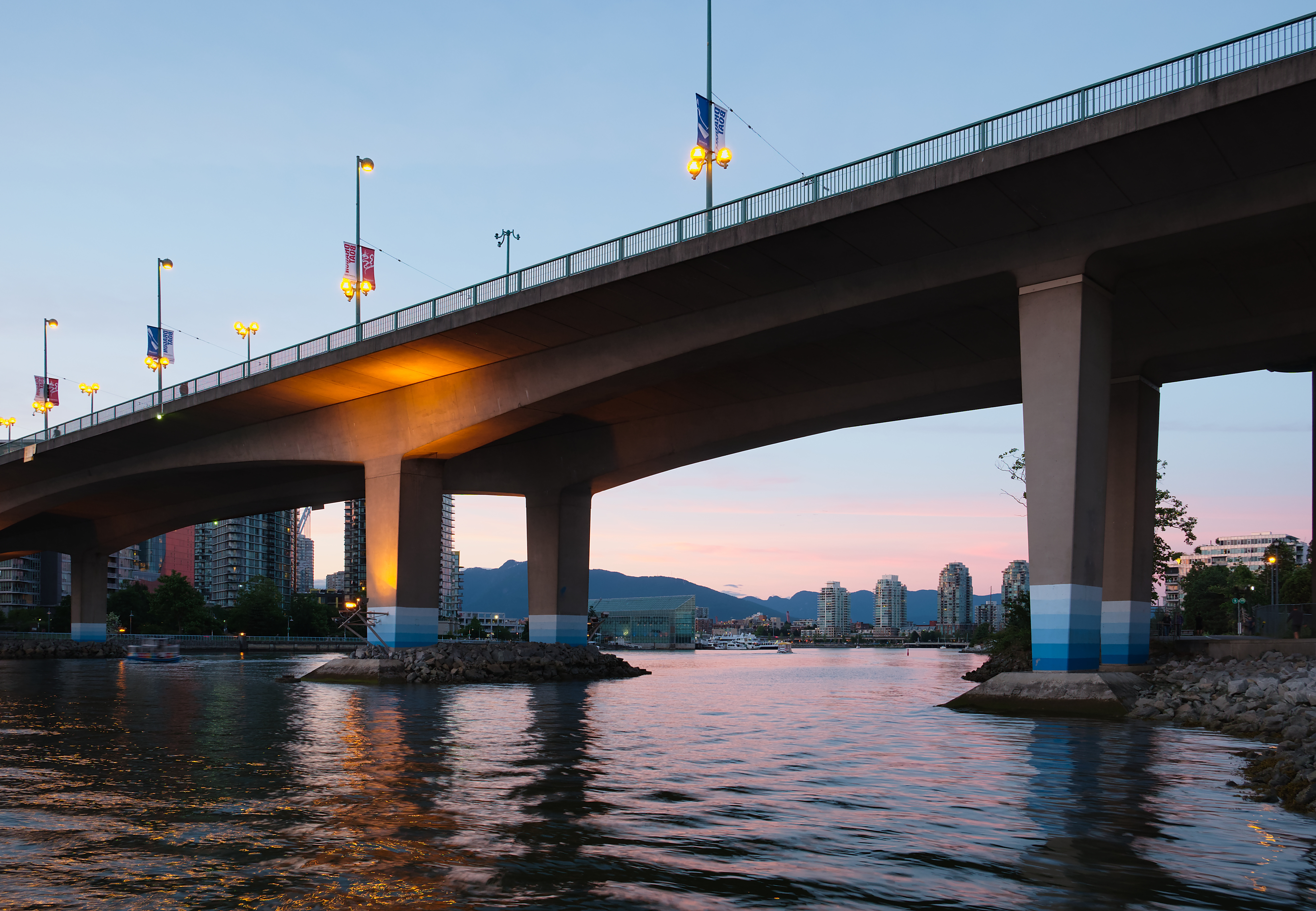
Cambie Street bridge viewed from the Spyglass Dock

A new, higher, non-opening bridge was built in 1983–1985 to replace the 1911 structure. The entire Cambie crossing was closed for nine months, starting November 1984, while the present, six-lane, concrete bridge was merged with the existing approaches. The new bridge cost $52.7 million and was opened on December 8, 1985, after being built to a tight timescale so as to be available for Expo 86 in May 1986. City engineer W.H. Curtis was assisted by E.A. West, Assistant City Engineer, Streets & Structures, who was closely involved in its construction.

The 1985 bridge is of a twin post-tensioned prestressed concrete type in a continuous span. The total structural length is 1,100 metres (3,600 ft); it carries 6 lanes of traffic and a 14-foot (4.3 m) pedestrian walkway. The colouring of the concrete was obtained through the addition of volcanic ash from Mount Lassen to the mix.

Under the bridge's south end is the Neighbourhood Energy Utility, a city-owned heat transfer station that provides heating and hot water to all new buildings in Southeast False Creek.

Both sides of the bridge include pedestrian sidewalks separated from motor vehicle traffic by concrete barriers. The Cambie Bridge ranks second of the three False Creek bridges by measure of pedestrian crossings. A 2002 study measured over 1,500 pedestrians crossing the Cambie Bridge in 11 hours on a weekday. The wider east sidewalk is shared with bicycles. Bicycles are also permitted on the bridge roadway in both directions.

The Cambie Bridge is often used as part of the running route for events such as the Vancouver Sun Run, the BMO Vancouver Marathon, and the CIBC Run for the Cure.

Two TransLink bus routes cross the Cambie Bridge: 17 and N15. On January 17, 2018, the City of Vancouver announced plans to remove a car lane using it as a bike lane. It noted that the volume of motor vehicles using the bridge has decreased on the last 20 years with at least 80,000 bike trips daily on the bridge. The bike lane was officially constructed on June 2, 2018 and opened on June 25, 2018.

In the summer of 2021, an interactive augmented reality mural called Voxel Bridge was installed under Cambie Bridge as part of the Vancouver Biennale. It was removed in August 2023.

== See also ==
- Cambie Street
- List of bridges in Canada
