= Cambie Seymour Hostel =

Hostel in British Columbia, Canada

Coordinates: 49.2840°N 123.1143°W

The Cambie Seymour Hostel is a heritage hostel, located in the heart of downtown Vancouver, British Columbia. It is also home to Malone's Bar and Grill, a sports pub. Notable attractions in its neighborhood are Vancouver Mysteries, Marine Building, and Bill Reid Gallery.

== History ==
Where the Cambie Seymour Hostel and Malone's stands today, was home to the Clarence Hotel, one of Vancouver's oldest original pubs and hotels. The heritage building has been renovated to retain its old style hotel charm, by adding the arched windows.
