= Cambie Street =

Street in Vancouver, Canada

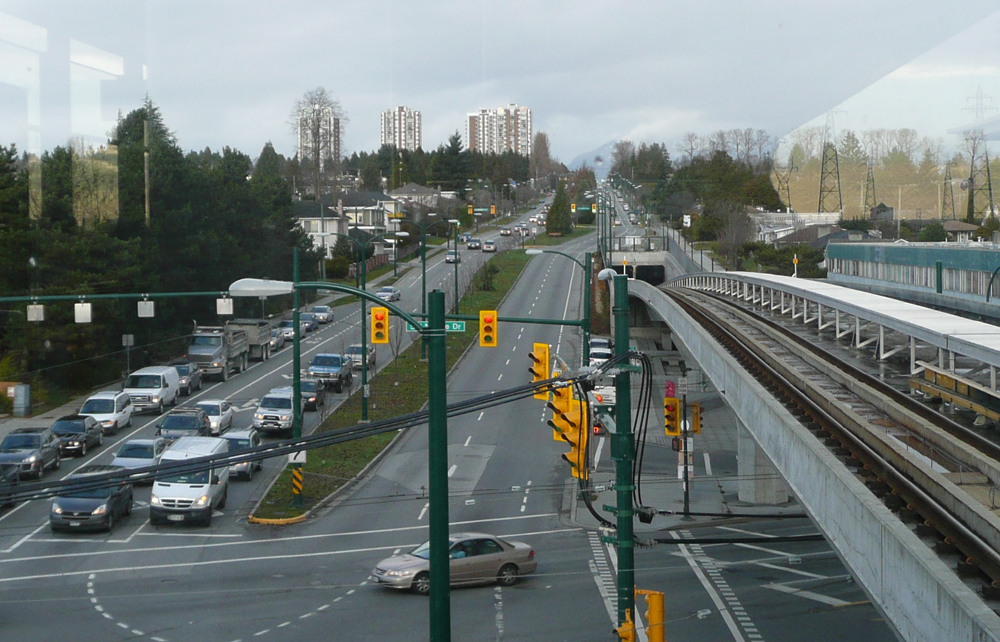
- The intersection of Cambie Street and Southwest Marine Drive, looking northward from the Marine Drive Canada Line station.
- Namesake: Henry John Cambie
- Type: Street
- Owner: City of Vancouver
- Maintained by: City of Vancouver
- Location: Vancouver, British Columbia
- Nearest metro station: Canada Line

Other
- Known for: Cambie Village, Queen Elizabeth Park Oakridge Mall
- Main Section
- Length: 7.7 km (4.8 mi)
- South end: Kent Avenue N
- Major junctions: SW Marine Drive; 41st Avenue; Broadway
- North end: Smithe Street / Nelson Street
- Downtown Section
- Length: 1.4 km (0.87 mi)
- Southwest end: Pacific Boulevard
- Major junctions: Nelson Street; Smithe Street; Georgia Street; Hastings Street
- Northeast end: Water Street

Cambie Street is a street in Vancouver, British Columbia, Canada. It is named for Henry John Cambie, chief surveyor of the Canadian Pacific Railway's western division (as is Cambie Road, a major thoroughfare in nearby Richmond).

There are two distinct sections of the street. North of False Creek, the street runs on a northeast–southwest alignment (following the rotated street grid within Downtown Vancouver). As such, the street direction is approximately 45 degrees to that of the Cambie Bridge, and there is no seamless connection between the two. Instead, Nelson Street carries southbound traffic onto the bridge, and Smithe Street carries northbound traffic away from the bridge. The downtown section of Cambie Street runs from Water Street in Gastown in the north to Pacific Boulevard in Yaletown in the south and is a two-way street for its length.

South of False Creek, the street is a major six-lane arterial road, and runs as a two-way north–south thoroughfare according to the street grid for the rest of Vancouver. This section of the street was originally named Bridge Street, and was first connected to Cambie Street after the first Cambie Bridge opened in 1891; it was renamed Cambie Street after the second Cambie Bridge opened in 1912.

Between King Edward Avenue West and Southwest Marine Drive, the street has a 10 metre wide boulevard with grass and many well established trees on it; the boulevard was designated as a heritage landscape by the city of Vancouver in 1993.

== Canada Line construction ==
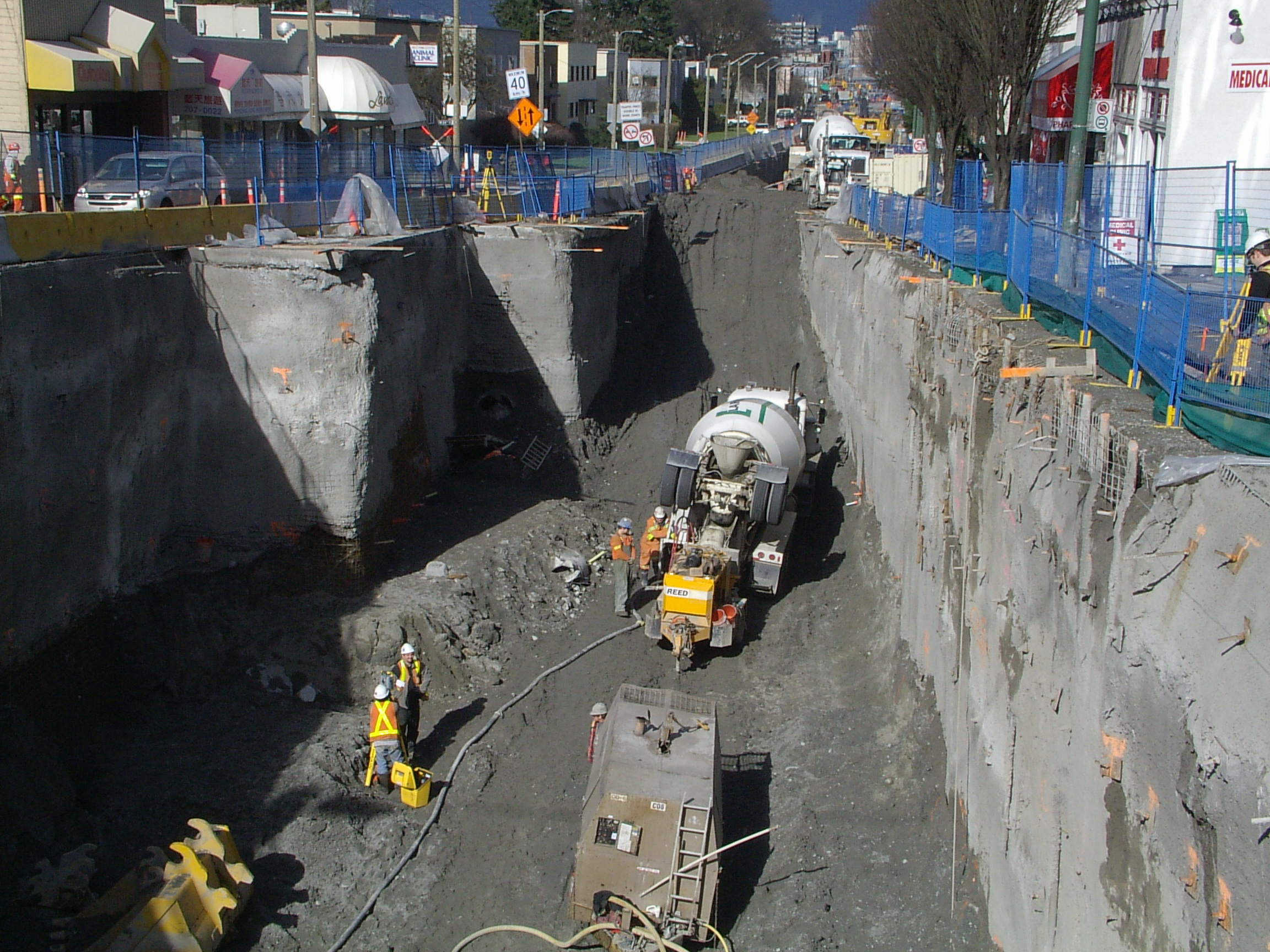
Cut-and-cover construction on Cambie Street, north of 25th Avenue (taken in February 2007).

When proposals to build SkyTrain's Canada Line (formerly known as the Richmond-Airport-Vancouver or RAV Line) along Cambie Street first emerged, they were heavily protested by residents and business owners who wanted to keep the street as a heritage boulevard. They argued in favour of using the existing Arbutus Street rail corridor instead.

Once the decision was made to use the Cambie alignment for the Canada Line anyway, residents along the corridor successfully persuaded authorities to put the rail line in a tunnel instead of running it as a surface route, and to dig the tunnel using a tunnel boring machine. However, due to cost concerns and time constraints, the winning bidder decided to use a cut-and-cover method to build the tunnel – which required disruption to traffic and business along the corridor during the construction. As such, even though it cost less and was much faster than using a tunnel boring machine, the plan drew heavy criticism from area residents and businesses.

During 2006 to 2009, portions of the street south of False Creek were closed to traffic to allow for construction of the line. The cut-and-cover tunnel runs underneath the east side of the street for most of its route. South of West 63rd Avenue, the line emerges from the tunnel and runs on an elevated structure across the Fraser River.

Gregor Robertson, who later became the mayor of Vancouver, was a strong supporter of Cambie Street merchants and spoke regularly about hardships from the Canada Line construction. He called the handling of the rail line construction an "injustice."

On March 23, 2009, Robertson testified in a lawsuit brought by Cambie Street merchant Susan Heyes, owner of Hazel & Co., in the B.C. Supreme Court regarding damage to her business from the construction, a lawsuit for which she was awarded $600,000 by the B.C. Supreme Court due in part to the fact that there was insufficient action to mitigate the effects of Canada Line construction on Cambie Street merchants. The award for damages was later reversed at the British Columbia Court of Appeal, which determined that while the project had resulted in a legal nuisance to the claimant, the government had acted within its authority and was therefore not liable for damages. Leave for further appeal to the Supreme Court of Canada was subsequently denied. On the Canada Line's opening day of August 17, 2009, Robertson said Greater Vancouver needed more rapid transit but the Canada Line was a "great start" and that he was a "Johnny-come-lately" to the project.

== Points of interest ==
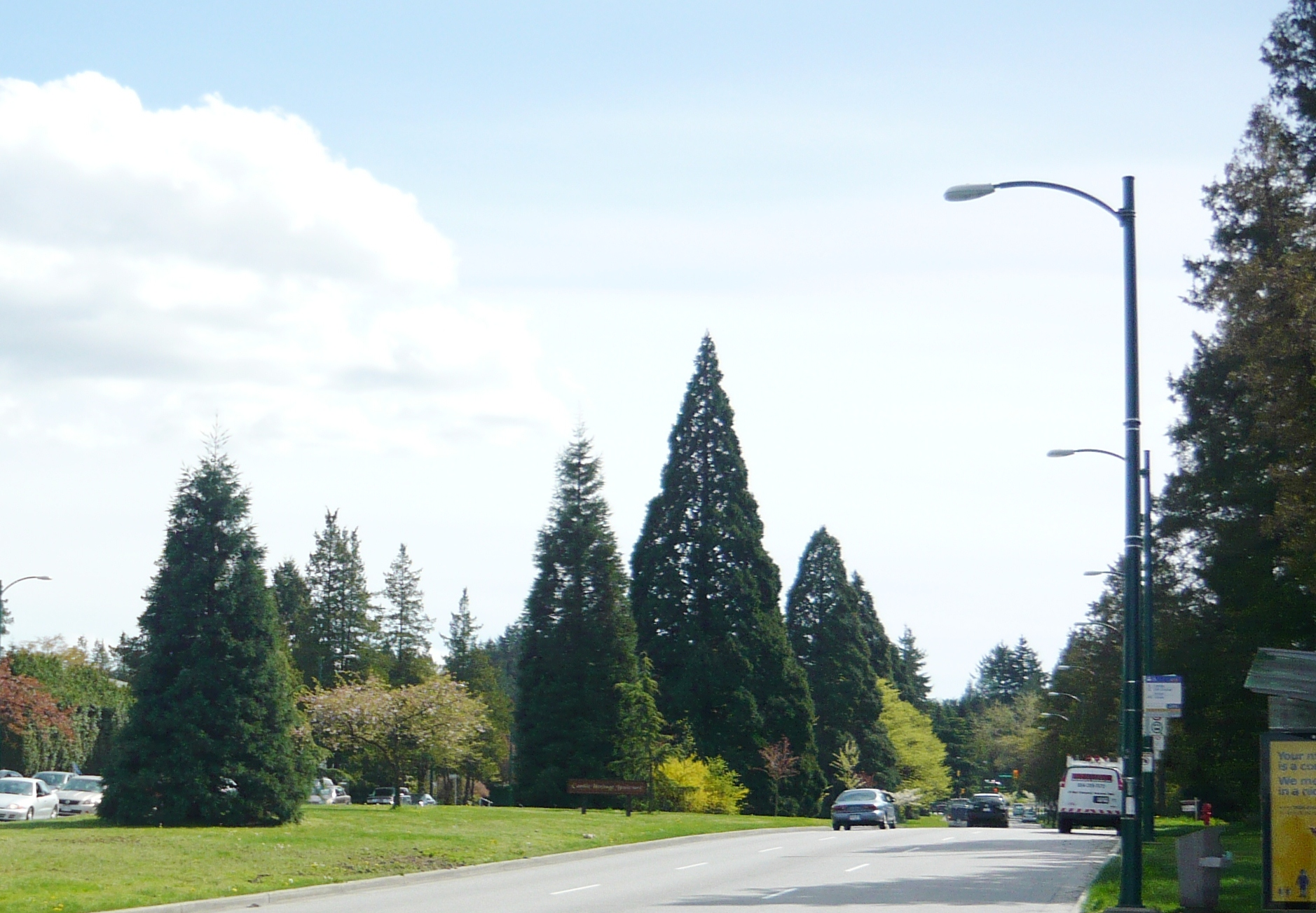
Cambie Heritage Boulevard, looking southward from King Edward Avenue.

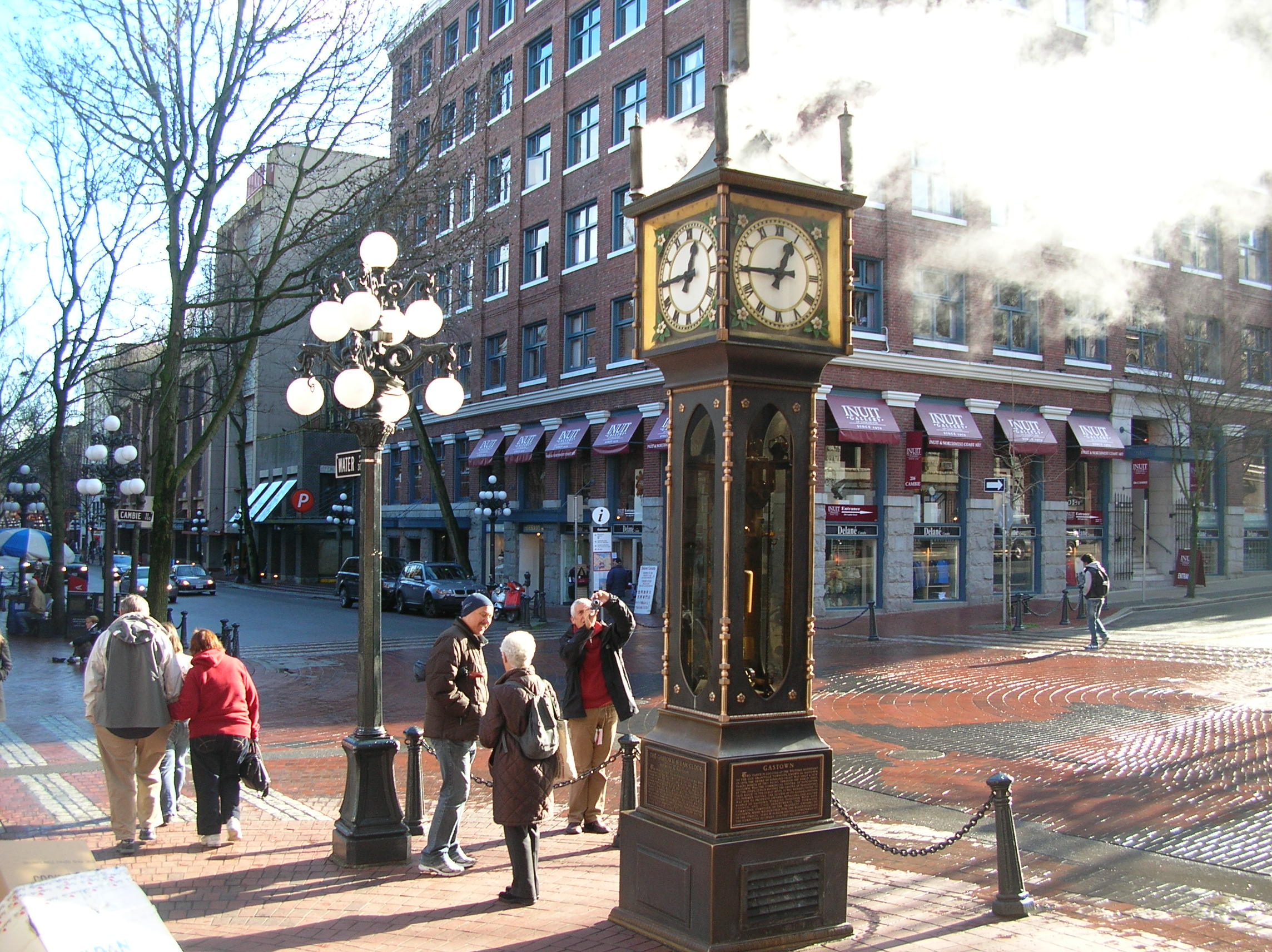
Steam clock at Cambie Street's northern end in Gastown.

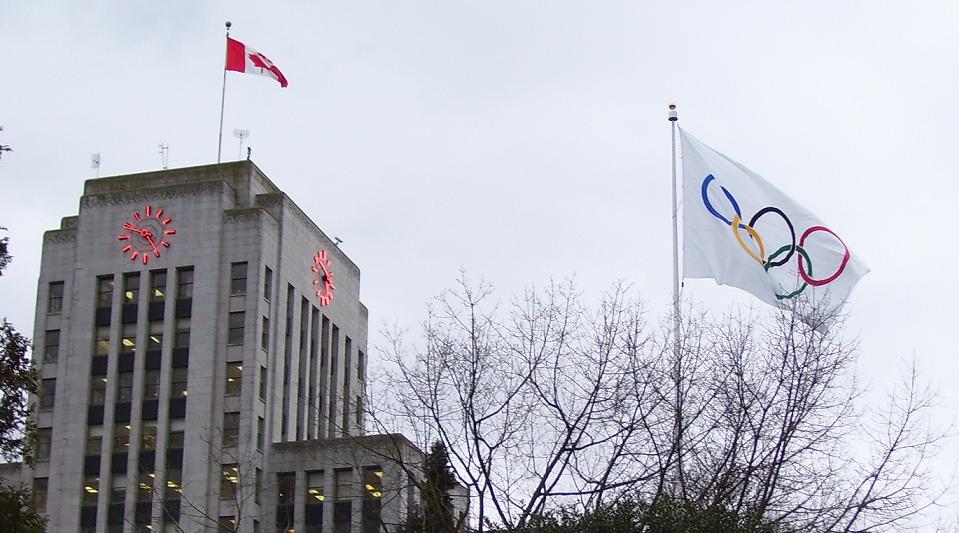
Vancouver City Hall

- The Gastown steam clock, located at the street's northern end, at its intersection with Water Street
- Victory Square and cenotaph, located on the west side of the street between Hastings and Pender streets
- The downtown campus of Vancouver Community College, located at the intersection with Pender Street
- The Vancouver City Hall, located on the street between 10th Avenue and 12th Avenue
- The Park Theatre, at 18th Avenue, in "Cambie Village"
- Queen Elizabeth Park, located east of the street between 29th Avenue and 37th Avenue
- Oakridge Park, shopping centre at 41st Avenue
- Langara College, a community college at 49th Avenue
- St. John Ambulance, Provincial Headquarters for one of BC's oldest charities

== Major intersections ==
=== Main section ===
The entire route is in Vancouver.

km	mi	Destinations	Notes
0.0	0.0	Kent Avenue N	
0.5	0.31	Southwest Marine Drive	Marine Drive station
1.4	0.87	West 57th Avenue	
2.2	1.4	West 49th Avenue	Langara–49th Avenue station
3.1	1.9	West 41st Avenue	Oakridge–41st Avenue station; near Oakridge Centre
4.0	2.5	West 33rd Avenue	Access to Queen Elizabeth Park
4.9	3.0	King Edward Avenue	King Edward station
6.2	3.9	West 12th Avenue	Near Vancouver City Hall
6.5	4.0	West Broadway (Highway 7) – Burnaby, Maple Ridge	Broadway–City Hall station
6.9	4.3	West 6th Avenue, West 2nd Avenue	Grade separated; near Olympic Village station
6.9– 7.7	4.3– 4.8	Cambie Street Bridge over False Creek	
7.7– 7.9	4.8– 4.9	Pacific Boulevard	Northbound exit only; near BC Place
7.7– 7.9	4.8– 4.9	One-way transition – northbound follows Smithe Street, southbound follows Nelson Street	
7.7– 7.9	4.8– 4.9	Expo Boulevard	Northbound access only (at-grade)
8.1	5.0	Cambie Street	Downtown section
8.5	5.3	Seymour Street (Highway 99 north) – Horseshoe Bay ferry terminal, Whistler	One-way, northeast-bound
8.6	5.3	Granville Street	Granville Mall, transit only
8.7	5.4	Howe Street (Highway 99 south) – Vancouver International Airport, Tsawwassen ferry terminal, Canada–United States border	One-way, southwest bound
8.9	5.5	Burrard Street	Smithe Street becomes Haro Street; Nelson Street continues northwest
1.000 mi = 1.609 km; 1.000 km = 0.621 mi: HOV only; Incomplete access; Route transition

=== Downtown section ===
The entire route is in Vancouver.

km	mi	Destinations	Notes
0.0	0.0	Pacific Boulevard	
0.2	0.12	Nelson Street	One-way, southeast bound; provides access to the Cambie Bridge and Cambie Street main section
0.4	0.25	Smithe Street	One-way, northwest bound; provides access from the Cambie Bridge and Cambie Street main section
0.6	0.37	Robson Street	
0.7	0.43	West Georgia Street to Highway 99 north – Horseshoe Bay ferry terminal, Whistler	Former Highway 1A east / Highway 99A south
0.9	0.56	Dunsmuir Street	Former Highway 1A west / Highway 99A north; one-way, northwest bound
1.2	0.75	West Hastings Street	Former Highway 7A; near Victory Square
1.3	0.81	Cordova Street	One-way, eastbound
1.4	0.87	Water Street	One-way, westbound; near Gastown steam clock
1.000 mi = 1.609 km; 1.000 km = 0.621 mi

== See also ==
- Cambie Street Grounds (Larwill Park)
- Cambie Seymour Hostel
