= West Cambie, Richmond =

West Cambie
- Neighbourhood
- Location of West Cambie in Richmond

- Location in Metro Vancouver
- Coordinates: 49.184615°N 123.113832°W
- Country: Canada
- Province: British Columbia
- City: Richmond

Area
  - Total: 2.53 km^{2} (0.98 sq mi)

Population (2021)
  - Total: 12,255
  - Density: 4,844/km^{2} (12,550/sq mi)
- Forward sortation area: V6X

West Cambie is a primarily residential neighbourhood located in Richmond, British Columbia. The neighbourhood is bounded by Garden City Road to the west, Sea Island Way and Highway 99 to the north, Shell Road to the east, and Alderbridge Way and Westminster Highway to the south.

The area is divided into three distinct sub-communities, alongside property designated for the Department of National Defence:

- The Oaks: The northernmost section of the neighbourhood, located north of Cambie Road.
- Odlinwood: The area situated east of No. 4 Road and north of Alderbridge Way.
- Alexandra: The area located west of No. 4 Road.

== History ==
The West Cambie area was mostly farmland until 1909, when the Alexandra tract was subdivided from Crown Grant agricultural land into large acreage lots. The growing community featured a blend of early 20th-century housing styles, predominantly craftsman homes and bungalows. Originally designated as Section 34-5-6, this development stands as one of the municipality’s earliest recorded subdivision plans.

Between the 1970s and 1990s, The Oaks sub-community was redeveloped with low-density suburban housing, followed by the slightly higher-density development of Odlinwood in the 1990s.

In 2006, the City of Richmond released the Alexandra Area Plan, which called for the transformation of Alexandra's large lots into a denser community of low-rise apartments and townhomes to address the need for missing middle housing. Today, four- to -six-story apartment buildings line the community's western streets, while townhome complexes occupy the east.

Following a ten-year planning process and negotiations with the city, developer SmartCentres received approval in 2013 to construct a retail complex on the southwest side of the Alexandra community. The outdoor shopping centre, Central at Garden City, opened in 2016, anchored by a Walmart Supercentre, Marshalls, Designer Shoe Warehouse, and Bed Bath & Beyond.

== Demographics ==
The 2021 census found that English was spoken as mother tongue by 37.2% of the population. The next most common mother tongue language was Cantonese, spoken by 29.2% of the population, followed by Mandarin at 16.7%.

Panethnic groups in the West Cambie neighbourhood (2021)
| Panethnic group | 2021 |
| Panethnic group | % |
|---|---|
| East Asian (Note: Statistic includes total responses of "Chinese", "Korean", and "Japanese" under visible minority section on census.) | 72.4% |
| European (Note: Statistic includes all persons that did not make up part of a visible minority or an indigenous identity.) | 6.7% |
| Southeast Asian (Note: Statistic includes total responses of "Filipino" and "Southeast Asian" under visible minority section on census.) | 7.8% |
| South Asian | 5.8% |
| Middle Eastern (Note: Statistic includes total responses of "West Asian" and "Arab" under visible minority section on census.) | 1.5% |
| Latin American | 1.4% |
| African | 1.4% |
| Other/multiracial (Note: Statistic includes total responses of "Visible minority, n.i.e." and "Multiple visible minorities" under visible minority section on census.) | 3.2% |
| Total population | 100% |
Note: Totals greater than 100% due to multiple origin responses

== Transportation ==
The vast majority of West Cambie residents rely on cars for their daily commute, with over 80% traveling either as drivers (75.4%) or passengers (6.6%). Public transit handles a modest 12.9% of work trips, while active commuting remains rare—only 3.1% of the population walks to work, and 0.6% cycle.

=== Public Transport ===
TransLink operates several bus routes through West Cambie, offering residents direct transit connections across Richmond and into neighbouring cities like Vancouver, Burnaby, New Westminster, and Surrey. Local service includes routes 301, 405, 407, 410, 416, and 430.

=== Cycling ===
West Cambie features a grid of designated bike routes that accommodate local commuting:

- East/West Connections: Odlin and Alderbridge.
- North/South Connections: Garden City, Alexandra Greenway, and the Shell Road Trail.

== Education ==
The West Cambie area is home to two elementary schools:

- Tomsett Elementary School
- Talmey Elementary School

While there are no secondary schools directly in the area, the neighbourhood is in the catchment area of A.R. MacNeill Secondary School in the adjacent City Centre area.
