= East Cambie, Richmond =

East Cambie
- Neighbourhood
- Location of East Cambie in Richmond

- Location in Metro Vancouver
- Coordinates: 49.184582°N 123.091538°W
- Country: Canada
- Province: British Columbia
- City: Richmond

Area
  - Total: 4.53 km^{2} (1.75 sq mi)

Population (2021)
  - Total: 10,780
  - Density: 3,988/km^{2} (10,330/sq mi)
- Forward sortation area: V7C, V7E

East Cambie is a neighbourhood located in Richmond, British Columbia. The neighbourhood is bounded by Highway 99 and Shell Road in the west, the Bridgeport Industrial Park in the north, No 6. Road in the east, and Westminster Highway in the south.

The community is anchored by Cambie Plaza at the intersection of Cambie Road and No. 5 Road. This commercial node provides the surrounding residential blocks with grocery options, medical services, financial institutions, and local dining amenities.

The East Cambie neighbourhood is defined by its seamless connectivity to the provincial highway system via Highway 99 and Highway 91, as well as its close proximity to the Vancouver International Airport. Consequently, the surrounding area is dotted with hotels along its western edge, with corporate office parks and industrial warehouses spanning both its east and west ends.

== History ==
The development history of East Cambie has been primarily shaped by its strategic position within regional transportation networks. By 1985, approximately 200 hectares of land within the area had been zoned for industrial purposes.

The subsequent completion of the Annacis Bridge, now known as the Alex Fraser Bridge and the connecting Richmond Freeway significantly enhanced the neighbourhood's regional accessibility. This logistical integration catalyzed a shift in the local land use fabric, stimulating substantial new residential construction alongside expanded commercial and employment services.

The residential housing stock reflects distinct eras of municipal growth, where the initial phases of suburban residential construction in the 1960s and 1980s established many of the area's foundational structures, followed by an intensive era of development between 1990 and 2000 during which approximately 40% of the neighbourhood's current dwellings were constructed.

== Economy ==
PressReader, Boston Pizza and The Keg both maintain their corporate headquarters in the area, while Boeing Canada, Siemens, Corvus Energy, MDA Space, and Broadcom operate major regional offices here.

Additionally, the Richmond Auto Mall is located within the neighbourhood, anchoring a high concentration of vehicle dealerships and generating a robust cluster of local auto repair shops.

== Demographics ==
The 2021 census found that English was spoken as mother tongue by 44.0% of the population. The next most common mother tongue language was Cantonese, spoken by 19.4% of the population, followed by Punjabi at 7.4%.

Panethnic groups in the East Cambie neighbourhood (2021)
Panethnic group	2021
Panethnic group	%
East Asian (Note: Statistic includes total responses of "Chinese", "Korean", and "Japanese" under visible minority section on census.)	40.4%
European (Note: Statistic includes all persons that did not make up part of a visible minority or an indigenous identity.)	11.4%
Southeast Asian (Note: Statistic includes total responses of "Filipino" and "Southeast Asian" under visible minority section on census.)	17.1%
South Asian	22.7%
Middle Eastern (Note: Statistic includes total responses of "West Asian" and "Arab" under visible minority section on census.)	3.1%
Latin American	0.9%
African	1%
Other/multiracial (Note: Statistic includes total responses of "Visible minority, n.i.e." and "Multiple visible minorities" under visible minority section on census.)	3.4%
Total population	100%
Note: Totals greater than 100% due to multiple origin responses

== Transportation ==
East Cambie has one of the least reliance on vehicular travel in comparison to neighbouring suburban areas with 70.6% of residents driving to work and 11% commuting as passengers. Public transit serves 12.8% of the population, while active options remain modest, with 3.4% walking and 0.6% cycling to their jobs.

=== Public Transport ===
Translink serves bus routes through East Cambie, providing the neighbourhood with direct connections to destinations within Richmond and to neighbouring cities like New Westminster, Burnaby, and Vancouver. These bus routes include the 405, 407, 410, 430, and the 416.

== Education ==
The East Cambie area is home to two elementary schools:

- Mitchell Elementary School
- Kathleen McNeely Elementary School

As well as one secondary school:

- Henry James Cambie Secondary School

In addition, the Richmond Adult Education Centre and the private Chaoyin Bilingual School operates in the neighbourhood.

== Parks and Recreation ==
East Cambie is anchored by the expansive King George/Cambie Community Park providing the area with several athletic fields, courts, and a spray park. The park is also home to the Cambie Community Centre, providing community programming to youth, adults, and seniors.

The Richmond Nature Park is located within East Cambie, providing forested trails and nature-focused programming.

In addition to joint-use school grounds, East Cambie is lined with smaller neighbourhood parks, including Albert Airey Park and the Bath Slough Trail.
