= Henry James Cambie Secondary School =

Henry James Cambie Secondary
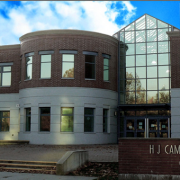

Location
- 4151 Jacombs Rd; Richmond, British Columbia, V6V 1N7; Canada; 49.1834°N 123.08155°W

Information
- School type: Public, high school
- Founded: 1928
- School board: School District 38 Richmond
- Superintendent: Scott Robinson
- Area trustee: Norm Goldstein
- School number: 3838058
- Principal: Marcy Timmins
- Staff: 63
- Grades: 8–12
- Enrollment: 550 (2020/2021)
- Colours: Black and White
- Mascot: Coyotes
- Team name: Cambie Coyotes
- Website: hjcambie.sd38.bc.ca

Henry James Cambie Secondary School is a public high school in Richmond, British Columbia, part of School District 38 Richmond.

== History ==
The school's facility was constructed in 1927 at the corner of Cambie and Sexsmith Roads. It accommodated grades 10 and 11 as Richmond Secondary School until 1937, when grades 8 and 9 were added, and the school’s name changed to Richmond Junior-Senior Secondary School. With the opening of a new Richmond High School on Foster Road (now Minoru Boulevard) in 1952, the original facility on Cambie Road became Cambie Junior Secondary School, serving Grades 7 to 10.

According to the city of Richmond, "The school was named after the road, but the road was named after Henry James [John] Cambie, an engineer with the Canadian Pacific Railway, who surveyed and built roads in both Vancouver and Richmond."

In 1969, money was appropriated to expand the school, including addition of a chemistry lab.

During the Royal Family's visit to Vancouver in 1971, the band from Cambie Junior Secondary school played God Save the Queen while the Union Jack was hoisted.

In 1995, the original building was replaced by a new facility at Jacombs and No. 5 Road. Renamed Henry James Cambie Secondary School, it became a junior-senior secondary school in 1996. The building on Cambie and Sexsmith roads burned down in the late 1990s.

== Curriculum ==
A 2020 study listed these curricular areas: "Applied Design, Skills & Technology, Arts Education, Career Education, Language Arts – Literacy, Language Arts – Oral Language, Language Arts – Reading, Language Arts – Writing, Mathematics / Numeracy, Physical & Health Education, Science, Social Studies".

One 2020 curricular focus was awareness and appreciation of the Hən̓q̓əmin̓əm̓ language and culture.

=== Carpentry ===
Cambie operates a carpentry apprenticeship program in which the 12th grade students undertake such projects as building cabins.

=== Technology ===
In 1999, Cambie was one of two Canadian schools selected to participate in a technology-sharing program with schools in Asia.

== Athletics ==
The first gymnasium was built in 1929. It was designed by McCarter and Nairne and was 50 by 110 feet in length. It included a stage and dressing rooms.

In 1995 the school received 3 million dollars to develop playing fields adjacent to the new school building. 2 million was provided by the Canada-British Columbia Infrastructure Works Program, with the remaining $1 million being provided by the community of Richmond. The project covered 17.4 hectares and included facilities for soccer, baseball, tennis, and basketball.
