= Bank of Vancouver =

The Bank of Vancouver was a Canadian chartered bank which operated 1910–1914 in British Columbia.

== Founding ==
To address a belief that Canada's chartered banks were not adequately supporting British Columbia's industry and commerce, the Bank of Vancouver was incorporated with $2 million authorized capital in April 1908. The president and driving force was Vancouver businessman Robert Purves McLennan. However, the founding directors, which included Lieutenant Governor Thomas Wilson Paterson and William Harold Malkin, lacked banking experience.

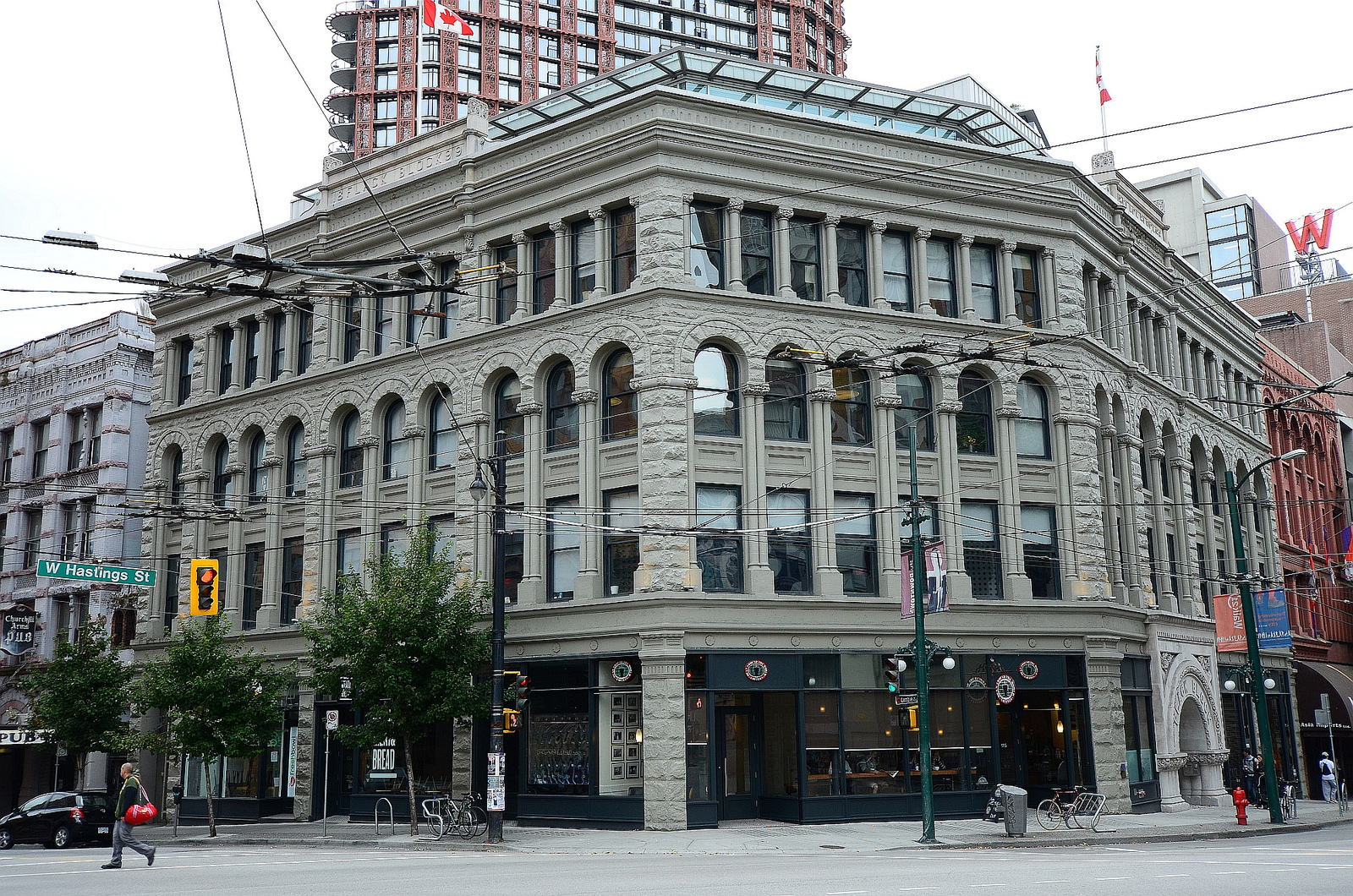
Flack Block, downtown Vancouver, 2012.

== Expansion ==
When the bank opened in July 1910, BC was in the midst of an industrial and real estate boom with investment funds readily available from world capital markets. The first branch and headquarters were in the Flack Block on the corner of Hastings and Cambie streets. The issued capital was $1,169,900 and paid-up capital $830,000. By 1913, the bank had four branches in Vancouver, two in Victoria and individual ones in New Westminster, Collingwood, Cedar Cottage, Coquitlam, Hazelton, Fort George, and Fort Fraser. The Chilliwack and Broadway (Cedar Cottage) branches closed in 1912 and 1913, respectively.

== Demise ==
The economic boom ended in 1912, culminating in the North American recession which continued until the onset of World War I. The Vancouver Island Coal Miners' Strike, which lasted from 1912 to 1914, also impacted the economy. During this period, the bank struggled. By January 1914, the paid-up capital was $873,838, and absorption by another financial institution became critical for survival. At this time, British and German capital began leaving BC because of fears of impending war. The failure of the Dominion Trust Company in October 1914 shook public confidence in financial institutions. A trickle of withdrawals led to a bank run, forcing the bank to cease trading in December 1914. The Supreme Court ruled in 1917 that stockholders had to settle the $282,295 of unpaid capital. In 1935, the affairs of the bank were finally wound up.

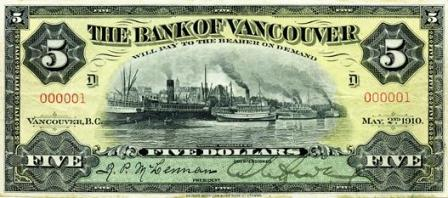
$5 banknote issued by the Bank of Vancouver, 1910.

== Banknotes ==
The banknotes issued were in $5, $10, $20, $50 and $100 denominations. Most of the $325,000 of notes in circulation at the time of collapse were probably redeemed by other banks and then cancelled by punching. Only nine uncancelled Bank of Vancouver banknotes are known to exist. Possibly further notes are held in private collections. In July 2008, a $5 banknote sold for $28,750. In June 2010, the first such one issued (serial number 000001) sold at auction for $177,000.
