= Flack Block =

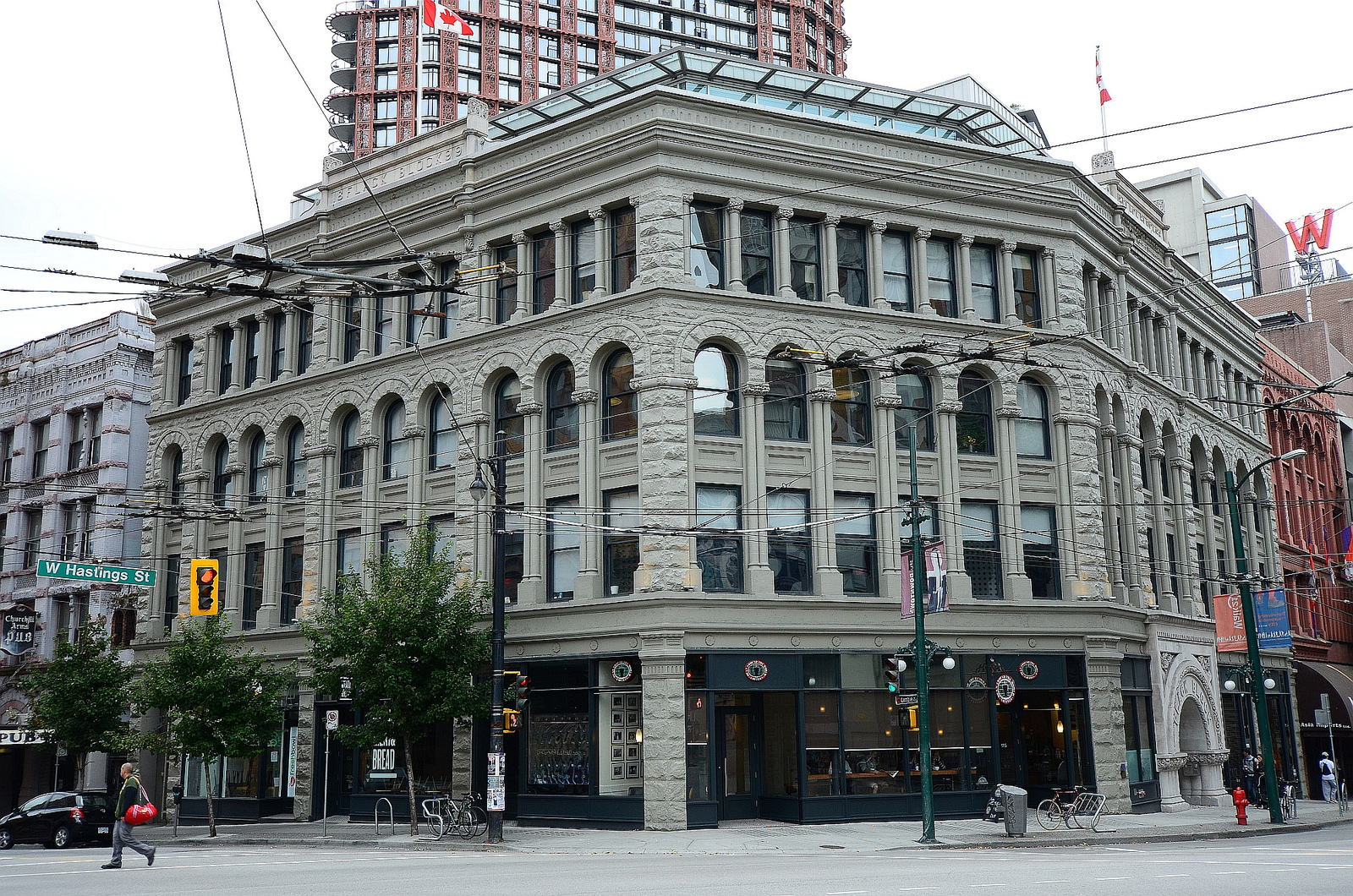
- Interactive map of the Flack Block area
- Alternative names: Copp Building

General information
- Type: Commercial office and retail building
- Architectural style: Romanesque Revival
- Location: 163–175 West Hastings Street, Vancouver, British Columbia, Canada
- Coordinates: 49.2820°N 123.1093°W
- Year built: 1899–1900
- Renovated: 2007–2008

Technical details
- Structural system: Load-bearing masonry
- Material: Rough-dressed sandstone, brick, granite
- Floor count: 4 (plus 2008 rooftop addition)

Design and construction
- Architect: William Blackmore
- Developer: Thomas Flack

Renovating team
- Architect: Acton Ostry Architects

The Flack Block is a four-storey heritage commercial building located at 163–175 West Hastings Street, at the corner of Hastings and Cambie streets, in downtown Vancouver, British Columbia, Canada. Designed in 1898 and built in 1899–1900, it was commissioned by Thomas Flack, who had made his fortune as one of the first prospectors to strike it rich in the Klondike Gold Rush, and was designed by the architect William Blackmore in the Romanesque Revival style. One of the largest buildings constructed in Vancouver during the Klondike era, it faced the city's first provincial courthouse across what is now Victory Square and became a landmark component of the early retail and commercial fabric of West Hastings Street.

After decades of decline, the Flack Block underwent a two-year, $20-million restoration led by Acton Ostry Architects for the developer The Salient Group, reopening in 2008. The project—which recreated the building's lost hand-carved stone entrance archway and added a steel-and-glass rooftop pavilion—earned a City of Vancouver Heritage Award and the Heritage BC Outstanding Achievement Award, and is credited with helping to initiate the revitalization of West Hastings Street.

== Thomas Flack and the Klondike Gold Rush ==
The building's patron, Thomas Flack, was a resident of Nanaimo, British Columbia, who was among the prospectors to make a fortune in the Klondike Gold Rush after gold was discovered in the Klondike in 1896. Returning to the coast with his Klondike wealth, he commissioned the commercial block on West Hastings Street that bears his name in 1898—his principal legacy in Vancouver.

Vancouver served as a major supply and transportation centre during the Klondike Gold Rush, and the resulting boom in mercantile trade and construction transformed West Hastings Street into the city's principal retail and commercial thoroughfare. The Flack Block, as one of the largest and most elaborate structures of the period, both reflected and accelerated that transformation.

== History ==
=== Construction ===
Thomas Flack commissioned the building in 1898 on a prominent corner lot at West Hastings and Cambie streets, opposite the first provincial courthouse on the square later known as Victory Square. The design was prepared by William Blackmore, one of the city's earliest and most prolific architects, and was among the largest commercial works of his career. Construction took place in 1899–1900, and the building has served as office and shop space since its completion. The building was also historically known as the Copp Building.

=== Tenants ===
Over its first decades the Flack Block attracted the professional and commercial tenants characteristic of West Hastings Street's emergence as a shopping and business district, including barristers, physicians, and dentists alongside retail establishments. During the First World War, the building housed recruiting offices for the Royal Flying Corps.

=== Decline ===
As the commercial centre of gravity in downtown Vancouver shifted westward and southward in the mid-twentieth century, the West Hastings district declined, and the Flack Block deteriorated along with it. The building's elaborate carved sandstone entrance archway, which had become structurally unsound as the stone decayed, was removed during one of several unsympathetic alterations and the opening covered over with stucco. By the early twenty-first century the building had fallen into disrepair and marginal occupancy.

== Architecture ==
=== Design and style ===
The Flack Block is a four-storey masonry commercial building designed in the Romanesque Revival style, with highly articulated stone-clad principal facades and characteristic round-arched windows framed by paired columns. It occupies an irregular corner plan beneath a flat roof and straight parapet, with its angled corner addressing Victory Square. The Canadian Register of Historic Places describes the design as demonstrating "the mature development of the Romanesque Revival commercial style, with its powerful rhythmic articulation, textured surfaces and unity of materials," conveying an image of corporate strength and security suited to the sensibilities of the late Victorian and early Edwardian era.

The principal facades are clad in rough-dressed sandstone of varied texture, with round-headed windows set with voussoirs and engaged columns, raised upon granite foundations. Entrances were originally located on both Hastings and Cambie streets.

=== The entrance archway ===
The building's most celebrated feature was its main entrance, framed by an elaborate hand-carved sandstone archway. The arch combined ornamental voussoirs with sculptural detail that included griffins, carved faces, and elaborate floral ornamentation. The archway was lost during the building's decline, when the deteriorating sandstone was judged a structural hazard and removed; its recreation became the signature element of the building's twenty-first-century restoration.

=== Materials and structure ===
In addition to its sandstone and granite exterior, the building incorporates brick construction and an interior structural system of cast-iron columns. Surviving original interior elements documented in the building's heritage record include window mouldings, millwork, stairwell tiling, and the cast-iron columns, together with underground areaways retaining their original granite block walls.

== Restoration ==
Between 2007 and 2008 the Flack Block underwent a comprehensive two-year, $20-million rehabilitation for the developer The Salient Group, with Acton Ostry Architects as architects and Glotman Simpson as structural engineers. The building reopened on 15 April 2008, and the project achieved LEED Gold certification. The work combined full heritage conservation of the exterior stonework, columns, cornice, and arched windows with extensive seismic and building-systems upgrades; internally, an open steel elevator shaft and wraparound stair were refurbished and exposed brick walls and heavy timber floors restored.

=== Stone restoration ===
The original sandstone had deteriorated to the point of being unsalvageable in places, and the lost entrance archway was reconstructed from historical photographs. Rather than sandstone, the restoration used Indiana Limestone (Standard Buff), quarried near Bloomington, Indiana, chosen for its durability and close match to the original. Roughly 36 tonnes (about 80,000 pounds) of stone were hand-carved for the project, with the reconstructed arch divided into fifteen sections and incorporating a lower ornamental arch. The carving was executed by hand from templates drawn from the historic photographs, with work carried out by Vancouver carver Tony Rogac and Architectural Masonry and stone fabricated by Red Leaf under Steffen Waite.

=== Rooftop addition ===
A new glass-and-steel fifth floor with a wraparound deck was added above the original four storeys, deliberately expressed in contemporary materials to distinguish the new construction from the historic masonry below. Reported floor areas for the completed building vary among sources; the developer describes the result as comprising roughly 31,000 square feet (2,900 m²) of office space and 7,300 square feet (680 m²) of retail.

=== Reception and awards ===
In 2009 the restoration received the City of Vancouver Heritage Award of Honour, and in 2010 the Heritage BC Outstanding Achievement Award. The project was undertaken under the City of Vancouver's heritage revitalization incentive program in partnership with Parks Canada, and was credited with helping to initiate the revitalization of West Hastings Street and the Victory Square area alongside the contemporaneous redevelopment of the nearby Woodward's site.

== William Evans Blackmore ==
William Evans Blackmore (born 20 October 1841 in West Buckland, Somerset, England) was among the first architects to practise in Vancouver. He emigrated to Canada in 1857 and worked as a carpenter and joiner in Detroit (1869–1872) and as a contractor in Winnipeg (1875–1885) before moving to Minneapolis and then, in September 1887, to Vancouver, where he opened an office as "architect & superintendent" during the rebuilding that followed the Great Vancouver Fire of June 1886.

Over the following fifteen years Blackmore secured numerous residential, commercial, institutional, and ecclesiastical commissions. His notable works include the Vancouver Opera House (1888), for which he worked from and modified plans by the Canadian Pacific Railway's architect Bruce Price; the Flack Block (1898–1900); and Wesley Methodist Church (1899–1901), a competition-winning design. In early 1900 he formed a partnership with his son, Edward E. Blackmore, as William Blackmore & Son; Edward continued the practice after his father's death in Vancouver on 10 August 1904. The Flack Block is among the largest and finest survivals of his commercial work.

== Heritage recognition ==
The Flack Block was designated a protected heritage property by the City of Vancouver under section 593 of the Vancouver Charter on 14 January 2003, and was listed on the Canadian Register of Historic Places on 27 March 2006. Its statement of significance identifies the building's heritage value in its association with Vancouver's commercial expansion during the Klondike Gold Rush, its prominent location facing Victory Square, its standing as one of the largest buildings of the Klondike era, and its architectural quality as a mature example of the Romanesque Revival commercial style by William Blackmore.

Character-defining elements recognized in the designation include the corner location facing Victory Square; the four-storey irregular plan with flat roof and straight parapet; the rough-dressed sandstone façades of varied texture; the round-headed windows with voussoirs and engaged columns; the original entrances on Hastings and Cambie streets; surviving interior window mouldings, millwork, stairwell tiling, and cast-iron columns; and the underground areaways with their original granite block walls.

== Current use ==
Following its restoration, the Flack Block returned to use as a mixed commercial building combining ground-floor retail with office space on its upper floors and in the new fifth floor. The restored building is regarded as a landmark of the Victory Square and West Hastings heritage district.

== See also ==
- List of heritage buildings in Vancouver
- Victory Square, Vancouver
- Klondike Gold Rush
- Hastings Street (Vancouver)
- Architecture of Vancouver
- Woodward's
