= Westridge, British Columbia =

Neighourhood in Burnaby, British Columbia

Coordinates: 49°17′0.5″N 122°57′22.7″W

Aerial view of Westridge in 2026

Westridge is a residential neighbourhood in Burnaby, British Columbia, Canada.

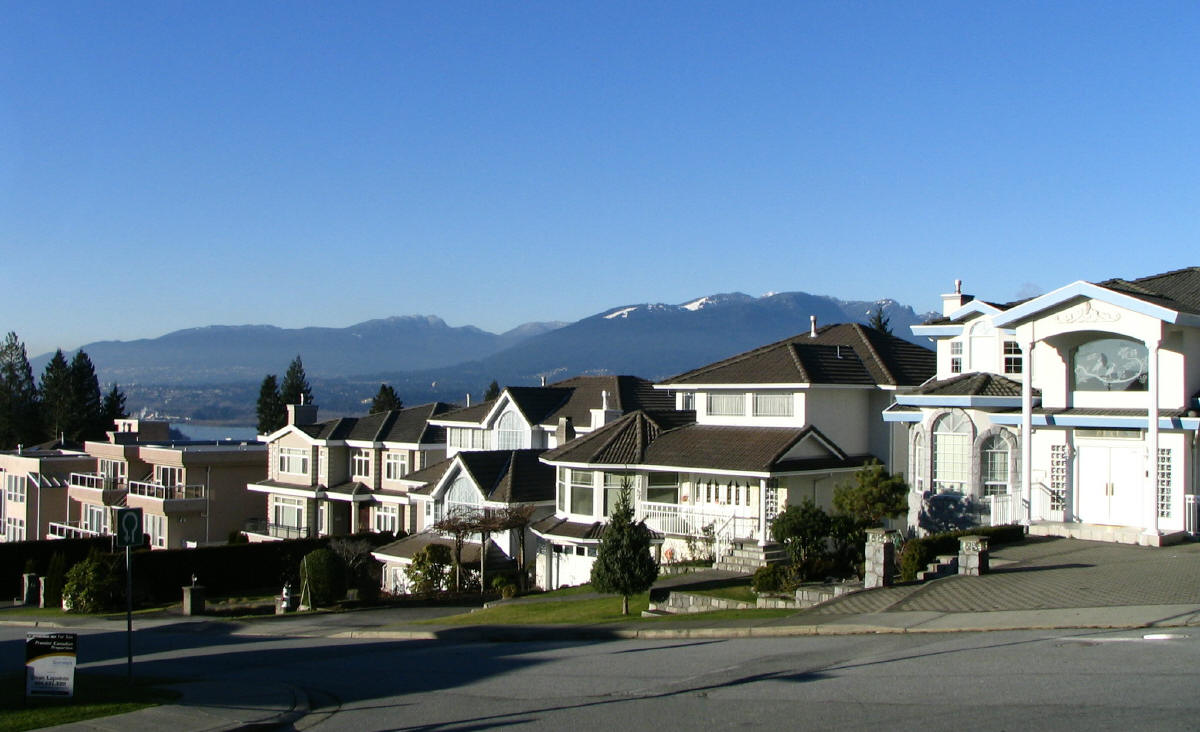
Dalla-Tina Avenue at Ridgeview Drive

== Location ==
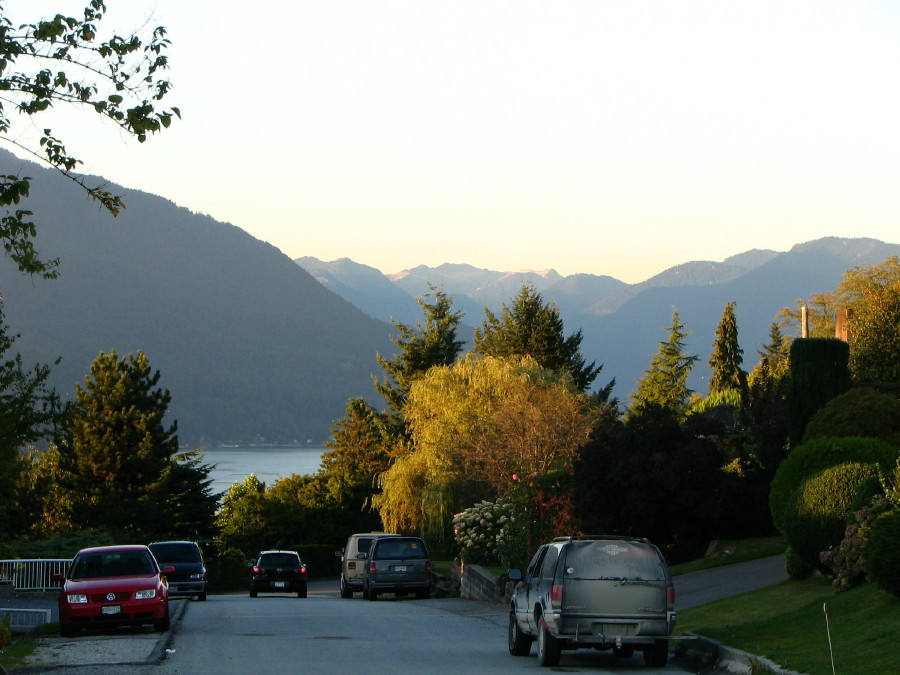
Braeside Drive with a glimpse of Burrard Inlet

Westridge is located on the western slope of Burnaby Mountain. It is sliced almost in half by Inlet Drive. The western half of it lies close to the shores of Burrard Inlet and the railway tracks on which West Coast Express runs between Downtown Vancouver and Port Moody. The eastern half of Westridge climbs quite steeply up Burnaby Mountain. Westridge is located near Simon Fraser University to which it is linked by the newly built Burnaby Mountain Parkway.

== Transportation ==
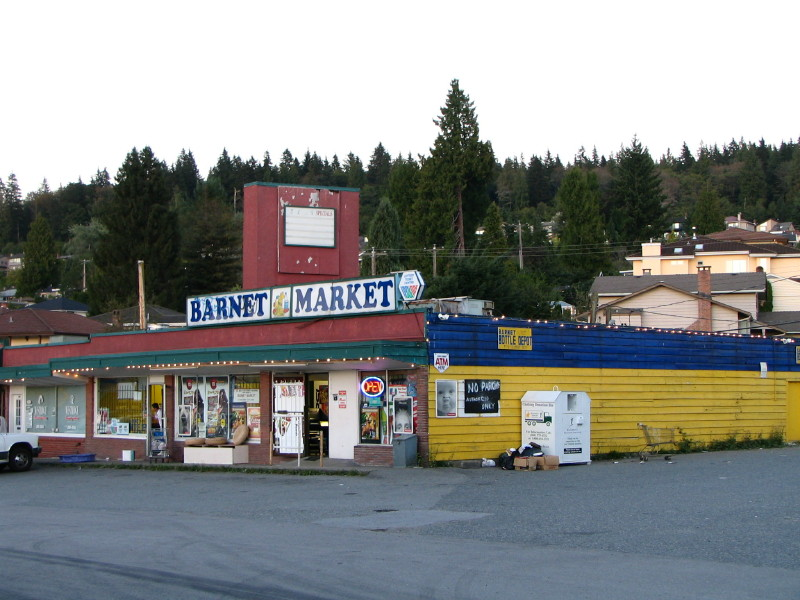
A local landmark that is no longer there - the mall was gutted by fire in 2007 and demolished in April 2008

Westridge was formerly served by the 135 bus route that ran between Downtown Vancouver and SFU; service through the neighbourhood was eventually discontinued, and the 135 was replaced by the 95 B-Line, which later became route R5 Hastings St. The R5 is still the nearest bus route, with stops along Hastings Street at Duthie Avenue. There is also the suburban 160 route, running along Inlet Drive, that serves commuters from Port Coquitlam.

== Parks and recreation ==
The biggest natural attraction in Westridge, in addition to the hiking trails of Burnaby Mountain itself, is Barnet Marine Park with its beach and views of Burrard Inlet and Indian Arm. The small Westridge Park west of Inlet Drive near its intersection with Hastings Street offers a children's playground and some tennis courts.

== 2007 oil spill ==
In July 2007, a large oil spill from a Kinder-Morgan pipeline ruptured by Cusano Contracting, working for the City of Burnaby, caused a major ecological damage to local residents' homes, the forested slopes, and the marine wildlife on the southern shore of Burrard Inlet. It also led to months of traffic disruptions on the busy Barnet Highway during the cleanup operations. According to Burnaby Now (January 5, 2008), Kinder Morgan Canada and Trans Mountain Pipeline have launched legal action against the City of Burnaby and Cusano Contracting, hired by the city to do sewer work.
