= Dominion Building =

Historic commercial building in Vancouver, British Columbia, Canada

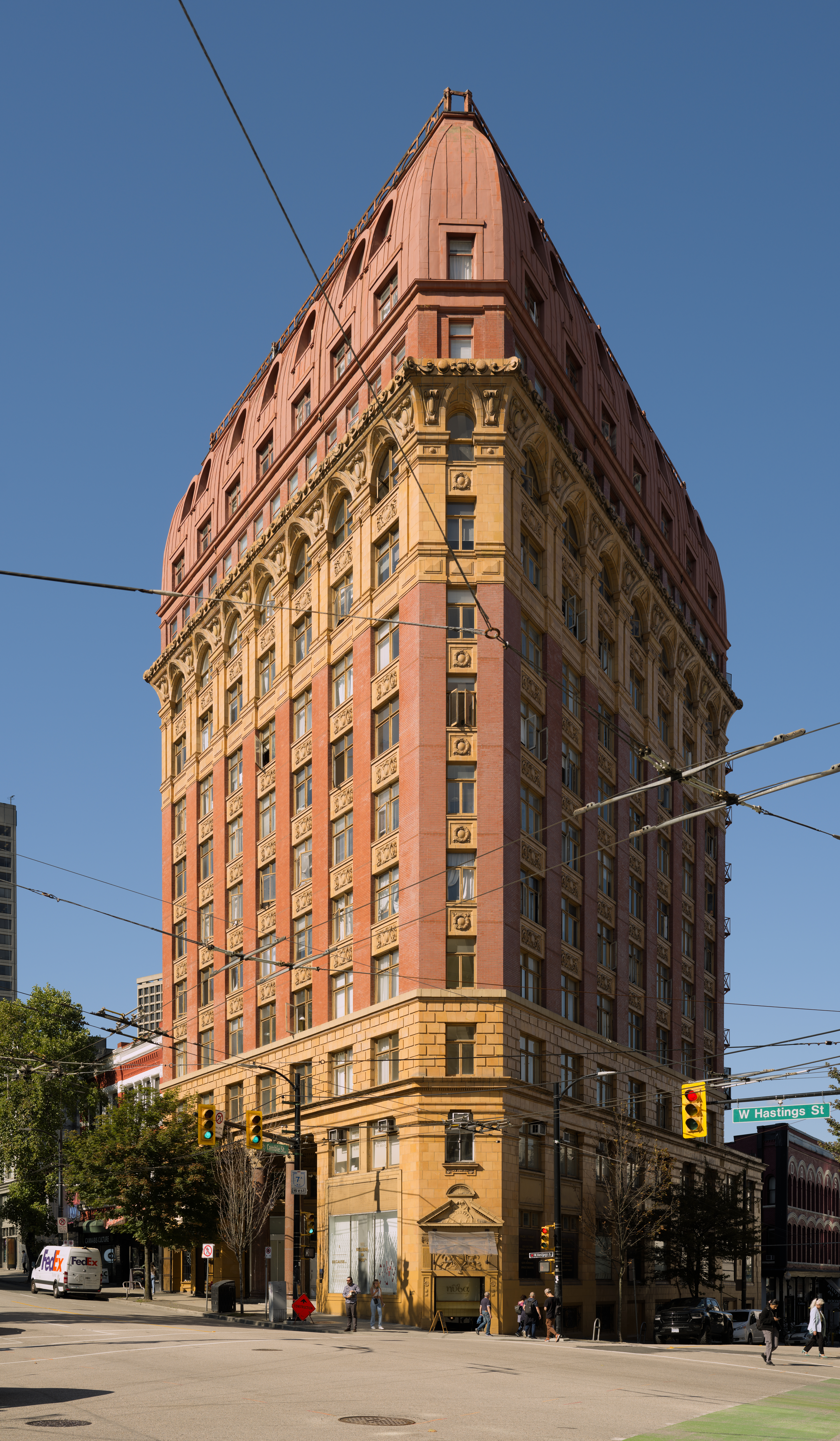
- Interactive map of the Dominion Building area
- Alternative names: Dominion Trust Building

General information
- Type: Commercial offices
- Architectural style: Second Empire
- Location: 207 West Hastings Street; Vancouver, British Columbia
- Coordinates: 49.2825°N 123.11°W
- Construction started: 1906
- Completed: 1910

Height
- Roof: 44.8 m (147 ft)

Technical details
- Floor count: 13

Design and construction
- Architects: J.S. Helyer and Son

The Dominion Building (originally Dominion Trust Building) is a commercial building in Vancouver, British Columbia, Canada. Located on the edge of Gastown (207 West Hastings St), it was Vancouver's first steel-framed high-rise. Its architect was John S. Helyer, who is said to have died after falling off the staircase in the front of the building, though this is an urban legend.

The financier of the structure was the Count Alvo von Alvensleben from Germany, who was active in Vancouver's financial scene at the time. It was known generally that von Alvensleben was one of the Kaiser's godsons. It was held at the time that he was a front for the Kaiser's money, which carried the suggestion that the Empire's tallest building had been built by its greatest rival, a rumour which disregards the fact that the tallest building in the Empire was in fact the Trader’s Bank Building in Toronto, completed in 1906 at 55.39m in height.

Today it is a provincially designated Class "A" heritage structure.

Owned by Newton Investments Limited, it was restored by restoration expert Read Jones Christofferson. The building's tenants have included film/TV production company, Haddock Entertainment, numerous law firms, clothing designers, Dae photo studio, record labels, antiquarian booksellers, Kokoro Dance, professional web developers, marketing agency, Bowery Creative, the office of the Green Party of Vancouver, a dentist, non-profit organizations such as Living Oceans Society and Fair Trade Vancouver and a Lebanese restaurant, Nuba.

The Dominion Building sits across the street from Victory Square, site of the former provincial courthouse, which was relocated to Georgia Street in 1913. The Dominion Building was at the hub of the city's financial and legal district until that move.

The backside of the building (containing the emergency staircases) and Cambie Street was filmed during the street scenes of The Neverending Story. It can be seen from Water Street.

The Dominion Building can also be seen at the end of Jennifer Lopez's 2023 film,The Mother, as she looks down into Victory Square from the 14th floor, nearing the end of the film.

The Dominion Building, as well as other elements of Victory Square, were filmed for scenes in an abandoned city in Battlestar Galactica.

The initial rooftop chase scene from Blade: Trinity was shot at the Dominion building.

The 2012 TV show Alcatraz also used this as a location in the opening episode, although the program was set in San Francisco, much of the location work was done in Vancouver. The Dominion building can also be seen in the background later in the series when a landmine is found in Victory Square.

Can Lit. author Timothy Taylor. maintains a writing office in this building.

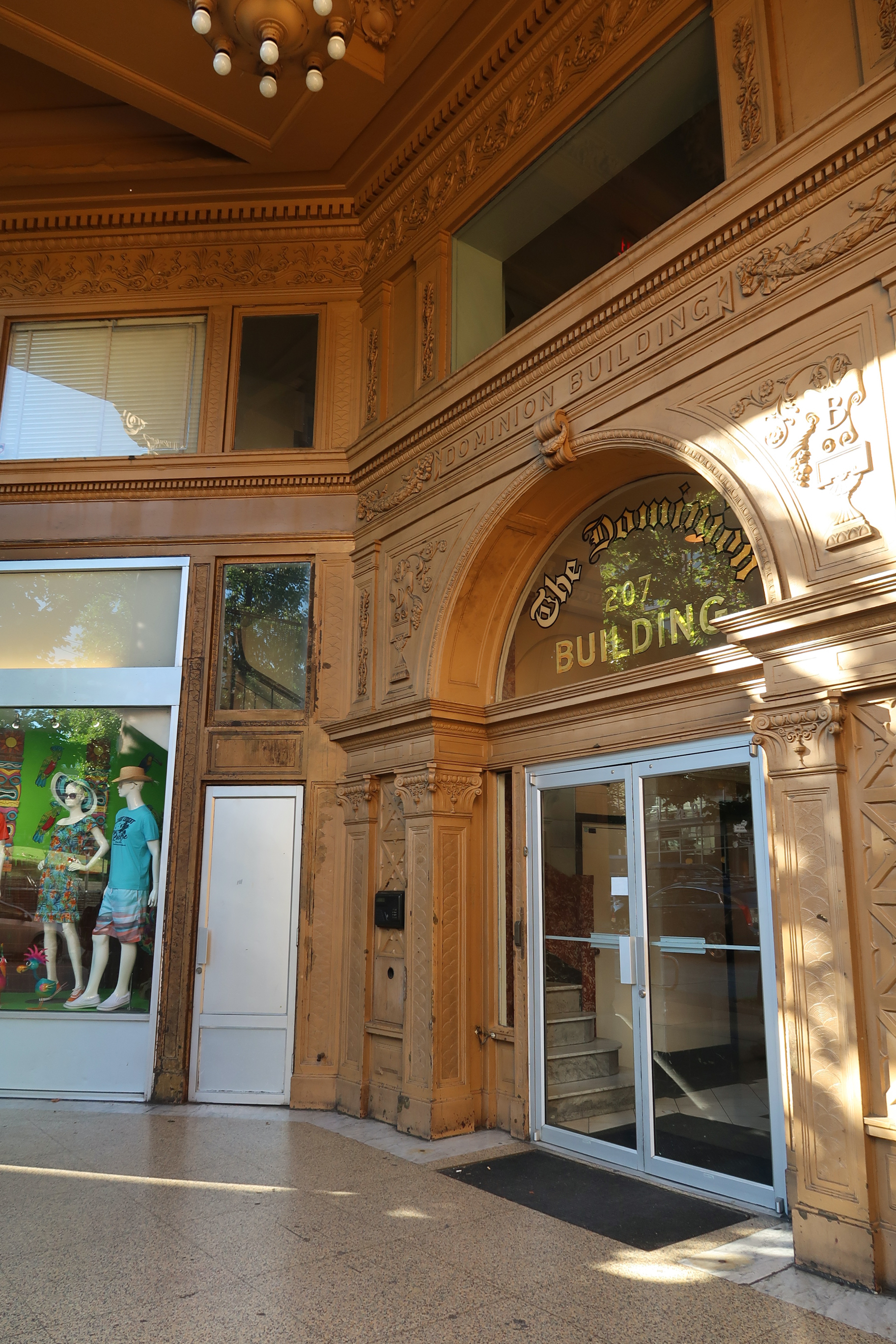
Entrance

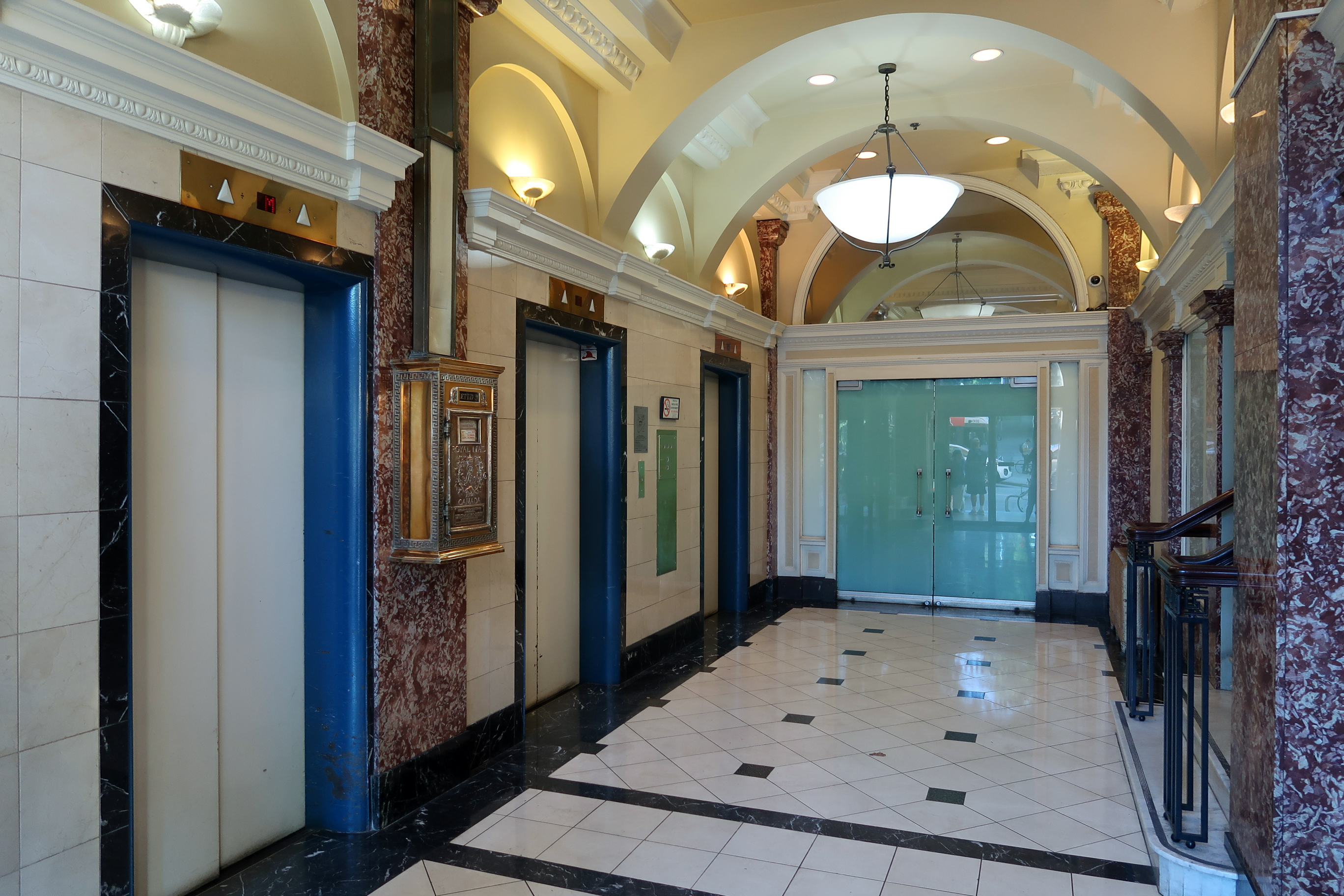
Lobby

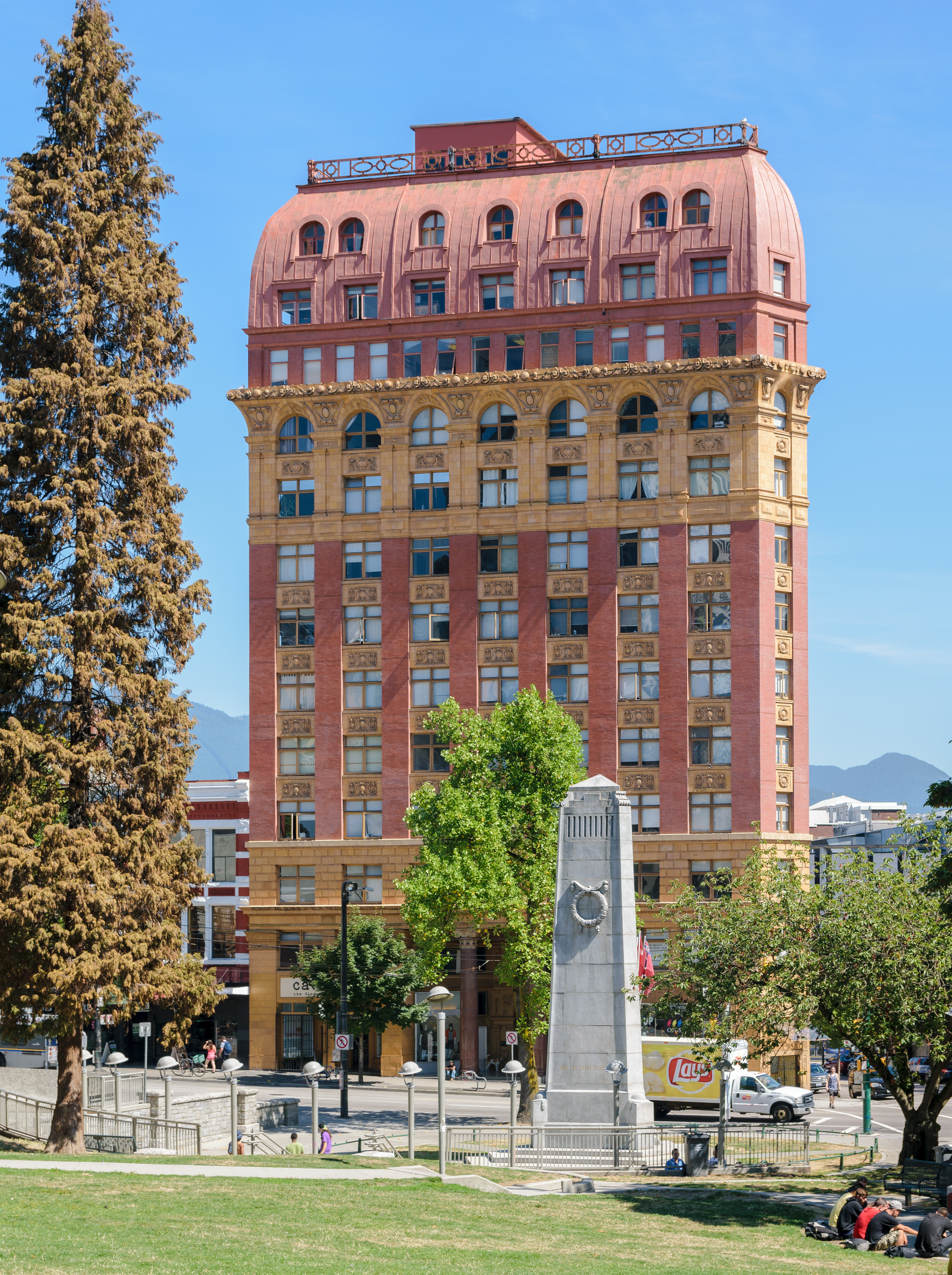
View north from Victory Square

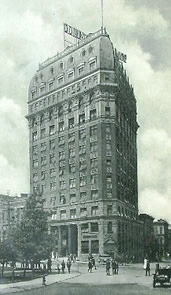
The Dominion Building in 1915

== See also ==
- List of tallest and other historical buildings in Vancouver
- Woodward's 43 - a nearby skyscraper echoing the design of the Dominion Building.

== In television and film ==
In The NeverEnding Story (film), Building is seen in closing scene, when Bastian is flying with Falkor, to get some revenge over the kids.
