= Victory Square, Vancouver =

Park in Vancouver, Canada

Victory Square
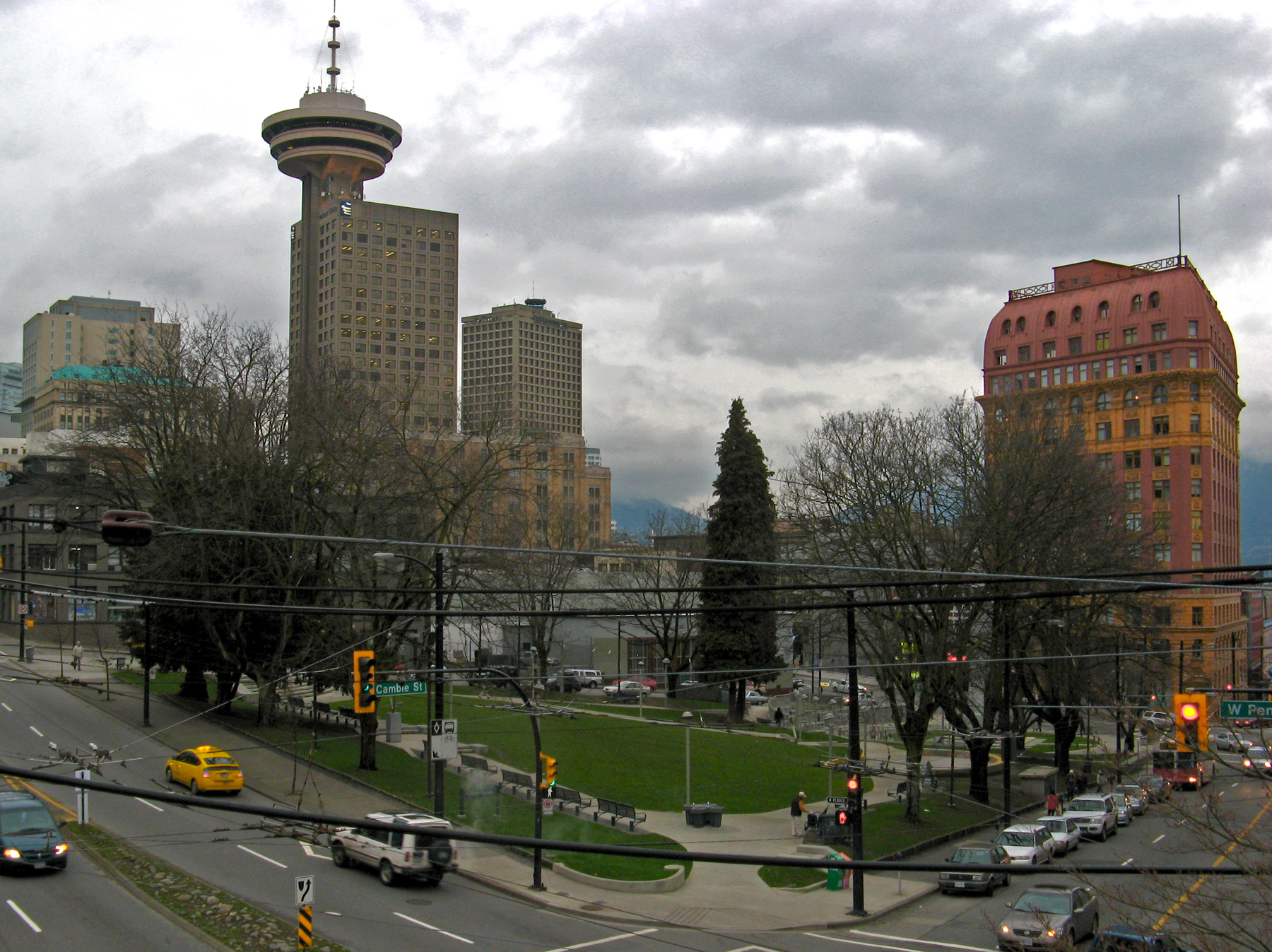
- Victory Square park, Vancouver
- Interactive map of Victory Square
- Type: Public Park
- Location: Vancouver, British Columbia
- Coordinates: 49°16′55.56″N 123°06′36.72″W
- Area: 0.9 acres (0.36 ha)
- Created: 1886
- Operator: City of Vancouver

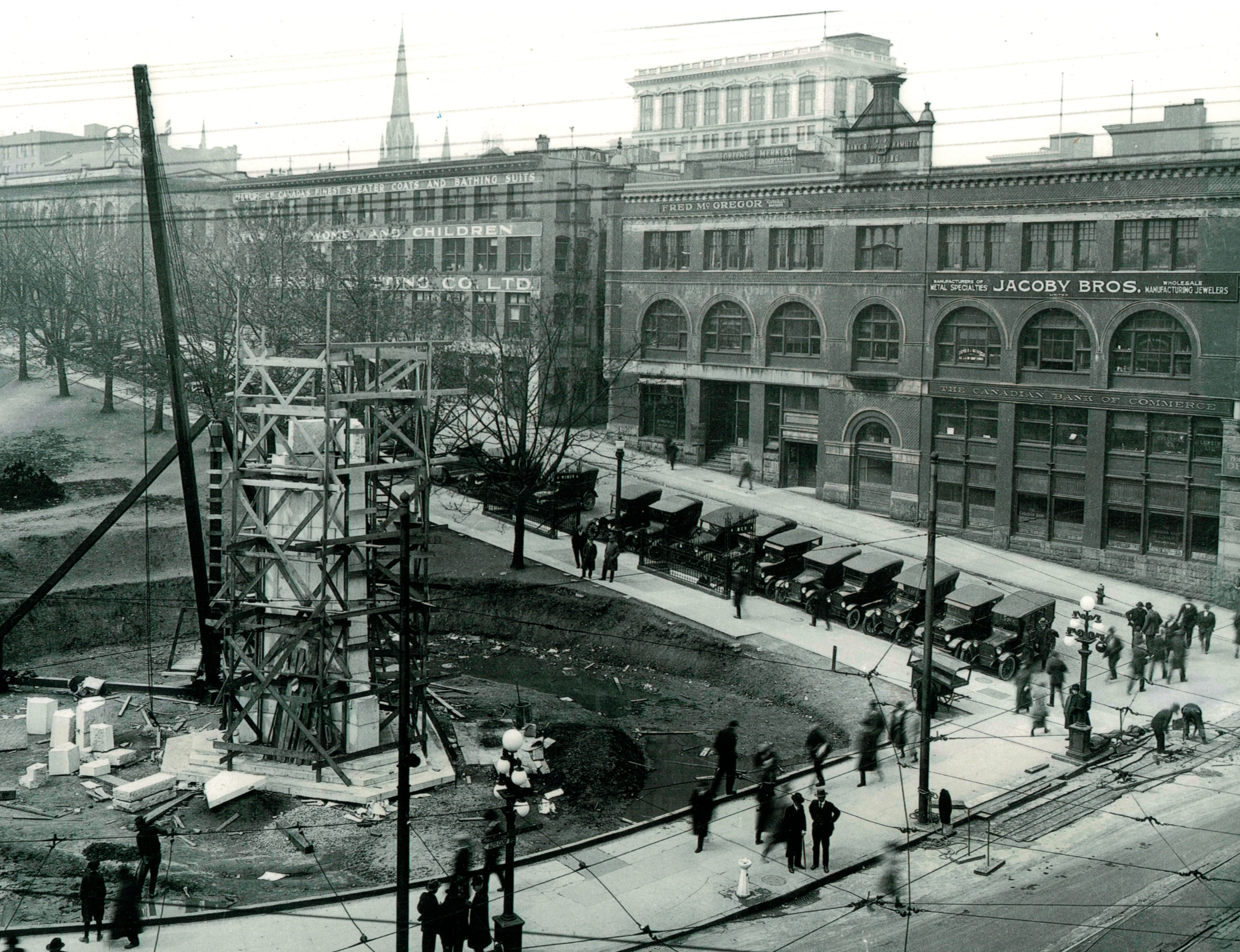

Victory Square is a park in Vancouver, British Columbia, Canada. The square is bordered by West Hastings Street to the northeast, West Pender Street to the southwest, Cambie Street to the southeast, and Hamilton Street to the northwest. The term is also used to refer to the neighbourhood immediately surrounding the square.

== History ==
Victory Square was at one time the grounds of the city's provincial courthouse, which was torn down in 1911–1913 when the new Francis Rattenbury-designed courthouse on Georgia Street was opened (now the Vancouver Art Gallery). The location had significance when it was chosen, as it stands at the intersection of the old Granville townsite (aka Gastown) and the CPR Townsite, which was the downtown-designated land grant obtained by the CPR as part of the deal to locate the terminus and thereby found the city (the corner of Hastings and Hamilton is the northern tip of the CPR Townsite). An area of 0.9 acres (3,600 m^{2}) out of the 480 acres (1.9 km^{2}) allotted to the CPR was held aside as "Government Square" on February 13, 1886. The southwest corner of Hamilton and Hastings Streets is where L. A. Hamilton drove the first survey stake to commence laying out the street system for the city. The Victory Square Cenotaph was unveiled on 27 April 1924

Boyd & Clendenning were contracted by the CPR to begin felling the forest at a rate of $26/acre ($64/ha) and an extra $2/acre ($4.9/ha) for lopping off large branches. A tangled mass soon built up to 6.1 metres (20 ft) thick that was to be the kindling for the great fire that leveled the townsite.

It was down the park's hillside that the clearing crews of the CPR entered Gastown a few steps ahead of the firestorm that destroyed the city on June 13, 1886, heading for their quarters in the Regina Hotel at Cambie and Water where they had themselves stored water and wetted blankets as safety precaution (it was the only building in that part of the city to survive the fire). Until that year, however, the site of Victory Square as with all of the downtown peninsula outside of Gastown had been dense west coast rainforest, with trees standing in dark, thick groves hundreds of feet high and also a small creek (now vanished).

During the old courthouse's tenure the vicinity was the hub of the city's financial and legal district, with the Vancouver curb exchange operating just across Hastings Street, mostly in a passageway cutting the corner diagonally behind the Astor Hotel (see photos in External links). The Inns of Court, a ramshackle and infamously leaky (if decorative) structure on the west side of Courthouse Square, was the location of adjutant legal services and offices connected to the Court House. The Oddfellows Hall and what is now the Army, Navy and Air Force Veterans Hall still stand further south (uphill) along Hamilton Street from where the Inns of Court used to be (now a modernist bank-cum-film studio). Most of the original main branches of the major banks were within the next few blocks west along Hastings, which in both directions was the hub of the city's shopping district until the completion of Pacific Centre in the 1970s, which severed the old pedestrian link between Woodward's, a block east of Victory Square, and Eaton's, two blocks west (now the SFU Harbour Centre campus). On the south side of Victory Square originally stood the Central School, which later became the original Vancouver Community College (then named Vancouver College), adjacent to which was the city's original main hospital (both were in a brickwork Gothic style).

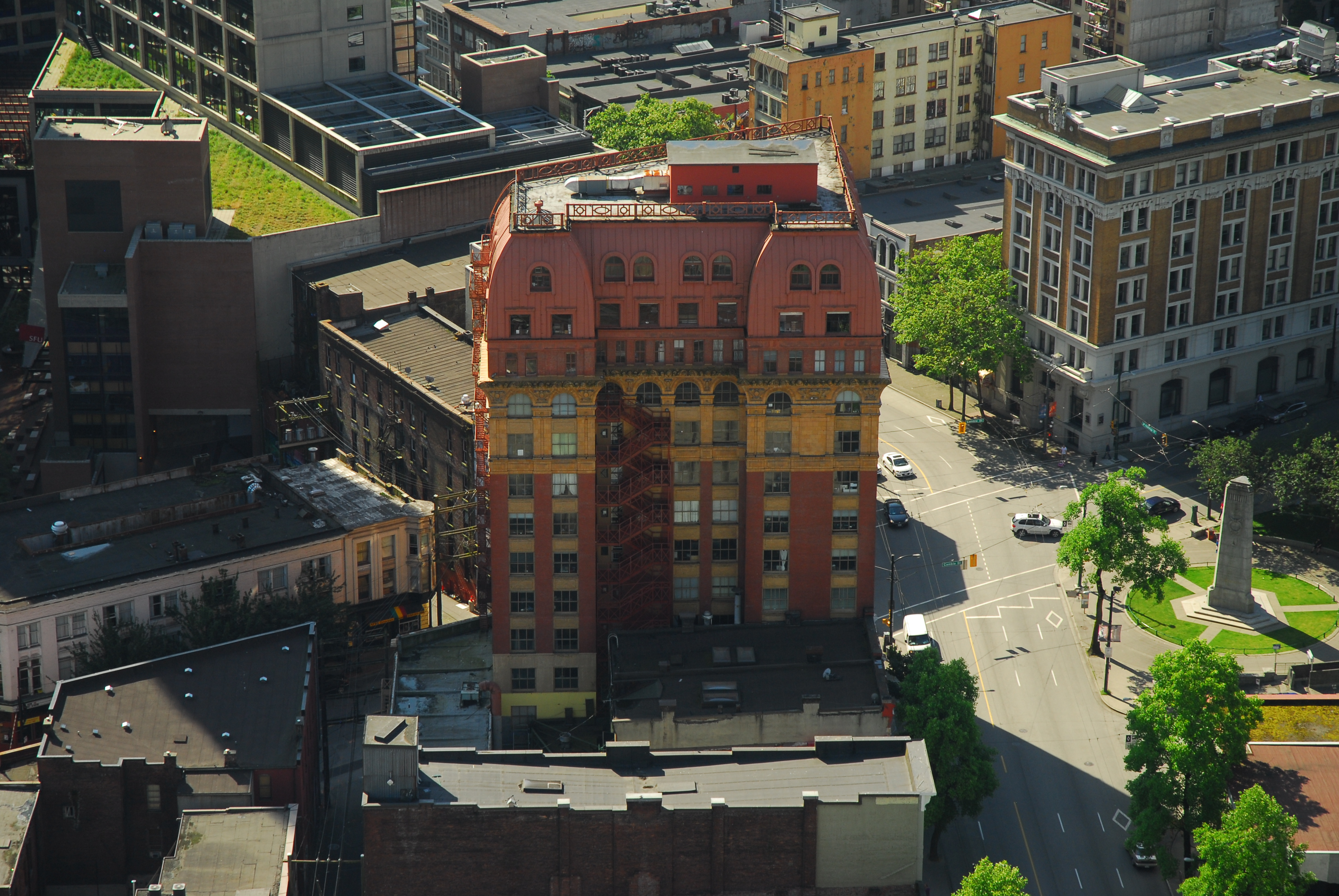
Completed in 1910, the Dominion Building is one of several historic buildings adjacent to Victory Square.

Even once it was known that the courthouse was to be demolished, major construction continued to line the square where it had been. The Province, Sun and Dominion Buildings went up in rapid succession in the last years of the courthouse's existence, and remain today, although no longer as newspaper buildings. The maple trees on the Pender Street side of the park are the oldest street trees in the city, planted in 1897.

== Victory Square Cenotaph ==
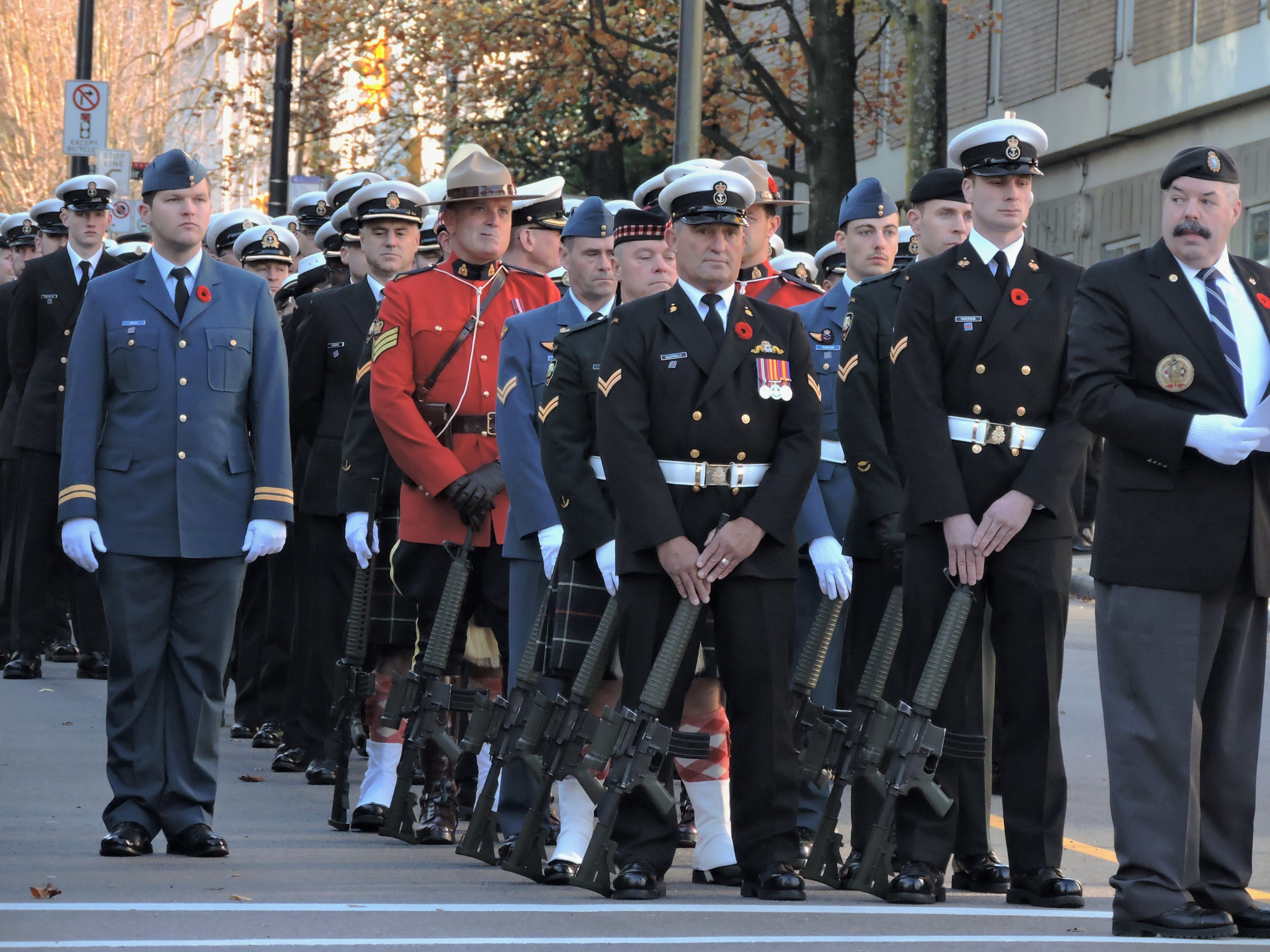
A Canadian Forces and RCMP guard of honour at the Remembrance Day services on Victory Square, 11 November 2014.

On the northern side of the square, on a plaza flanking Hastings Street, lies the Vancouver war memorial, the Victory Square Cenotaph. The cenotaph is approximately 30 feet (9.1 m) tall, and is a triangular edifice whose shape conforms to that of the square. The pillar is of Nelson Island granite engraved with suitable inscriptions, and is kept continuously banked high with wreaths of flowers and adorned with national flags.

The cenotaph was unveiled by William Reid Owen, Mayor of Vancouver, in the presence of an assemblage of 25,000 persons; naval, military and civilian, and including the Old Contemptibles, 7th British Columbia, 29th Vancouver, 72nd Seaforths, 2nd Canadian Mounted Rifles, 47th New Westminster, and 102nd North British Columbian Battalions, CEF, and others, on 27 April 1924. It was dedicated by Major Cecil C. Owen, chaplain of the 29th (Vancouver) Battalion, CEF.

To the Glory of God, and in thankful remembrance of those who served their King and Country overseas in the cause of truth, righteousness and freedom.

The 24th Psalm was read by Lieutenant-Colonel G.O. Fallis, of the Methodist Church, and the music included "O Canada" (Buchan); "O God, Our Help in Ages Past"; "Lochaber No More" (bagpipes); "For All the Saints"; "Last Post" and "God Save the King". The first wreath, being the tribute of the Corporation and Citizens of Vancouver, was placed by W.R. Owen, wife of the mayor.

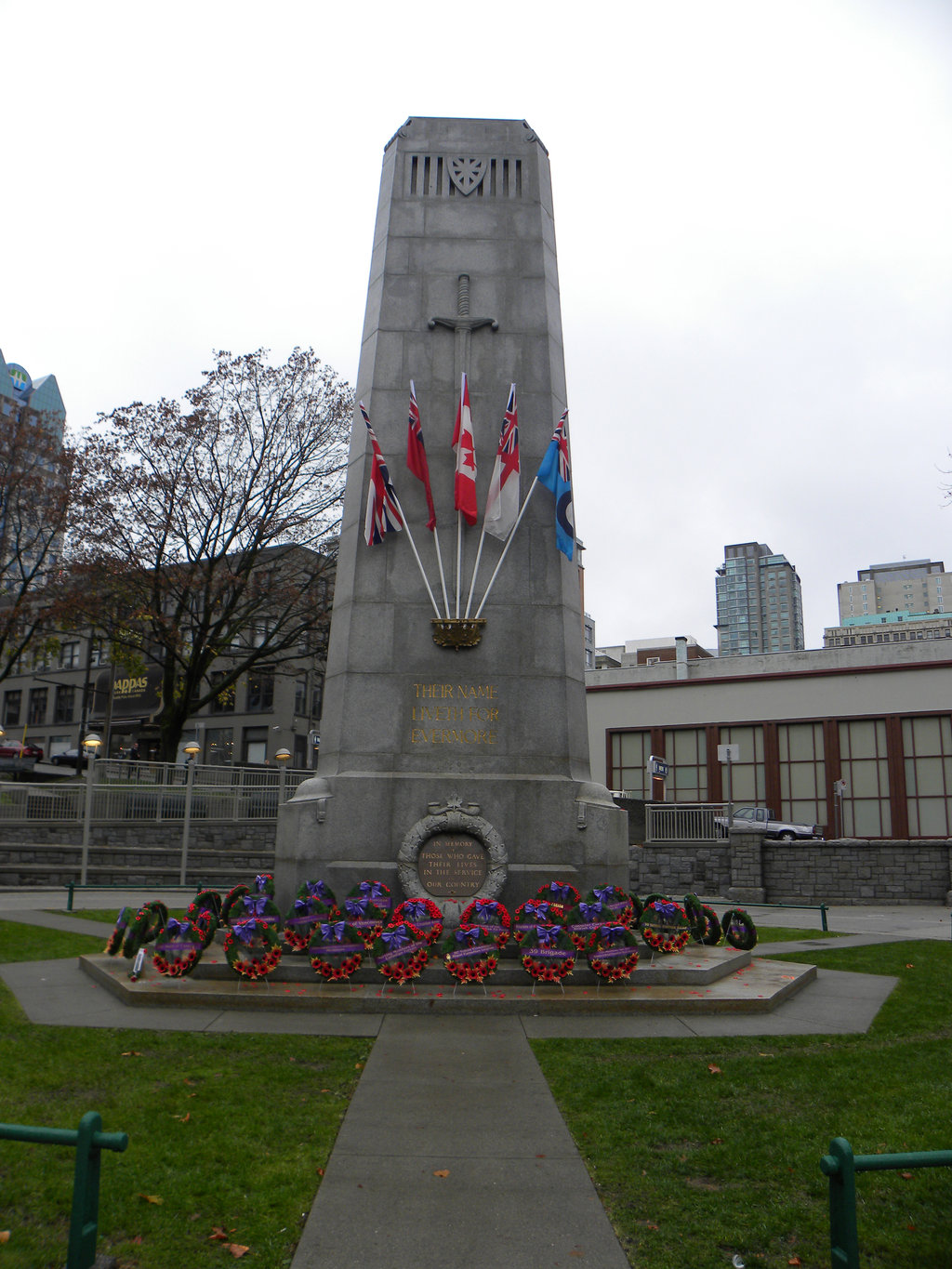
Victory Square Cenotaph is on the northern side of the square.

The ornamentations on the stone include one long sword and two wreaths, one of laurels, the other of poppies; both entwined with maple leaves. A stone replica of the steel helmet, as used in the war of 1914–1918, adorns three corner buttresses. A larger wreath of laurels surrounds the numerals "1914–1918" at the base of the front. Slots in a receptacle of three bronze maple leaves hold the staffs of the Union Jack, the Canadian Red Ensign, the Flag of Canada, the White Ensign, and RCAF Ensign, always flying, which are placed there by the Royal Canadian Legion and the Royal Commonwealth Ex-Services League, and renewed four times each year.

Of the monument faces; one side faces Hastings Street, the others Pender and Hamilton Streets, and was designed thus by Major G.L. Thornton Sharp, architect, town planner, and park commissioner, to conform to the triangular shape of the park. It is so placed that, when approached from the east, it appears in the distance centrally at the end of busy Hastings Street. The granite was supplied by the Vancouver Granite Co., Ltd., and the erecting contractors were Stewart and Wylie. Stewart died from the effects of an accident whilst preparing the memorial. The Vancouver War Memorial Committee of 24, of which 12 represented the Canadian Club of Vancouver, and 12 the Civic War Memorial Committee, the whole under the chairmanship of F.W. Rounsefell, pioneer, and with J.R.V. Dunlop, of the Canadian Club, as honorary secretary, were the public-spirited sponsors. The cenotaph cost $10,666.

The engraved inscriptions are:

Facing Hastings Street: "Their name liveth for evermore" and, within a stone wreath, "1914–1918". Facing Hamilton Street: "Is it nothing to you". Facing Pender Street: "All ye that pass by".

The first, commencing "Their name", is from Sirach, Chapter 44, Verse 14. The second, commencing "Is it nothing", from Lamentations, Chapter 1, Verse 12. The third side represents the continuation of the verse from Lamentations.

In his valedictory address, Major Owen said:

Those whose sacrifices this Cenotaph commemorates, were among the men who, at call of King and Country, left all that was dear, endured hardship, faced danger, and finally passed out of the sight of men by the path of duty, giving their own lives that others might live in freedom. Let those who come after see to it that their names be not forgotten.

The Cenotaph continues to be the focus of the city's annual Remembrance Day services.

The site of the Cenotaph is significant because it was at tables at the foot of the old courthouse steps where men signed up for the First World War in 1914—which was symbolic for the enlistees because of the strong royalist sentiment in the city, as it was on the courthouse steps where the main ceremonials of the various royal visits to Vancouver had taken place. The courthouse was the location of many official ceremonies, particularly the royal visits of the Duke and Duchess of Cornwall and York in 1901 and the Prince Arthur, Duke of Connaught and Strathearn in 1912.
