= Hastings Street (Vancouver) =

Street in British Columbia, Canada

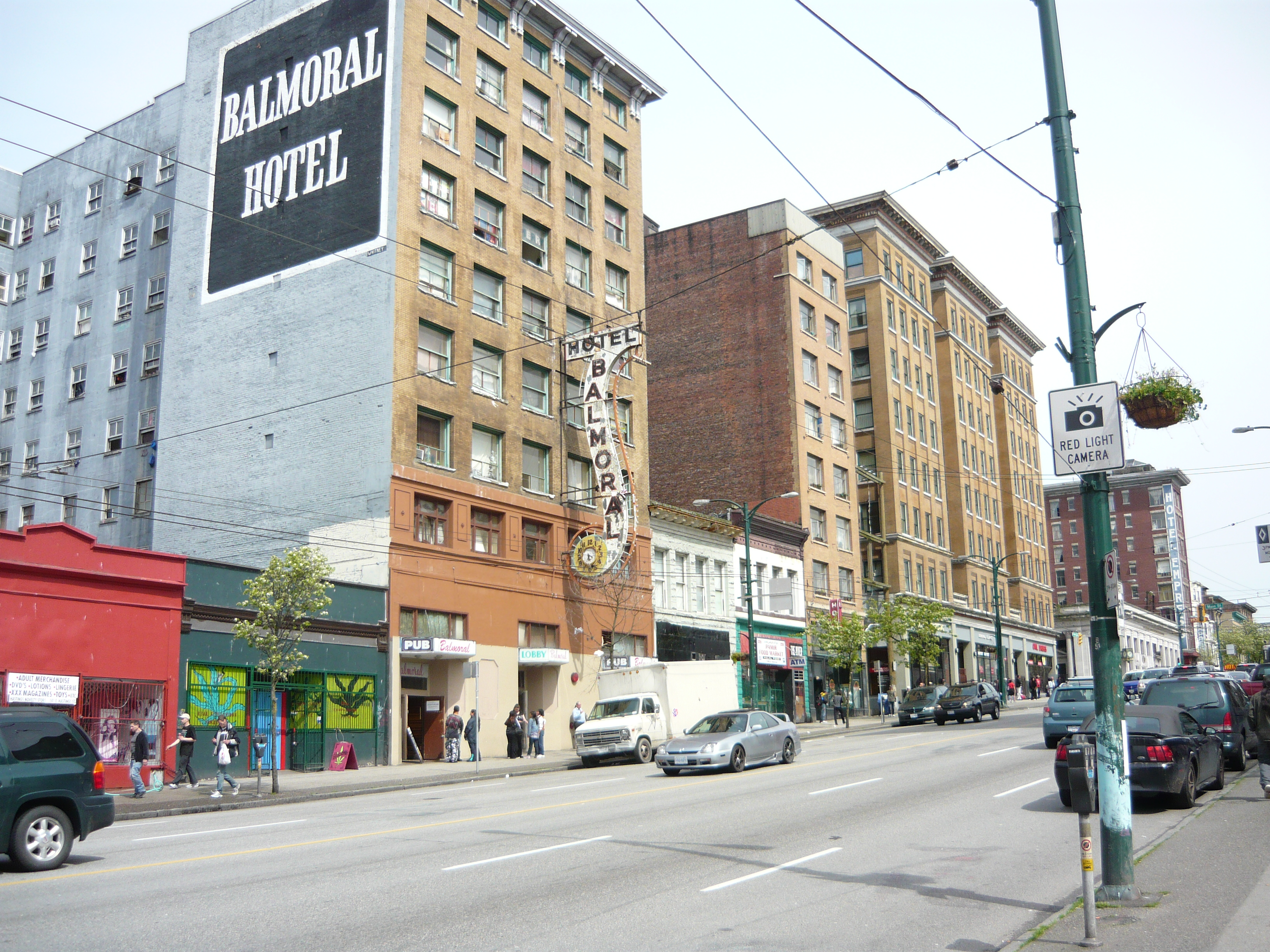
- 100 Block East Hastings Street (north side) near Columbia Street
- Part of: Highway 7A (former)
- Namesake: George Fowler Hastings
- Length: 13.4 km (8.3 mi)
- Location: Vancouver, Burnaby, British Columbia, Canada
- Nearest metro station: Waterfront station
- West end: Cardero Street
- Major junctions: Granville Street; Main Street; Highway 1 (TCH); Barnet Highway
- East end: Burnaby Mountain Parkway

Hastings Street is an east–west traffic corridor in the cities of Vancouver and Burnaby, British Columbia, Canada. It used to be a part of the decommissioned Highway 7A. In the central business district of downtown Vancouver, it is known as West Hastings Street; at Carrall Street it becomes East Hastings Street and runs eastwards through East Vancouver and Burnaby. In Burnaby, there is no east-west designation. The street ends in Westridge, a neighbourhood at the foot of Burnaby Mountain where it joins Burnaby Mountain Parkway and diverges from the continuation of the former Highway 7A as the Barnet Highway, to Port Moody, British Columbia.

== Route description ==
Formally named in 1885 for Rear-Admiral George Fowler Hastings of the Royal Navy, the street runs past such well-known Vancouver landmarks as the Marine Building, the Vancouver Club, Sinclair Centre, Harbour Centre (once Spencer's, Eaton's, then Sears and now the downtown campus of Simon Fraser University), Dominion Building and Victory Square (the location of the city's original courthouse) and the Woodward's Building; located in the old Dunn's Tailors building at Homer and West Hastings is the campus of the Vancouver Film School, while on the corner of Cambie is the Carter-Cotton Building, the former headquarters of the Vancouver Province newspaper. East of Woodward's, the street forms the heart of Vancouver's historic original downtown, once known as the Great White Way because of its neon displays, and which is today the Downtown Eastside. Through the East End, after a stretch of warehouse-type commercial and wholesale businesses, the street forms one of the commercial cores for Vancouver's Italian community in a mixed-ethnicity retail area in the area of Nanaimo Street, just east of which the Pacific National Exhibition and Playland are on the city of Vancouver's eastern fringe. After leaving Vancouver, Hastings forms the core of a Burnaby retail neighbourhood known as the Heights and then traverses Capitol Hill to the Lochdale and Westridge areas.

== Major intersections ==
From west to east.

Location	km	mi	Destinations	Notes
Vancouver	0.0	0.0	Cardero Street	
Vancouver	0.0– 0.1	0.0– 0.062	Bicycles & pedestrians only	
Vancouver	0.1	0.062	Nicola Street	
Vancouver	1.0	0.62	Burrard Street	
Vancouver	1.2	0.75	Howe Street	One-way, southwest bound; west end of former Highway 7A concurrency; to Highway 99 south
Vancouver	1.3	0.81	Granville Street	Granville Mall (transit only) south of Hastings Street; near Waterfront station
Vancouver	1.4	0.87	Seymour Street	One-way, northeast-bound
Vancouver	1.8	1.1	Cambie Street	
Vancouver	2.2	1.4	Carrall Street	One-way, southbound; division between West and East Hastings
Vancouver	2.5	1.6	Main Street	
Vancouver	4.1	2.5	Clark Drive	
Vancouver	4.6	2.9	Commercial Drive	
Vancouver	5.6	3.5	Nanaimo Street	
Vancouver	6.5	4.0	Renfrew Street	Access to Hastings Park
Vancouver	7.4	4.6	Cassiar Connector (Highway 901:2545 south / Highway 901:2546 north) to Highway 1 (TCH) – Hope, Whistler	Highway 1 passes underneath Hastings Street via the Cassiar Tunnel; Highway 1 exit 26
Vancouver–Burnaby boundary	8.0	5.0	Boundary Road	
Burnaby	9.5	5.9	Willingdon Avenue	
Burnaby	12.8	8.0	Inlet Drive (to Barnet Highway)	East end of former Highway 7A concurrency; through traffic follows Inlet Drive
Burnaby	13.4	8.3	Dalla Tina Avenue	Becomes Burnaby Mountain Parkway
Burnaby	15.4	9.6	Galgardi Way / University Drive	Continues as University Drive East to Simon Fraser University
1.000 mi = 1.609 km; 1.000 km = 0.621 mi: Closed/former; Concurrency terminus; HOV only; Route transition

== Photos ==
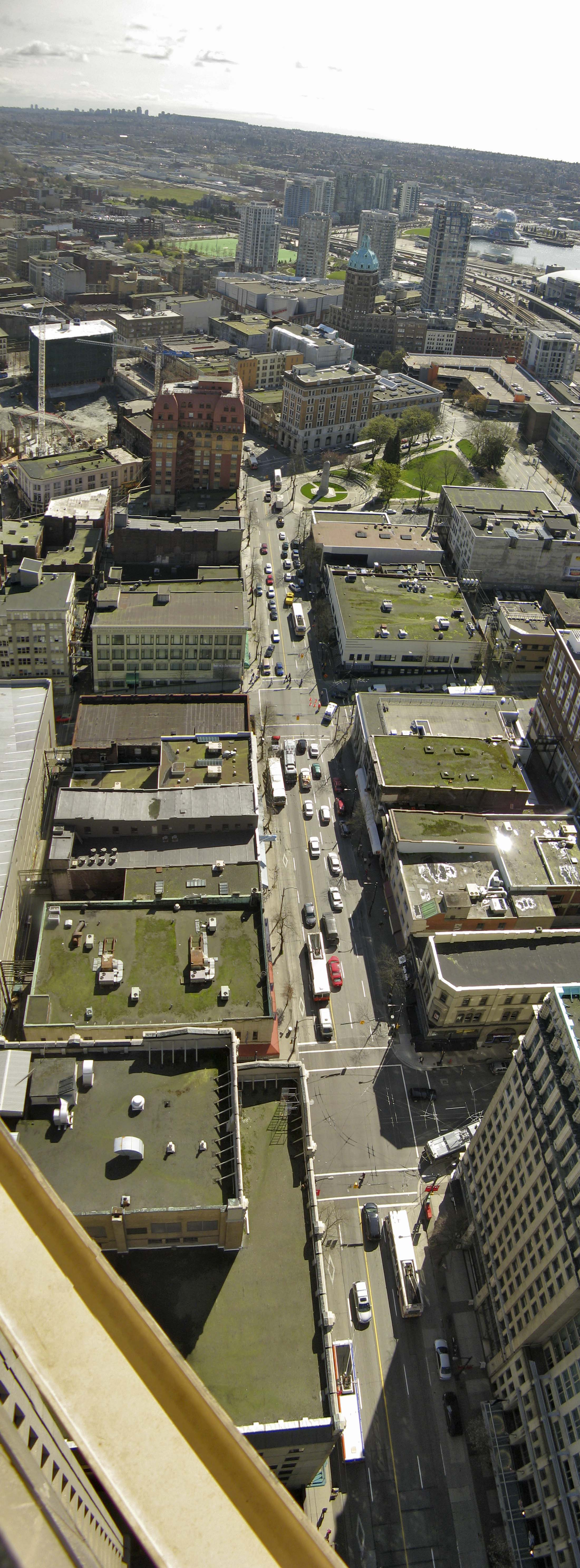
West Hastings, looking east from Harbour Centre

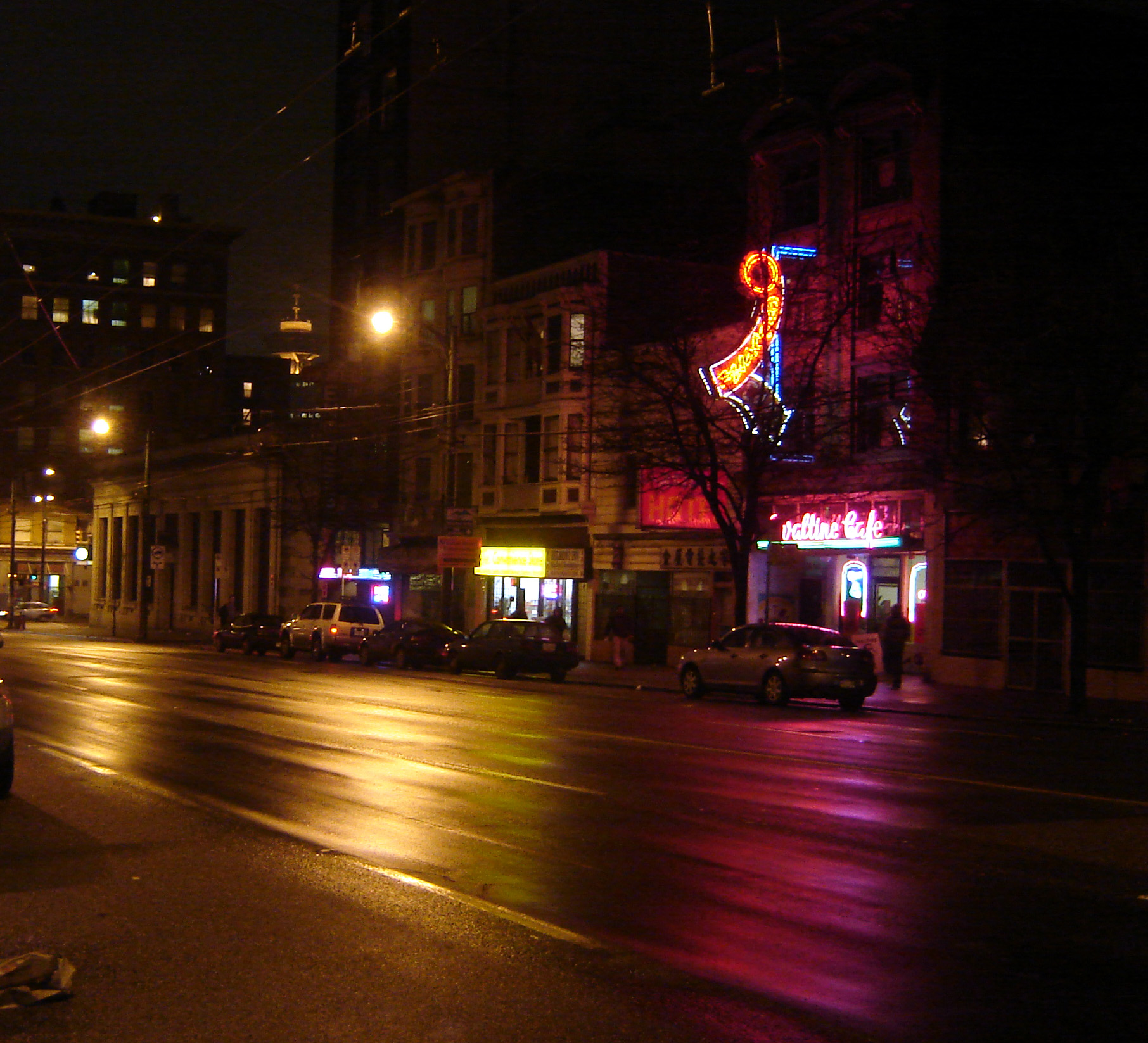
200 Block East Hastings Street (north side) near Main Street, Downtown Eastside, Vancouver

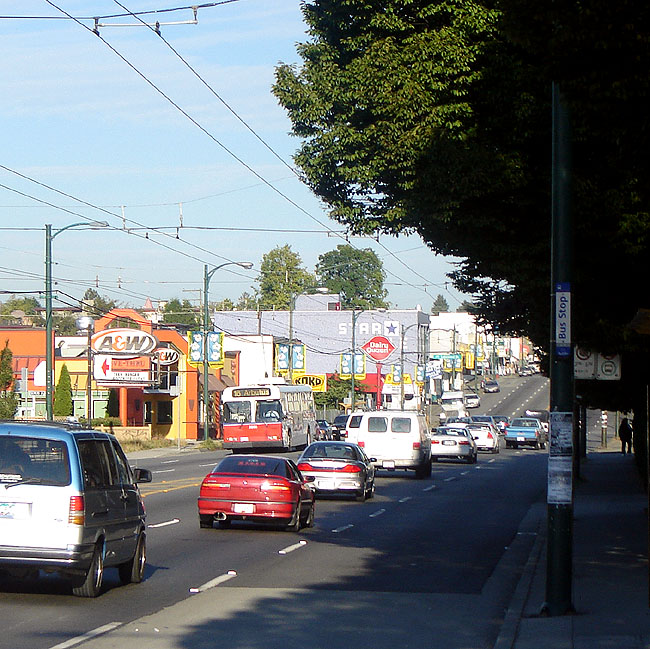
East Hastings Street, Vancouver. Looking east from Victoria Drive.

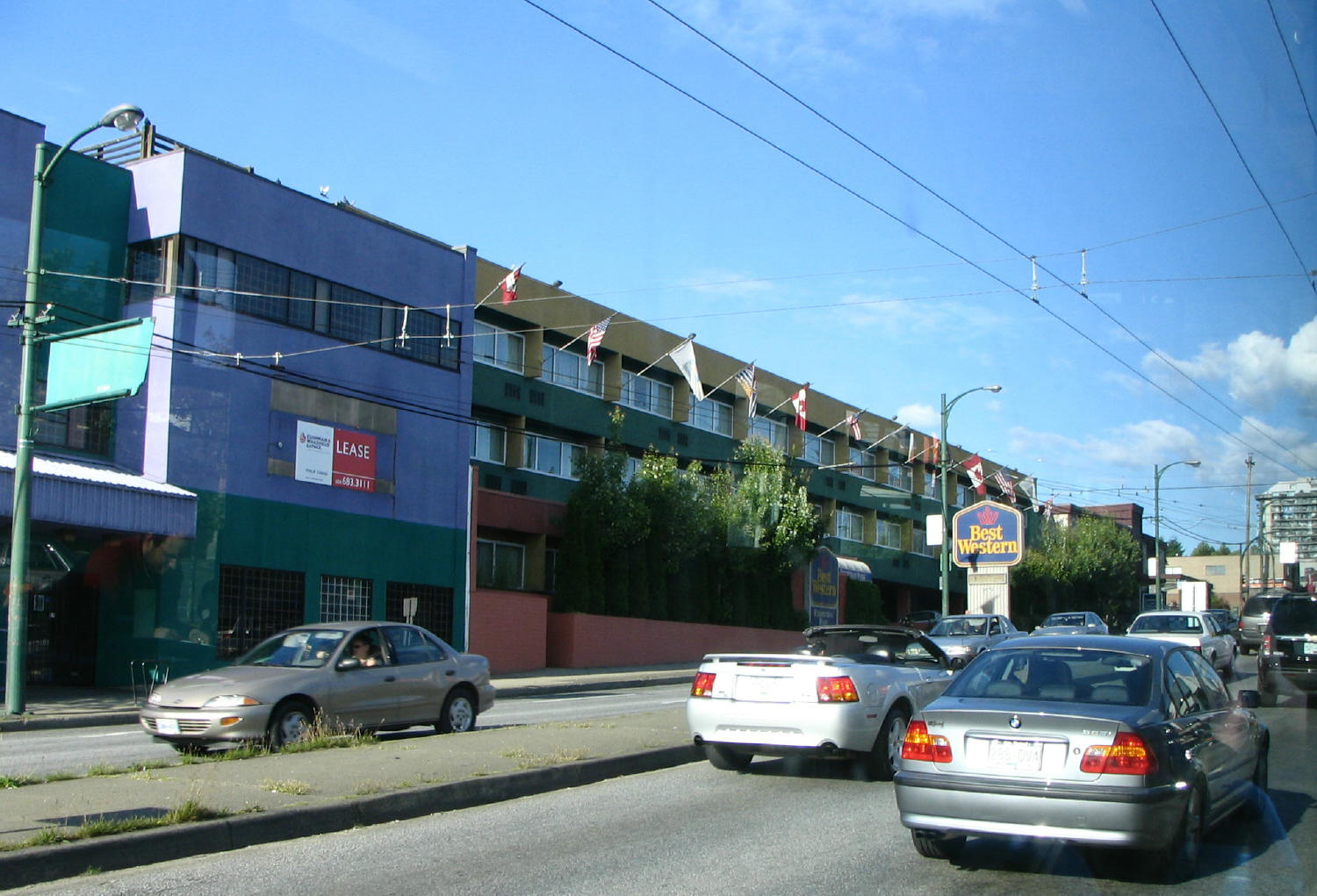
East Hastings Street in East Vancouver, between Cassiar St. and Skeena St.

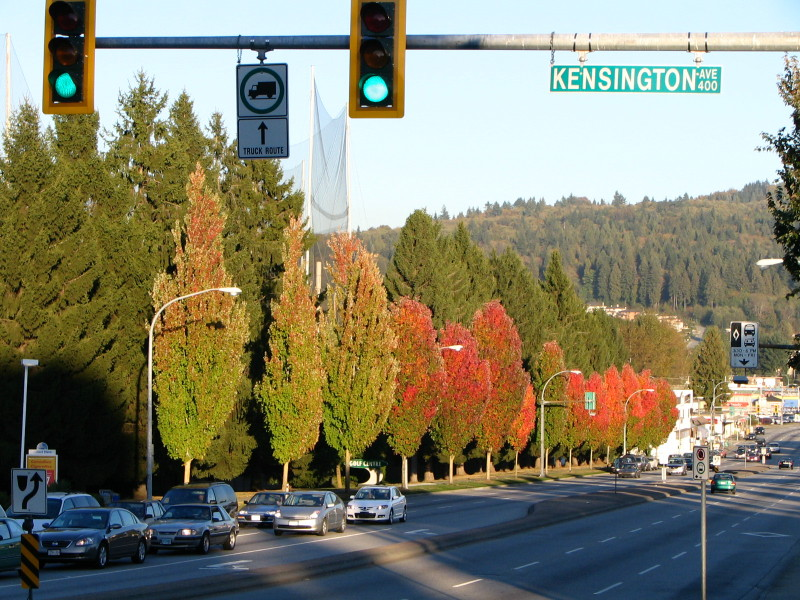
Hastings Street in Lochdale, North Burnaby; Westridge in background.

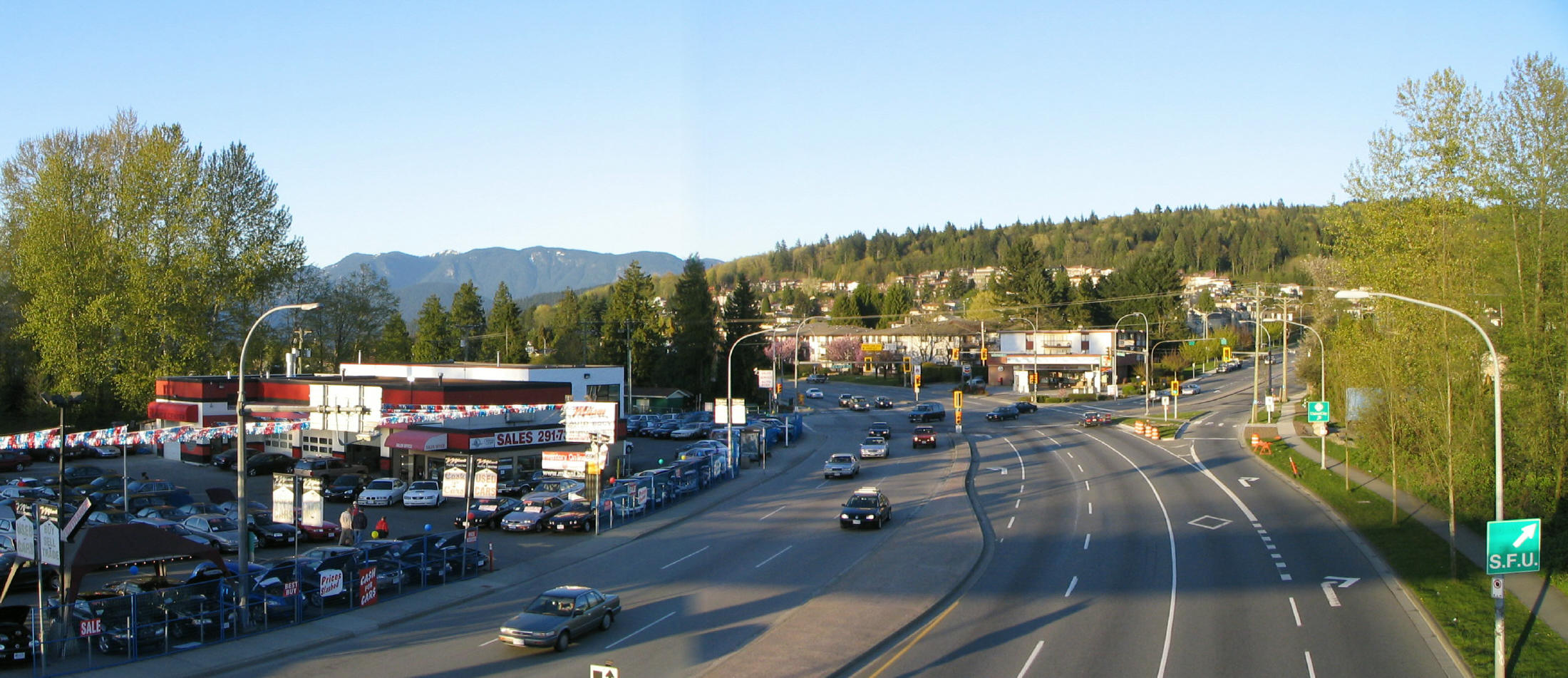
Hastings Street joins Inlet Drive (on the left) while continuing uphill towards Simon Fraser University. Eagle Ridge and Westridge in the distance.

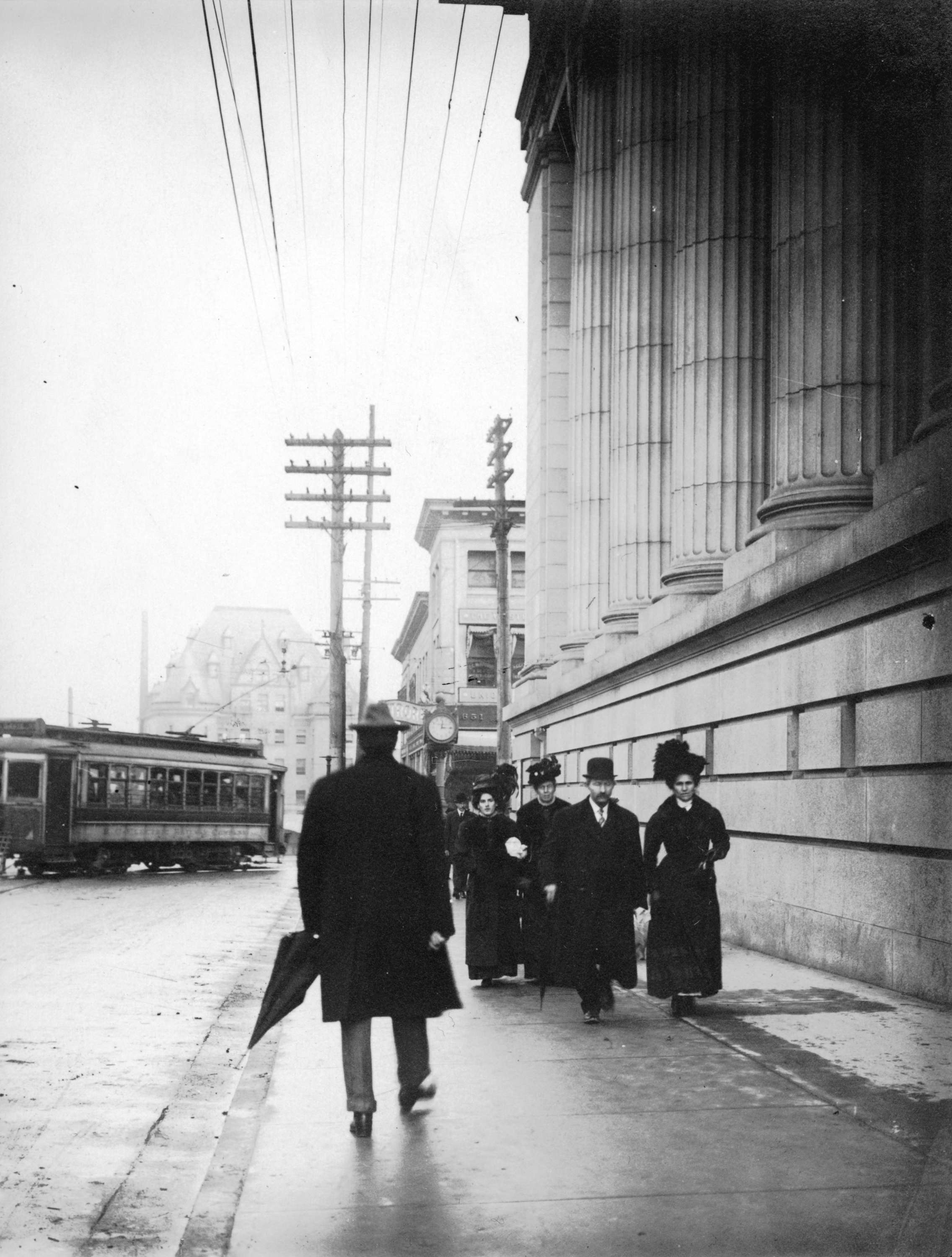
Hastings and Granville, Vancouver, featuring a streetcar and folk in formal wear, circa 1905

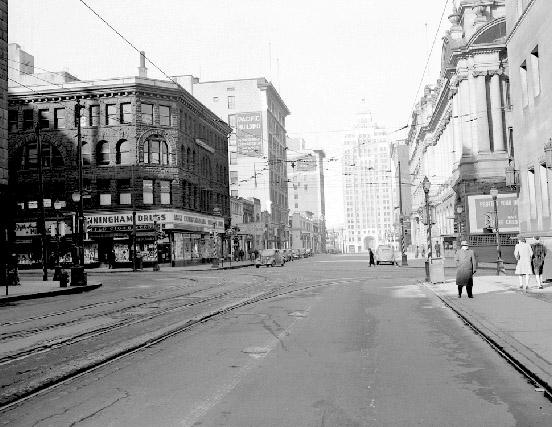
Looking northwest towards the Marine Building from Granville Street, circa 1945.

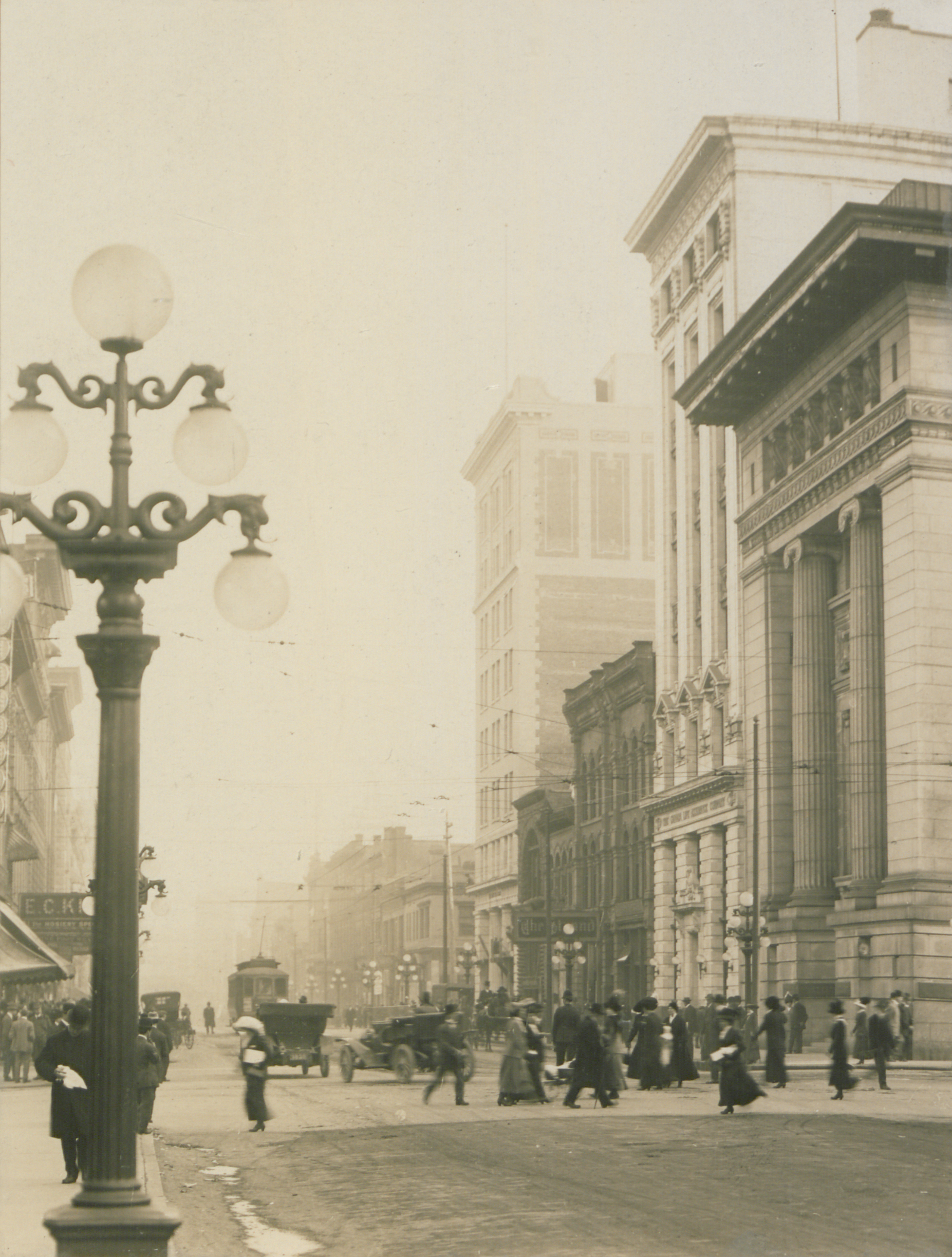
West Hastings, looking eastward from the corner of Granville Street, circa 1911

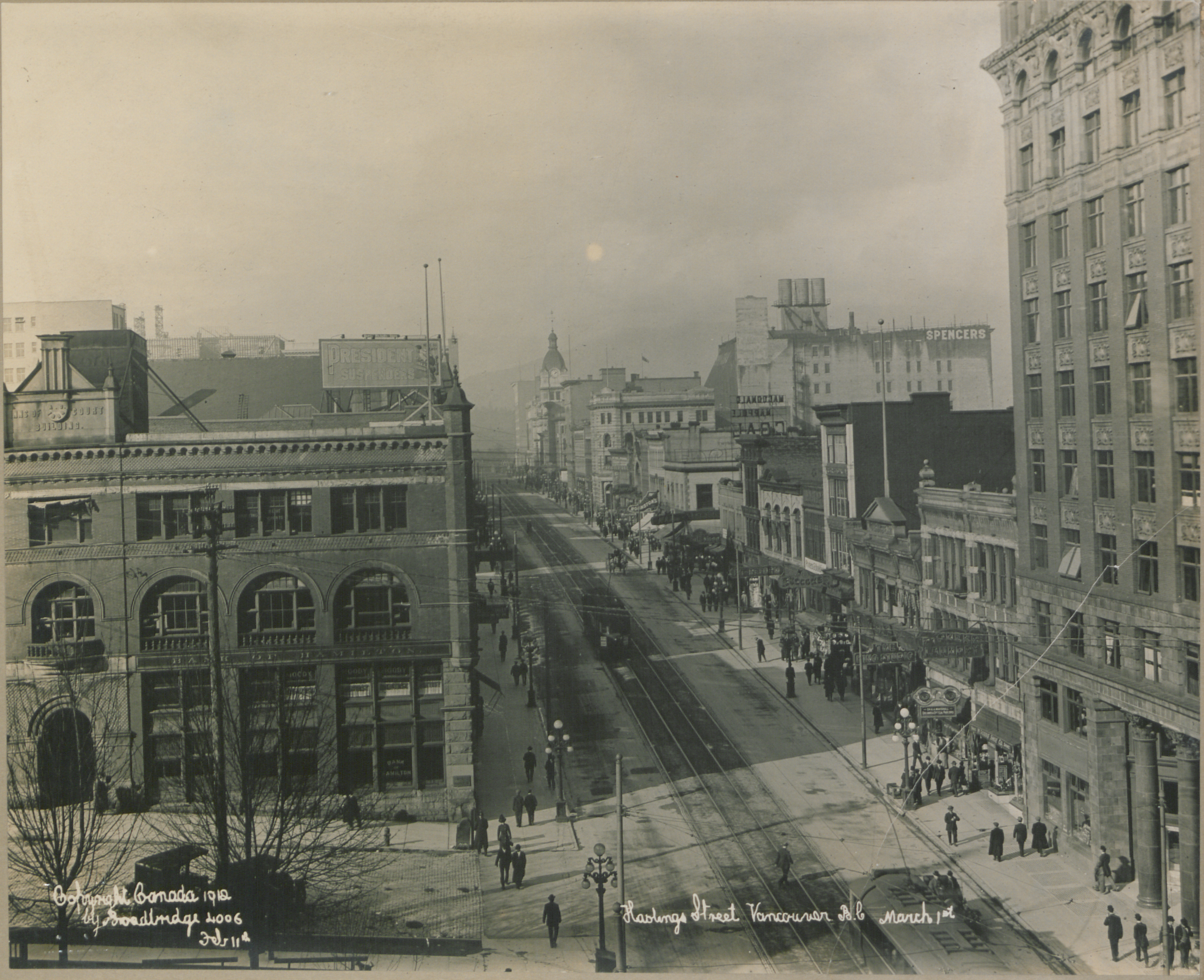
View looking westward from Cambie Street. Probably taken from an upper floor or the roof of the Carter-Cotton Building. March 1, 1912. The Dominion Building is on the right-hand side of the frame.

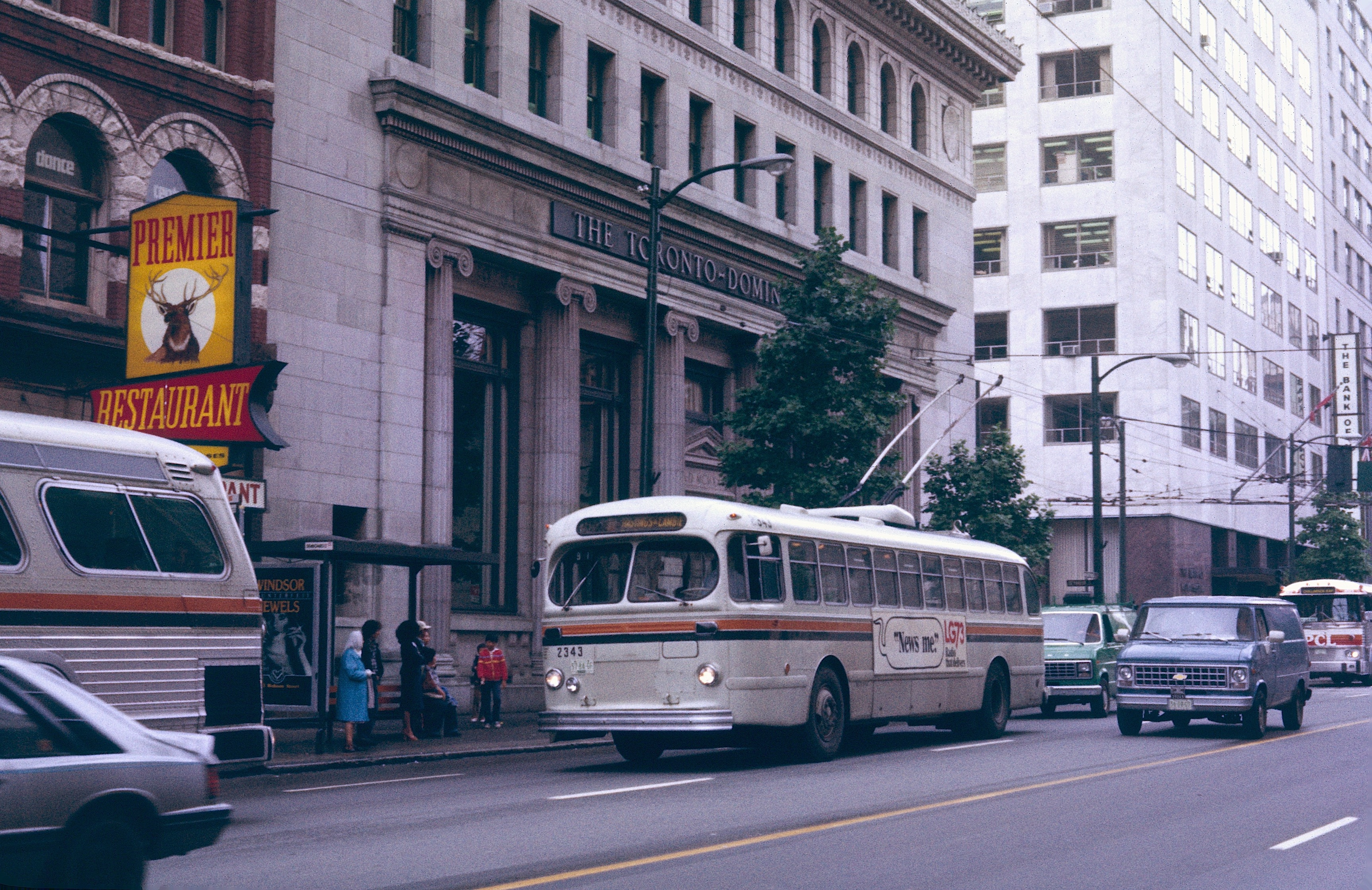
A trolley bus on Hastings Street in downtown in 1981
