= Marpole Bridge =

CP Bridge
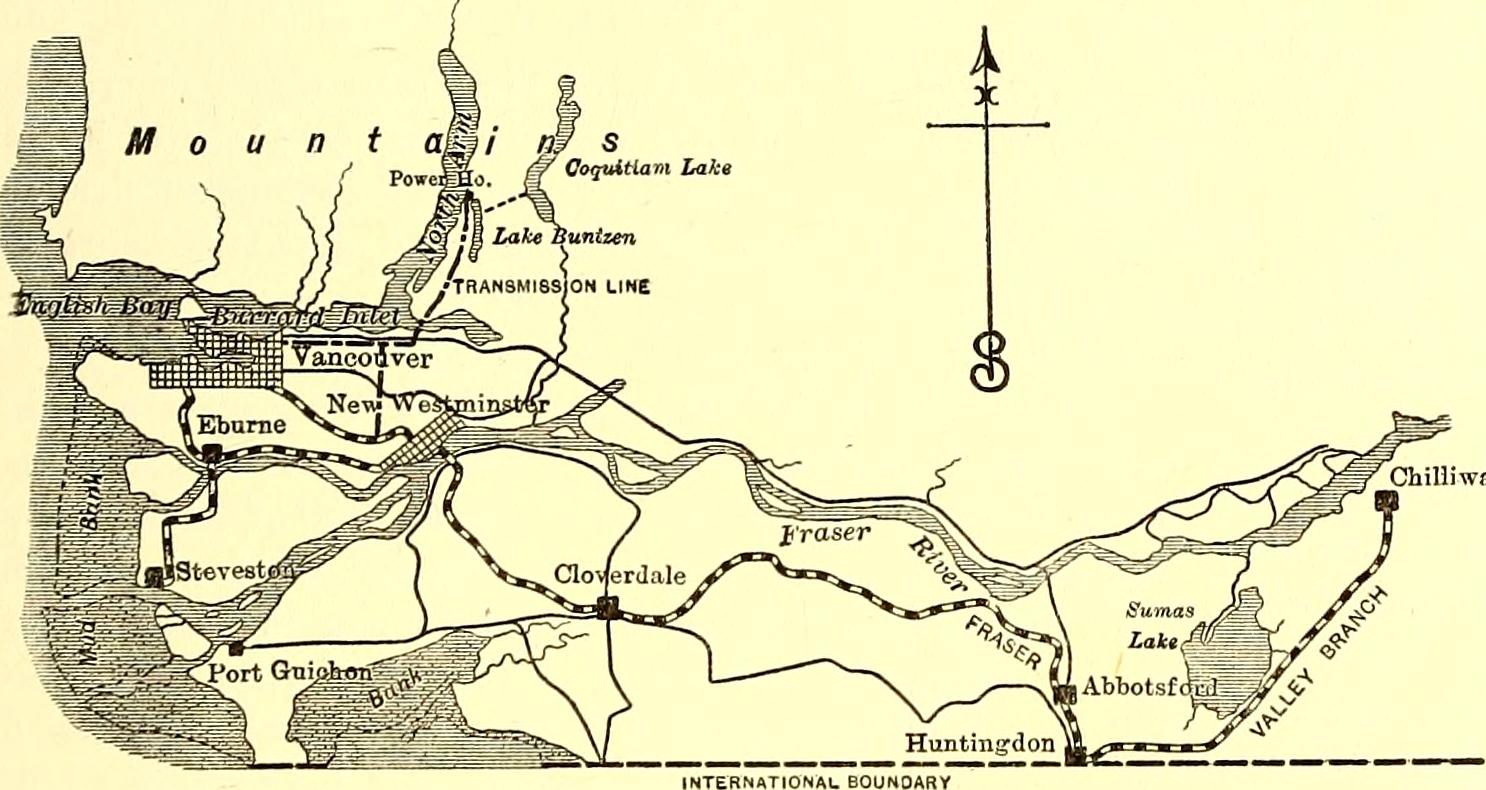
- BCER system map
- Coordinates: 49°11′57″N 123°7′36″W
- Carries: 1 railway track
- Crosses: Fraser River north arm
- Locale: Marpole–Richmond
- Maintained by: Canadian Pacific Railway

Characteristics
- Design: Swing bridge

Rail characteristics
- Track gauge: 4 ft 8 1/2 in (1,435 mm) (standard gauge)
- Electrified: Yes

Location
- Interactive map of CP Bridge

The Marpole CP Rail Bridge was a partially dismantled crossing over the north arm of the Fraser River, and River Drive, in Metro Vancouver.

== History ==
The Marpole road bridge was a nearby sequence of separate structures dating from 1889.

=== Early CP operation ===
Once the Vancouver & Lulu Island Railway, controlled by the Canadian Pacific Railway (CPR), completed the rail bridge in May 1902, work trains carried the steel rails over the river to lay track on Lulu Island. The route proceeded due south from the bridge along today's Garden City Rd. and west along Granville Ave., before south on Railway Ave. The steel swing span railway bridge linked north Eburne with Richmond, and the then important community, port and canneries at Steveston. Created primarily to serve the canneries, the line was not the anticipated commercial success, because the companies preferred shipping directly by sea. Using steam locomotives, the twice daily Vancouver–Steveston mixed trains began that year, but the CP enthusiasm for electrification indicated a desire to off-load the service.

=== BCER operation ===
In 1905, the British Columbia Electric Railway (BCER) leased and electrified the line, as it later would with a new branch to New Westminster. The respective interurbans operated Vancouver–Marpole (formerly Eburne) (1905–52), Marpole–Steveston (1905–58), and Marpole–New Westminster (1909–56). During the early years, the Steveston tram ran hourly. Freight largely comprised smaller loads of way freight. By 1921, spurs to several customers existed near the northern and southern bridge approaches.

Owing to the proximity of several bridges on the Fraser, the unique signal for opening the then called British Columbia Electric Bridge on the North Arm, was four long and two short blasts on the vessel's horn.

By the end of passenger service in 1958, freight comprised boxcar loads, such as fish oil, often hauled by electric locomotives, soon to become an all-diesel fleet on the removal of the overhead power wire. BC Hydro, the successor (1962) to BCER, changed the route in 1965. At the southern bridge approach, the freight track now paralleled the Fraser westward, at a distance of up to 230 metres (755 ft) from the shoreline, before continuing south to join at the Granville/Railway junction. This catered to the Brighouse Industrial Estate, and the Van Horne Industrial Estate surrounding the foot of the bridge. That year, bridge maintenance comprised the renewal of four protection piers and work on the southern approach trestle. In 1967, when a barge carrying wood chips struck a steel support, the 32.3-metre (106 ft) swing span collapsed into the river.

Abandoned, the original north Richmond route was sold to the municipality. Any remaining track was buried on the raising of arterial roads for flood protection. In decline for decades, Steveston freight handling ceased in the 1970s, which effectively ended all traffic to points west of No. 2 Rd. In 1986, BCER relinquished its lease on the track.

=== Later CP operation ===
In 1992, the railway crossing was lifted during the No. 2 Road Bridge construction. By this time, apart from those No. 2 Rd–Steveston sections already sold, such as the Lynas Lane city works yard, the remaining track was largely overgrown with dense bramble and 6-metre (20 ft) high birch. A few years later, this track was lifted.

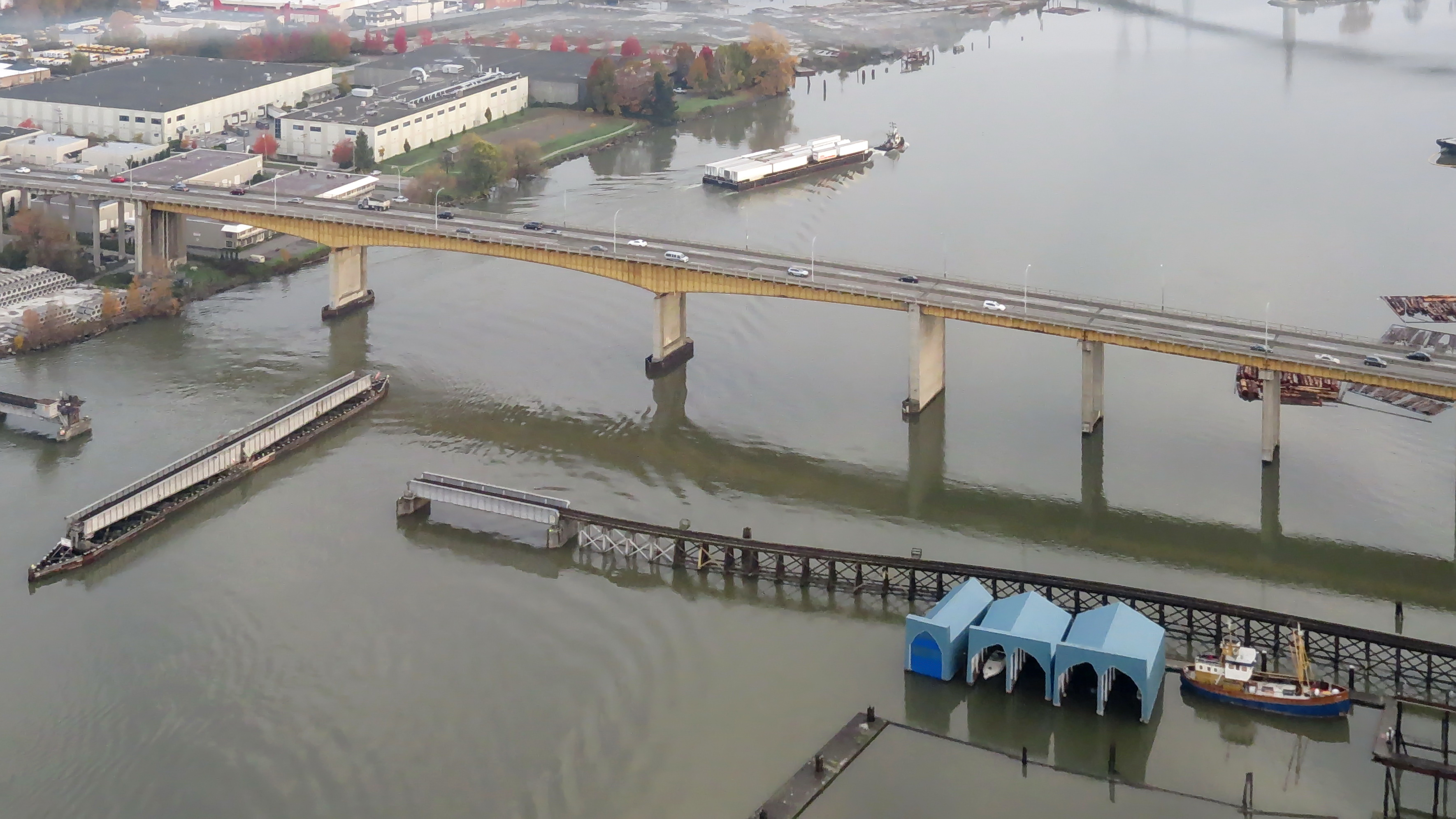
Northeastward, CP Rail Bridge in foreground, Oak St. Bridge in background

By 2002, the only active spur south of Cambie Rd. was Canadian Firelog beside No. 2 Rd., but Ebco Industries (7851 Alderbridge Way) experienced limited use. By 2007, the two major customer spurs were Univar (River Dr./Van Horne Way), and Fraser River Terminals (opposite on River Dr.). Columbia Foam (9500 Van Horne Way) received infrequent service.

In 2006, the city purchased the No. 2 Rd–Capstan Way section, allowing CP use to Gilbert Rd. until 2010, but immediately ended service to Canadian Firelog. In realigning River Rd. and developing the Richmond Olympic Oval site, the track southwest of Hollybridge Way was lifted. That year, the Canada Line Operations and Maintenance Centre site was prepared. This involved the demolition of several warehouses, and the rerouting of CP tracks between the southern approaches for the CP Rail and North Arm SkyTrain bridges.

In 2010, the city purchased the Railway Ave. stretch, which opened exclusively as a greenway in 2013, quashing any prospects of restoring light rail.

In 2014, the track southwest of the bridge, unused at least since 2010, was lifted along the long curve passing beneath the Canada Line, and for the remainder southwest of the Richmond Marina. That year, a hot and fast fire, possibly started by vandals, destroyed a 100-metre (330 ft) section of the creosote-treated wooden trestle approach on the Marpole side. The thick smoke temporarily closed the Oak Street Bridge, and impacted Vancouver International Airport flights. In failing to repair the structure, CP violated its obligations of providing a weekly service to Univar, one of the country’s biggest chemical distributors, isolated by the incident.

In 2016, the right-of-way north of Marpole, inactive for over a decade, was sold to become the Arbutus Greenway. After a barge collision that year, CP removed the swing span within days, and its platform in 2017. The track west of the Ontario St. yard appears unused.

On June 20, 2024, a fire broke out at a nearby industrial building, which spread to the south end side of the bridge. The fire was more intense than the one in 2014, forcing local authorities to close the Oak Street Bridge.

== See also ==
- List of crossings of the Fraser River
- List of BC bridges
