= List of crossings of the Fraser River =

This is a list of bridges, tunnels, and other crossings of the Fraser River in the Canadian province of British Columbia. It includes both functional crossings and historic crossings which no longer exist, and lists them in sequence from the South Arm of the Fraser River at the Strait of Georgia upstream to its source. Listed separately on this page are the crossings on the Fraser River's North and Middle Arms.

== Fraser River Delta (Strait of Georgia to New Westminster) ==
=== South Arm ===
This is a list of crossings of the South Arm of the Fraser River from the Strait of Georgia to the North Arm of the Fraser River at approximately mile 16.5. The South Arm is the primary outflow branch of the Fraser River.

Crossing	Image	Carries	Location	Coordinates	Completed	Notes
Westham Island Bridge		Westham Island Road	Delta and Westham Island	49°04′50″N 123°07′44″W	1910	One of the few remaining Howe truss bridges in the world.
Ladner Ferry (1913–1959)		Passengers and vehicles	Delta and Richmond	49°07′03″N 123°05′12″W	1914	Replaced by George Massey Tunnel in 1959.
George Massey Tunnel		Highway 99	Delta and Richmond	49°07′19″N 123°04′32″W	1959	The only vehicular tunnel crossing of the Fraser River.
Alex Fraser Bridge		Highway 91	Annacis Island and Delta	49°09′36″N 122°56′35″W	1986	
Annacis Island Swing Bridge		Derwent Way	Annacis Island and New Westminster	49°11′11″N 122°55′57″W	1986	

=== Middle Arm ===
This is a list of crossings of the Middle Arm of the Fraser River from the Strait of Georgia to the North Arm of the Fraser River at approximately mile 4.6.

Crossing	Image	Carries	Location	Coordinates	Completed	Notes
No. 2 Road Bridge		No. 2 Road / Russ Baker Way	Richmond and Sea Island	49°10′34.74″N 123°9′25.03″W	1993	
Dinsmore Bridge		Gilbert Road	Richmond and Sea Island	49°10′44″N 123°08′56″W	1969	Weight restrictions were added in October 2006.
Moray Bridge		Sea Island Way	Richmond and Sea Island	49°11′31″N 123°08′13″W	1957	a.k.a. the Moray Channel Bridge, and formerly the Middle Arm Bridge
Sea Island Connector		Bridgeport Road	Richmond and Sea Island	49°11′33″N 123°08′12″W	2002	a.k.a. the Airport Connector Bridge
Middle Arm Canada Line Bridge		SkyTrain Canada Line	Richmond and Sea Island	49°11′45″N 123°08′06″W	2009	a.k.a. Middle Arm or Airport SkyTrain Bridge
Marpole Bridge (1889–1957)		Hudson Street / Woodward Highway	Richmond and Sea Island	49°11′47″N 123°08′05″W	1889	a.k.a. Eburne Bridge, North Arm Bridge, or Sea Island Bridge

=== North Arm ===
This is a list of crossings of the North Arm of the Fraser River from the Strait of Georgia to the main body of the Fraser River at approximately mile 16.5. The North Arm is the secondary outflow branch of the Fraser River.

Crossing	Image	Carries	Location	Coordinates	Completed	Notes
Marpole Bridge (1889–1957)		Hudson Street / Woodward Highway	Sea Island and Vancouver	49°11′57″N 123°08′09″W	1889	a.k.a. Eburne Bridge, Sea Island Bridge, or Middle Arm Bridge
Arthur Laing Bridge		Grant McConachie Way	Sea Island and Vancouver	49°11′57″N 123°08′09″W	1975	
Marpole CP Rail Bridge		CP Railway (low-level in foreground)	Richmond and Vancouver	49°11′59″N 123°07′37″W	1902; Span rebuilt 1967	Swing span removed following barge collision in 2016.
Oak Street Bridge		Highway 99	Richmond and Vancouver	49°11′59″N 123°07′32″W	1957	
North Arm Canada Line Bridge		SkyTrain Canada Line cyclists and pedestrians	Richmond and Vancouver	49°12′09″N 123°6′57″W	2009	a.k.a. Canada Line Bridge (Richmond-Vancouver), or various identifying descriptives
Fraser Street Bridge (1894–1974)		Fraser Street / No. 5 Road	Richmond and Vancouver	49°11′53″N 123°05′28″W	1894	a.k.a. Fraser Ave. Bridge, North Arm Bridge, No. 5 Rd. Bridge, or Twigg Island Bridge
Knight Street Bridge		Knight Street	Richmond and Vancouver	49°12′08″N 123°04′39″W	1974	
CNR Bridge		Canadian National Railway	Burnaby and Richmond	49°10′59″N 122°59′17″W	1931	
Queensborough Bridge		Highway 91A	New Westminster and Queensborough	49°11′46″N 122°56′49″W	1960	
Queensborough Railway Bridge		SRY Rail Link	New Westminster and Queensborough	49°11′50″N 122°55′24″W	1910	
Q to Q Ferry		Passengers	New Westminster and Queensborough	49°11′45″N 122°55′1″W	2017	

== Main Watercourse (New Westminster to Yellowhead Pass) ==
Crossing	Image	Carries	Location	Coordinates	Completed	Notes
SkyBridge		SkyTrain Expo Line	New Westminster and Surrey	49°12′20″N 122°53′48″W	1990	Until 2019 it was the longest cable-supported transit-only bridge in the world.
Pattullo Bridge		Highway 1A; Highway 99A	New Westminster and Surrey	49°12′27″N 122°53′40″W	1937	Replaced by Riverview Bridge in 2026.
New Westminster Bridge		Railway	New Westminster and Surrey	49°12′29″N 122°53′38″W	1904	Oldest bridge in the Lower Mainland of British Columbia. Served automobile traffic from 1904 to 1937.
stal̕əw̓asəm Bridge		Highway 1A; Highway 99A	New Westminster and Surrey	49°12′29″N 122°53′33″W	2026	
Port Mann Bridge		Highway 1 (TCH)	Coquitlam and Surrey	49°13′14″N 122°48′45″W	1964 (original); 2012 (current)	
Barnston Island Ferry		Passengers and vehicles	Barnston Island and Surrey	49°11′31″N 122°43′30″W	1916	
Golden Ears Bridge		Golden Ears Way	Langley and Maple Ridge	49°11′47″N 122°39′56″W (Approx)	2009	Longest extradosed bridge in the Western Hemisphere.
Jacob Haldi Bridge		Glover Road	Langley and McMillan Island	49°10′18″N 122°34′34″W	1932 (original); 1994 (current)	
Albion Ferry (1957–2009)		Passengers and Vehicles	Langley and Maple Ridge	49°10′52″N 122°33′50″W	1957	Replaced by Golden Ears Bridge in 2009.
Mission Bridge		Highway 11	Abbotsford and Mission	49°07′25″N 122°18′21″W	1973	
Mission Railway Bridge		CPR	Abbotsford and Mission	49°07′34″N 122°18′02″W	1909	Served automobile traffic from 1909 to 1972.
Agassiz-Rosedale Bridge		Highway 9	South of Agassiz	49°12′22″N 121°46′37″W	1956	
Water Avenue Bridge		Highway 1 (TCH)	Haig and Hope	49°23′10″N 121°27′08″W	1916	
Alexandra Bridge (1964)		Highway 1 (TCH)	Alexandra Lodge-Spuzzum	49°42′06″N 121°24′36″W	1964	
Alexandra Bridge (1926)		Cariboo Road (not in use, heritage site); Pedestrians	Alexandra Lodge-Spuzzum	49°42′27″N 121°25′00″W	1926	The original crossing was built by Joseph Trutch in 1861 and was completely rebuilt in 1863 and 1926. It was later replaced by the modern Alexandra Bridge in 1964.
Hells Gate Suspension Bridge		Pedestrians	Hells Gate	49°46′48″N 121°26′49″W	1948	Original suspension bridge was destroyed in May 1948 due to a localized flood event. The new bridge was built 3 metres higher than the original.
Hells Gate Airtram		Passengers	Hells Gate	49°46′50″N 121°26′59″W	1970	
North Bend Aerial Ferry (1940–1986)		Passengers and vehicles	Boston Bar and North Bend	49°52′37″N 121°26′37″W	1940	Replaced by Cog Harrington Bridge in 1986. The aerial tramway is unique given that it transported passengers and automobiles across the Fraser River.
Cog Harrington Bridge		Chaumox Road	Boston Bar and North Bend	49°52′37″N 121°26′37″W	1986	
Siska CPR Bridge		Canadian Pacific Railway	Siska	50°08′55″N 121°34′42″W	1883	The original truss span was replaced in 1910.
Siska CNR Bridge		Canadian National Railway	Siska	50°09′05″N 121°34′52″W	1914	
Lytton CNR Fraser Bridge		Canadian National Railway and pedestrians	Lytton	50°13′27″N 121°35′06″W	1914	
Lytton Ferry		Passengers and vehicles	Lytton	50°14′51″N 121°35′30″W	1940	
Fraser River Suspension Bridge		Pedestrians	North of Lytton	50°16′59″N 121°37′23″W	1997	
Lillooet PGE Bridge (1915–1948)		Pacific Great Eastern Railway	Lillooet	50°40′48″N 121°55′25″W	1915	Demolished in 1948.
Bridge of the Twenty-Three Camels		Highway 99	Lillooet	50°41′02″N 121°55′44″W	1981	
Lillooet ferries (c.1859–c.1891)		Old Cariboo Road	Lillooet	50°42′40″N 121°54′41″W	c.1859	Superseded by Lillooet truss bridge in 1889.
Lillooet Suspension Bridge		Old Highway 12 (not in use); Pedestrians	Lillooet	50°42′41″N 121°54′41″W	1913	Replaced by the Bridge of the Twenty-Three Camels in 1981. Restored as a pedestrian-only crossing in 2003.
Lillooet PGE Bridge (second)		Pacific Great Eastern Railway but Canadian National Railway since 2004	Lillooet	50°43′04″N 121°54′50″W	1931	
Bridge River Bridge (1858–c.1870s)		Old Cariboo Road	Lillooet	50°45′02″N 121°55′51″W	1858	The bridge was in use until the 1870s.
Pavilion Ferry (1897–c.1964)		Passengers	northwest of Pavilion	50°52′58″N 121°51′45″W	1897	
Big Bar Ferry		Unnumbered Ranch Road	Big Bar Creek (Kostering)	51°11′00″N 122°07′59″W		Reaction-cable ferry (year-round)
Dog Creek Bridge		Unnumbered Ranch Road	Gang Ranch-Dog Creek	51°31′39″N 122°17′05″W		
Sheep Creek Bridge		Highway 20	Riske Creek (18 km SW of Williams Lake	51°59′02″N 122°16′32″W		
Chimney Creek Bridge			Chimney Creek Indian Reserve No. 5 (NW of Williams Lake	52°04′00″N 122°16′00″W		
Rudy Johnson Bridge		Buckskin Road	Near Soda Creek	52°15′37″N 122°15′51″W	1968	
Marguerite Ferry (1917–2002)		Passengers and vehicles	Castle Rock and Marguerite	52°31′47″N 122°26′43″W	1917	
Fort Alexandria Ferry (1821–1895)		Passengers	Fort Alexandria	52°33′45″N 122°28′33″W	1821	
Alexandria Ferry (1913–1950)		Passengers and vehicles	Alexandria	52°39′00″N 122°29′32″W	1913	
Moffat Bridge		Moffat Bridge Approach/Marsh Drive	Quesnel	52°58′29″N 122°30′00″W		
Quesnel Fraser River Foot Bridge		Pedestrians	Quesnel	52°58′32″N 122°30′01″W	1929	Resurfaced for pedestrian use in 1974.
Simon Fraser Bridge		Highway 97	Prince George	53°53′25″N 122°44′52″W	1963 (southbound); 2009 (northbound)	
Yellowhead Bridge		Highway 16	Prince George	53°54′37″N 122°43′24″W	1988	
Prince George CNR Bridge		Canadian National Railway	Prince George	53°54′49″N 122°43′06″W	1914	
Prince George BCR-CNR Bridge		BC Rail and Canadian National Railway	Prince George	53°54′54″N 122°41′27″W		
Road Bridge		Loopol Road	Near Prince George	53°58′45″N 122°40′33″W		Shelley: Northwood road/rail bridge in "Railway" section, and former ferry upstream in "Roads".
Road Bridge		Upper Fraser Road	Near McGregor	54°04′58″N 121°50′56″W		Hansard: Bridge in "Road Transport" section, and former ferry downstream in "Ferry & Loading Areas".
Hansard CNR Bridge		Canadian National Railway	Near McGregor	54°04′37″N 121°50′55″W		McGregor in first section.
Dome Creek CNR Bridge		Canadian National Railway	Near Dome Creek	53°45′14″N 121°02′42″W		Dome Creek in first section.
Road Bridge		Morkil Forest Service Road	Near Loos	53°35′27″N 120°41′20″W		
Highway Bridge		Highway 16	McBride	53°18′07″N 120°08′24″W		
Road Bridge		Dunster Station Road	Dunster	53°08′35″N 119°50′06″W		
Road Bridge		Blackman Road	Near Tete Jaune Cache	52°58′29″N 119°26′13″W	1953	
Highway Bridge		Highway 5	Near Tete Jaune Cache	52°58′27″N 119°25′30″W		
Railway Bridge		Canadian National Railway	Mount Robson Provincial Park	53°00′03″N 119°03′18″W		
Railway Bridge		Canadian National Railway	Mount Robson Provincial Park	52°59′16″N 119°00′36″W		
Highway Bridge		Highway 16	Mount Robson Provincial Park	52°52′02″N 118°40′24″W		
Highway Bridge		Highway 16	Mount Robson Provincial Park	52°51′10″N 118°36′23″W		

== See also ==
- List of crossings of the Thompson River
- List of crossings of the Nechako River
