= Sea Island Connector =

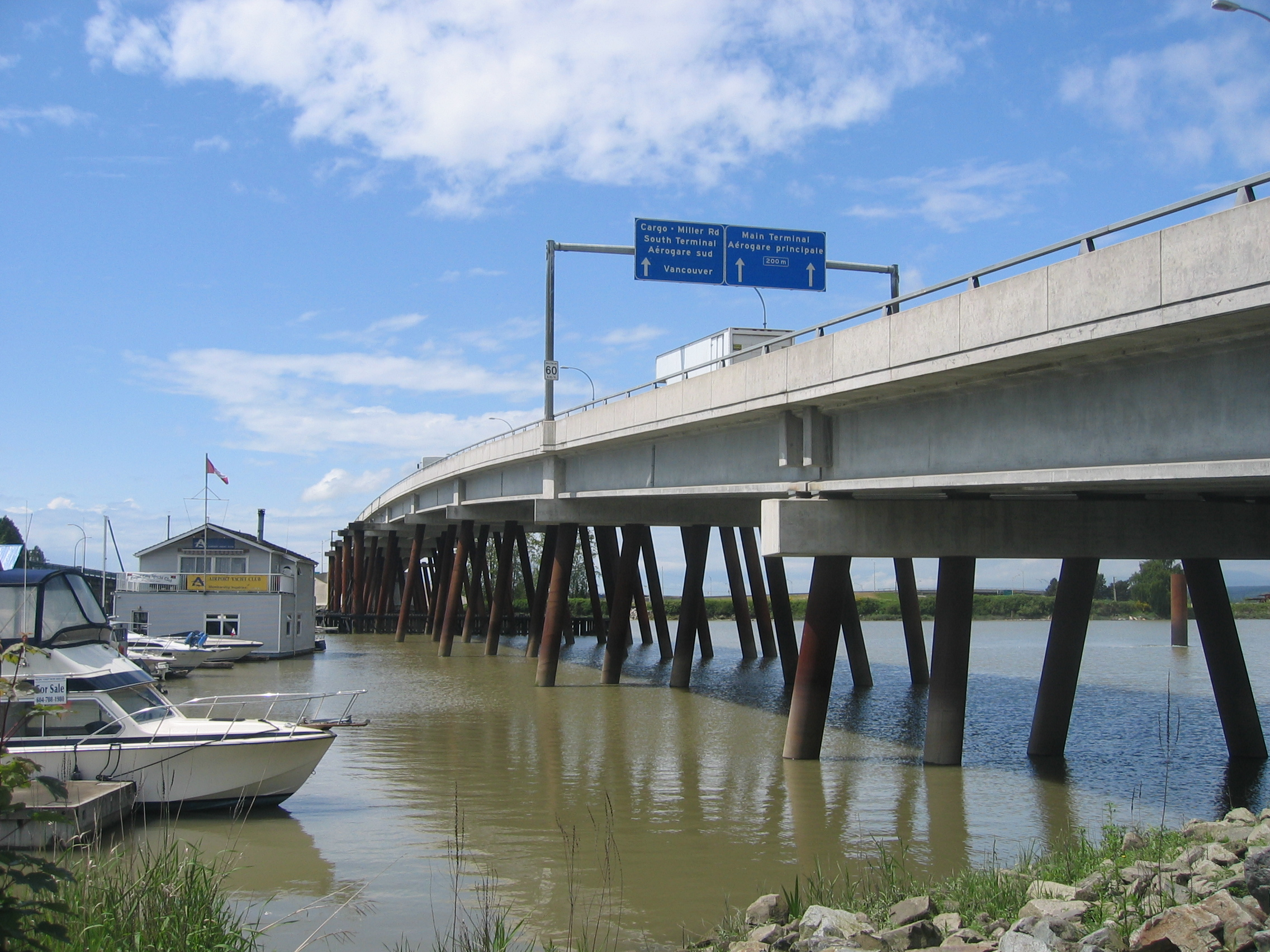
- Coordinates: 49°11′33″N 123°08′12″W
- Carries: Three lanes from Bridgeport Road
- Crosses: Middle Arm Fraser River
- Locale: Richmond, BC
- Maintained by: Province of BC

History
- Opened: August 29, 2001

Location
- Interactive map of Sea Island Connector

The Sea Island Connector, is a crossing over the middle arm of the Fraser River in Metro Vancouver.

== History ==
=== Project ===
Completed in August 2001, the concrete beams, atop the exposed steel piles driven into the river, support the concrete girders. This low-level three-lane bridge, parallel to the Moray Bridge, carries westbound traffic toward the Vancouver International Airport (YVR). The Ministry of Transportation and Infrastructure for BC owns and maintains the structure. However, the joint exercise was a partnership of the Vancouver International Airport Authority, the province, the federal government, and the City of Richmond.

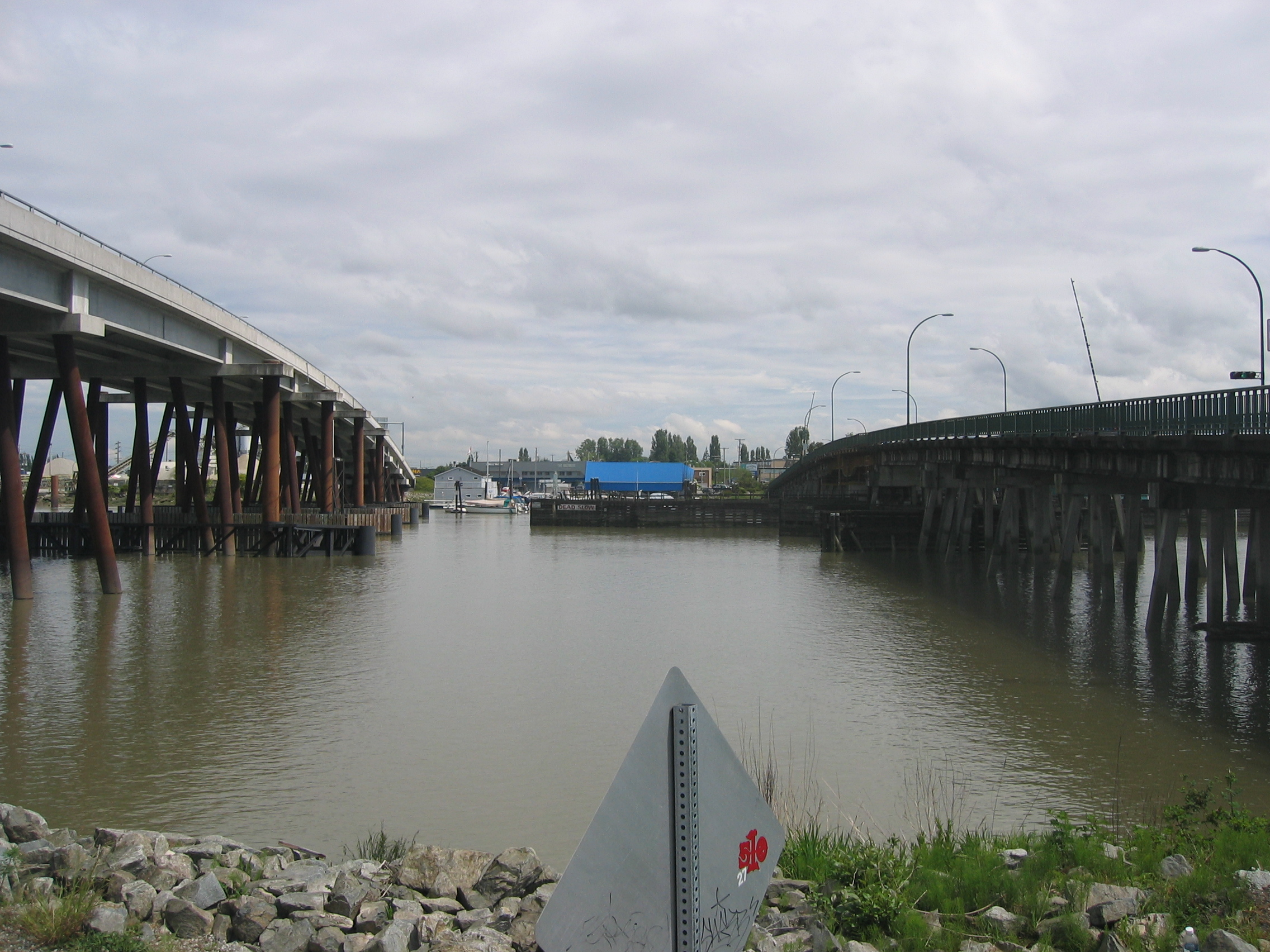
Connector Bridge (left) and Moray Bridge (right).

The $40 million project also comprised a vehicle overpass, interchanges on Sea Island to Grant McConachie Way and Russ Baker Way, and enhancements to Bridgeport Road and the Highway 99 interchange. The collaboration improved YVR access from Richmond and the highway, which includes the Oak Street Bridge.

=== Roadways ===
Formerly, Airport Rd. (north) leading to Grauer Rd., and Cessna Dr., branched at the foot of the Moray Bridge. Airport Rd. (north) became a cul-de-sac. Cessna Dr. access reconfigured to Russ Baker Way.

The Moray Bridge had been a single lane each way, subject to congestion from vehicle accidents, swing span openings for boats, or rush hour. Although commercial vessels largely avoid the middle arm, it is popular with pleasure craft. Yacht masts can clear the new bridge when travelling to the marinas immediately downstream.

During November and December 2019, the consecutive Russ Baker Way overpass experienced lane closures for concrete rehabilitation, better drainage, and bearing replacement.

== See also ==
- List of crossings of the Fraser River
- List of BC bridges
