= Moray Bridge =

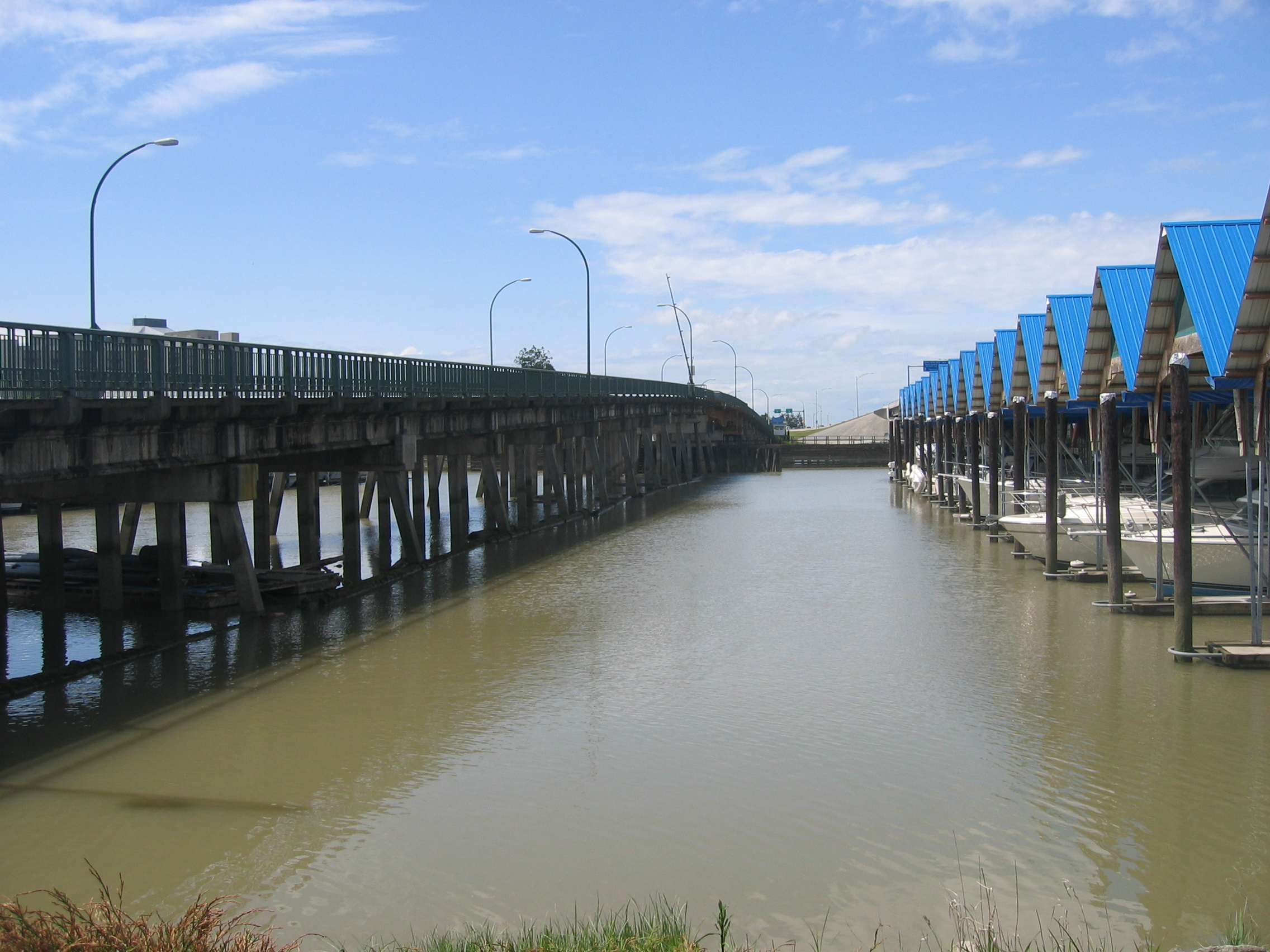
- Coordinates: 49°11′31″N 123°08′13″W
- Carries: Two lanes of Sea Island Way, pedestrians and bicycles
- Crosses: Middle Arm Fraser River
- Locale: Richmond
- Official name: Moray Channel Bridge
- Maintained by: Province of British Columbia

Characteristics
- Design: swing bridge

History
- Opened: 1957

Location
- Interactive map of Moray Bridge

The Moray Bridge, also known as the Moray Channel Bridge, and formerly the Middle Arm Bridge, is a crossing over the middle arm of the Fraser River in Metro Vancouver. Richard Moody, who would name geographical features, such as this channel, after acquaintances, honoured Jonathan Moray (1824–84), a sergeant in the Corps of Royal Engineers, and later the New Westminster police chief.

== History ==
=== Structure ===
Opened in July 1957, the same date as the Oak Street Bridge, these links replaced the Marpole Bridge (road). The new configuration created a more circuitous route between Vancouver and Vancouver International Airport (YVR), not restored until the Arthur Laing Bridge opened in 1975.

The concrete and steel second bridge across the Moray Channel cost about $1m, of which the federal government contributed $400,000. The Ministry of Transportation and Infrastructure for BC owns and maintains this low-level two-lane bridge. The centre swing span is 53 metres, and the approaches are 170 metres on Lulu Island, and 124 metres on Sea Island.

Within a few years of construction, scouring required repairing and surrounding the protection piers with rock. The expansion joints were repaired in 1962–63. Attached to the western approach, the tender house was replaced the following year. This small building houses the human operator of the swing-span controls. In 1980–81, major pier protection was undertaken.

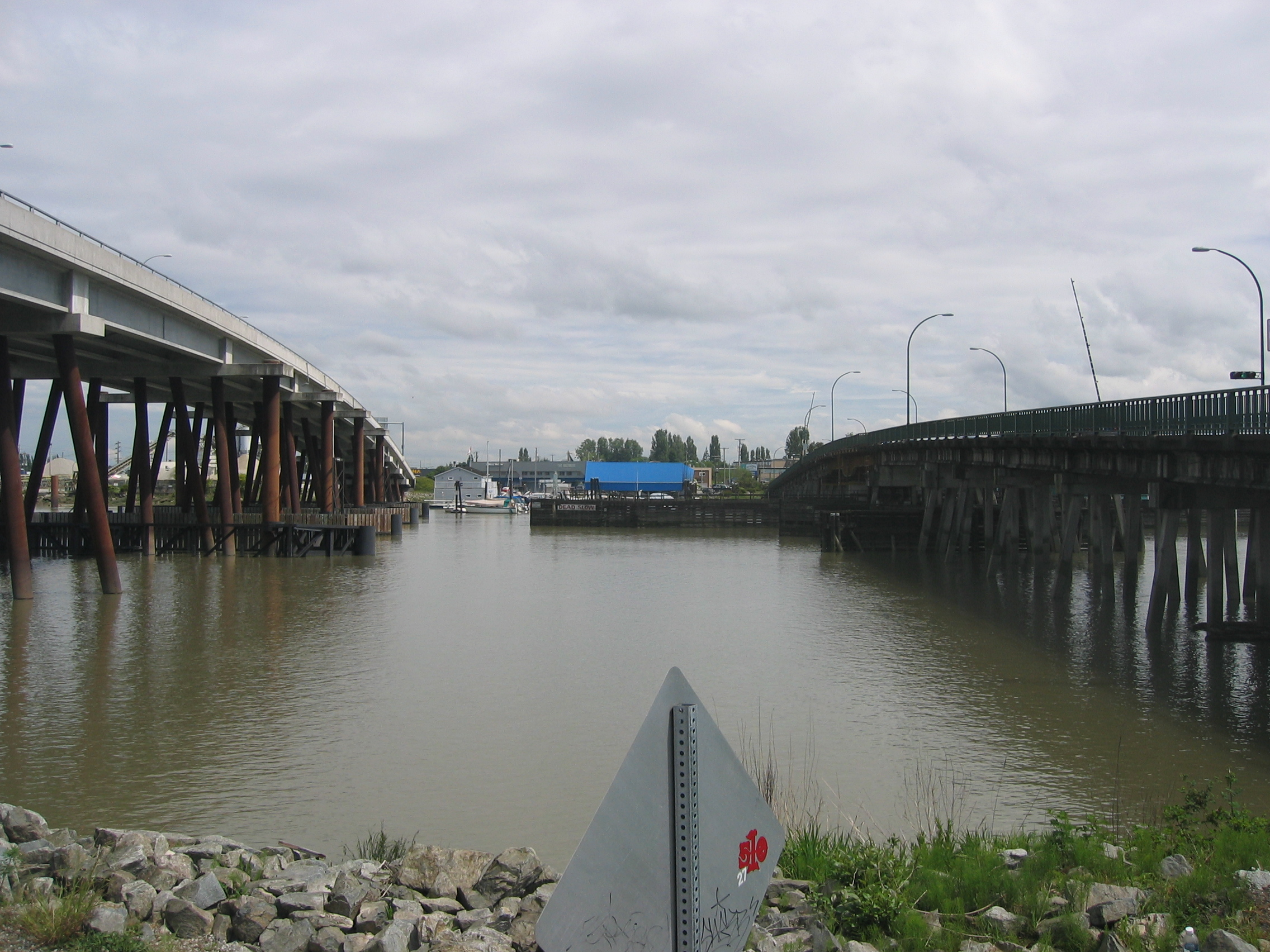
Sea Island Bridge (left) and Moray Bridge (right).

=== Roadways ===
Prior to the 1969 opening of the Dinsmore Bridge, the Moray Bridge was the only crossing in existence. Consequently, when the span malfunctioned, as it did twice in 1961, traffic could be trapped for several hours. The non-arrival of passengers and crew delayed some airport flights. Mechanical and electrical issues continue to plague the span.

The single lane each way, 1957–2001, was subject to traffic congestion from vehicle accidents, swing span openings for boats, or rush hour volumes. Linking Sea Island Way on Lulu Island and Miller Rd on Sea Island, the roadway intersected Airport Rd. On construction in the late 1970s, Russ Baker Way became the new intersection, making Airport Rd. (south) a cul-de-sac. Prior to 2001, Airport Rd. (north) leading to Grauer Rd., and Cessna Dr., branched at the foot of the bridge. Following the 2001 opening of the Sea Island Connector, the Moray Bridge has carried only eastbound traffic from YVR. The only unrestricted vehicle access is from Grant McConachie Way.

== See also ==
- List of crossings of the Fraser River
- List of BC bridges
