= Prince George CNR Bridge =

Bridge in Canada

Coordinates: 53°54′49″N 122°43′06″W

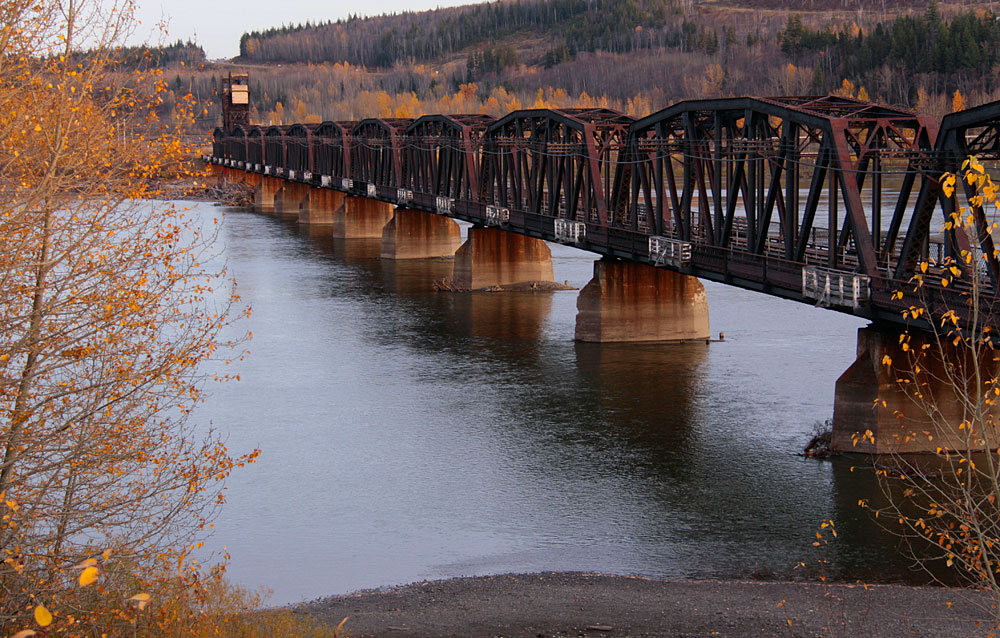
CNR Bridge near Prince George, British Columbia.

The CN Rail Bridge is a truss bridge over the Fraser River. It was built in 1914 by the Grand Trunk Pacific Railway and designed by Joseph Legrand. It is the longest railroad bridge in British Columbia.

The central span is a bascule bridge that could open to allow shipping on the river. It was designed by Joseph Strauss, future engineer of the Golden Gate Bridge. The lift span stopped being used in 1954.

A roadway on each side was used for cars and pedestrians from 1915 to 1987, at which time the concrete Yellowhead Bridge was completed. This makes it historically a road-rail bridge.

Its arrival lead to the founding of the City of Prince George near the fur trading post Fort George (electoral district).

== See also ==
- List of crossings of the Fraser River
- List of bridges in Canada
