= Yellowhead Bridge =

Yellowhead Bridge can refer to one of two bridges in the British Columbia Interior.

- Yellowhead Bridge (Prince George), which carries British Columbia Highway 16 over the Fraser River
- Yellowhead Bridge (Kamloops), which carries British Columbia Highway 5 over the South Thompson River
