= Middle Arm Bridge =

Rapid-transit rail bridge in Vancouver

Coordinates: 49°11′44.5″N 123°8′7.0″W

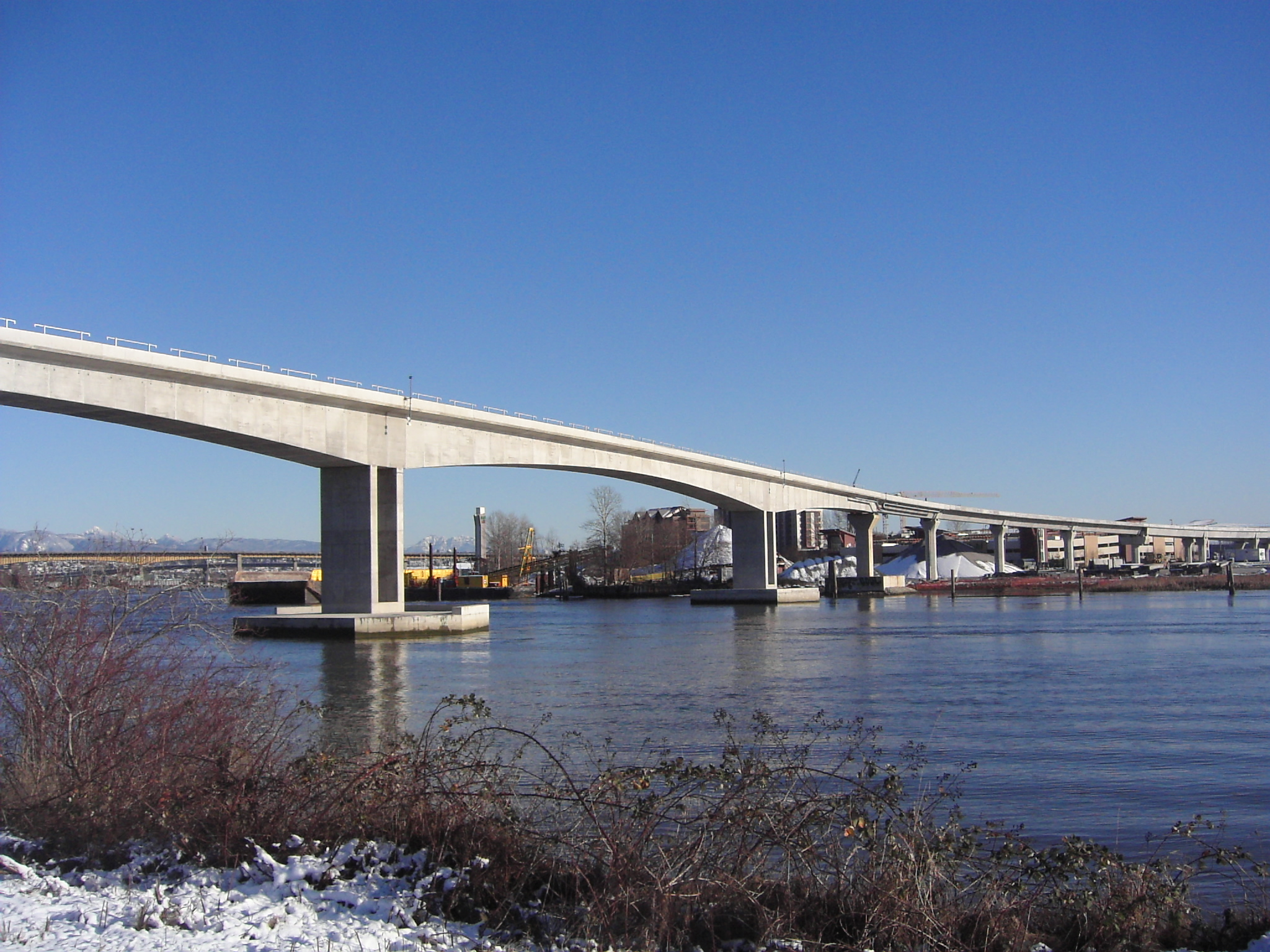
The Middle Arm Bridge.

The Middle Arm Bridge is one of three transit bridges in Metro Vancouver. It spans the middle arm of the Fraser River, linking Lulu Island with the Vancouver International Airport on Sea Island. It is used by the airport branch of the Canada Line, which opened in August 2009.

The bridge is a box girder prestressed concrete bridge, and is built using cost-efficient cantilever construction. The integrated arch form is designed to appear minimal, while adequately supporting the weight of the trains that cross it.

The Moray Bridge, a swing bridge nearby, was also previously referred to as the Middle Arm Bridge.

== See also ==
- List of bridges in Canada
- List of crossings of the Fraser River
