= CNR Bridge =

CNR Lulu Island Bridge
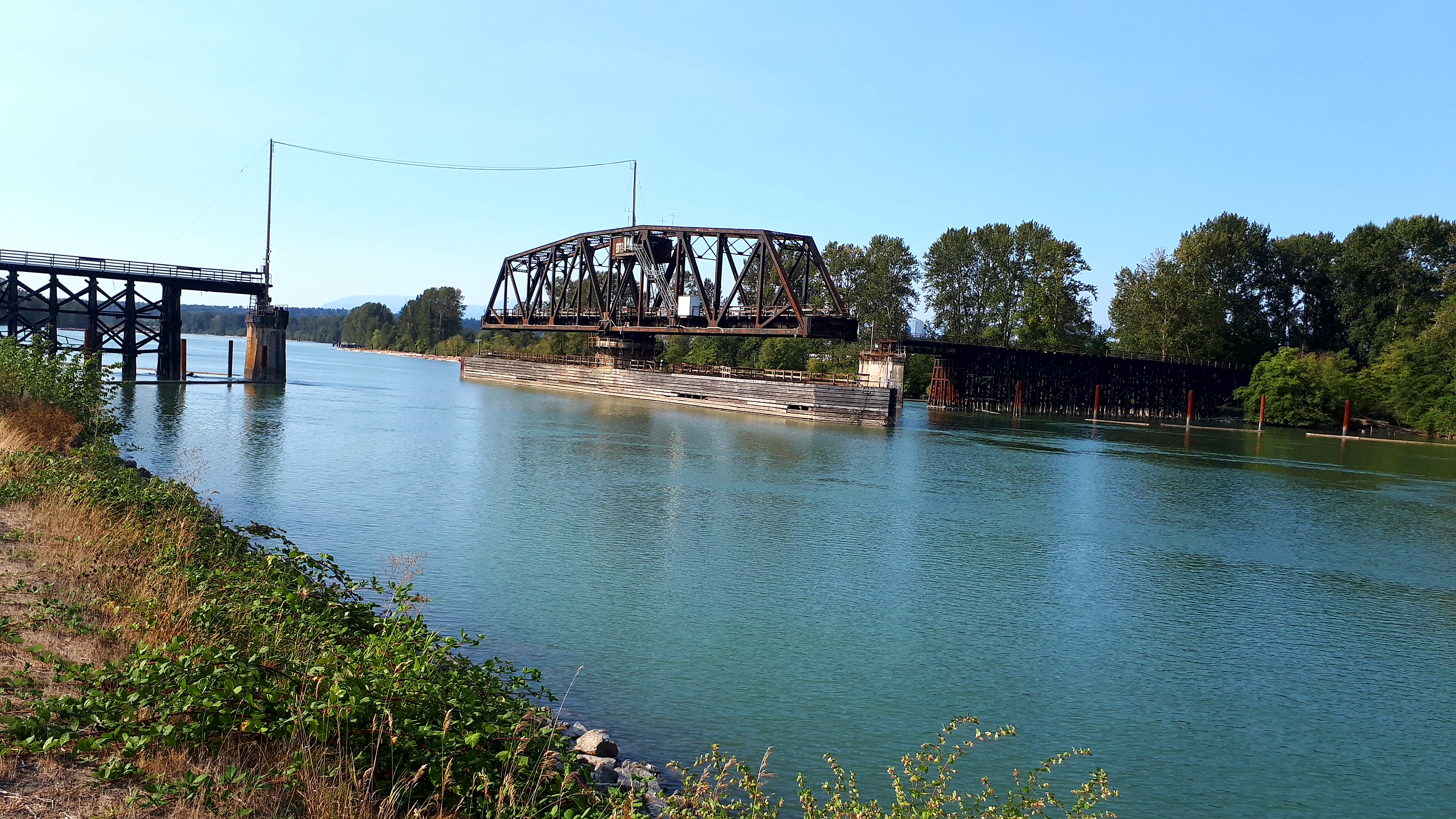
- CNR Bridge pictured in September 2017
- Coordinates: 49.182903°N 122.988113°W
- Carries: 1 railway track
- Crosses: Fraser River north arm
- Locale: Burnaby-Richmond
- Maintained by: Canadian National Railway

Characteristics
- Design: Swing bridge
- Clearance below: 6.6 m (22 ft) open, 21 m (69 ft) closed

Rail characteristics
- Track gauge: 4 ft 8 1/2 in (1,435 mm) (standard gauge)
- Electrified: No

Statistics
- Daily traffic: 4 (as of 2024)

Location
- Interactive map of CNR Lulu Island Bridge

Opened in 1931, the Canadian National Railway (CNR) steel truss swing span railway bridge over the north arm of the Fraser River in Metro Vancouver links Burnaby with Richmond and the south arm Vancouver Fraser Port Authority facilities on Lulu Island.

The Canadian Northern Railway (CNoR) had planned to lay track from the north end of the New Westminster Bridge and cross the Fraser at the 1931 location. However, when the CNoR opened the Lulu Island branch line in 1917, it connected with the British Columbia Electric Railway (BCER) Queensborough terminus. Since the original BCER Queensborough bridge was designed for trams, not heavy locomotives, the CNoR westward route 12.02 miles (19.34 km) to Steveston^{a} was an isolated branch line. After the CNR absorption of the bankrupt CNoR, the money-losing branch, and damage to trestles from a 1918 muskeg fire at Mile 4, terminated all services.

In July 1930, work began on sinking piers for the 4,200-foot-long bridge with a 240-foot central span. On completion in November 1931, work trains carried the steel rails across the bridge to lay 14 miles (23 km) of track for the Lulu Island industrial branch line. This comprised two north–south lines from west of the new bridge to connect with the remnants of the original east–west line at the south arm, with a scheduled completion date for the $2m project before yearend.

Owing to the proximity of several bridges on the Fraser, the unique signal for the opening of the Lulu Island Bridge was four long blasts on the vessel's horn.

In 2013, CN removed the observer-operator from the Lulu Island bridge, and now monitors river traffic by camera from the Fraser River Bridge in New Westminster.

^a. The former BCER "Y" at today's Branscombe Court.

== See also ==
- List of crossings of the Fraser River
- List of bridges in Canada
