= Marpole Bridge (1889) =

- Coordinates: 49.197828°N 123.135250°W
- Carries: Vehicular traffic, pedestrians
- Crosses: Fraser River north and middle arms
- Locale: Marpole-Richmond

Characteristics
- Design: Truss bridge

History
- Inaugurated: 1889

Location
- Interactive map of Marpole Bridge

The Marpole Bridge (1889–1957), a.k.a. Eburne Bridge, North Arm Bridge, Sea Island Bridge, or Middle Arm Bridge, was consecutive crossings over the north and middle arms of the Fraser River in Metro Vancouver.

== History ==
=== Structural deficiencies ===
The initial crossing between north Eburne and Richmond was a manually-cranked-cable scow.

In 1888, the San Francisco Bridge Co. began work on the two timber truss bridges, with steel swing spans, connecting north Eburne with Lulu Island via the eastern tip of south Eburne. Completed in November 1889, the set of low-level two-lane bridges opened that December, and the Municipality of Richmond assumed responsibility for their maintenance. On January 3, 1890, an ice sheet carried by the incoming tide destroyed the Lulu Island span, which remained out of service for most of 1890. Shortly after reopening, the span fell into the river. Over the decades, river traffic found the narrow spans difficult to navigate, and the first collision causing structural damage was 1891.

In 1901, the province agreed to assume responsibility for the planked bridges. To provide two more years life, the plan was to replace the two wooden swings with steel swing spans, and replace the trestle approaches, but extensive rot in the piers revised the project to a complete rebuild. McLean Bros. and Canadian Bridge Co. completed the 1,682-foot and 1,150-foot Howe truss bridges in 1902.

During 1909–10, 18 piles were replaced, 1,100 feet of decking was replanked, and the Lulu Island trestle approach repaired. In 1919–20, 100 feet of asphalt were laid as an experimental surface, and the turning gear for the swing spans became electrically powered. Assumedly prior to this time, manually rotating a capstan slowly moved the span. Redecking occurred most years.

=== Final rebuild and protection ===
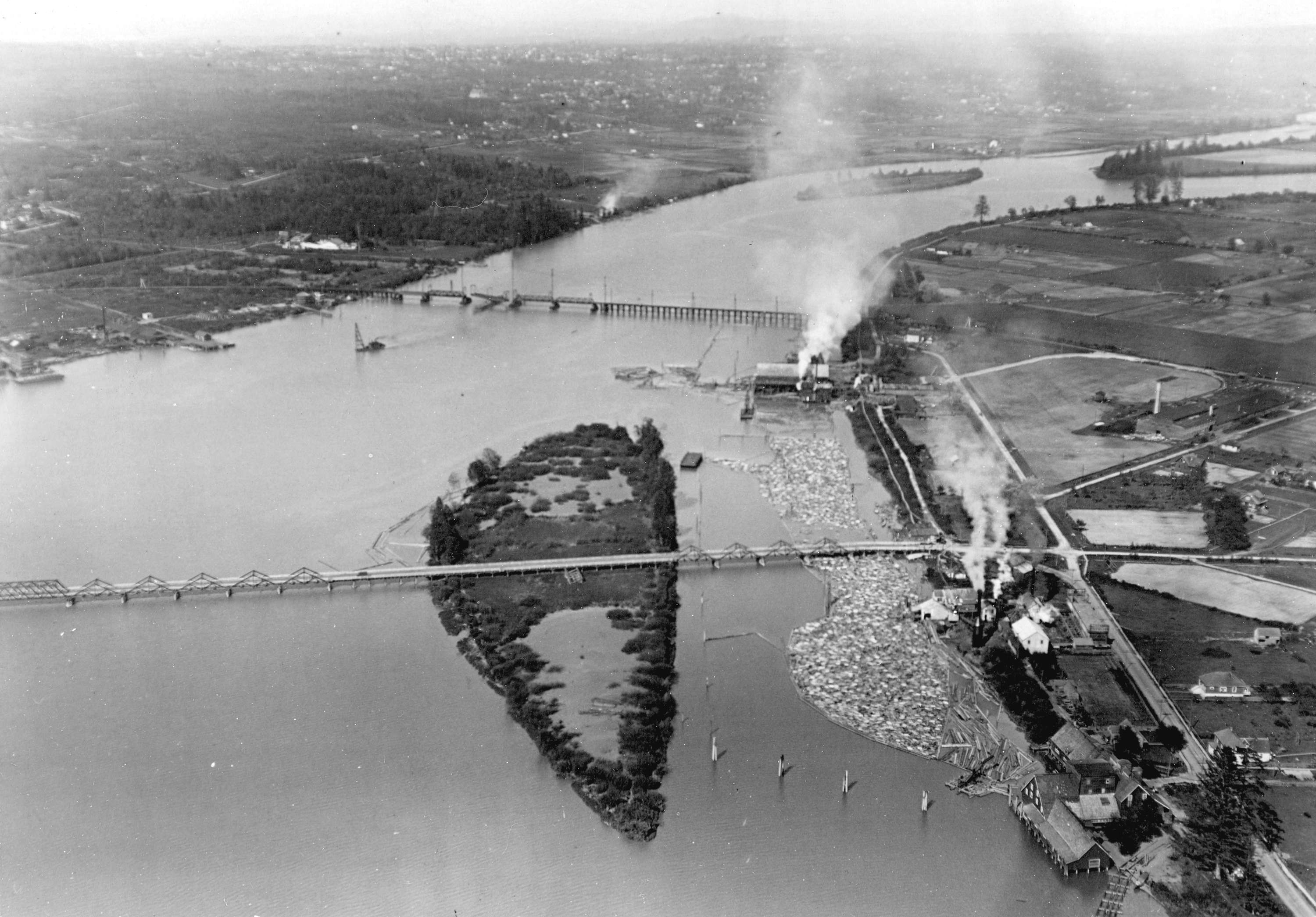
North-eastward, with Middle Arm of Eburne vehicle bridge in foreground across Duck Island, and North Arm CP rail bridge in background, 1919

During 1924–25, Nickson Construction and Hamilton Bridge Works commenced building combined steel and timber bridges to replace the existing ones, with the new decks asphalted the following year.

In official classification, the north arm span was Eburne No. 4 and the middle arm Eburne No. 5. In 1934–35, the decking was renewed and asphalted.

A guard patrolled the crossing during World War II. For 1942–43, major repairs included new piling in the protection piers, new dolphins, and extensive timber replacement in the Howe trusses. During 1948–49, major repairs were required on several occasions due to barge strikes.

In 1951–52, a new Howe truss floated into place for No. 4, with major repairs to the substructure, and a complete renewal of ties and deck. The following year, No. 5 received a new 130-foot Howe truss, new ties and deck, and solid fill replaced the approach trestles to the southeast. Ultimately, the reclamation of this whole area made Duck Island part of Lulu Island.

Numerous blows from passing barges to the No. 4 outer piers necessitated minor closures during 1955–56, while pier and span were jacked back into position. Damage sustained the next year required the complete replacement of one pier.

=== Congestion and replacement ===
By 1928, over 4,400 vessels annually passed through the No. 4 draw, considerably delaying road traffic. Openings increased to about 5,400 by 1936, and over 7,000 by 1954 (images). Increasing vehicle backups, due to openings for river traffic, delayed travel to Vancouver International Airport, owned by Vancouver City up to 1961. Since the 1930s, an ongoing dispute between the province and the city over funding delayed a replacement bridge.

During the planning stage, the Oak Street Bridge, opened in 1957, was known as the New Marpole Bridge, becoming its replacement. Throughout 1958–61, Public Works dismantled the closed No. 4, with the remaining swing span, swing span pier, and protection piers, removed by a contractor. Although the Moray Bridge replaced the No. 5 in 1957, the structure was not finally dismantled until 1965–66. The new crossing configuration created a more circuitous route between Vancouver and the airport, causing traffic delays when the Moray Bridge opened for boats. The Arthur Laing Bridge, completed in 1975, restored a direct route.

== See also ==
- List of crossings of the Fraser River
- List of BC bridges
