= Water Avenue Bridge =

Bridge on British Columbia Highway 1

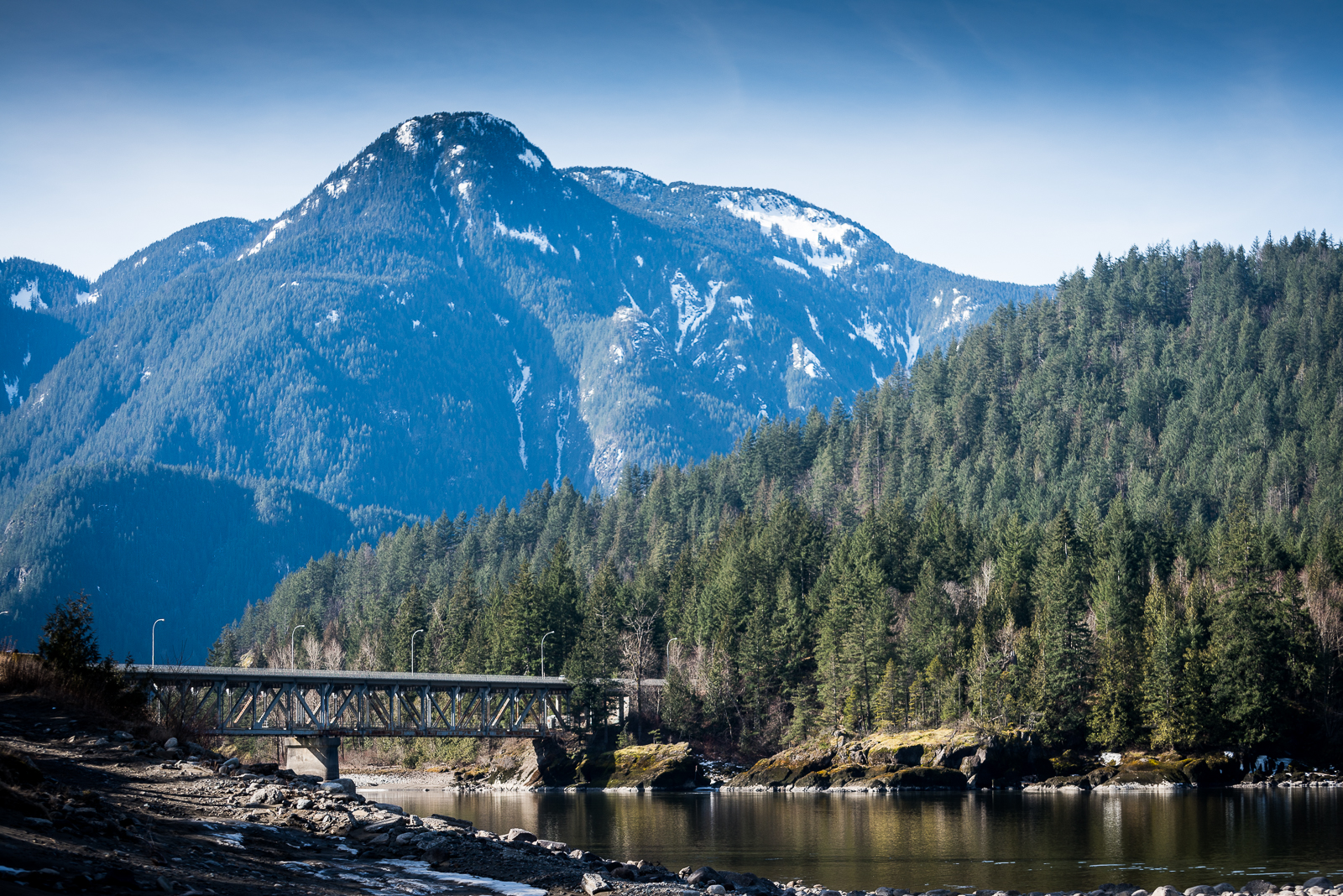
- Coordinates: 49°23′11″N 121°27′08″W
- Carries: 2 lanes of Highway 1 (TCH)
- Crosses: Fraser River
- Locale: Hope–Haig
- Other name(s): Bill Hartley Fraser-Hope Bridge
- Owner: Ministry of Transportation and Infrastructure

Characteristics
- Design: steel truss
- Total length: 291 metres (954 ft 8 in)

History
- Opened: 1915

The Water Avenue Bridge, officially known as the Bill Hartley Fraser-Hope Bridge, is a steel Howe truss bridge spanning the Fraser River in the Fraser Valley region of southwestern British Columbia. Linking Hope with the northwest shore, the two-lane bridge carries BC Highway 1 on an upper deck.

== Former ferries ==
The first ferry charter was granted in 1859 during the Fraser Canyon Gold Rush. The capacity of the ferry scow was eight horses or a four-horse loaded team and driver.

Following the establishment of the Canadian Pacific Railway (CP) station across the Fraser from Hope in the mid-1880s, First Nations ferried passengers across the river. For two decades, a few indigenous families held a ferrying monopoly. By 1901, they used a scow.

When a subsidized service was introduced in 1910, J.F. Boulter was awarded the charter. However, Luke Gibson, who had a steamboat charter for 3 kilometres (2 mi) either side of Hope for several years prior, appears to have maintained that operation at least until 1912. During the wintertime, a channel was cut through the ice for the subsidized ferry scow.

The arrival of the Canadian Northern Railway (CNo) rail head on the southeastern shore in summer 1912 ended dependence upon the ferry to reach a rail line.

After a three-month season in 1916, the subsidized ferry service permanently ceased. During the final years, the Hope Transfer Company held the charter. Hope Town Landing and Hope Upper Landing were the two east bank terminals and Haig Station the west bank one. Hours of operation were 7am to 8pm.

== Bridge construction and opening ==
Armstrong & Morrison was awarded the contract for the substructure (concrete piers and abutments). The work schedule was three shifts daily. In February 1914, an ice flow destroyed 76 metres (250 ft) of falsework. Caissons were built for the piers, towed out during low water, and sunk in place. The three piers were 7 by 15 metres (24 by 50 ft) and 26 metres (85 ft) high, of which 9 metres (30 ft) was above the river level.

The Canadian Bridge Co was awarded the superstructure, which comprised four 73-metre (238 ft) steel through Howe truss spans. In September 1914, railway track was laid from the CP main line to deliver steel for the superstructure. That December, CP laid track along the lower level of the bridge, but the bridge was not ready for normal rail use for several months. In September 1915, the upper level opened to highway traffic. The BC government contributed $200,000 and the federal government $250,000 toward the $560,000 construction cost.

== Railway operation ==
The bridge connected the Kettle Valley Railway (KV) with the CP main line at Petain (renamed Odlum in 1940). KV passenger service at the Hope station existed July 1916–November 1959. The identity of the groups providing armed bridge guards during World War I and World War II at this strategic dual use crossing is unclear. A freight service was maintained until the rails on the bridge were lifted in 1970. Security fencing has blocked access to the lower level in recent decades.

== Highway operation and upgrades ==
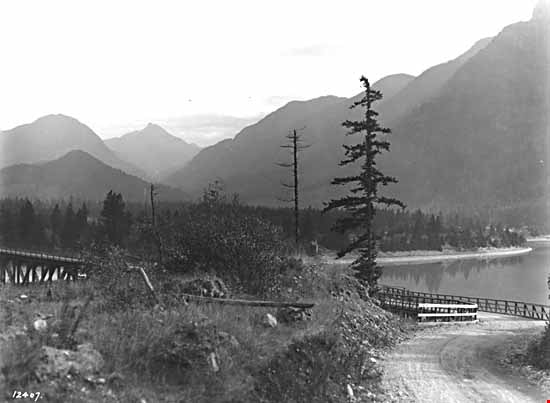
Eastward view of the north end of Fraser-Hope Bridge, Hope, 1929

In 1921–22, the northwestern trestle approach for the highway was rebuilt to remove a dangerous curve. In 1926–27, the southeastern trestle approach was also rebuilt with a gentle curve.

To eliminate a railway crossing at the northwestern end, a fill and trestle were completed in 1937, which carried the highway over the railway line.

In 1942, the road grade approaches were reconstructed. In 1945, the dousing of a grass fire beneath the southeastern end of the bridge averted damage to the trestle. In 1947–48, new trestle approaches were built.

In 1950–51, the bridge was redecked with a thin reinforced concrete deck-slab.

During the site excavations for the new approaches in 1993, First Nations artifacts were discovered on both banks. Pre-cast concrete beams supported by concrete pillars replaced the former approaches in 1995, and the bridge deck was widened in 1996. In March 1996, during the placement of steel beams, the construction crane tipped, dropping a beam into the river. In 1999, a bronze plaque for an official dedication ceremony was recast as the Bill Hartley Fraser-Hope Bridge but failed to placate widespread protests over renaming the bridge after the former politician.

== Major vehicle accidents ==
In 1929, a car plunged off the northwestern approach onto the railway track below, killing the three occupants.

In 1948, the four occupants died, when a car skidded into a guard rail, careened to the opposite rail, and plunged 15 metres (50 ft) to the beach below.

In 1970, when a truck crashed into the safety rails, the ejected driver landed on the street 15 metres (50 ft) below.

In 1982, when a car struck the northwestern abutment, the passenger later died of his injuries.

In 1997, two passengers in a car died in a head-on collision with a truck at the southeast end curve. In 1998, the two occupants died when a truck rolled at the same curve.

In 2001, a head-on collision between two trucks was the sixth death on the southeast end curve since the mid-1990s reconstruction. In 2005, an overturned tractor-trailer, which a pickup struck, claimed two lives on the bridge. In 2007, a truck flipped at the southeast end, killing the driver. In 2008, a truck smashed through a row of barricades, three lampposts, and the bridge deck barrier and railing, before leaving the tractor teetering over the edge with the trailer dangling below.

An innovative speed sign installed in 2007 has largely eliminated fatal accidents.

== See also ==
- List of crossings of the Fraser River
- List of bridges in British Columbia
