= Q to Q Ferry =

Passenger Ferry in New Westminster, British Columbia

- Locale: New Westminster, British Columbia
- Waterway: Fraser River (North Arm)
- Transit type: Passenger ferry
- Owner: City of New Westminster
- Operator: Bowen Land and Sea Taxi
- Began operation: August 2017; 8 years ago
- System length: 1.1 km (0.59 nmi; 0.68 mi)
- No. of lines: 1
- No. of vessels: 1
- No. of terminals: 2

The Q to Q Ferry is a passenger ferry in New Westminster, British Columbia. It crosses the north arm of the Fraser River to carry people between the New Westminster Quay and Queensborough, a neighbourhood of the city located on Lulu Island. It was first established in 2017 as a pilot project to provide a more efficient and pedestrian-friendly method of transportation between Queensborough and the New Westminster mainland, which at the time was only connected by the Queensborough Bridge.

Following a successful season in 2017, the City of New Westminster decided to run the ferry permanently, with the exception of some parts of winter due to weather and safety concerns.

In 2021, the City of New Westminster decided to rename the docks at each end of the ferry route the "Komagata Maru Docks", to commemorate the victims of the Komagata Maru incident. This was done alongside an apology from New Westminster City Council for their predecessors' role in disallowing the Komagata Maru passengers entry into Canada in 1914.

Local politicians have considered attempting to make the Q to Q Ferry a part of the larger TransLink public transit system of Metro Vancouver, but no formal plan has been made as of 2023.

== See also ==
- Barnston Island Ferry
- SeaBus
