= Simon Fraser Bridge =

- Coordinates: 53°53′26″N 122°44′53″W
- Carries: Four lanes of British Columbia Highway 97, pedestrians and bicycles
- Crosses: Fraser River
- Locale: Prince George

Characteristics
- Design: Deck Truss bridge
- Total length: 400 m

History
- Opened: 1963 (southbound); 2009 (northbound)

Statistics
- Daily traffic: 22,000

Location
- Interactive map of Simon Fraser Bridge

The Simon Fraser Bridge is a deck truss bridge on Highway 97, spanning the Fraser River in Prince George, British Columbia. It was originally a two-lane bridge, and was completed in 1963. It carries approximately 22,000 vehicles per day. In 2009, a 50 million dollar project to twin the bridge was completed. The new bridge carrying two lanes of northbound traffic is approximately 390 metres in length, whereas the two lanes of southbound traffic are directed across the original bridge.

The bridge was named to honour the fur trader and explorer Simon Fraser, who established the town of Prince George, and who descended the river from near this spot in 1805.

== See also ==
- List of crossings of the Fraser River
- List of bridges in Canada
