= Marpole =

Marpole c̓əsnaʔəm
- Neighbourhood
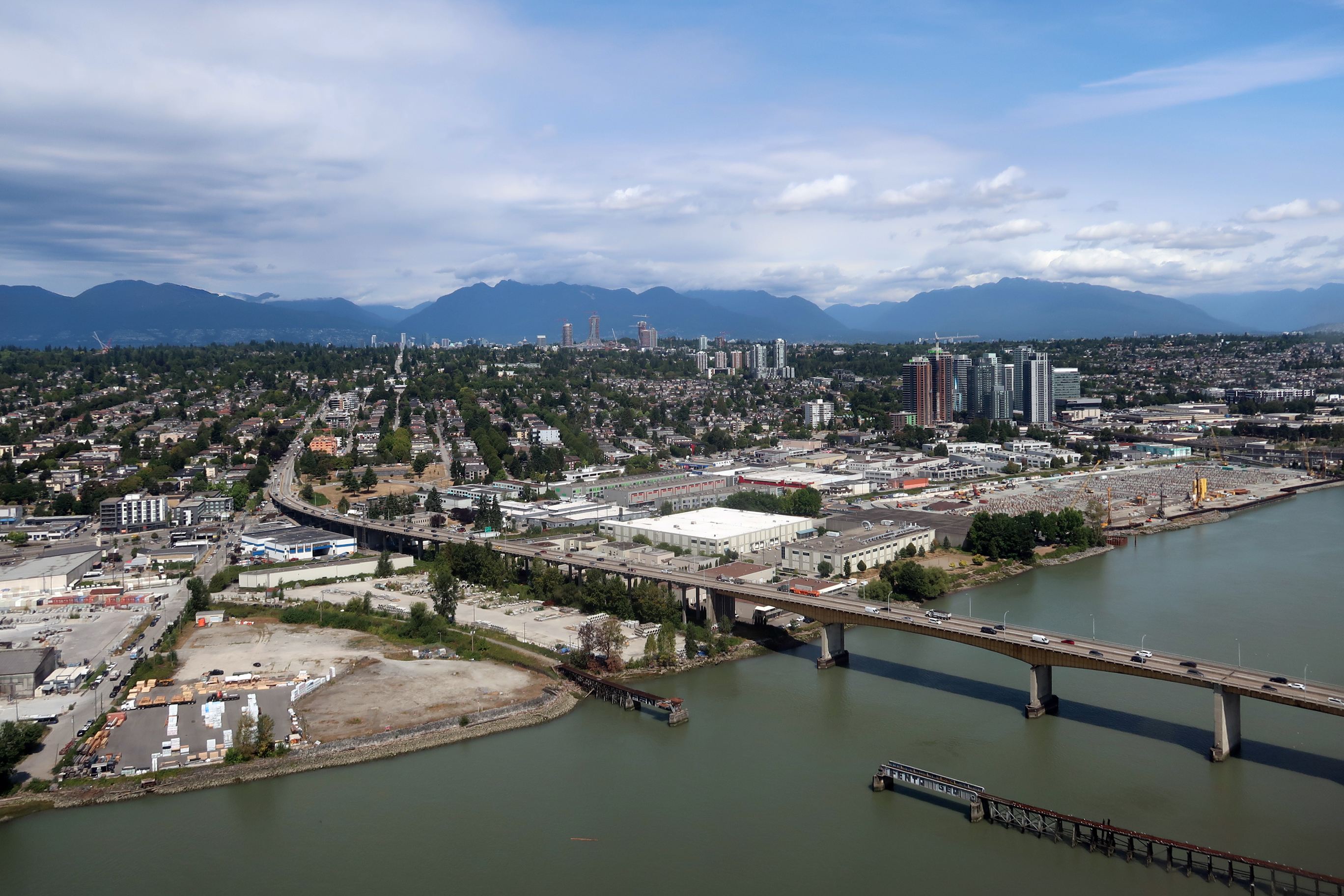
- Aerial view of Marpole in 2025

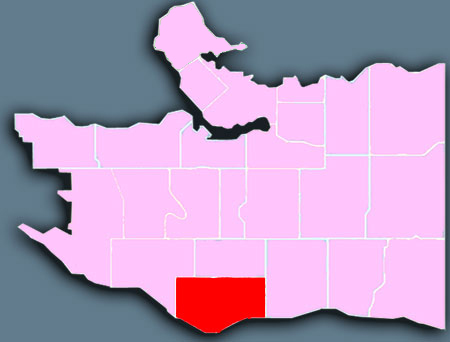
- Location of Marpole in Vancouver

- Location in Metro Vancouver
- Coordinates: 49.215530°N 123.113960°W
- Country: Canada
- Province: British Columbia
- City: Vancouver

Area
  - Total: 5.59 km^{2} (2.16 sq mi)

Population (2016)
  - Total: 24,460
  - Density: 4,375.6/km^{2} (11,333/sq mi)

Marpole is a mostly residential neighbourhood of 23,832 in 2011, located on the southern edge of the city of Vancouver, British Columbia, immediately northeast of Vancouver International Airport, and is approximately bordered by Angus Drive to the west, 57th Avenue to the north, Ontario Street to the east and the Fraser River to the south. It has undergone many changes in the 20th century, with the influx of traffic and development associated with the construction of the Oak Street Bridge (which leads to Highway 99 leading to the southern suburbs) and the Arthur Laing Bridge (which leads to Vancouver International Airport).

== History ==
Marpole is one of Vancouver's oldest communities. The Great Marpole Midden, an ancient Musqueam village and burial site, one of North America's largest village sites and "one of the largest pre-contact middens on the Pacific coast of Canada", has been a National Historic Site since 1933. According to the Musqueam, it dates back at least 4,000 years.

A longhouse, dated to 5 AD, was located near present-day Marine Drive in South Vancouver, and belonged to the ancient Marpole First Nation.

Non-natives began to inhabit the area in the 1860s, calling it Eburne Station. The small town was separated from the city by miles of forest.

At the turn of the 20th century, the Vancouver Lulu Island Railway of the British Columbia Electric Railway interurban train was constructed, which triggered the development of sawmills, shingle mills, and gravel companies in the region. The area was renamed after Richard Marpole in 1916, and by the time it joined Vancouver in 1929, it had become one of the area's major industrial centres.

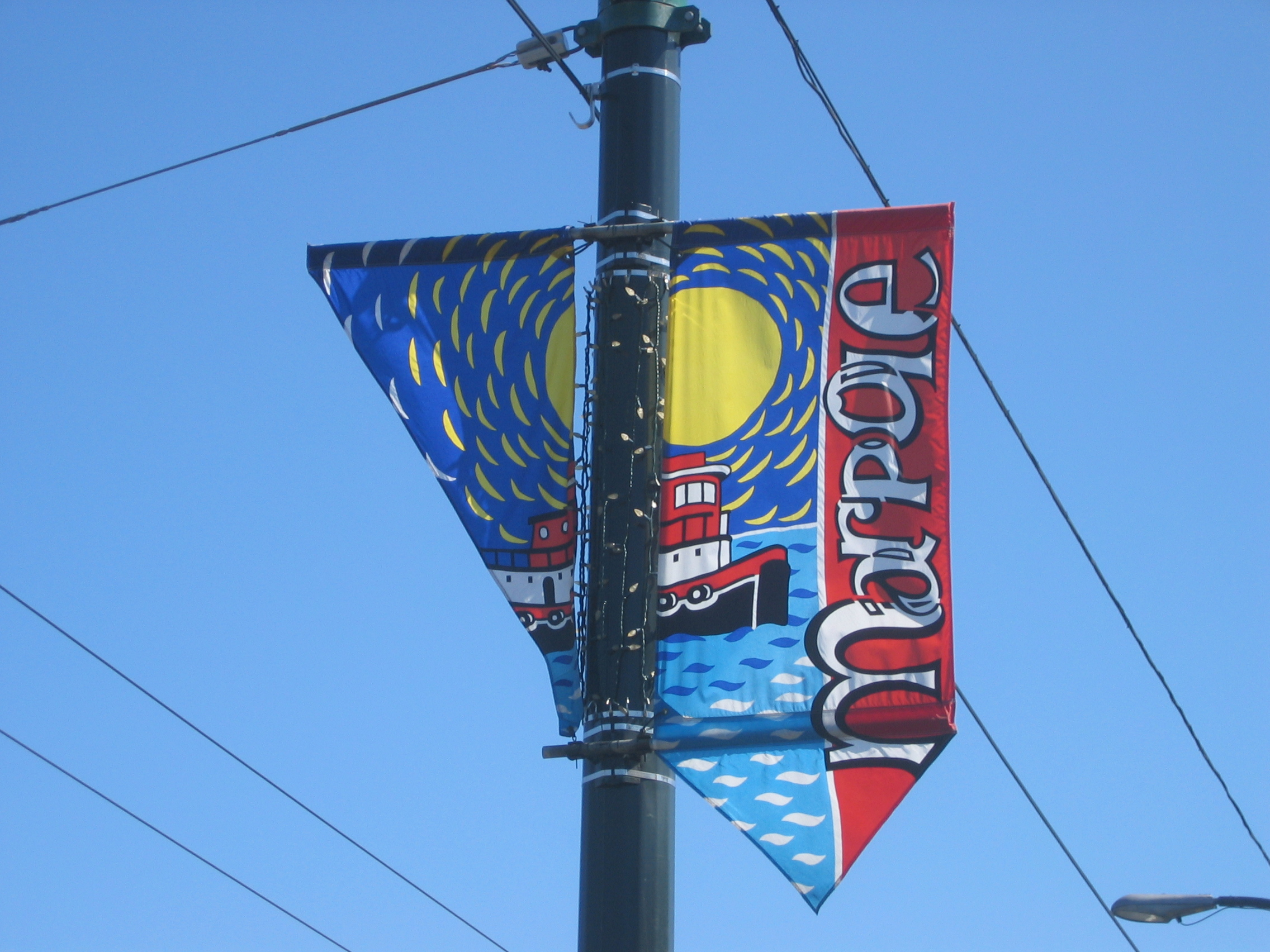
Marpole street banner

The Oak Street Bridge was completed in 1957 and was partly responsible for a downturn in business around the Marine and Hudson area, as traffic shifted to the east. The 1975 opening of the Arthur Laing Bridge helped shift the business area back to the west, along Granville Street.

== Transportation ==
Because of the Oak and Arthur Laing Bridges, traffic jams are common in the area, especially during peak hours. However, it is well-served by public transit, which is run by TransLink and operated by Coast Mountain Bus Company.

In September 2009, the Canada Line replaced most of the suburban routes and the 98 B-Line. It runs under Cambie Street, and has a bus connecting surface station at Marine Drive, with a future station at 57th Avenue.

Marpole is also directly across the Fraser River from Vancouver International Airport. Located on Sea Island in Richmond, it is the second busiest airport in Canada.

== Demographics ==
37 percent of Marpole residents’ mother tongue was either Mandarin or Cantonese, and 42 percent of the area's populace identified as Chinese in 2006. 59 percent of the population of Marpole was born outside of Canada.

Panethnic groups in the Marpole neighbourhood (2001−2016)
| Panethnic group | 2016 | | 2006 | | 2001 | |
| Panethnic group | Pop. | % | Pop. | % | Pop. | % |
|---|---|---|---|---|---|---|
| East Asian (Note: Statistic includes total responses of "Chinese", "Korean", and "Japanese" under visible minority section on census.) | 11,510 | 47.69% | 11,415 | 49.09% | 9,600 | 44.16% |
| European (Note: Statistic includes all persons that did not make up part of a visible minority or an indigenous identity.) | 7,655 | 31.72% | 8,465 | 36.4% | 9,215 | 42.39% |
| Southeast Asian (Note: Statistic includes total responses of "Filipino" and "Southeast Asian" under visible minority section on census.) | 2,245 | 9.3% | 1,545 | 6.64% | 1,300 | 5.98% |
| South Asian | 750 | 3.11% | 630 | 2.71% | 655 | 3.01% |
| Middle Eastern (Note: Statistic includes total responses of "West Asian" and "Arab" under visible minority section on census.) | 455 | 1.89% | 150 | 0.65% | 250 | 1.15% |
| Indigenous | 370 | 1.53% | 245 | 1.05% | 230 | 1.06% |
| Latin American | 360 | 1.49% | 215 | 0.92% | 100 | 0.46% |
| African | 250 | 1.04% | 265 | 1.14% | 145 | 0.67% |
| Other/multiracial (Note: Statistic includes total responses of "Visible minority, n.i.e." and "Multiple visible minorities" under visible minority section on census.) | 550 | 2.28% | 325 | 1.4% | 245 | 1.13% |
| Total responses | 24,135 | 98.67% | 23,255 | 97.77% | 21,740 | 96.99% |
| Total population | 24,460 | 100% | 23,785 | 100% | 22,415 | 100% |
Note: Totals greater than 100% due to multiple origin responses

== Economy ==
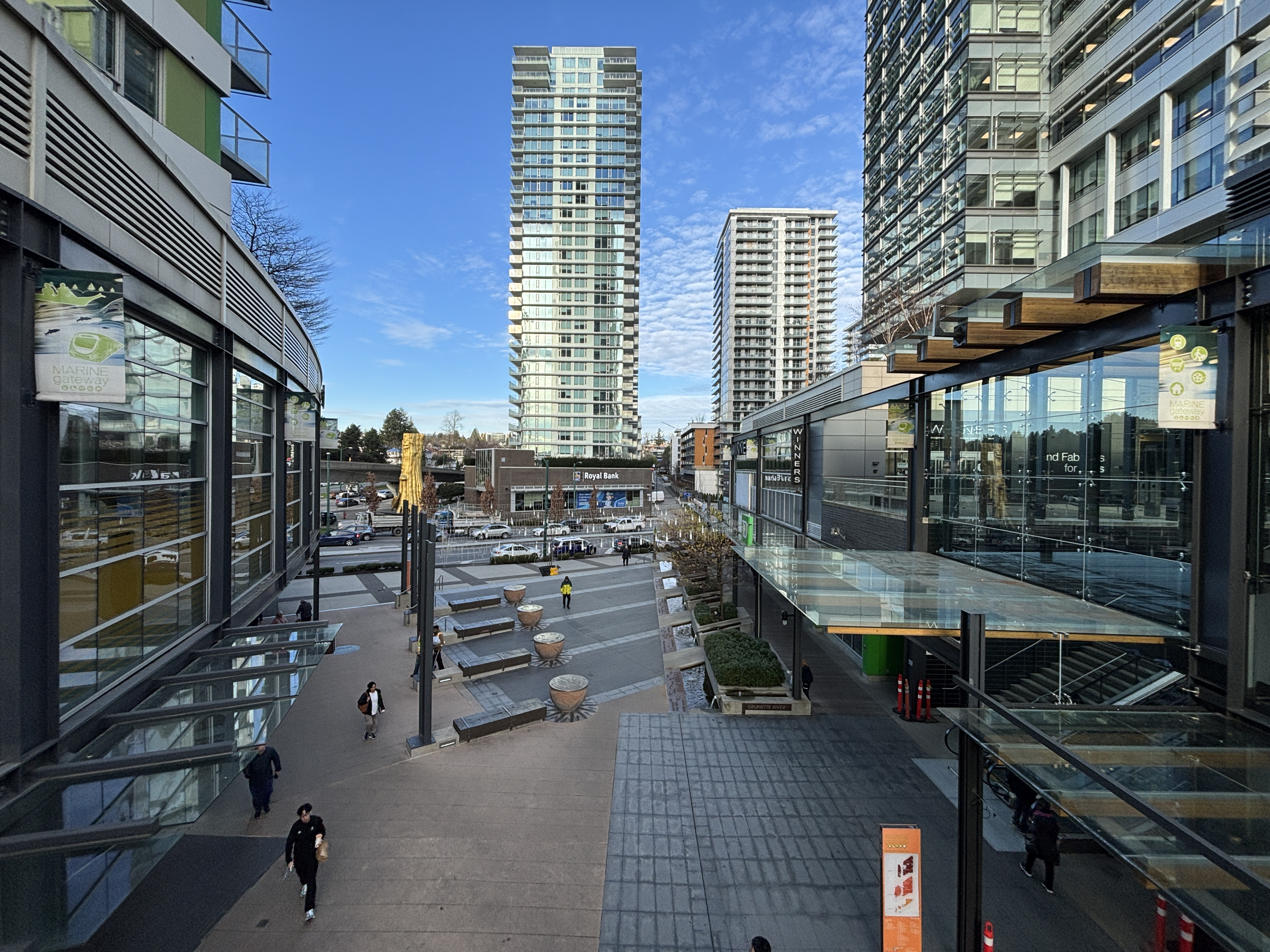
Marine Gateway

Most of Marpole's stores are centred along the southern end of Granville Street. There are small corner shops located on Oak Street and 67th, and on Cambie at 57th. A number of businesses, ranging from drive-through fast-food eateries to big box stores, manufacturers and distributors are also located along Marine Drive east of the Arthur Laing bridge, with more heavy-industry type businesses are located along the banks of the Fraser River. Just west of the Arthur Laing bridge is the old Fraser Arms Hotel, now a strip mall and liquor store. Just west of the Fraser Arms is the approximate location of the Great Marpole Midden. The West 70th Avenue area is currently undergoing some revitalization, with the redevelopment of the Safeway grocery store, partnered with residential condo towers.

Another large commercial district has been approved for Marpole, which will be in the eastern portion of the neighbourhood. The intersection of Marine Drive and Cambie Street was designated by the City of Vancouver as the "Marine Landing" precinct of the Cambie Corridor. Two developments in the Marine Landing precinct have been approved and are currently under construction. "Marine Gateway", which will sit atop Marine Drive station, will provide two residential towers, one office tower and a large amount of commercial and retail space, including movie theatres and a grocery store. The second development, MC2 on the northeast corner of the intersection will provide two residential towers and a small amount of retail at the ground level. The third site, on the northwest corner (previously the site of a Petro-Canada gas station), was finished in 2018 and hosts high rise condominiums anchored by ground-level retail services.

== Education ==
There are six elementary schools in the Marpole area. These include:

- David Lloyd George Elementary School
- Sir Wilfrid Laurier Elementary School
  - Laurier Annex
- McKechnie Elementary School
- J. W. Sexsmith Elementary School
- St. Anthony of Padua Independent Catholic School

There are no high schools that fall within Marpole's borders; however, Sir Winston Churchill Secondary School sits just across 57th Avenue in Oakridge and serves the majority of the neighbourhood. Magee Secondary School serves the western portion of the neighbourhood.

The Laurier Annex closed in 2017; its students merged with Laurier Elementary.

== Healthcare ==
George Pearson Centre is located in Marpole. It is a centre that specializes with adults with disabilities who require special assistance. This site is also undergoing a redevelopment program.

== Joy Kogawa's Obasan ==
Joy Kogawa's bestselling novel, Obasan, which tells the story of Canada's internment and persecution of its citizens of Japanese descent during World War II, partially takes place in Marpole, in a tiny bungalow located at 1450 West 64th Avenue. Joy Kogawa (née Nakayama, born 1935) lived there as a child, and in 2006 the house was purchased by the Land Conservancy of British Columbia following a nationwide fundraising campaign. The 1912 house stands as a cultural and historical reminder of the war-time experience of Canadians of Japanese heritage, who were interned in remote camps and their property expropriated during World War II.

Today, the Historic Joy Kogawa House Society, a community-based group of arts supporters, operates a writer-in-residence program at the house with a long-term from new owners, the City of Vancouver. The writer-in-residence program has been under way since 2009 and, during that time, has enriched the literary community and fostered an appreciation for Canadian writing by bringing well-regarded professional writers in touch with a local community of writers, readers, and students. The writer-in-residence program celebrates the work of Joy Kogawa, which brought the war-time experience of Japanese-Canadians to general awareness among Canadians.

== Winona Park ==
Winona Park is a park in the Marpole neighbourhood just south of the Langara golf course. It has three levels, each being the size of a football field. Unlike many similar parks that contain large grass fields, Winona Park is not attached to any community centre or school. It is in an area that consists mostly of low-density residential housing, and organized sports clubs require an explicit permit for use of the fields.

In addition to the three parallel fields mentioned above, the park also features a small children's playground which consists of a slide, several bars, a tire swing, and four swings. It is notable that the terracing of the three fields and the natural southern aspect of the land in the area allows a spectacular southern view, featuring the North Arm Fraser River and into the Richmond delta. It is said that on a clear day with minimal smog interference, one is able to see tens and tens of kilometres into the distance. Also, since most of the park is composed of grass expanses to accommodate the fields, a light breeze is present even on mostly windless days and grants us relief from the heat of the summer sun. The park is not without shade, however, as there are large trees planted in a linear fashion between each of the levels of the park.

== See also ==
- British Columbia Electric Railway
- Vancouver

== Citation ==
- "Community Profiles: Marpole", City of Vancouver, Vancouver, BC, 19 February 2005
- "Canada's Historic Places: Marpole Midden National Historic Site of Canada", Canadian Register, Parks Canada, 2010
- "Musqueam: a living culture", Musqueam Indian Band, Vancouver, BC, 2011, archived from the original on 7 December 2013
- Tanglao, Roland (2005), Historic Joy Kogawa House, archived from the original on 12 December 2013
- "Kogawa house: childhood home of Joy Kogawa", The Land Conservancy, Victoria, BC
- "Marpole: exploring the community" (PDF), City of Vancouver, Community Planning Profile, 2013, archived from the original (PDF) on 25 May 2013
