= No. 2 Road Bridge =

Bridge across the Middle Arm of the Fraser River in British Columbia, Canada

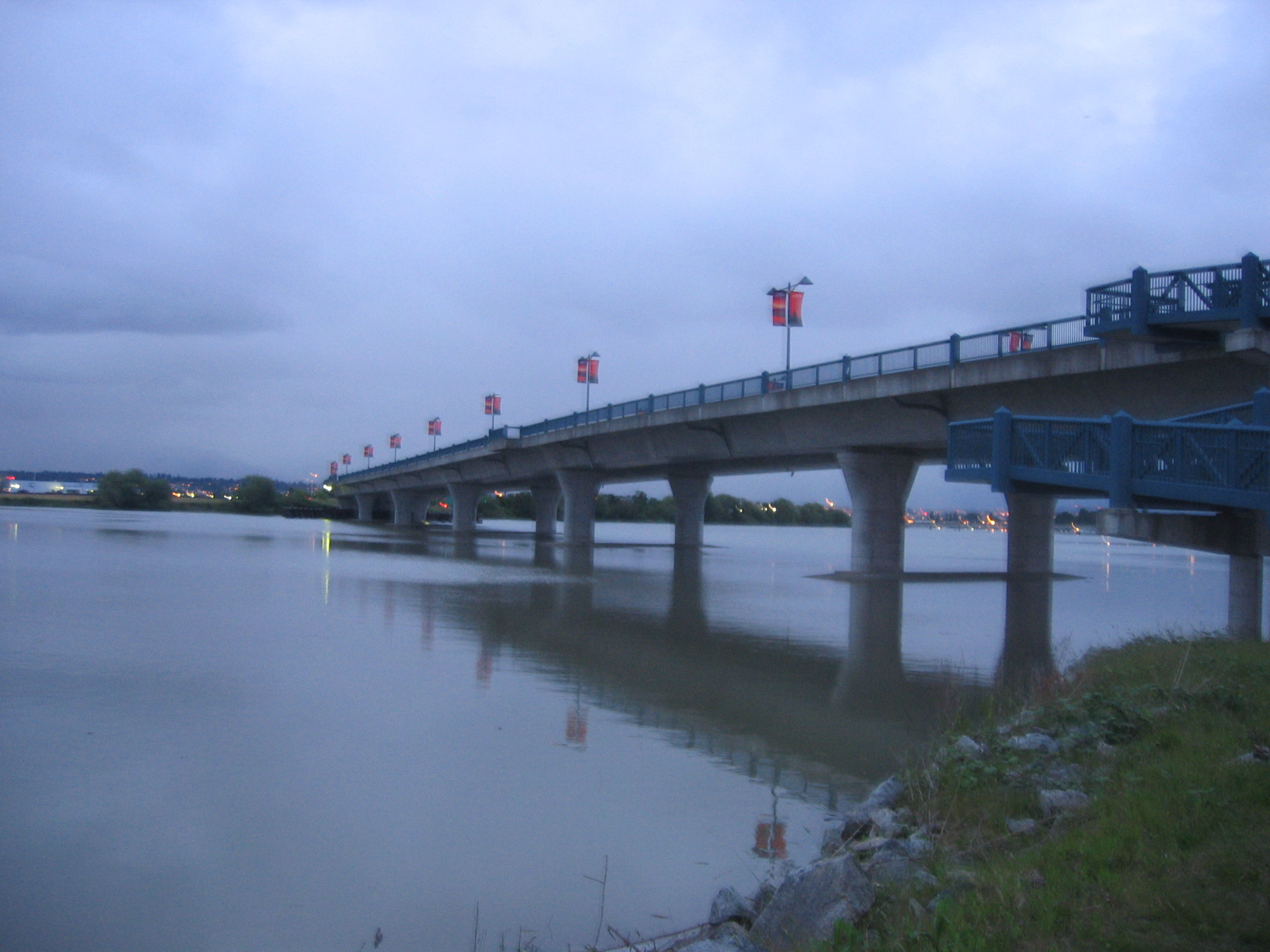
- Coordinates: 49°10′34.74″N 123°9′25.03″W
- Carries: Four lanes of No. 2 Road, pedestrians and bicycles
- Crosses: Middle Arm Fraser River
- Locale: Richmond
- Maintained by: City of Richmond

Characteristics
- Design: Box girder bridge
- Total length: 560 m
- Width: 22 m

History
- Opened: July 11, 1993

Location
- Interactive map of No. 2 Road Bridge

The No. 2 Road Bridge is a crossing over the middle arm of the Fraser River, and River Rd., in Metro Vancouver.

== History ==
=== No. 2 Road Bridge ===
During the planning stage, the creation of additional intertidal marsh and riparian woodlands compensated for the project-related impact upon the intertidal basin. Over subsequent decades, the enclosed 3,500-square-metre constructed marsh and adjacent natural marshes, along the southern shoreline, have proven effective in protecting the plant, fish and wildlife habitat.

The City of Richmond funded the $39m construction using debt, existing reserves, and a $5m provincial grant. The scheme was the biggest capital project the city had undertaken to that point. The city paid the final loan installment in 2013. The span connects Lulu Island with Sea Island, home to Vancouver International Airport (YVR).

At the official opening ceremony in July 1993, Art Charbonneau, the provincial Minister of Transportation and Highways, unveiled a plaque, and Mayor Greg Halsey-Brandt cut the ribbon. After pedestrians walked, jogged or ran the span, cars crossed a few hours later. No doubt, John Miller, principal of JJM Group, the prime contactor, would have been present. A public survey chose the bland name. Although some suggestions at the time, and since, preferred to honour a public figure, any consensus could prove difficult.

The city owns and maintains this low-level four-lane bridge, having bicycle lanes and a wide, separated sidewalk. On the north bank, a trail passing beneath the bridge connects the sidewalks. On the south bank, a pedestrian ramp on the west side connects with the dyke trail below. The sequential box-girder, prestress, post-tension structure is 560 metres (1,840 ft) long and 22 metres (72 ft) wide, supported by 10 spans resting on 217 prestressed concrete piles. The relatively low profile provides a seamless flow with connecting roads and avoids interference with seaplane traffic, that usually flies westward, low over the bridge, before landing and taxiing to the Middle Arm terminal. A mayoral rival to Halsey-Brandt had campaigned for a less expensive, two-lane span.

From Russ Baker Way, the route provides direct access to No. 2 Rd., and easier access to points further west. Formerly, this traffic would divert southeast across the Dinsmore Bridge, follow a rightward curve along Gilbert Rd., and a leftward curve along Elmbridge Way, before west on Westminster Highway. The new crossing transferred most traffic from the congested Dinsmore.

=== South bank redevelopment ===
At the time of bridge construction, the city seemed unaware of the development potential of its vacant land that stretched to Hollybridge Way. An RV park leased the eastern portion until 2004. Prior to the Richmond Olympic Oval development, River Rd., free of interrupting intersections, was a popular thoroughfare. To offset the oval development costs, the city sold 18.6 acres of riverfront land in early 2007 for $141m. That year, the city realigned this section of River Rd. away from the foreshore.

The planned and completed private development high-rises, called River Green, encompass over 27 acres of shoreline property with unobstructed river views. The four-lane River Rd. between Hollybridge Way and Gilbert Rd. will extend to Capstan Way. However, west of the Oval, the two lanes, the sharp turn from No. 2 Rd., and the sharp S-bend leading beneath the bridge, have a temporary appearance. The underside clearance of 4.0 metres (13.1 ft) is the lowest of any in Richmond. Perhaps the city envisages an overpass at No. 2 Rd. taking River Rd. to a junction with Lynas Lane, thereby transforming the existing foreshore road into a green space.

=== No. 2 Road North pump station ===
Richmond, about one metre (3.3 ft) metre above sea level, requires drainage and flood protection for businesses, agriculture and over 200,000 residents. The city manages 49 kilometres (30 mi) of dykes; 39 drainage pump stations with a combined pumping capacity of over one million gallons per minute; and over 800 kilometres (500 mi) of ditches and storm sewers. Built in 1974, the previous station, with a 1.9 cubic metres (2.5 cu yd) capacity, was near the end of its useful life, and needed an upgrade to 4.7 cubic metres (6.2 cu yd).

The city sought a design that drew attention and engaged the public, with an emphasis on interpretive components, public space and local art. The transparent design of the replacement station, using the existing concrete wet well structure beside the southwestern part of the bridge, allows the public to view the complicated pumping machinery. The Public Works Association of B.C. chose this station for the 2018 Project of the Year award.

== See also ==
- List of crossings of the Fraser River
- List of BC bridges
