= Richard Marpole =

Richard Marpole (9 Oct 1850 in Wales – 8 June 1920, in Vancouver, Canada) was General Superintendent with the Canadian Pacific Railway Pacific Division in Vancouver. In the 1907 Voter's List he is noted as living at the corner of Hastings and Hornby Streets in Vancouver. He directed the CPR interests during the Mission robbery investigation.

At the time of his death, he was in Kamloops with his private railway car to monitor the pursuit and the trial of robbers.

The community Marpole, located in Vancouver South, is named after him.
