= Queensborough Railway Bridge =

- Coordinates: 49°11′50″N 122°55′24″W
- Crosses: North Arm of the Fraser River
- Locale: New Westminster; Queensborough
- Owner: Southern Railway of British Columbia (SRY)

History
- Opened: 1891
- Rebuilt: 1913, 1951

Statistics
- Daily traffic: 8–10 freight trains

Location
- Interactive map of Queensborough Railway Bridge

The Queensborough Railway Bridge, built in 1891 by the city of New Westminster and rebuilt in 1913 and 1951 by the British Columbia Electric Railway, is a swing bridge over the North Arm of the Fraser River in the Lower Mainland of British Columbia, Canada. The bridge connects the community of Queensborough, which is part of New Westminster on Lulu Island, to the rest of New Westminster on the Burrard Peninsula. It was originally a road and rail bridge, but the road part of the bridge was shut down after the opening of the four-lane Queensborough Bridge in 1960.

In the early morning of June 28, 2011, the bridge was damaged when it was hit by a gravel barge owned by Lafarge Canada that was being tugged downstream. The bridge reopened for rail traffic on July 30, although boat traffic took longer to be restored.

== See also ==
- List of bridges in Canada
