= Arthur Laing Bridge =

Bridge connecting Richmond and Vancouver

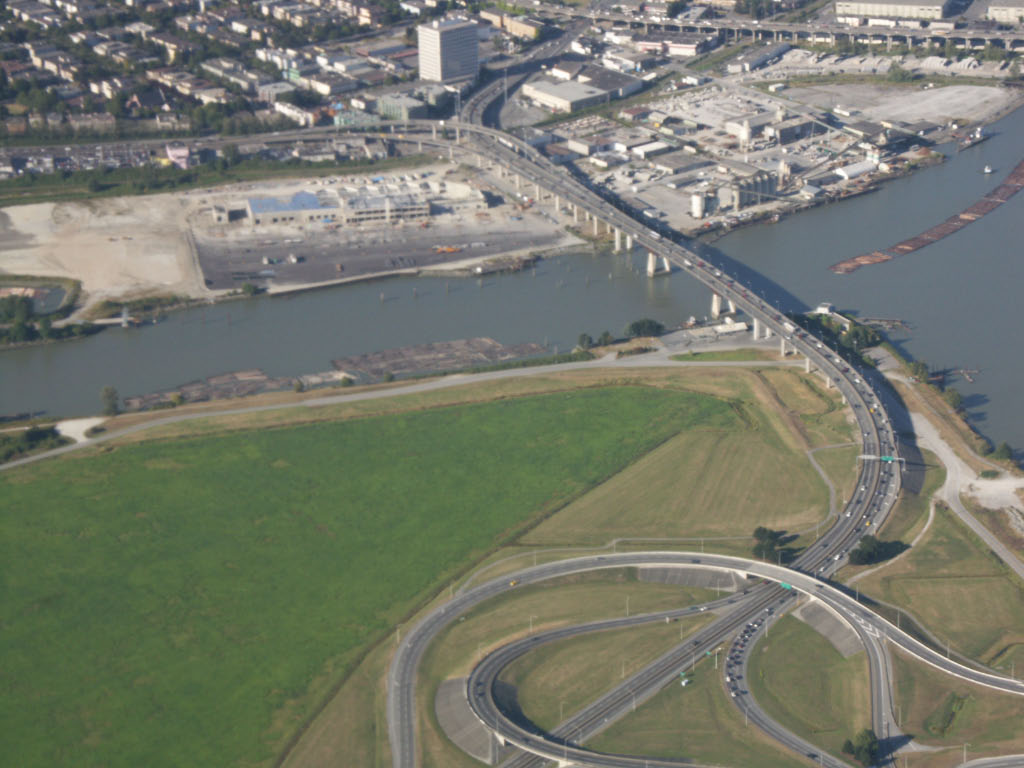
- Coordinates: 49.199317°N 123.135817°W
- Carries: 4 lanes of Grant McConachie Way, bicycles
- Crosses: North Arm Fraser River
- Locale: Richmond; Vancouver
- Maintained by: Vancouver International Airport
- Preceded by: Marpole Bridge

Characteristics
- Design: Cantilever bridge
- Total length: 1676 m
- Width: 20 m
- Longest span: 270 m

History
- Designer: Cochrane Group
- Opened: 27 August 1975

Statistics
- Daily traffic: 79,000

Location
- Interactive map of Arthur Laing Bridge

The Arthur Laing Bridge is a crossing over the north arm of the Fraser River, and several minor roads, in Metro Vancouver.

Connecting Grant McConachie Way with SW Marine Drive, the bridge is 1,676 metres (5,499 ft) long and 20 metres (66 ft) wide, with a 270-metre (890 ft) main span standing 20 metres (66 ft) above the river. The main span comprises haunched (deeper at supports) steel box-girders and the approaches are concrete box-girders. YVR owns and maintains this high-level four-lane crossing, that has no sidewalks, and cyclists ride on the shoulders of the roadway. Being federal property, signage is in both official languages. The Middle Arm SkyTrain Bridge, which opened in 2009, passes over the Arthur Laing southern approach.

== History ==
=== Proposal and opening ===
The closing of the original Marpole Bridge in 1957 created a more circuitous route between Vancouver and Vancouver International Airport (YVR). Years of debate to restore a direct route followed. In 1963, Arthur Laing, Minister of Northern Affairs and National Resources, announced plans for a toll bridge to be completed within three years. By 1965, he was promoting a tunnel. In 1971, Don Jamieson, Minister of Transport announced a toll-free bridge, but the proposed ramps directly accessing bridges to Lulu Island would not be built. Richmond residents were angry.

On September 6, 1974, Pierre Trudeau announced that the new bridge over the north arm of the Fraser River would be named after Arthur Laing, who was a member of House of Commons of Canada from Vancouver.

The bridge opened to traffic on 27 August 1975.

=== Since opening ===
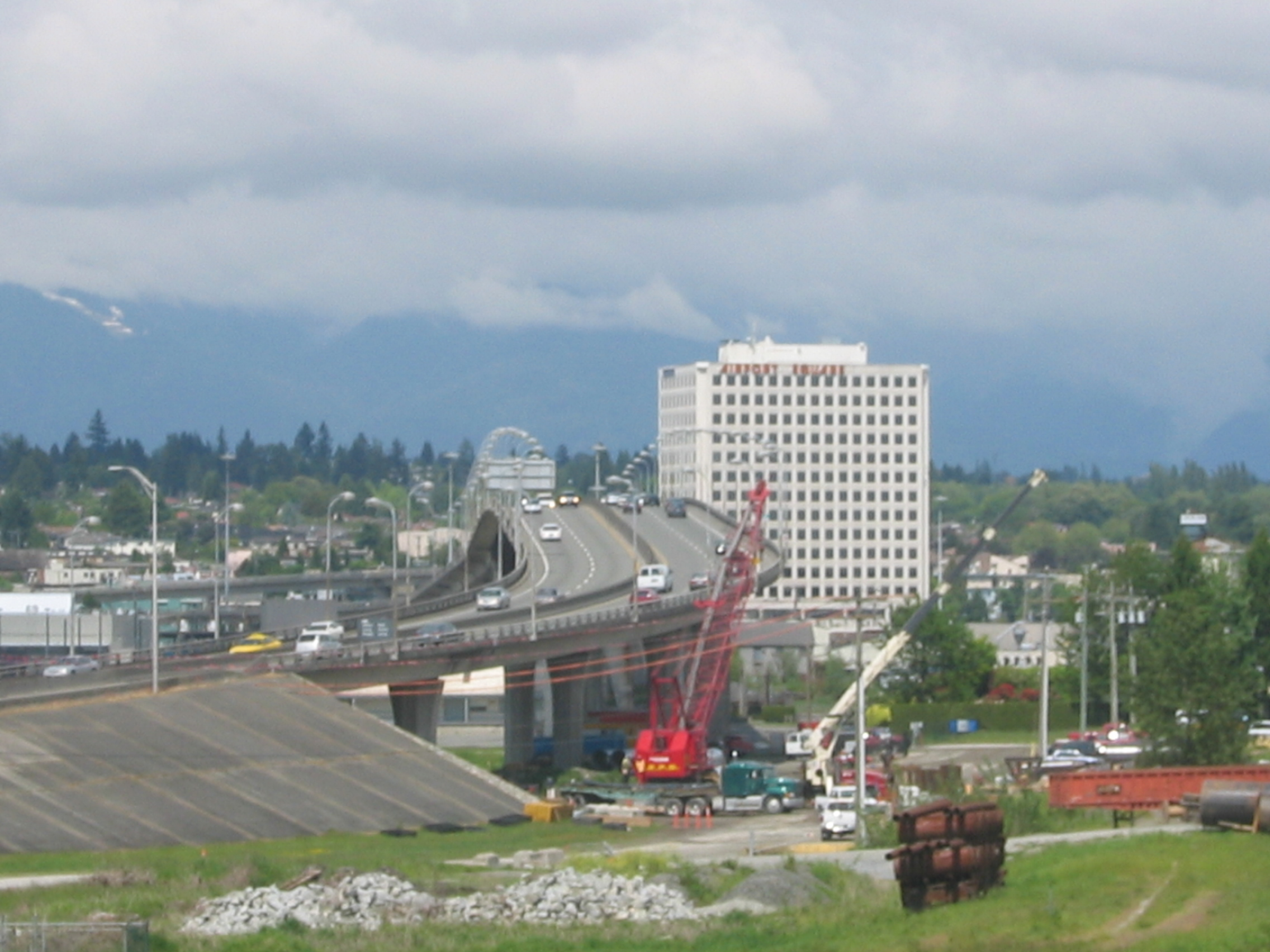
Arthur Laing Bridge, northward to Vancouver, 2006

Otto Lang, Minister of Transport, performed the official opening of the $23m crossing in May 1976. On hand were Premier Bill Bennett, Gil Blair, mayor of Richmond, Art Phillips, mayor of Vancouver, and widow Geraldine Laing, who unveiled a plaque.

In May 1981, a Cessna 172, that ran out of fuel, crash landed on the bridge deck, but caused no injuries.

Claiming concerns over increased congestion on Granville Street, the City of Vancouver opposed access ramps for Richmond traffic. However, since these commuters were already using the bridge by turning at Aviation Avenue, the true impact of ramps would be to reduce travel distance by 3.4 kilometres (2.1 mi), and improve traffic flow on Sea Island. Tom Siddon, member for Burnaby—Richmond—Delta, pressed for the ramps, which opened in 1986.

In 1987, about 45 percent of the 21,200 square metres (25,355 sq yd) deck was milled to about 20 millimetres (0.8 in) to remove salt-contaminated concrete. After patching, the surface received cathodic protection, before placing a 50 millimetres (2.0 in) thick low-slump dense concrete overlay. The exercise closed half the lanes for four months, and cost about $3m.

In the mid-1990s, the bridge underwent seismic upgrades, which comprised deficient bearings, piers and foundations, and potential soil liquefaction. The work included 800 stone columns installed along either side of the bridge for ground improvement. Richmond, about one metre (3.3 ft) above sea level, requires drainage and flood protection. To this end, Grauer Road was raised to 4.7m, which would handle a one-metre rise in sea level. At the road perimeter, the installation of a buried steel sheet pile wall will ensure the bridge piers remain flexible in a seismic event. The road base comprises pumice for light weight and drainage. The project was completed in 2014 for the opening of the McArthurGlen outlet mall.

With completion of the north runway in 1996, which was primarily used for landings, signs were installed that warned bridge traffic of low flying aircraft.

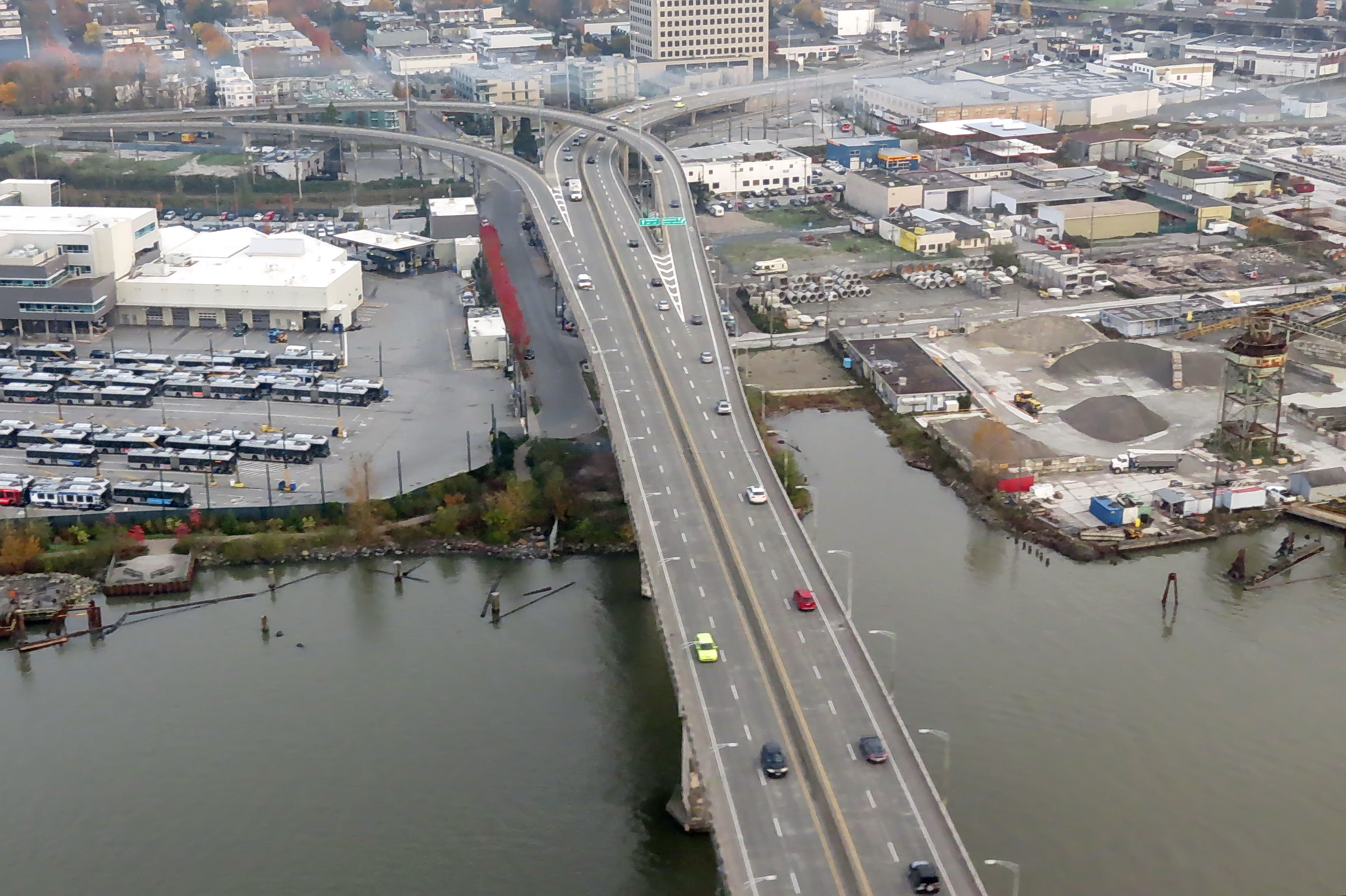
Arthur Laing Bridge, northward to Vancouver, 2014

In 2006, YVR floated a proposal that the bridge be restricted to airport traffic, which provoked a hostile reaction from Richmond city councillors.

In 2008, Translink added a bus lane on Russ Baker Way, between Gilbert Road and Cessna Drive. To respond to 127 crashes each year on the bridge, camera monitoring was added and a tow truck stationed at the south end of the bridge during morning rush hour.

In 2014, the adjustment of vehicle lane widths allowed bike-lane widening to improve safety for cyclists.

== See also ==
- List of crossings of the Fraser River
- List of BC bridges
