= Yellowhead Bridge (Prince George, British Columbia) =

Bridge in British Columbia, Canada

- Coordinates: 53°54′36.1″N 122°43′23.9″W
- Carries: Highway 16
- Crosses: Fraser River
- Locale: Prince George, British Columbia
- Owner: Province of British Columbia

Characteristics
- Material: Concrete
- Total length: 500 metres (1,600 ft)

History
- Construction end: 1988
- Opened: 1988

Statistics
- Toll: None

Location
- Interactive map of Yellowhead Bridge

The Yellowhead Bridge is a road bridge in Prince George, British Columbia. Designed by Sharlie Huffman, it carries Highway 16 500 m (1,600 ft) over the Fraser River. It was completed in 1988.

== See also ==
- List of crossings of the Fraser River
- List of bridges in Canada
