= Oak Street Bridge =

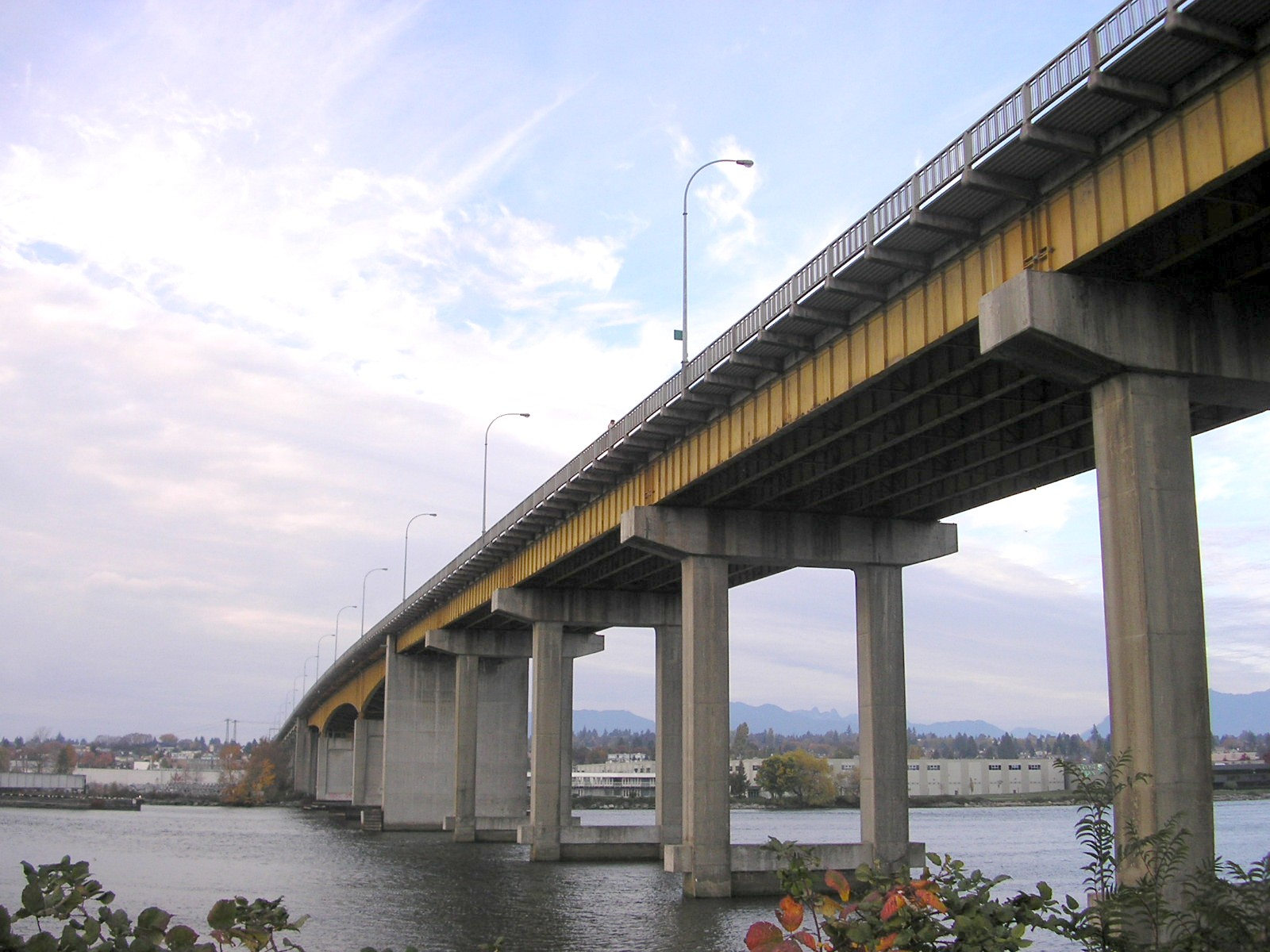
- Coordinates: 49°11′59″N 123°07′32″W
- Carries: Four lanes of British Columbia Highway 99, and pedestrians/bicycles
- Crosses: North Arm Fraser River
- Locale: Metro Vancouver
- Begins: Vancouver
- Ends: Richmond
- Owner: British Columbia Ministry of Transportation and Infrastructure

Characteristics
- Design: girder bridge

History
- Opened: June 29, 1957

Location
- Interactive map of Oak Street Bridge

The Oak Street Bridge is a crossing over the north arm of the Fraser River, the Canada Line, and several roads, in Metro Vancouver.

== History ==
=== Infrastructure ===
During the planning stage, it was known as the New Marpole Bridge, and steel plate girders salvaged from the second Granville Street Bridge made barges for constructing the foundations of the Oak St. Bridge.

Opened in June 1957, the same date as the Moray Bridge, these links replaced the Marpole Bridge (road). The new configuration created a more circuitous route between Vancouver and Vancouver International Airport (YVR), not restored until the Arthur Laing Bridge opened in 1975. Initially, the highway ended at No. 4 Rd, short of connecting with No. 5 Rd. and the Ladner Ferry. A primary objective was to create a fast route to the U.S. border, partially realized on the 1959 opening of the Deas Tunnel, and fully with the 1962 opening of Highway 99 to the border. A branch is connected to the new Tsawwassen ferry terminal.

Vancouver regarded the bridge as a source of unwanted traffic. Despite federal promises to share construction costs, the province ended up wholly financing the project. Costing about $9m, the structure is 1,839.2 metres (6,034 ft) long. The main spans comprise haunched (deeper at supports) steel girders, and the approaches are steel or concrete girders. The central heavy steel deck plate girders, continuous over three spans, measure 60.9 metres (200 ft), 91.4 metres (300 ft), and 60.9 metres (200 ft). The freeway standard of Highway 99 ends where the bridge joins the Vancouver surface street grid. Average daily crossings were 85,000 cars in 2000. Averaging 18,000 cars on opening, summer daily averages were 70,000 in 1970, 74,000 in 1975, and 71,000 in 1980.

The Ministry of Transportation and Infrastructure for BC owns and maintains this high-level, four-lane bridge. Cyclists are legally required to ride on the sidewalks.

=== Tolls ===
The premier announced that the 25-cent toll would remain for 12½ years to cover construction costs for both the Oak St. and Moray bridges. A week later, he revised this to two years, a promise not fulfilled. Initially, to avoid tolls, most traffic used the Fraser Street Bridge, causing massive congestion, leaving Oak St. Bridge underused. Toll plazas existed on Sea Island Way and on the highway south off the bridge.

On opening, the Deas Tunnel toll was 50 cents, but a combined tunnel/bridge ticket was 60 cents.

However, weekly tickets offered huge savings. A book of 24 tickets usable at each crossing cost $1.25, amended to $1 for 20 tickets from June 1960.

The premier announced that tolls would be lifted from all highways on April 1, 1964, but were removed at 7:30 pm the previous evening. George Massey, after whom the tunnel was renamed, and an outspoken opponent of the tolls, paid the final toll at the bridge that evening. The toll booths were removed, and the roadway narrowed accordingly.

Later, the Coquihalla Highway had staffed toll booths (1986–2008), and electronic tolling operated on the new Golden Ears (2009–2017), and Port Mann (2012–2017) bridges.

=== Maintenance, upgrades and incidents ===
During the morning rush hour of November 27, 1959, heavy fog and road ice caused pileups that damaged 150 cars. The largest involved 35 cars, the next 23 and the third 18. Seven people went to hospital.

In 1964, a driver, who suffered stroke, plunged off the south end. Sustaining minor injuries from the accident, he died in hospital.

The Oak St. Bridge/Highway 99 interchange with Bridgeport Rd./Sea Island Way was modified in 1969–70, and 2001. Despite extensive work on the bridge deck expansion joints in 1973–74, they were rebuilt during 1976–78, and the deck repaved. In 1980–81, major pier protection system was installed.

In 1995, owing to extensive deterioration of the bridge deck and precast sidewalk panels, two lanes were closed alternately for resurfacing the deck with a high performance concrete, followed by a waterproof membrane, and asphalt. Recent traffic accidents that highlighted important safety deficiencies prompted the installation of no-posts at the median and curbs. The deck joints were again replaced, and deteriorated concrete on the bridge underside removed and patched.

The cast-in-place concrete girders of the southern approach were vulnerable to collapse from movements during soil liquefaction. To strengthen the under-reinforced girders, glass fibre reinforced polymer wraps, the most flexible of possible composites, were chosen. Installed over four separate contracts, the seismic retrofit was completed in 2002.

=== Neighbourhood redevelopment ===
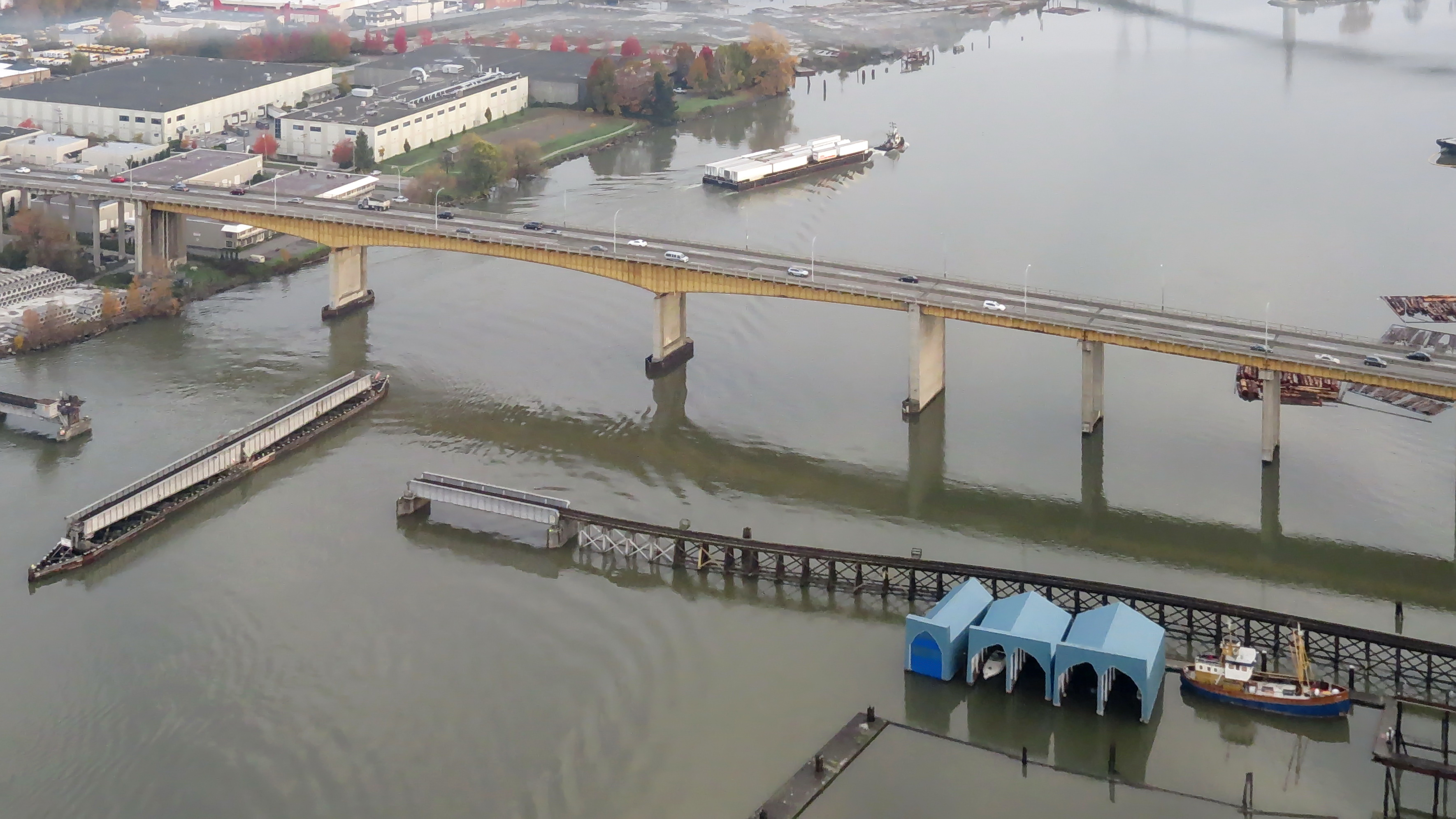
Northeastward, CP Rail Bridge in foreground, Oak St. Bridge in background

After the bridge opened, more than 50 stores at Hudson and Marine Drive closed from lost business. Low-rise stucco apartments replaced older houses. Once the Arthur Laing Bridge opened, Granville Street developed as the commercial centre.

At the south end of the Oak St. Bridge, construction started in 1960 on the first hotel at the highway interchange. Opening in 1962, the 62-room motor inn, initially called Delport Inn, then Airport Inn, was the birth of the Delta Hotels chain. Construction beginning in 1971, the 14-storey tower that opened the next year was the tallest building in Richmond. The project added 144 new suites, and included renovating and expanding the existing amenities. The property is now branded the Sandman Signature Hotel.

Other hotels built in the immediate vicinity, and their current branding, are the Abercorn Inn (1981), Travelodge Hotel (1984), Accent Inn (1988), and Sandman Hotel Airport (1999).

On cleared land hugging the east side of the southern approach, two midrise office buildings and two hotels are under construction. The Courtyard by Marriott and Residence Inn by Marriott brand hotels will provide 201 rooms.

== See also ==
- List of crossings of the Fraser River
- List of BC bridges
