= Grant McConachie Way =

Expressway in Richmond and Vancouver, British Columbia, Canada

- Grant McConachie Way highlighted in red.
- Maintained by: the Vancouver Airport Authority
- Length: 3.7 km (2.3 mi)
- Location: Vancouver, Richmond
- East end: SW Marine Drive in Vancouver
- Major junctions: Russ Baker Way; Sea Island Way
- West end: Vancouver International Airport Terminal in Richmond

Construction
- Inauguration: 1960s

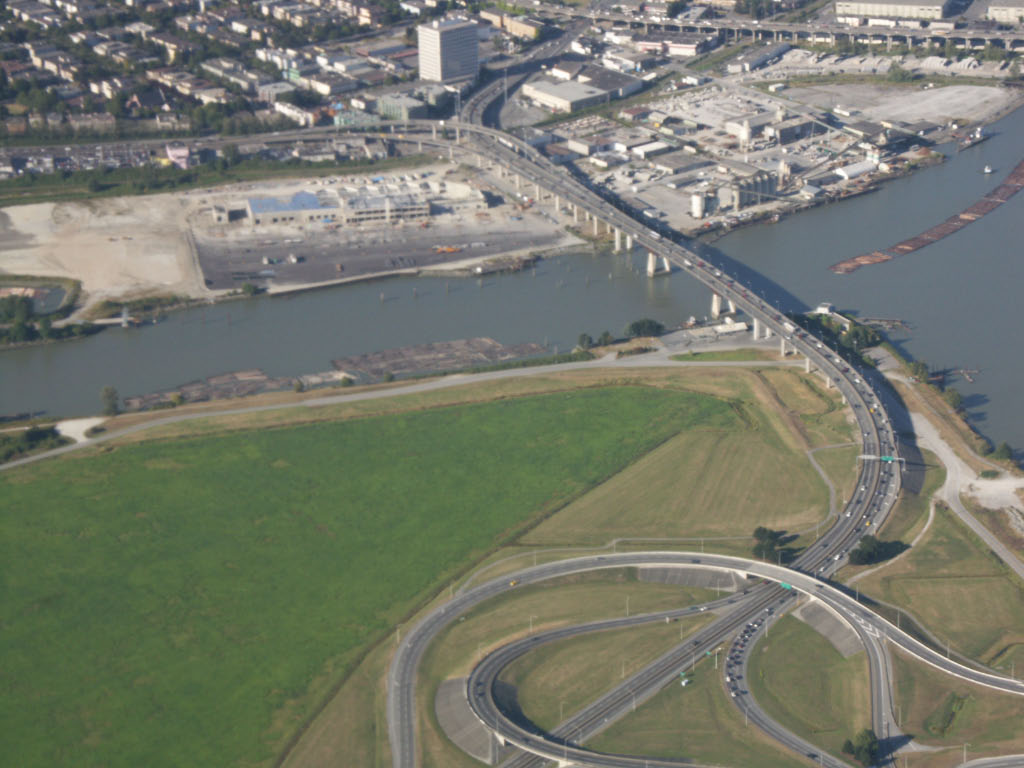
Aerial photograph eastern portion of Grant McConachie Way.

Grant McConachie Way is a three-to-six lane arterial route and thoroughfare in Richmond and Vancouver, British Columbia, Canada. Named for aviator Grant McConachie, it is the primary access road into Vancouver International Airport on Sea Island. It is also one of the three roads entering Vancouver from the south, along with Knight Street and Oak Street. Upon entering Vancouver, the road becomes Southwest Marine Drive.

The road crosses the Arthur Laing Bridge over the North Arm Fraser River. Its east-west alignment on Sea Island between the Arthur Laing Bridge and the airport is closely paralleled by SkyTrain's Canada Line. In 2001, interchange improvements were made to provide better access.

While there are at-grade intersections on the route, there have been some talks by YVR to potentially convert the Templeton Street intersection into a proper freeway-like interchange.

== Major intersections ==
Location	km	mi	Destinations	Notes
Vancouver	0.0	0.0	Granville Street (Highway 99 north) / Southwest Marine Drive – City Centre	Y-interchange
Vancouver–Richmond boundary	0.3– 0.8	0.19– 0.50	Arthur Laing Bridge crosses the North Arm Fraser River	
Richmond	1.2	0.75	Russ Baker Way – YVR South Terminal, Richmond	Interchange; no eastbound exit
Richmond	1.7	1.1	Sea Island Way (Highway 901:2923 east) to Highway 99 / Highway 91 – Vancouver, New Westminster, Delta, Surrey	Interchange; eastbound exit and westbound entrance
Richmond	1.9	1.2	Templeton Street – Designer Outlet Centre	At-grade; eastbound access to Russ Baker Way; access to Templeton station
Richmond	2.3	1.4	Miller Road	At-grade; near Sea Island Centre station
Richmond	3.0	1.9	Aviation Avenue	At-grade
Richmond	3.4	2.1	U-turn	Eastbound only; one-way transition
Richmond	3.7	2.3	Vancouver International Airport main terminal	Grant McConachie Way passes through the terminal and returns eastbound
1.000 mi = 1.609 km; 1.000 km = 0.621 mi: Incomplete access
