= Lulu Island =

Island of the Fraser River in British Columbia, Canada

- Location within British Columbia
- Interactive map of Lulu Island

Geography
- Location: Fraser River
- Coordinates: 49°10′05″N 123°04′50″W
- Area: 122.4 km^{2} (47.3 sq mi)

Administration
- Canada
- Province: British Columbia
- City: Richmond; New Westminster (Queensborough)

Demographics
- Population: 206,216 (2016)

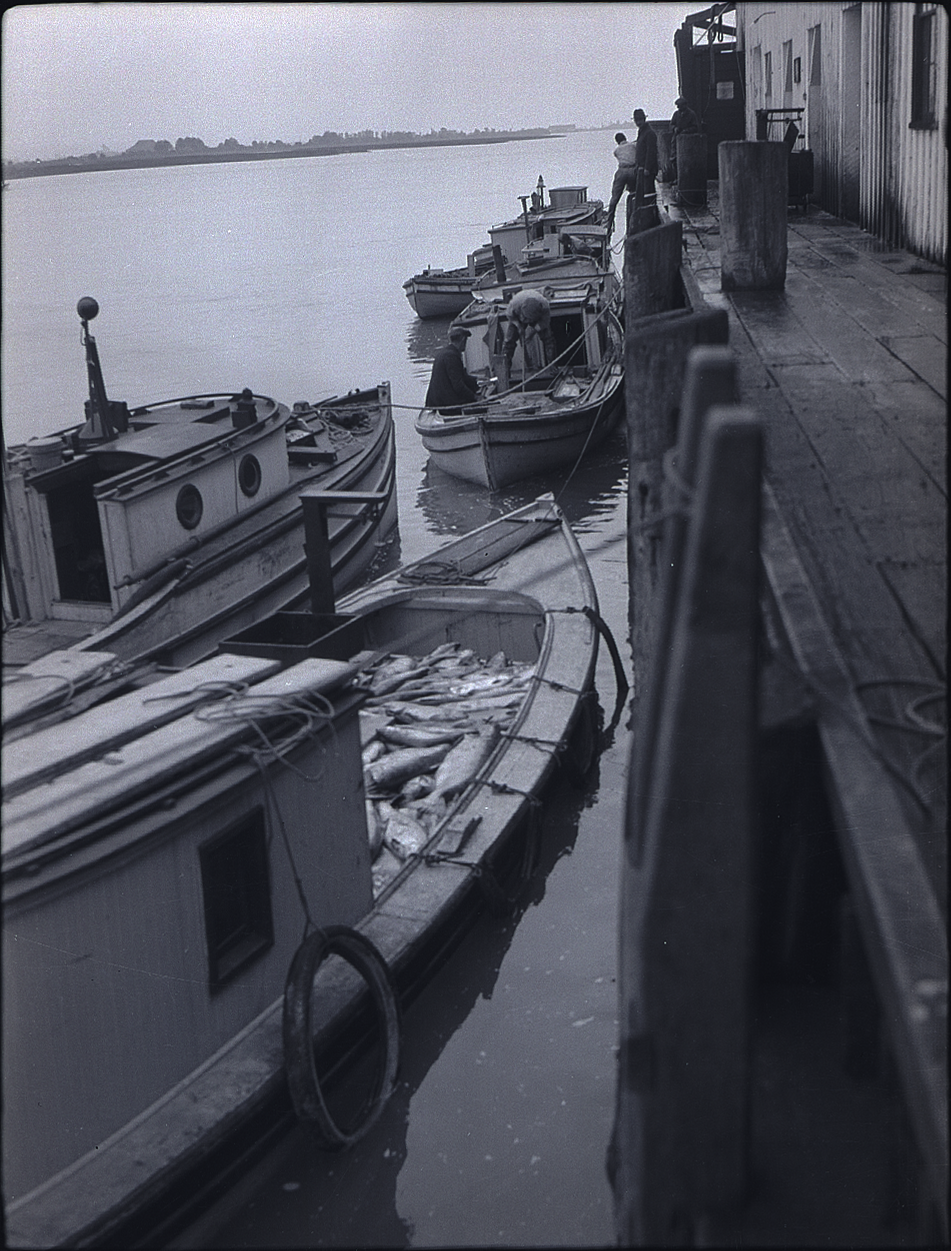
Salmon fishing boats, Lulu Island, August, 1927

Lulu Island is an estuary island in the Fraser River delta of southern British Columbia, Canada, located south of the western half of the Burrard Peninsula, where the city of Vancouver is located. It is the largest island of the Lower Mainland region, and the second-most populous island in British Columbia, after Vancouver Island. The city of Richmond occupies most of the island, while a small section at the eastern tip, known as Queensborough, is part of the city of New Westminster.

Lulu Island is situated between the two principal distributaries of the Lower Fraser River, known as the North Arm and South Arm. A further distributary, known as the Middle Arm, splits of the left bank of the North Arm just downstream of the Oak Street Bridge and separates the island from Sea Island to its northwest, where the Vancouver International Airport is located. At the western edge of Lulu Island lies Sturgeon Bank, a large sandbank which falls off into the Strait of Georgia on its western edge. The island is also neighbored by the Mitchell Island to its north; the islands of Annacis, Poplar, Don and Lion are to its east; and the Delta Peninsula and the islands of Deas, Kirkland, Gunn, Barber, Reifel and Westham to its south. Further upstream to the east are Douglas Island and Barnston Island.

== History ==
Lulu Island was named in 1862 by Colonel Richard Clement Moody, after Lulu Sweet, a 16-year-old Hawaiian actress (b. c. 1844), from Victoria, with whom he toured the Fraser River.

The island enjoyed good connections to the new port city of Vancouver thanks to the Lulu Island & Steveston Railway line of the British Columbia Electric Railway, which began at what is today the north end of the Granville Street Bridge. The route of the Lulu Island Railway became known as the Arbutus Corridor, which runs west through Kitsilano before turning south to Kerrisdale and Marpole before crossing the north arm of the Fraser to reach Lulu Island and the City of Richmond. The Eburne swing bridge was removed in 2015, leaving remaining railroad tracks on the Richmond side of the river orphaned. The Arbutus Corridor tracks were removed in 2016 to create a greenway for cyclists and pedestrians.

The southwestern corner of Lulu Island is home to Steveston, a fishing port and former cannery town, home of the Gulf of Georgia Cannery and now a busy tourist centre that has a history interconnected with that of the Japanese-Canadians prior to their internment to the Interior during World War II.

== Geohazards ==
Because the island is composed partly of glacial silt brought down by the Fraser River, there is a fear of liquefaction of its sands if a tremor with sufficient intensity were to shake it. In such an eventuality, it is anticipated that localized areas, specifically in the vicinity of the present-day mouth of the Fraser River, could experience seismic liquefaction failure and collapse westward into the Strait of Georgia, potentially impacting the adjacent river entrainment works and possibly some navigational aids. Additionally, statically-triggered liquefaction failures have been documented in this area, highlighting the extremely loose localized soil conditions, as well as the high potential for associated slope instability and mass wasting.

The island is also fully diked to protect it from potential flooding during the annual spring freshet on the Fraser.
