= Dinsmore =

Dinsmore may refer to:

== Places and structures ==
- Dinsmore Airport (disambiguation)

=== Canada ===
- Dinsmore, Saskatchewan, a village
- Dinsmore Bridge, in Richmond, British Columbia

=== United States ===
- Dinsmore, California, an unincorporated community
- Dinsmore Township, Ohio
- Dinsmore, Texas, an unincorporated community
- Dinsmore Homestead, in Kentucky

== People ==
- Dinsmore (surname)
- Dinsmore Alter, (1888-1968), American astronomer and meteorologist

== Other uses ==
- Dinsmore & Shohl, American law firm
- Elsie Dinsmore, children's book series
