= Templeton station =

Metro Vancouver SkyTrain station

Templeton
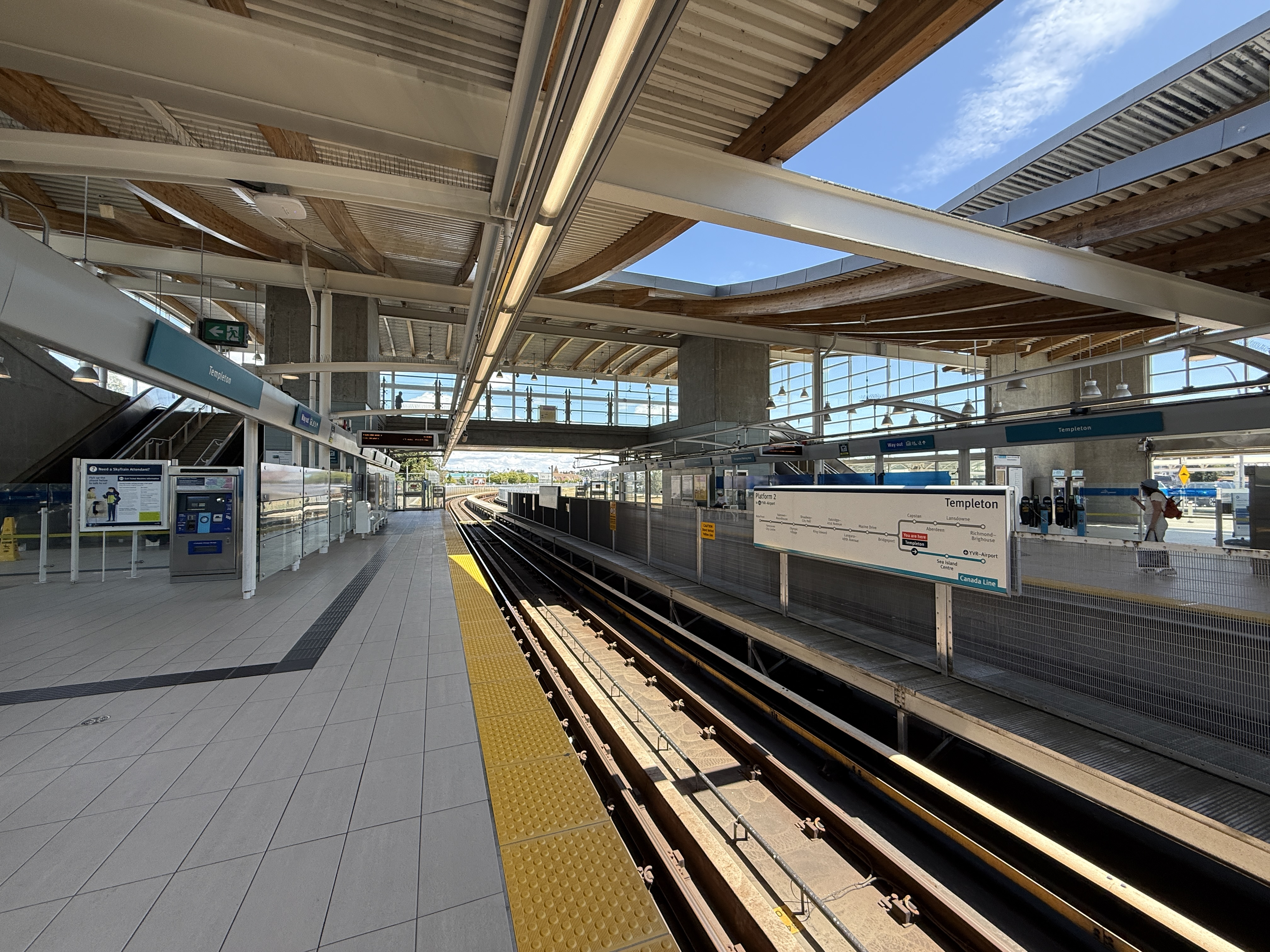
- Templeton station platform in 2026

General information
- Location: 7600 Grauer Road, Richmond
- Coordinates: 49°11′48″N 123°8′47″W
- System: SkyTrain station
- Owner: TransLink; Vancouver International Airport
- Platforms: Side platforms
- Tracks: 2

Construction
- Structure type: At grade
- Accessible: yes

Other information
- Station code: TM
- Fare zone: Zone 2

History
- Opened: August 17, 2009

Passengers
- 2025: 1,284,000 ▲0.5%
- Rank: 39 of 54

Services
Preceding station	TransLink	Following station
Bridgeport towards Waterfront	Canada Line Airport branch	Sea Island Centre towards YVR–Airport
Location

Templeton is an at-grade station on the Canada Line of Metro Vancouver's SkyTrain rapid transit system. The station is located in Richmond, British Columbia, south of the city of Vancouver, and is built on the Grauer Lands on the eastern portion of Sea Island.

The Vancouver International Airport Authority contributed up to $300 million toward the airport branch of the Canada Line, which includes Templeton. This station, along with Sea Island Centre, was built at-grade to allow for the future construction of an elevated aircraft taxiway over the Canada Line guideway.

== Services ==
Templeton station serves Vancouver International Airport's long term parking lot, as well as Burkeville, McArthurGlen Designer Outlet Vancouver Airport, offices, and light industrial space at the eastern end of Sea Island, providing direct rapid transit service to YVR and Downtown Vancouver. The station also provides the most direct access to Iona Island and Iona and McDonald Beach Regional Parks in the northwest, and to the YVR's south terminal in the southwest.

== Station information ==
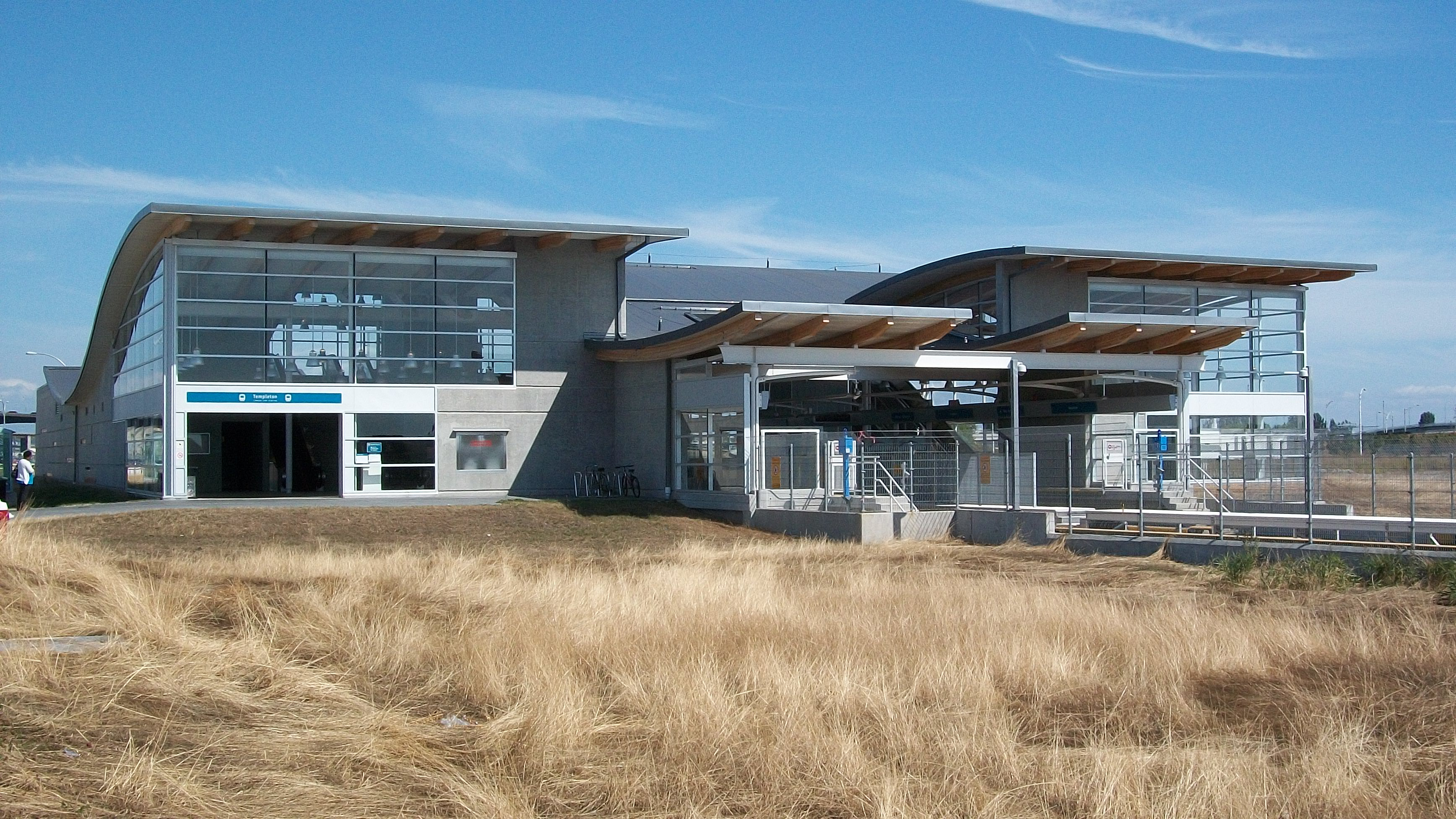
Pedestrian access is on the north side of the station.

=== Entrances ===
Templeton is served by two entrances. The northern entrance is adjacent to Templeton Station Road, and provides access to the McArthurGlen Designer Outlet Vancouver Airport. The southern entrance is adjacent to a large parking lot.

=== Airport surcharge ===
As with all stations on Sea Island—YVR–Airport, Sea Island Centre, and Templeton—a $5.00 surcharge, the "YVR AddFare", applies to fares paid with cash, with Compass Card stored value, or with DayPasses purchased at the station for eastbound trips originating from this station to Bridgeport station or beyond. Trips using a monthly pass are exempt, as are trips using DayPasses purchased and activated off Sea Island. Trips to Templeton are not subject to the surcharge. Travel between YVR–Airport, Sea Island Centre, and Templeton stations is free.

== Future services ==
In its 20-year master plan developed in 2007, YVR identified the possibilities of locating certain terminal facilities (such as passenger and baggage check-in) at the station in order to relieve congestion at existing terminal curbside spaces, and providing new long-term public and employee parking near the station. Self-service passenger check-in kiosks have been installed at Templeton station, alongside several other stations on the Canada Line.
