= Sea Island Centre station =

Metro Vancouver SkyTrain station

Sea Island Centre
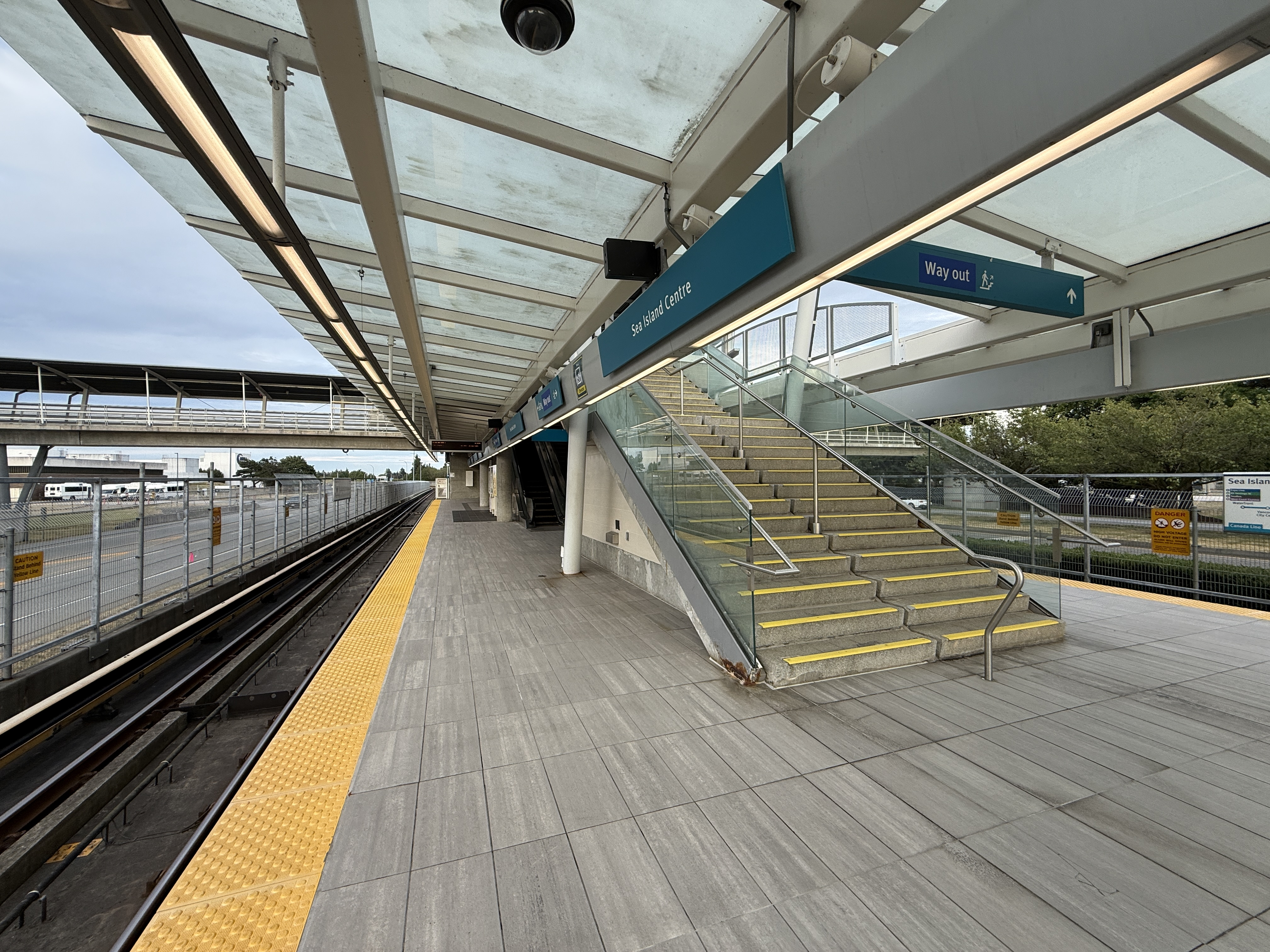
- Sea Island station platform in 2026

General information
- Location: 5899 Grant McConachie Way, Richmond, BC
- Coordinates: 49°11′35″N 123°9′29″W
- System: SkyTrain station
- Owner: TransLink; Vancouver International Airport
- Platforms: Centre platform
- Tracks: 2

Construction
- Structure type: At grade
- Accessible: yes

Other information
- Station code: SI
- Fare zone: Zone 2

History
- Opened: August 17, 2009

Passengers
- 2025: 346,000 ▲7.1%
- Rank: 53 of 54

Services
Preceding station	TransLink	Following station
Templeton towards Waterfront	Canada Line Airport branch	YVR–Airport Terminus
Location

Sea Island Centre is an at-grade station on the Canada Line of Metro Vancouver's SkyTrain rapid transit system. The station is located on Sea Island in Richmond, British Columbia.

The Vancouver International Airport Authority contributed up to $300 million toward the airport branch of the Canada Line, which includes Sea Island Centre. This station, along with Templeton, was built at-grade to allow for the future construction of an elevated aircraft taxiway over the Canada Line guideway.

== Services ==
Sea Island Centre station serves Vancouver International Airport (YVR), and airline-related industrial area along Grant McConachie Way, east of the airport. During off hours, the station is served by the N10 bus route, which provides service to Downtown Vancouver and Richmond–Brighouse station.

== Station information ==
=== Entrances ===
Sea Island Centre is served by two entrances. The northern entrance is located adjacent to the North Service Road, it provides access to an Air Canada hangar as well as other airport-related businesses. Parking lots for airport employees is also located at this entrance. The southern entrance is located on Miller Road.

=== Airport surcharge ===
As with all stations on Sea Island—YVR–Airport, Sea Island Centre, and Templeton—a $5.00 surcharge, the "YVR AddFare", applies to fares paid with cash, with Compass Card stored value, or with DayPasses purchased at the station for eastbound trips originating from this station to Bridgeport station or beyond. Trips using a monthly pass are exempt, as are trips using DayPasses purchased and activated off Sea Island. Trips to Sea Island Centre are not subject to the surcharge. Travel between YVR–Airport, Sea Island Centre, and Templeton stations is free.

== Image gallery ==
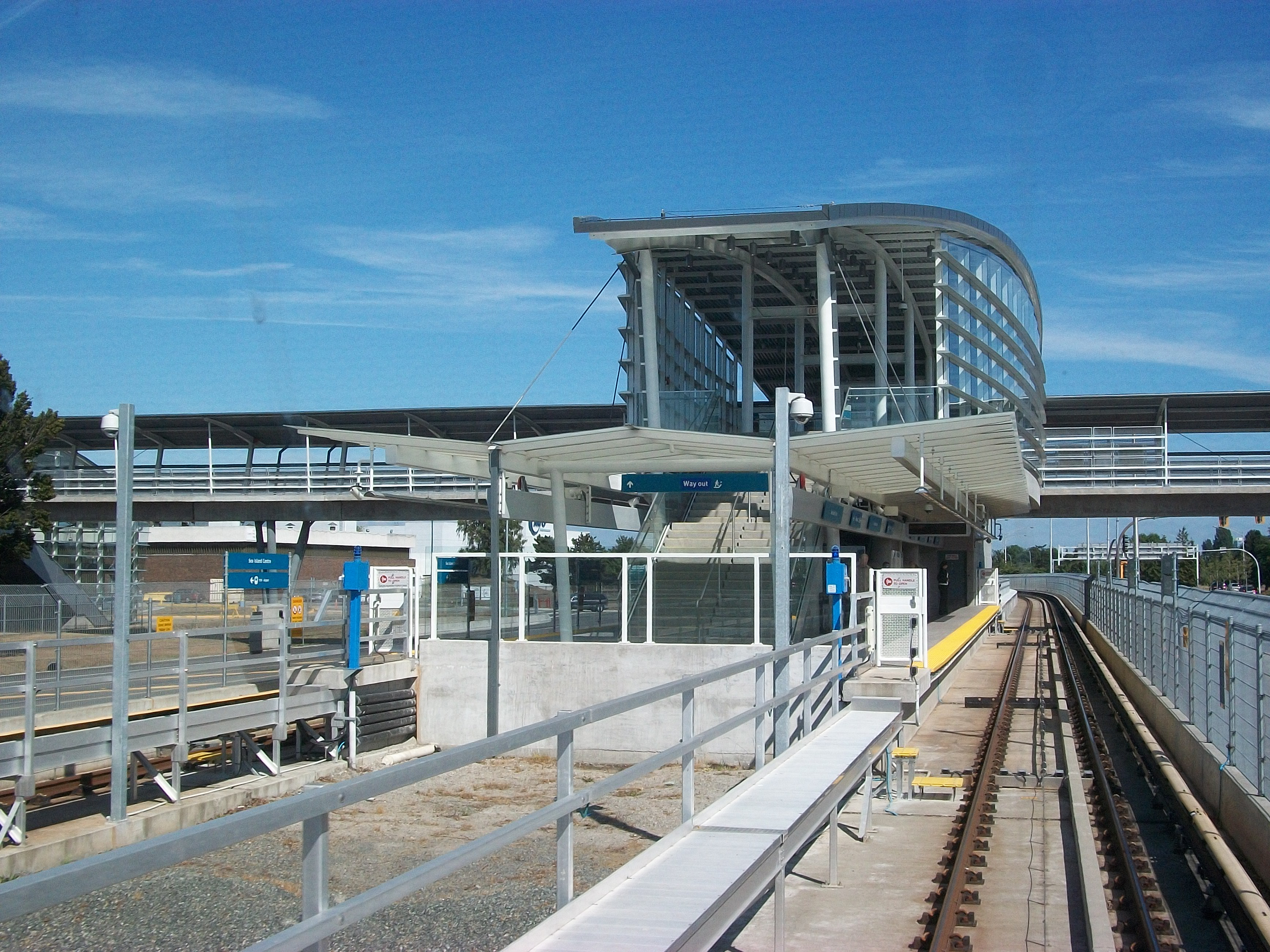
Approaching Sea Island Centre station from the west. Access to the station is via an elevated walkway above the tracks and adjacent roads.

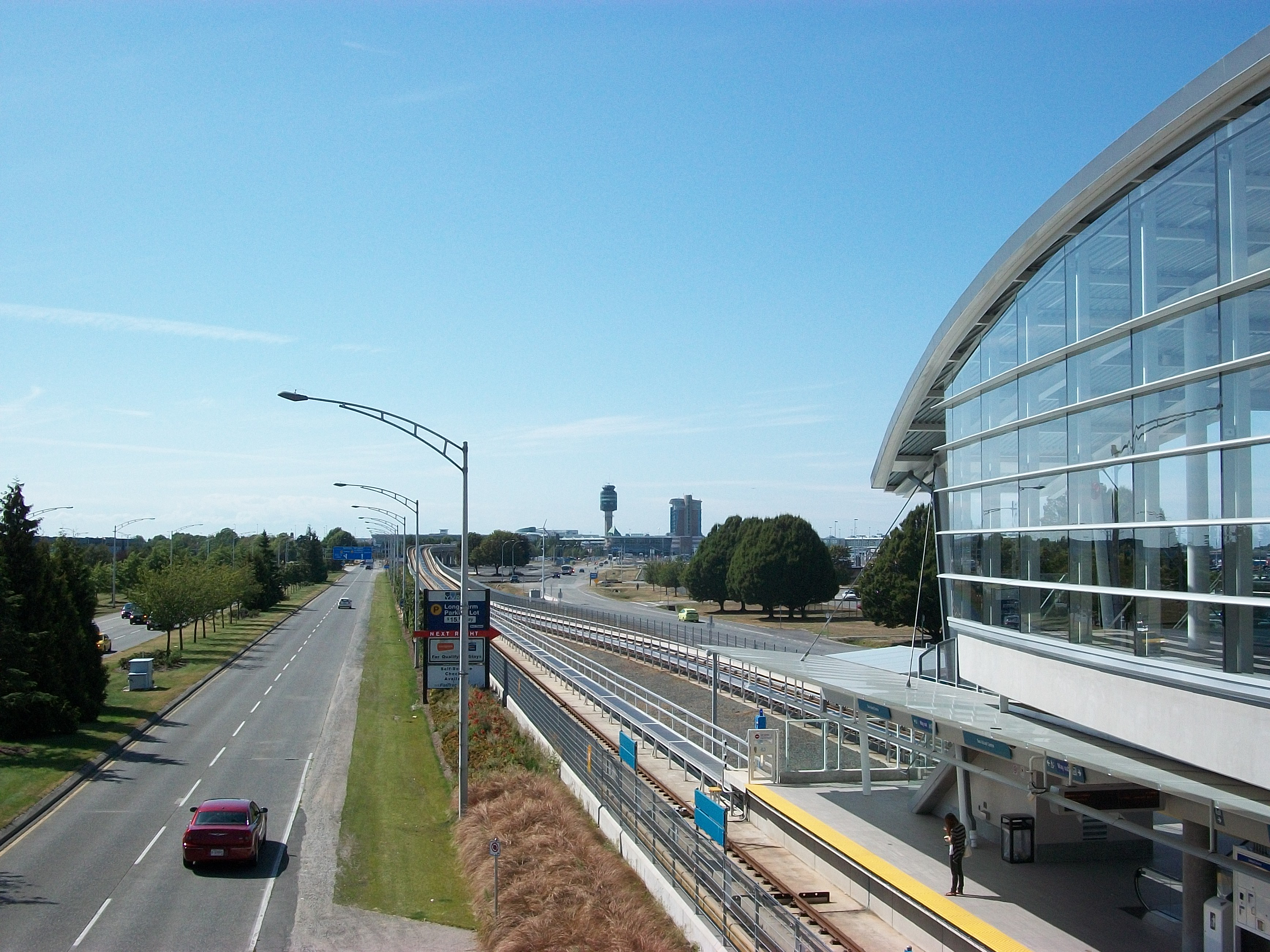
Sea Island Centre station and Grant McConachie Way, with airport control tower visible in the distance
