= D63 =

D63 may refer to:

- INS Kolkata (D63), an active Indian guided missile destroyer of Kolkata class
- HMS Verity (D63), a Biitish Royal Navy Second World War Convoy Defence ship
- Greek destroyer Navarinon (D63), a Greek Navy ship transferred on 27 September 1962
- Greek destroyer Niki (D63), a Greek Navy ship
- Spanish destroyer Mendez Nunez (D63), a Spanish Navy ship transferred on 17 May 1978
- Dinsmore Airport (California) FAA LID
- a road in Dubai
