= Burkeville =

Burkeville can refer to:

- Burkeville, Texas
- Burkeville, Virginia
- Burkeville, British Columbia
