= McArthurGlen Designer Outlet Vancouver Airport =

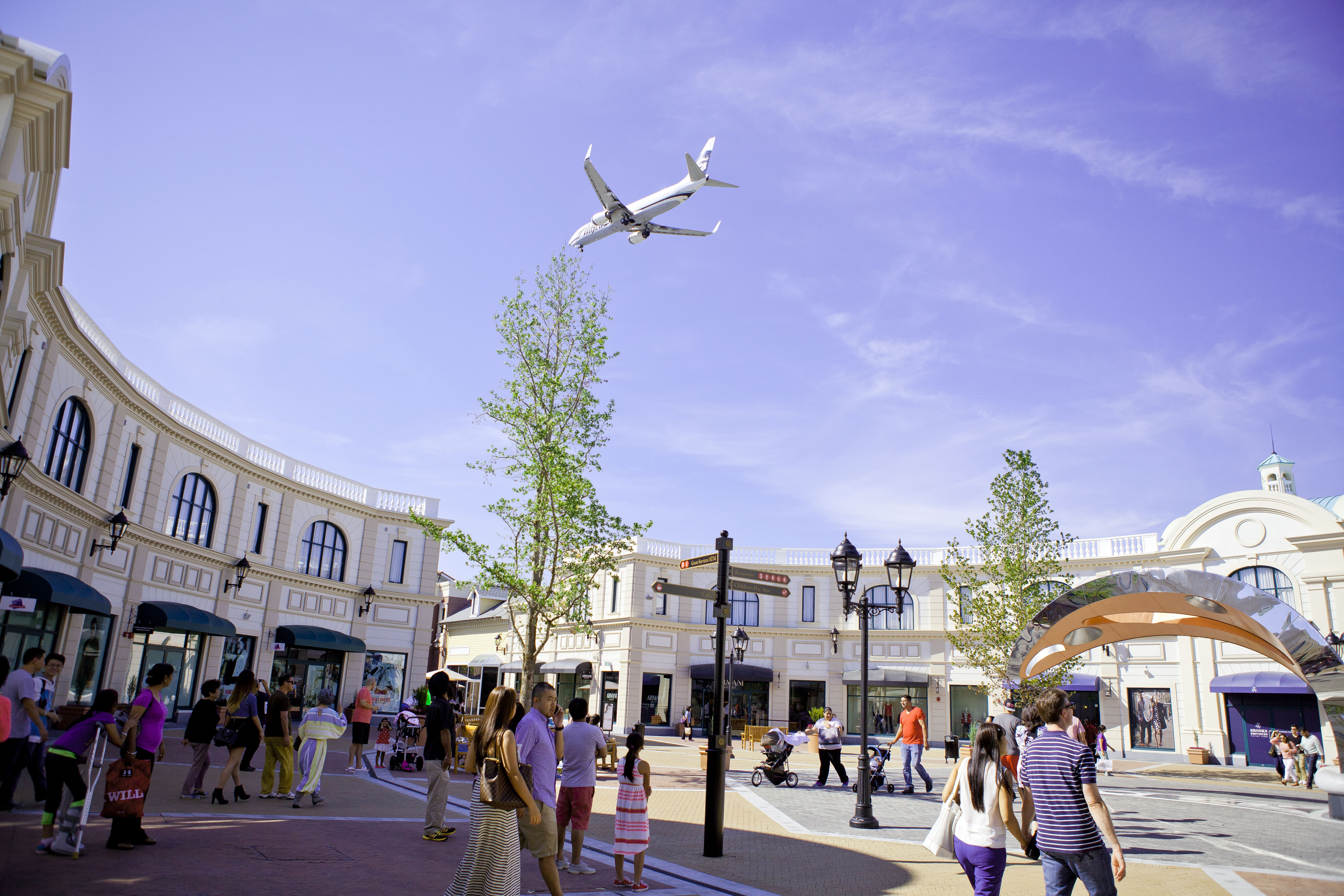
- McArthurGlen Vancouver piazza
- Location: Richmond, British Columbia, Canada
- Coordinates: 49°11′51″N 123°08′26″W
- Opened: Phase 1: July 9, 2015; Phase 2: August 29, 2019; Phase 3: TBA
- Manager: Robert Thurlow, General Manager
- Owner: McArthurGlen Group (50%); Vancouver Airport Authority (50%)
- Architect: Stantec
- Num. of stores: approximately 80
- Floor area: 340,000 square feet (32,000 m^{2})
- Floors: 2 (Second floor for Ralph Polo Lauren, Old Navy Outlet and washrooms only)
- Parking: 2,000 parking spaces
- Public transit: Templeton
- Website: Official website

McArthurGlen Designer Outlet Vancouver Airport (commonly known as McArthurGlen Vancouver) is an outlet mall on Sea Island in Richmond, British Columbia. It is located in close proximity to Vancouver International Airport. It currently has around 80 retailers over 340,000 square feet.

== Layout ==
McArthurGlen Vancouver Airport is an outdoor outlet lined with three horizontal pedestrian paths and three vertical pedestrian paths, which when intersected creates piazzas. The dining areas are located in the southeast corner of the outlet.

A phase two planned to open in 2018 was expected to expand the mall to 400,000 square feet and up to 150 retailers. However, the expansion was later scaled back to 84,000 square feet, eventually opening on August 29, 2019, just before the Labour Day weekend. Phase two was built to be integrated into the existing outlet centre, expanding on the European village theme to create one additional piazza.

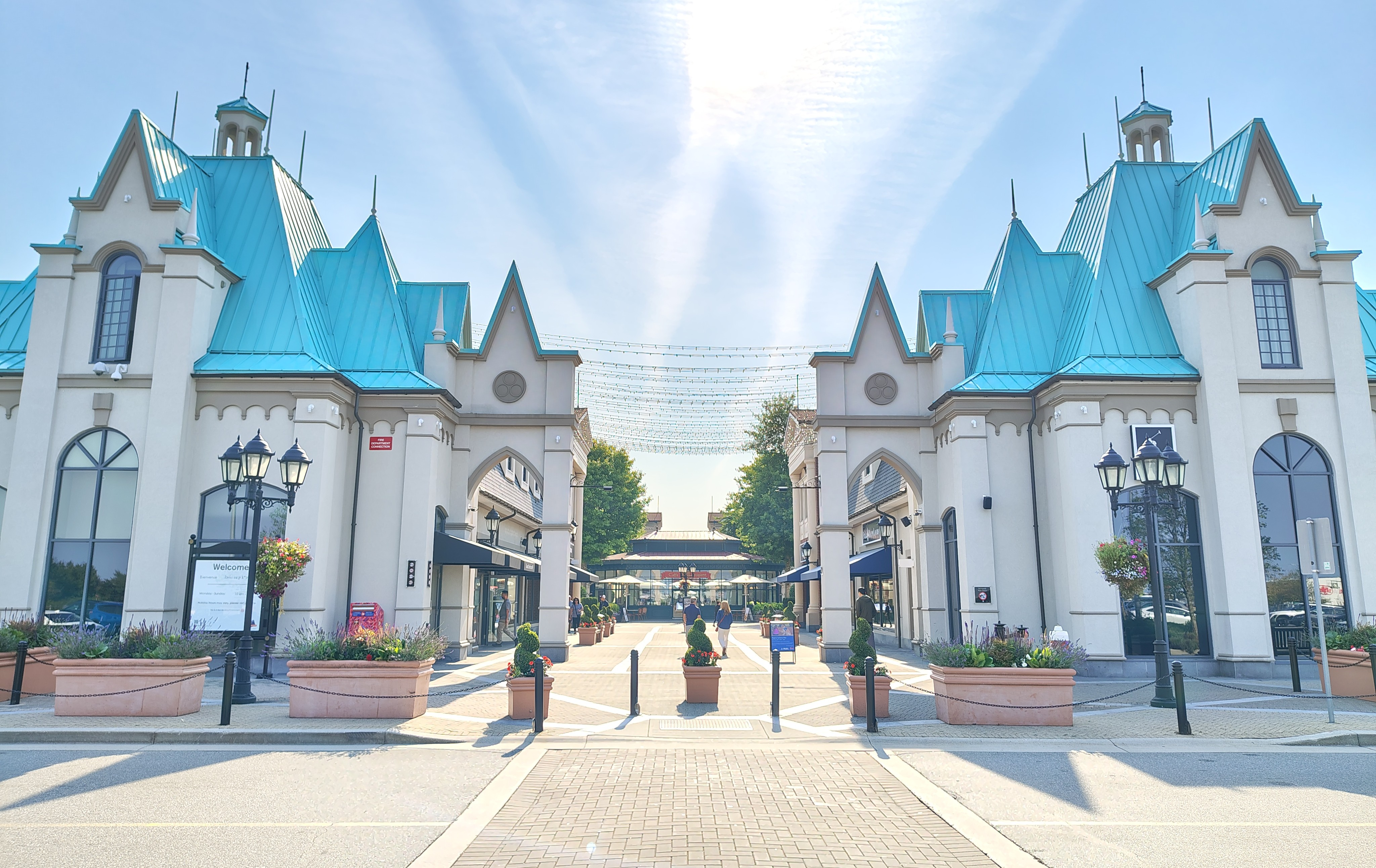
McArthurGlen Vancouver main entrance

The parking lot is single-levelled and spans from Templeton Street down to the west end of the outlet, providing 2,000 parking spaces.

== Transportation ==
The outlet mall is served by the Templeton station on the airport branch of the Canada Line. Visitors can travel for free, both ways, between Vancouver Airport and the Mall by selecting a "Sea Island Only" ticket at the train stations.
