= YVR–Airport station =

Metro Vancouver SkyTrain station

YVR–Airport
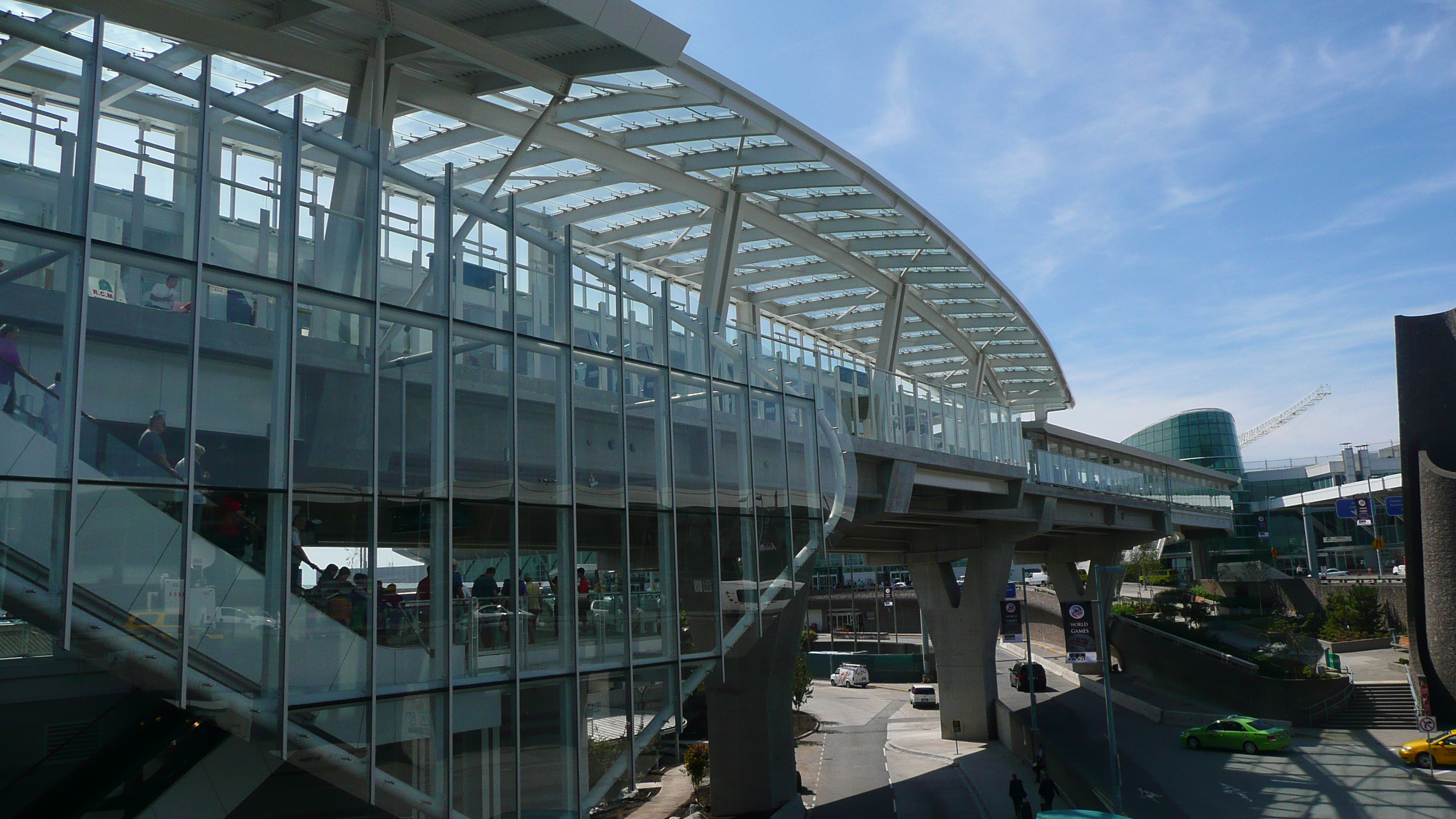

General information
- Location: 3600 Grant McConachie Way, Richmond
- Coordinates: 49°11′39″N 123°10′42″W
- Elevation: 18 m (59 ft) above ground
- System: SkyTrain station
- Owner: TransLink; Vancouver International Airport
- Platforms: Side platform
- Tracks: 1

Construction
- Structure type: Elevated
- Accessible: yes

Other information
- Station code: AP
- Fare zone: Zone 2, with airport surcharge

History
- Opened: August 17, 2009

Passengers
- 2025: 3,023,000 ▲3.5%
- Rank: 22 of 54

Services
Preceding station	TransLink	Following station
Sea Island Centre towards Waterfront	Canada Line Airport branch	Terminus
Location

YVR–Airport is an elevated metro station located on Sea Island within Richmond, British Columbia. It is one of the southbound termini of the SkyTrain system's Canada Line (the other southbound terminus being Richmond–Brighouse). The station is located within the main terminal at Vancouver International Airport. The station provides access to downtown Vancouver and the surrounding metropolitan area. During times when SkyTrain service is unavailable, the station is served by the N10 bus route, which provides service to downtown Vancouver and Richmond–Brighouse. Like Richmond–Brighouse, YVR–Airport only has a single track.

SkyTrain service to the station began on August 17, 2009, along with the rest of the Canada Line. The Vancouver International Airport Authority contributed up to $300 million toward the airport branch of the Canada Line, which includes YVR–Airport. The station replaced the previous Airport station, a bus exchange on Lulu Island that was closed in September 2009.

== Construction and opening ==
Construction of a rail link to the airport began in June 2005, when the Vancouver International Airport Authority began a project to expand the airport. Besides including other improvements such as nine new aircraft gates, the plan also included a building to link the domestic and international terminals (which are both now known simply as the main terminal). This building would serve as the location for the YVR–Airport station upon its opening. This expansion was completed two years later in June 2007. The project was completed ahead of schedule and under budget.

Simultaneously, TransLink began construction of the YVR branch of the Canada Line, which included YVR–Airport. This construction was done in three parts: an elevated branch from Highway 99 to Templeton was constructed from February 2006 to April 2007, an at-grade portion from Templeton to the unbuilt YVR Terminal 3 station (then called "Future YVR 3") was constructed from March 2006 to June 2007, and another elevated portion from YVR Terminal 3 to YVR–Airport was constructed from February 2006 to July 2007, respectively. TransLink announced the name of the station in May 2006, along with all of the other stations on the Canada Line. After construction wound down in 2007, and after the Sea Island portion of the Canada Line was used as a test track, the station opened with the rest of Canada Line 3 months ahead of schedule on August 17, 2009, featuring an art fixture by Susan Point, a member of the Musqueam First Nation. The art piece is meant to depict life in the Fraser River area prior to colonization and urbanization.

== Station information ==
=== Entrances ===
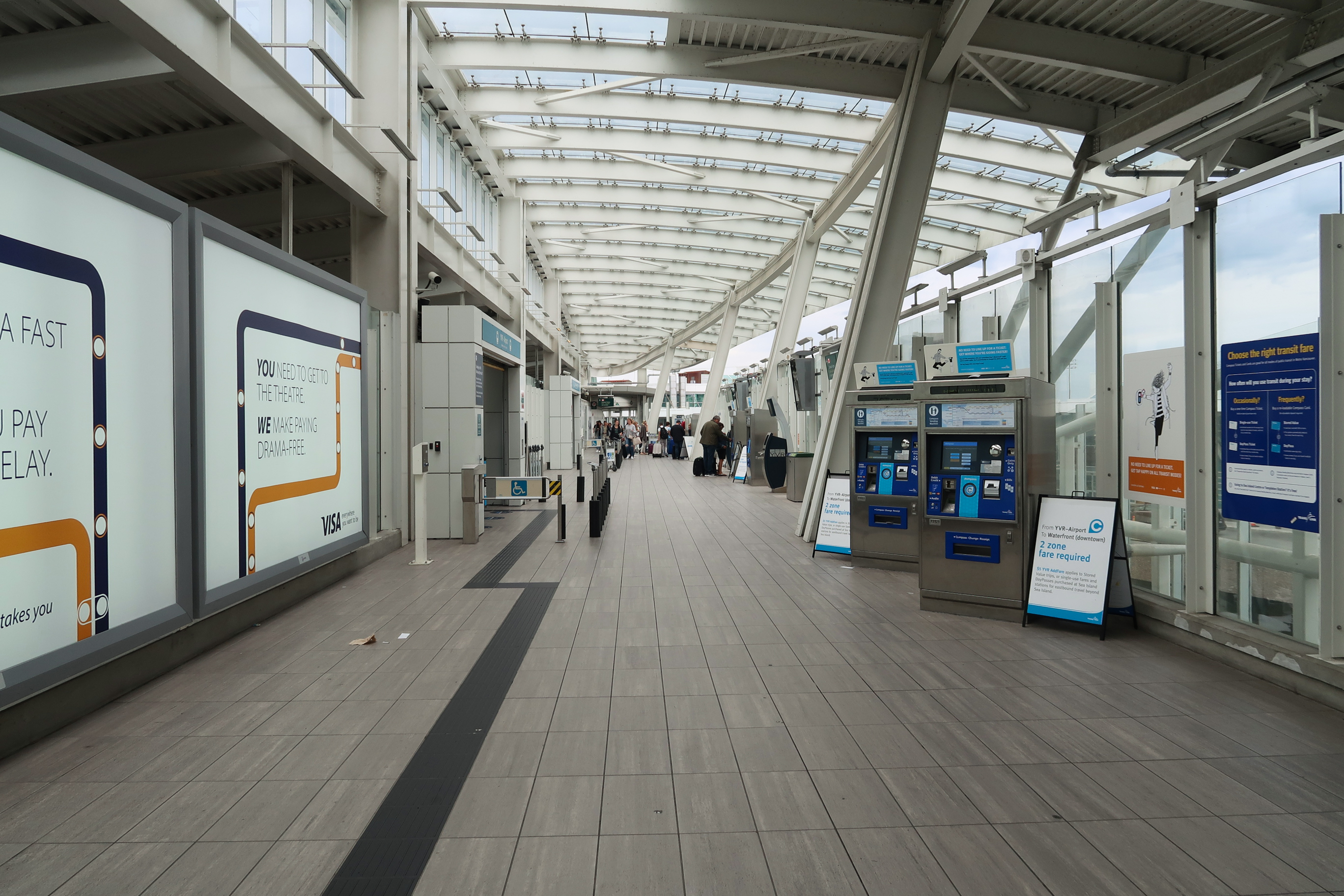
The ticketing concourse for the station, as seen in 2018

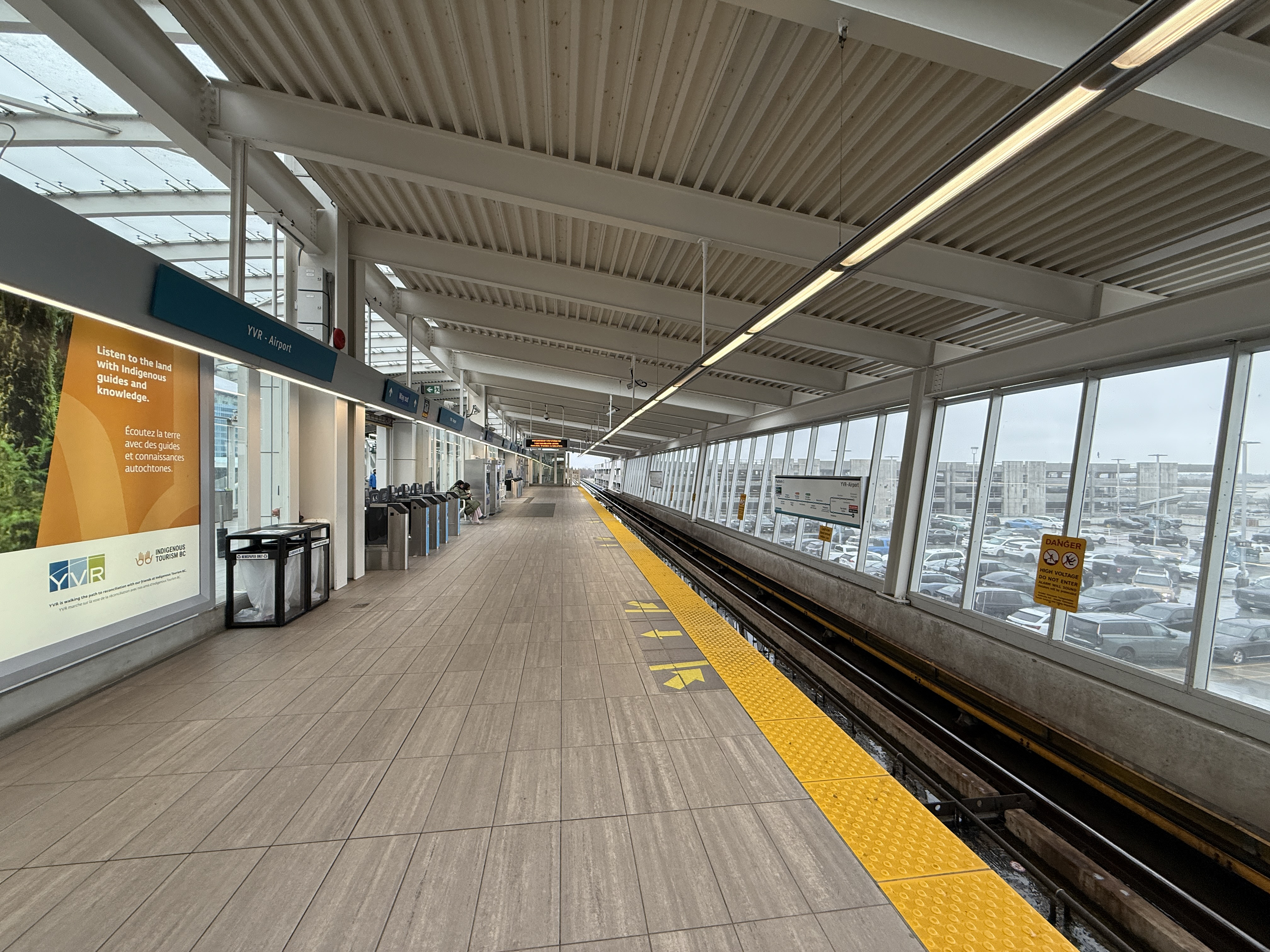
The single platform of the station, as seen in 2025

YVR–Airport is served by two entrances. These entrances are accessible via skybridge, and provide access to both the domestic and international sections of the airport's main terminal.

=== Airport surcharge ===
As with all stations on Sea Island, a surcharge, the YVR AddFare, applies to trips originating from this station except for trips that terminate within Sea Island. Trips using a monthly pass are exempt, as are trips using day passes purchased and activated off Sea Island. Trips to YVR–Airport are not subject to the surcharge. This practice began in 2010 as a means to generate more revenue for TransLink to cover the costs of the Canada Line. Prior to the introduction of the Compass Card in 2014, this charge only affected riders who paid in cash.

== Future ==
In 2007, the airport announced plans to build a second station serving the airport in its 20-year master plan. The station would be named YVR Terminal 3, and would serve the proposed Northeast Terminal expansion.
