= Bridgeport station (SkyTrain) =

Metro Vancouver SkyTrain station

Bridgeport
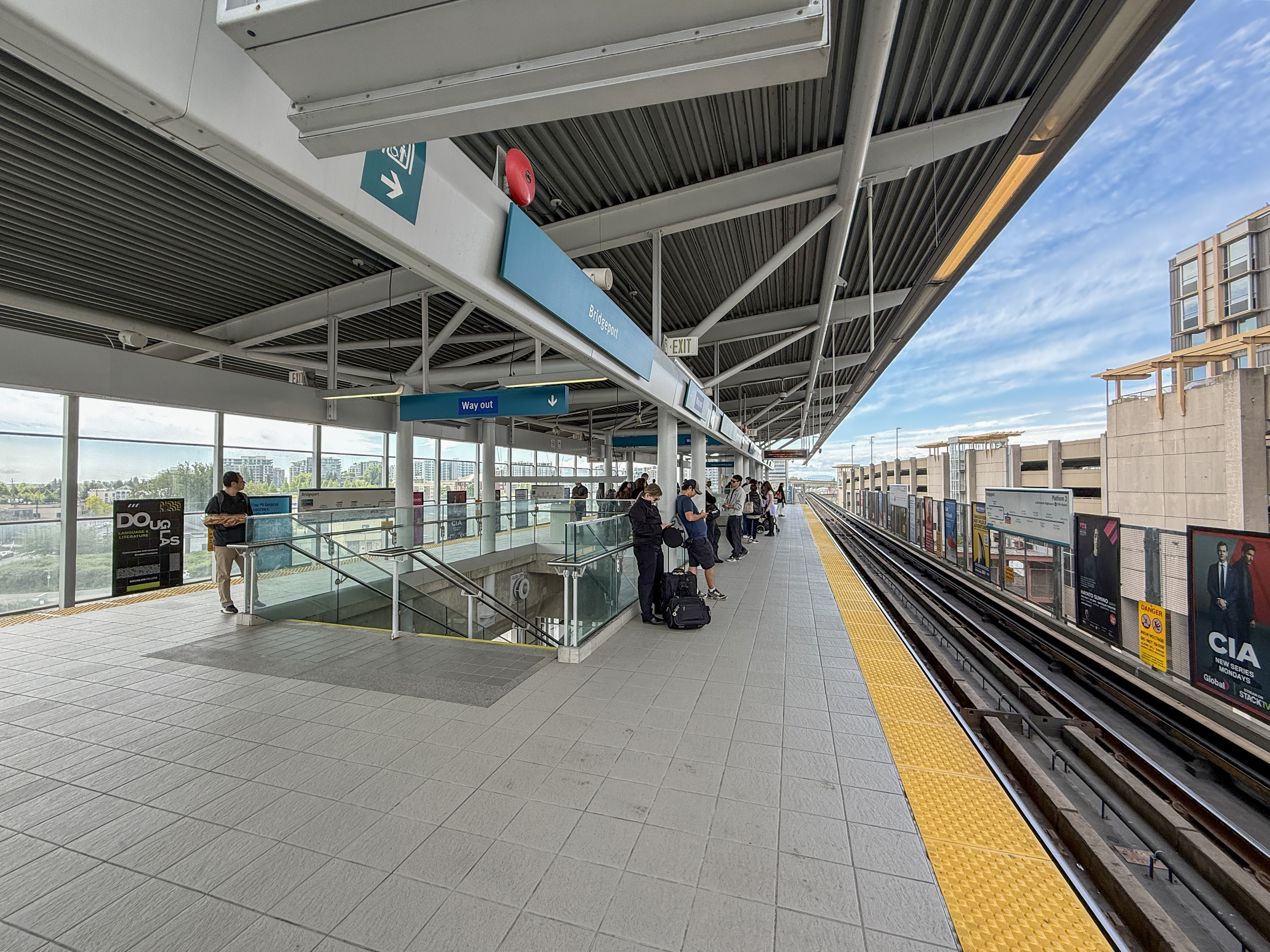

General information
- Location: 2211 Great Canadian Way, Richmond, BC
- Coordinates: 49°11′44″N 123°7′34″W
- System: SkyTrain station
- Owner: Vancouver International Airport, TransLink, Great Canadian Entertainment (park and ride)
- Platforms: Centre platform
- Tracks: 2

Construction
- Structure type: Elevated
- Parking: 580 space park and ride
- Accessible: yes

Other information
- Station code: BR
- Fare zone: 2

History
- Opened: August 17, 2009

Passengers
- 2025: 3,173,000 ▼3.5%
- Rank: 20 of 54

Services
| Preceding station | TransLink | Following station |
|---|---|---|
| Marine Drive towards Waterfront | Canada Line Airport branch | Templeton towards YVR–Airport |
| Marine Drive towards Waterfront | Canada Line Richmond branch | Capstan towards Richmond–Brighouse |
Location

Bridgeport is an elevated station on the Canada Line of Metro Vancouver's SkyTrain rapid transit system. It is located in Richmond, British Columbia, Canada, south of Vancouver. The Canada Line branches outbound at this station, with one branch heading westward to YVR–Airport station at the Vancouver International Airport and the other heading south to Richmond–Brighouse station in the commercial centre of Richmond.

== Location ==
Bridgeport station is located near the intersection of River Road and Great Canadian Way—north of Bridgeport Road and in the same general area as the River Rock Casino—and is the northernmost SkyTrain station in Richmond. The Canada Line's Operations and Maintenance Centre is located northeast of the station. There is a large park-and-ride facility adjacent to the station. The City of Richmond anticipates that the area surrounding this station will be heavily redeveloped, and proposals include the building of office suites, hotels and a bike parkade.

== Services ==
The Canada Line splits at the flying junction just southwest of Bridgeport station, with the main line continuing southward through Richmond to its terminus at Richmond–Brighouse station. A branch line heads westward across Sea Island to YVR–Airport station at the Vancouver International Airport. Passengers traveling between Richmond and Sea Island must transfer at Bridgeport to complete their journey. The station also serves local Richmond bus routes and is the inbound terminus for express buses from Delta, White Rock and the 620 bus from the Tsawwassen ferry terminal. In the past, prior to the opening of the Canada Line, the express buses coming from Delta and White Rock continued to Downtown Vancouver. This station occasionally serves as the inbound terminus for some Canada Line trains from Richmond–Brighouse and YVR–Airport during weekdays.

Bus bay assignments:

| Bay | Routes | Notes |
|---|---|---|
| 1 | Unloading only | |
| 2 | Unloading only | |
| 3 | 403 Three Road | |
| 3 | N10 Richmond–Brighouse Station | NightBus service |
| 4 | 430 Metrotown Station | Express |
| 4 | N10 Downtown | NightBus service |
| 5 | 407 Bridgeport | Via Vulcan during peak hours |
| 6 | 311 Scottsdale | Highway coach; PM peak only |
| 6 | 412 Sea Island South | No Sunday/holiday service |
| 7 | 601 South Delta | Highway coach |
| 8 | 602 Tsawwassen Heights; 603 Beach Grove; 604 English Bluff | Highway coach; PM peak only |
| 9 | 351 White Rock Centre | Highway coach |
| 10 | 352 Ocean Park; 354 White Rock South | Highway coach; PM peak only |
| 11 | 407 Gilbert | |
| 11 | 430 Richmond–Brighouse Station | Express |
| 12 | 620 Tsawwassen Ferry | Express; Via Ladner Exchange; Uses 18.3-metre (60 ft) articulated buses or double decker buses |
| 13 | 900 Bike Bus to Tsawwassen Ferry | Seasonal service: runs on Fridays, weekends and holidays; Via Ladner Exchange; Express |

== Gallery ==
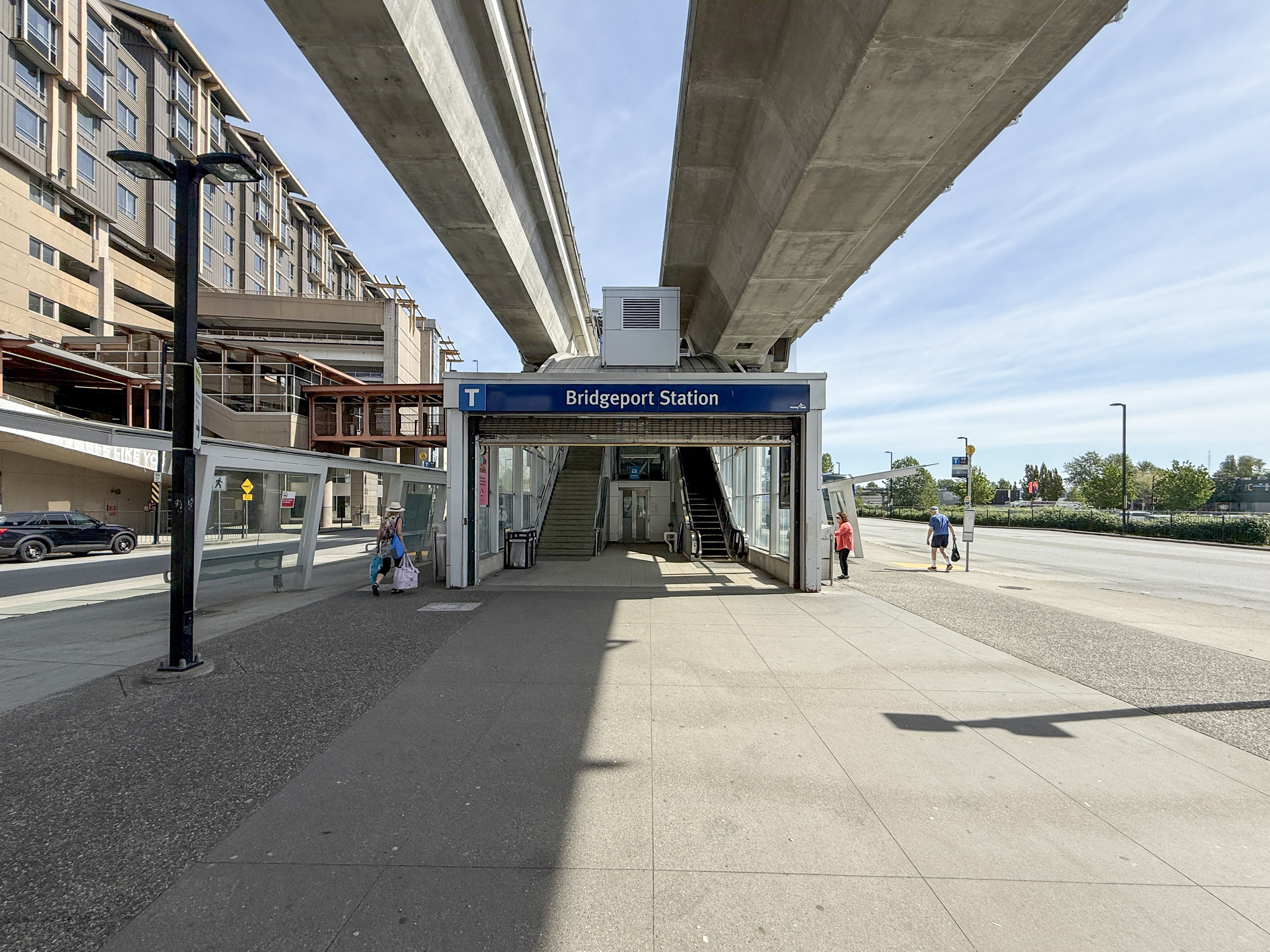
Bridgeport station entrance. The car park and connecting walkway can be seen to the left.
