= Dinsmore Airport =

Dinsmore Airport may refer to:

- Dinsmore Airport (California) in Dinsmore, California, United States (FAA: D63)
- Dinsmore Aerodrome in Dinsmore, Saskatchewan, Canada (TC: CKX5)
