= Sea Island (British Columbia) =

Island in the Fraser River estuary in the city of Richmond, British Columbia, Canada

- Sea Island (in red) within the rest of Richmond (pink, which occupies much of Lulu Island) and Metro Vancouver (green)
- Interactive map of Sea Island

Geography
- Location: Fraser River Estuary
- Coordinates: 49°12′N 123°10′W

Administration
- Canada
- Province: British Columbia
- Municipality: Richmond

Sea Island (hən̓q̓əmin̓əm̓: sqʷsaθən) is an island in the Fraser River estuary in the city of Richmond, British Columbia, Canada. It is located south of the city of Vancouver and northwest of Lulu Island.

Sea Island is home to Vancouver International Airport (YVR), a nature conservation area, and a permanent resident population of 814, most of which live in the neighbourhood of Burkeville.

== History ==
The island was traditionally home to the Musqueam First Nation, and they retain ownership over a parcel of land on the island's northwest corner under the administrative title "Sea Island Indian Reserve #3".

The name Sea Island has been credited to Colonel Moody, who surveyed the geography of the Lower Mainland and noticed that at high tide, the island was partially hidden by the sea. It had previously been referred to as McRoberts' Island, after the first European settler on the island, Hugh McRoberts.

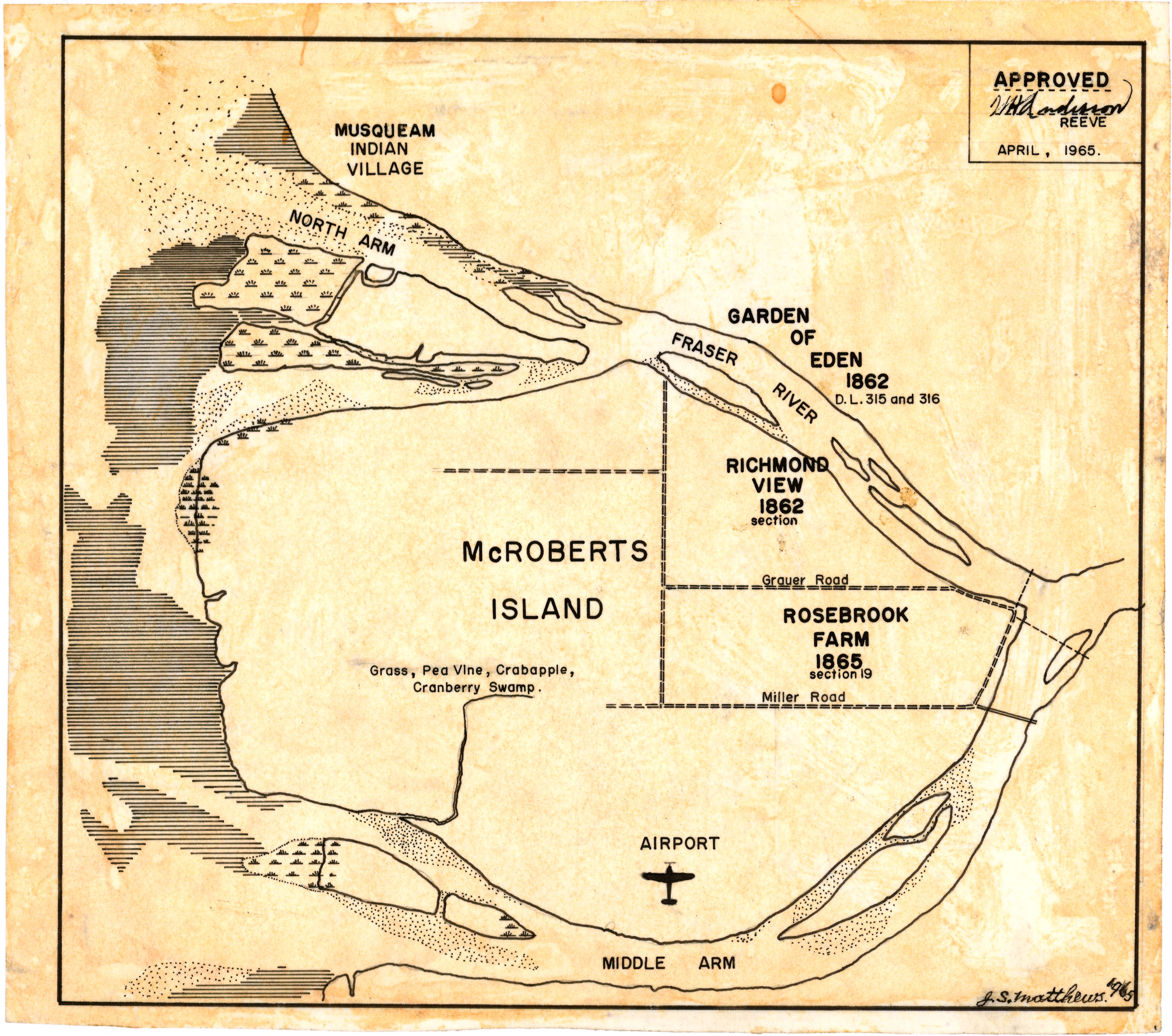
Map of Sea Island, then known as McRoberts Island, 1965

Construction of residential neighbourhoods on the island began during World War II. Under the authority of the Wartime Housing Authority, a 328 home subdivision was built in 1943 to house the employees of the nearby Boeing facility. This village on the island's east side became known as Burkeville, after then-President of Boeing Canada, Stanley Burke.

A second neighbourhood, known as the Cora Brown subdivision, was constructed in 1946 on the north side of the island, originally with 50 houses. Although it grew to the point of requiring the construction of the island's second elementary school in 1962, airport expansion led to the community being disbanded in 1978. No trace of this neighbourhood remains.

== Vancouver International Airport ==
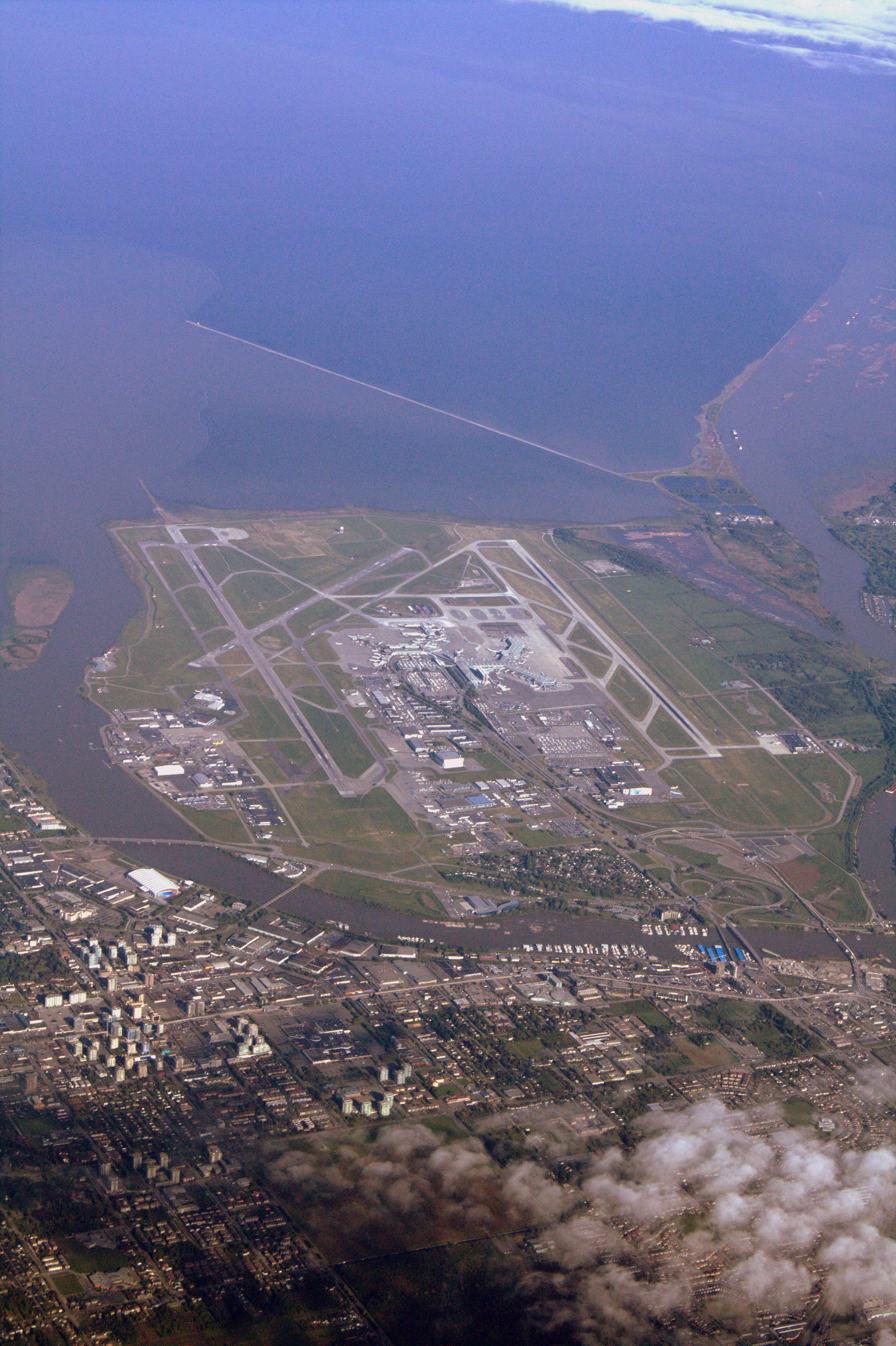
Sea Island and Vancouver International, seen from above

The Vancouver International Airport first opened on Sea Island in 1931, and began servicing Trans-Canada Airlines flights in 1937. The airport received relatively light traffic for the next fifty years until extensive growth in international traffic, primarily between the United States and Asia, necessitated expansion of service. With investments from the airlines and the Canadian government, and a surcharge on tickets to cover costs, the airport began a significant overhaul in the 1990s.

As of 2024, the airport is the second largest in Canada, with over 20 million passengers travelling through each year. It has grown to three passenger terminals and two main runways servicing over fifty airlines.

The YVR Airport South Terminal is located on the south shore of Sea Island.

== Demographics ==
Sea Island is represented by Canadian census dissemination area 59153602, which covers the entirety of the island. In 2021, Sea Island had 819 individuals living in 304 of its 315 total private dwellings, an increase of 0.61% from its 2016 population of 814. The employment rate in the area was 60.6% as of May 2021, slightly above the Canadian average of 57.1%, while the median total income of residents in 2020 was $48,000.

=== Ethnicity ===
Ethnic and panethnic groups in Sea Island, 2021
| Groups | | Population | % of Total Population |
|---|---|---|---|
| Visible minority groups | South Asian | 45 | 5.1% |
| Visible minority groups | Chinese | 170 | 19.3% |
| Visible minority groups | Black | 10 | 1.1% |
| Visible minority groups | Latin American | 40 | 4.5% |
| Visible minority groups | Southeast Asian | 15 | 1.7% |
| Visible minority groups | Japanese | 15 | 1.7% |
| Visible minority groups | Total visible minority population | 320 | 36.4% |
| Indigenous groups | First Nations | 35 | 4.0% |
| Indigenous groups | Métis | 0 | 0.0% |
| Indigenous groups | Total Aboriginal population | 35 | 4.0% |
| European (Note: Statistic includes all persons that did not make up part of a visible minority or an Indigenous identity.) | | 525 | 59.6% |
| Total population | | 880 (Note: Sum of ethnic or cultural groups may be higher than total population estimate due to rounding errors or individuals reporting more than one group) | 100% |
Source: 2021 Canadian census

=== Languages ===
The 2021 census stated 625 persons or 76.2% of Sea Island's population have English as a mother tongue; Cantonese is the mother tongue of 45 persons or 5.5% of the population, followed by Mandarin (35 or 4.3%), Spanish (15 or 1.8%), Punjabi (15 or 1.8%), Hindi (10 or 1.2%), Japanese (10 or 1.2%), French (5 or 0.6%), Tagalog (5 or 0.6%), Vietnamese (5 or 0.6%), Polish (5 or 0.6%), and Thai (5 or 0.6%).

=== Religion ===
| Religion | Population | % of Total Population |
|---|---|---|
| Buddhist | 15 | 1.7% |
| Christian (total) | 250 | 28.4% |
| Christian, not otherwise specified | 85 | 9.7% |
| Anglican | 35 | 4.0% |
| Catholic | 65 | 7.4% |
| United Church | 20 | 2.3% |
| Other Christian traditions | 15 | 1.7% |
| Other religions and spiritual traditions | 20 | 2.3% |
| No religion and secular perspectives | 575 | 65.3% |
| Total population | 880 (Note: Sum of religious groups may be higher than total population estimate due to rounding errors or individuals selecting more than one group) | 100% |
Source: 2021 Canadian census

== Ground transportation ==
Grant McConachie Way is the primary east–west artery leading to the main airport terminal, while a significant amount of commuter traffic from Vancouver to Richmond crosses Sea Island north-south via Russ Baker Way. Sea Island is connected to Vancouver to the north via the Arthur Laing Bridge, and to Richmond via the No. 2 Road Bridge, Dinsmore Bridge, Moray Bridge and the Sea Island Connector.

Sea Island is served by three stations on the Canada Line branch of the SkyTrain rapid transit network, namely, Templeton, Sea Island Centre, and YVR-Airport. The SkyTrain connects Sea Island to central Richmond and downtown Vancouver.

TransLink also operates one bus on Sea Island, route 412, which connects the YVR South Terminal to Bridgeport Station.

== Environmental areas ==
=== Sea Island Conservation Area ===
The Sea Island Conservation Area (SICA) is located adjacent to Vancouver International Airport (YVR) and consists of approximately 140.1 hectares (1.4 square kilometres) of land on the north side of Sea Island dedicated for conservation of wildlife and habitat. SICA was transferred to Environment Canada as a compensation package funded by Transport Canada to replace wildlife habitat lost as a result of runway expansion at Vancouver International Airport (YVR). The main goal for management of SICA is to maintain existing populations of wildlife that do not compromise aviation safety.

Habitats on SICA consist of woodland, wetland sloughs, and old agricultural field habitat which support a diversity of birds, land mammals, and terrestrial plants. SICA habitat management discourages populations of flocking birds that may pose hazards to aviation safety, as well as discourages populations of beavers that can cause prevalent, severe and costly damage to habitat.

=== Sturgeon Bank Wildlife Management Area ===
Sturgeon Bank is a designated wildlife management area located off the west side of the island at the delta front of the Fraser River estuary. The area consists primarily of nearshore, foreshore, and subtidal waters. Boating is prohibited in the area in order to protect the habitats of numerous bird and fish populations.

== Beaches and parks ==
Sea Island has two public beaches, McDonald Beach Park and Iona Beach Regional Park.

McDonald Beach is operated by the city of Richmond. It is a recreational space, with an off-leash area for dogs, picnic tables, and boat docking available.

Iona Beach is operated by the Greater Vancouver Regional District, with a focus the protection and study of the native flora and fauna. It is located on Iona Island, the peninsula on the northwest corner of Sea Island, and houses two jetties that extend into the Strait of Georgia.

== Other services ==
Sea Island's south shore features a Canadian Coast Guard station, as well as floatplane docks and a business jet terminal. The island is home to Richmond Fire Hall No. 4, which was built in 2007 to replace the 60-year old hall that was formerly located within Burkeville.

The island is also home to the Aerospace and Aviation Technology campus of the British Columbia Institute of Technology, as well as two hotels run by Fairmont and Radisson. In 2015, the McArthurGlen Designer Outlet opened on the island as a joint venture between the Vancouver International Airport and the McArthurGlen Group.

Burkeville was previously served by the Sea Island School, which taught children from kindergarten to grade 3, after which they would commute to schools on Lulu Island, primarily Samuel Brighouse Elementary. However, in 2019, the school was closed by the Richmond School District, despite protest from members of the community, due to low enrolment and high seismic risk.

== See also ==
- 98 B-Line
- Airport Station
- Mitchell Island
