= Dinsmore, California =

Unincorporated community in California, United States

Dinsmore
- Unincorporated community
- Nickname: Center of the Emerald Triangle
- Location in California
- Coordinates: 40°29′30″N 123°36′25″W
- Country: United States
- State: California
- County: Humboldt
- Elevation: 2,415 ft (736 m)

Dinsmore is an unincorporated community in Humboldt County, California, United States. It is located on the Van Duzen River, at an elevation of 2,415 feet (736 m). Dinsmore Airport and the Dinsmore Store are located nearby. Also nearby are the Mad River, Ruth and Ruth Reservoir (located in Trinity County).

Dinsmore's economy centered on tourism and logging. The Dinsmore Lodge was a popular summer vacation destination in the early twentieth century; it declined after World War II, but was restored in the early 1970s, when it was being used as low-rent housing for employees of a local Louisiana Pacific Corporation sawmill. The company closed its Dinsmore sawmill in 1977, and the community never recovered.

== Climate ==
This region experiences warm (but not hot) and dry summers, with no average monthly temperatures above 71.6 °F. According to the Köppen Climate Classification system, Dinsmore has a warm-summer Mediterranean climate, abbreviated "Csb" on climate maps.
