= Iona Island (British Columbia) =

Peninsula adjacent to Richmond, British Columbia, Canada

Coordinates: 49.217°N 123.198°W

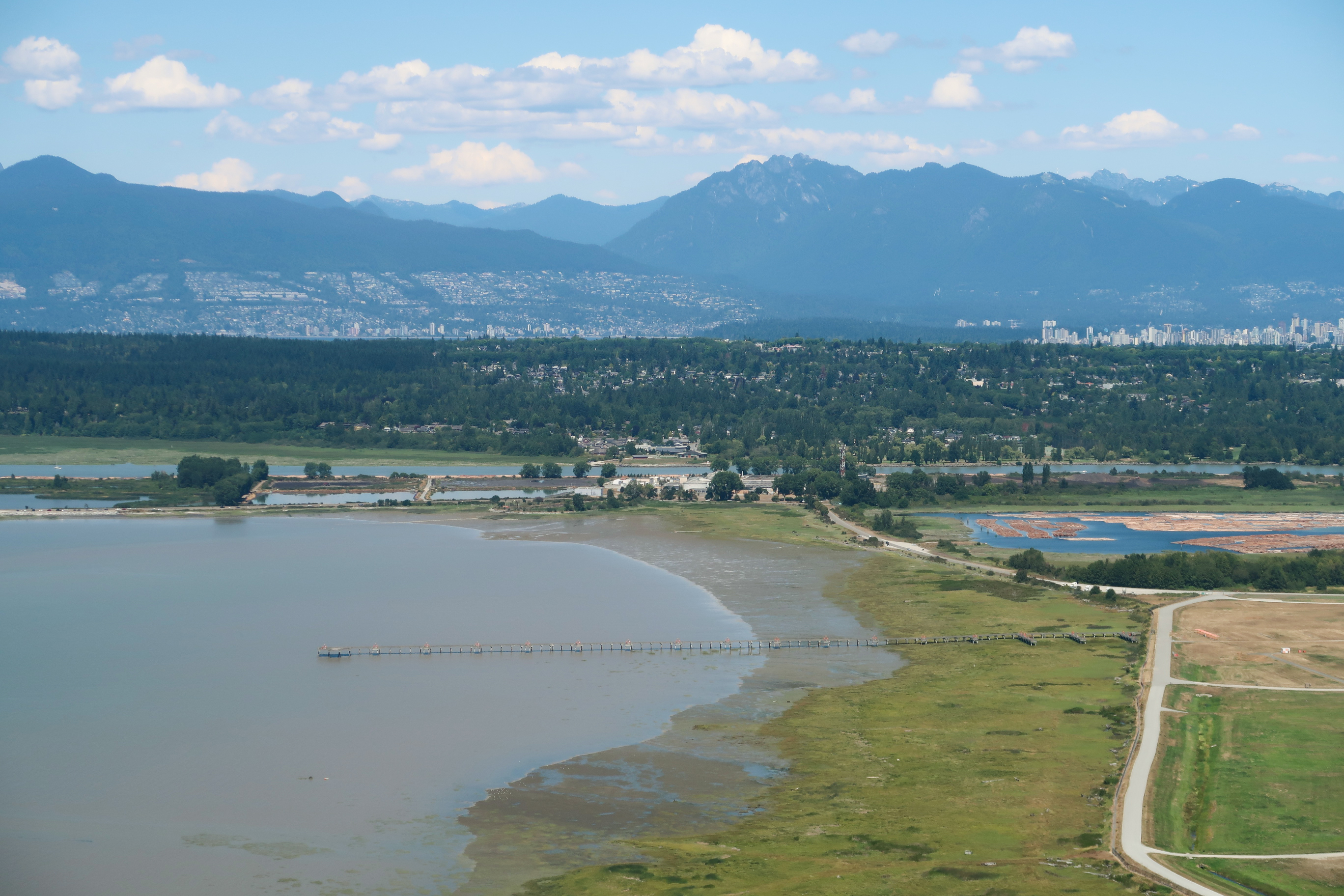
Iona Island is located almost adjacent to the Vancouver International Airport

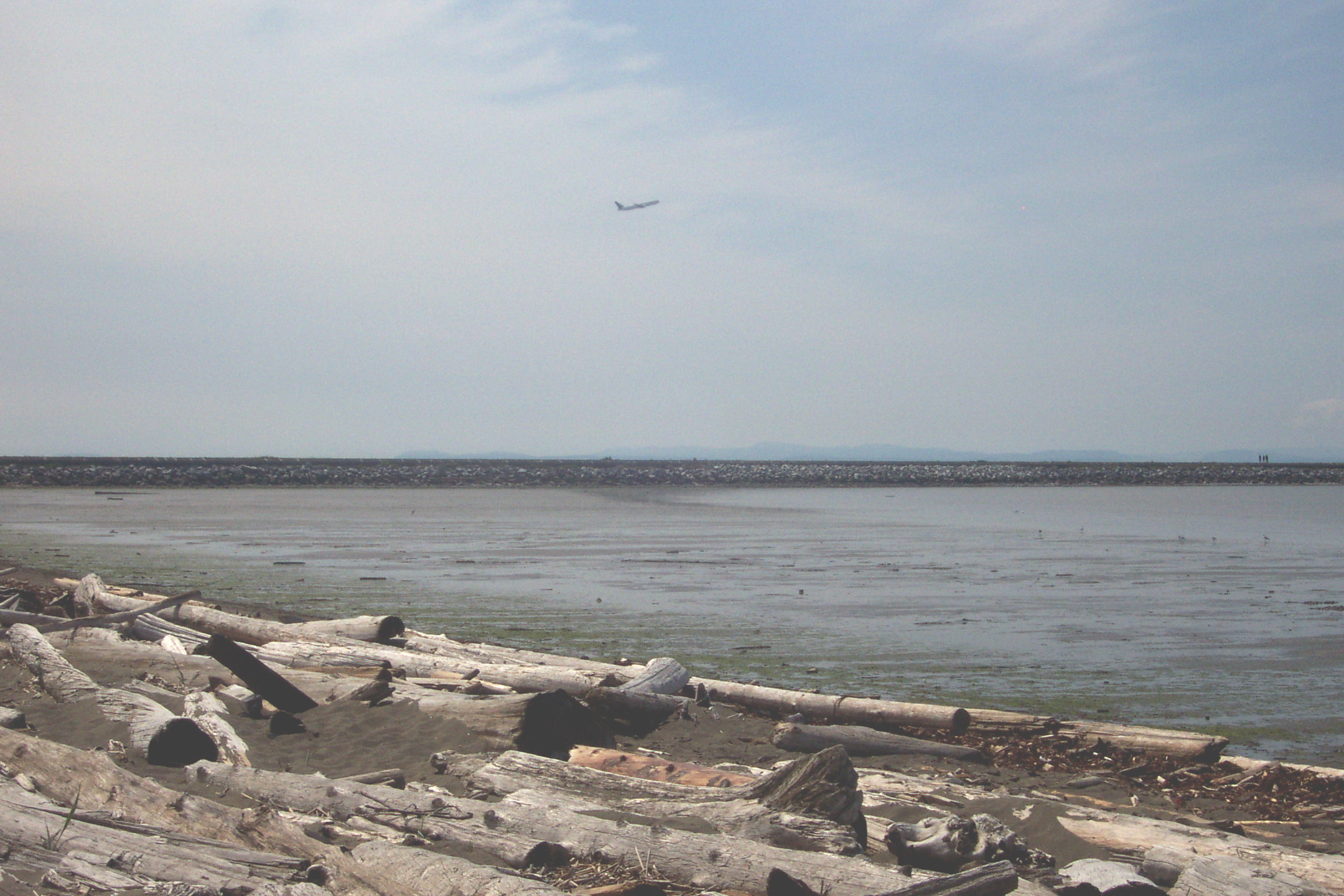
Iona Beach Regional Park, Iona Jetty in the distance

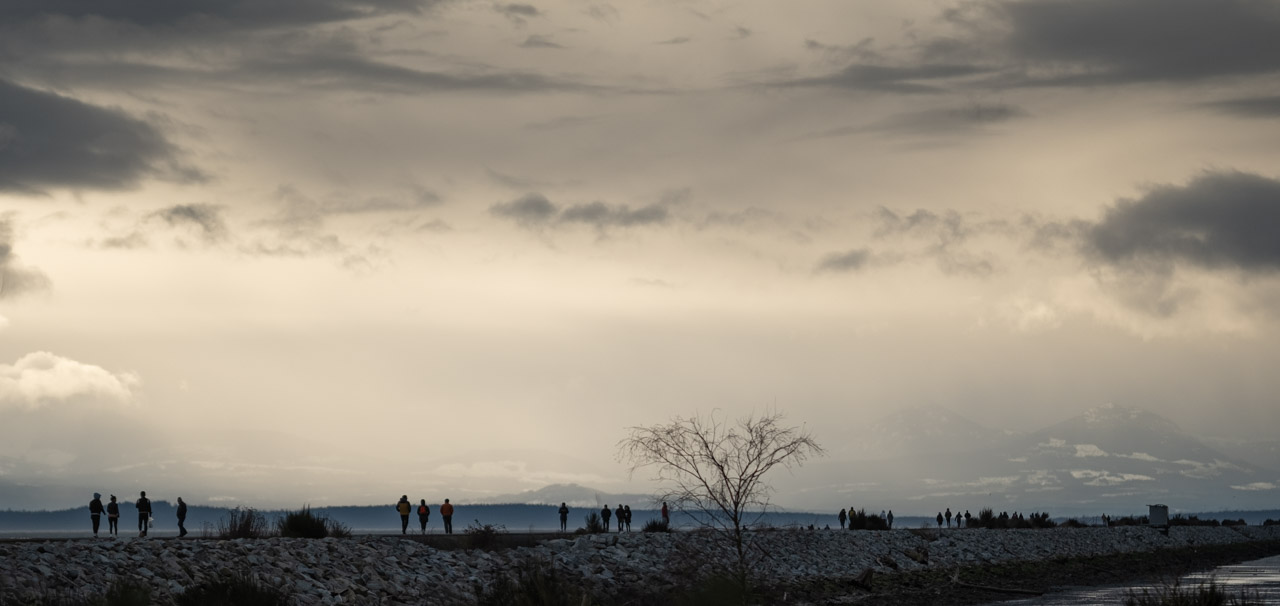
People on the South Jetty on a grey winter's day in 2021.

Iona Island (Halkomelem: xʷəyeyət) in Richmond, British Columbia, Canada was formerly an island, but is now a peninsula physically connected to Sea Island via a causeway and Ferguson Road. Iona is home to a primary sewage treatment plant (located in the middle), an animal refuge and a park (Iona Beach Regional Park). The Iona Sewage Plant is located near the centre of the island and has tours for the public. Iona Beach Regional Park also features a beach adjacent to wildlife from the nearby animal refuge. The park is managed by Metro Vancouver. Iona Island is located almost adjacent to the Vancouver International Airport. The park is mostly visited by birders, as the sewage ponds have attracted many rare shorebirds such as spoon-billed sandpiper, great knot, and red-necked stint.

== Jetties ==
Two jetties, owned by the Government of Canada, stretch out into the Strait of Georgia from Iona Island. The south jetty, Iona Jetty, juts out nearly 4 km (2.5 mi) into the Strait. Recreational visitors may walk or cycle on the twin gravel trails atop and beside the large sewage pipe that stretches the length of the jetty. The North Arm Jetty, while longer, is not as popular; it is a sandy bar (as opposed to the gravel and concrete structure of Iona Jetty) that stretches towards the northwest, running parallel to the Vancouver shoreline and terminating at the University Endowment Lands, almost directly across from the University of British Columbia campus, and visible from Wreck Beach.

== See also ==
- Sea Island (British Columbia) – Island in the Fraser River estuary in the city of Richmond, British Columbia, Canada
- Douglas Island (British Columbia) – Island in Port Coquitlam, British Columbia
- Mitchell Island – Island in the North Arm of the Fraser River in British Columbia, Canada
- Granville Island - a peninsula and shopping district in the Fairview neighbourhood of Vancouver
