= Dinsmore Bridge =

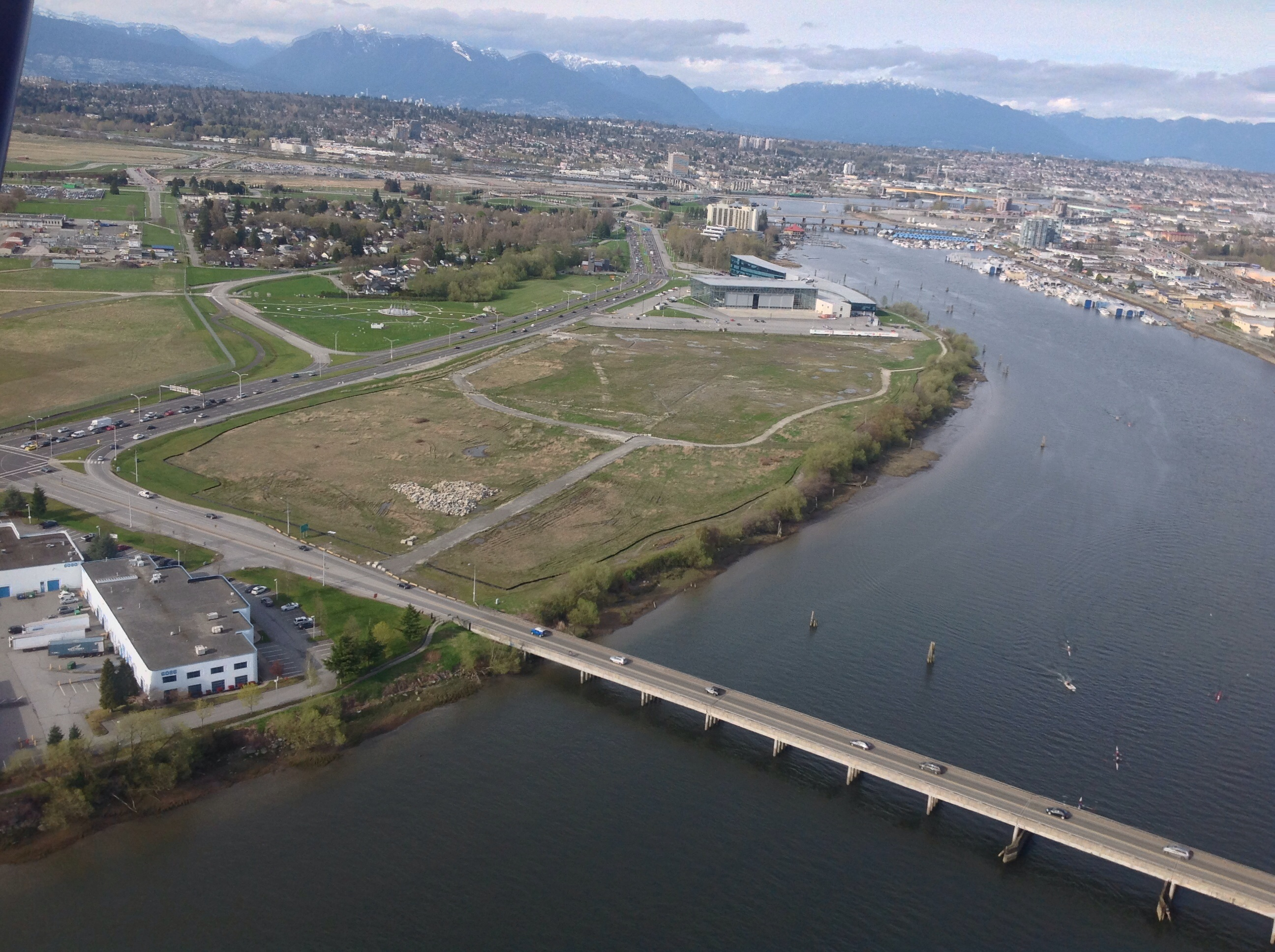
- Coordinates: 49°10′44″N 123°08′56″W
- Carries: Two lanes of Gilbert Road and sidewalk
- Crosses: Middle Arm Fraser River
- Locale: Richmond
- Owner: Vancouver International Airport (YVR)

Characteristics
- Design: girder bridge
- Total length: 300 m

History
- Opened: August 15, 1969

Location
- Interactive map of Dinsmore Bridge

The Dinsmore Bridge is a crossing over the middle arm of the Fraser River, and a former section of River Rd., in Metro Vancouver.

== History ==
=== Dinsmore Island ===
In the 1870s, John Brough, who acquired this island adjacent to Sea Island, built a small house and farmed what became Brough Island. Hugh Boyd purchased the 210-acre property, but resold it to John Errington, who dyked and drained the land in the 1880s. The Goodmurphy cannery, which opened in 1894, was incorporated the following year as the Dinsmore Island Canning Co. by John Dinsmore, M.B. Wilkinson, W.D. Goodmurphy, and Caleb Goodmurphy. The cannery presence renamed the location to Dinsmore Island. In the early 1900s, BC Packers acquired the cannery along with many others along the arms of the Fraser. The plant was demolished in 1913.

In 1920, Bob Doherty purchased Dinsmore Island and Pheasant Island in a tax sale. Clearing the neglected land, he maintained a dairy herd, and tenant farmers grew sugar beet and peas. Doherty also arranged the construction of a bridge from Sea Island, via Pheasant Island at the eastern end of Dinsmore Island. In 1939, the federal government expropriated the farm for airport expansion, and the Doherty family moved to Ladner. Channel filling amalgamated Pheasant Island into Dinsmore Island, which in turn absorbed into Sea Island by 1952.

=== Dinsmore Bridge ===
The federal Department of Transport called tenders for the bridge in 1968, and for the Vancouver International Airport (YVR) approach roads on Sea Island in 1969, describing the location as Dinsmore Island and the crossing as the Dinsmore Island Bridge. The bridge cost about $550,000, but the whole project appears to have totalled $845,000. The City of Richmond extended Gilbert Rd. to the southern shore, at a cost of $180,000, which included bridging the Lansdowne Canal.

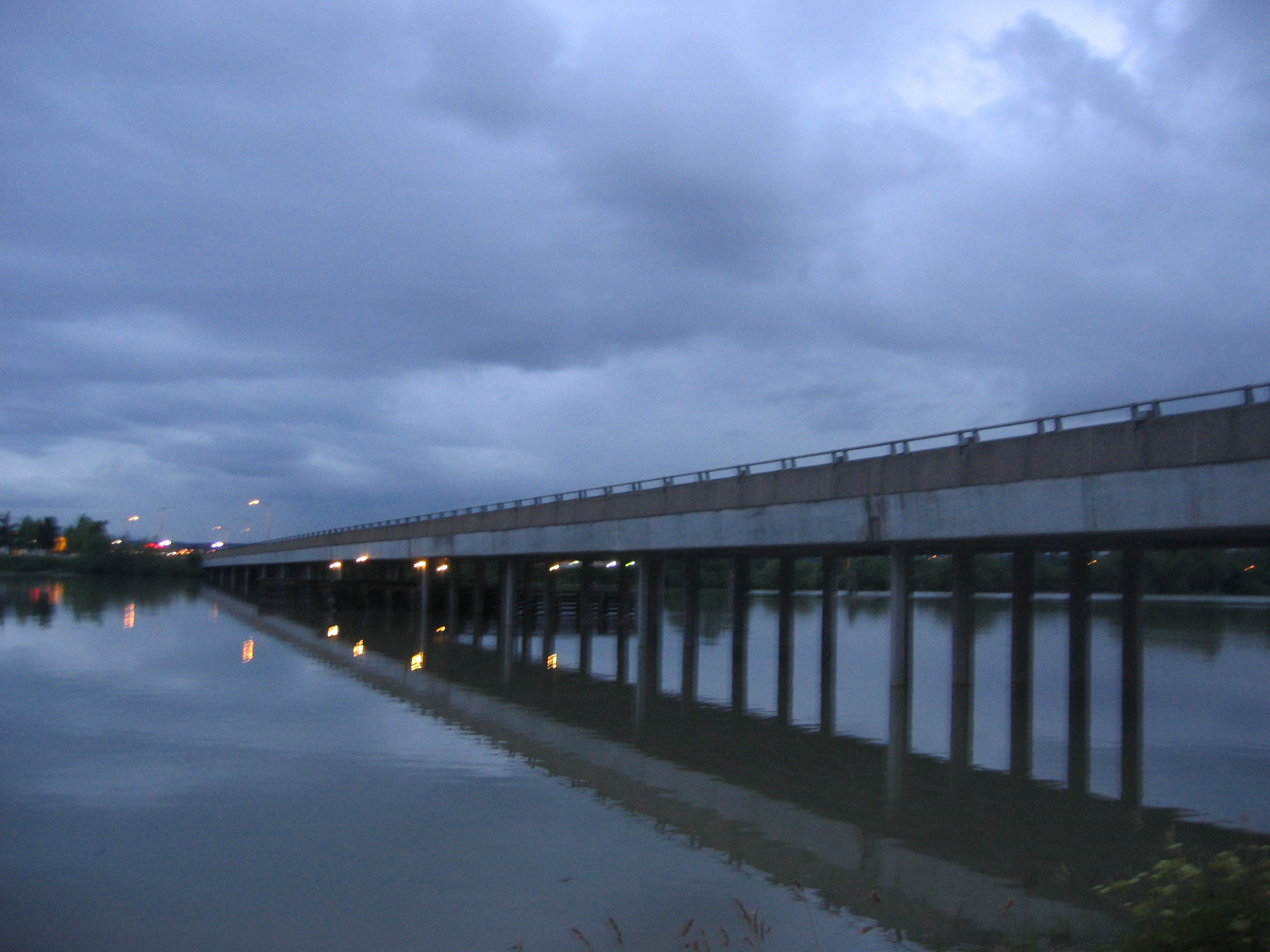

The drab concrete structure, which stands on a series of concrete pillars, opened without ceremony on August 15, 1969. Fears it would be tolled never eventuated. YVR owns and maintains this low-level two-lane bridge, with a pedestrian sidewalk on the west side. Being federal property, signage is in both official languages. Although immediately relieving the Moray Bridge, the 1975 opening of the Arthur Laing Bridge, further increased traffic volumes. The two lanes of traffic from Russ Baker Way merging into one lane to cross the Dinsmore, caused rush hour congestion. Although the widening of Russ Baker Way to accommodate the 1993 opening of the No. 2 Road Bridge initially reduced the left turn to a single lane, further widening has returned the double turn lanes. The bridge provides the most direct access to Richmond Hospital and the WorkSafeBC headquarters, and prior to 1993, served all west Richmond traffic.

On October 11, 2006, the bridge closed for several days after a truck on River Road, carrying a crane to the Oval site, damaged eight pre-stressed concrete girders on the underside of the bridge. Re-opening October 13, weight and speed restrictions were temporarily in place. The posted clearance is 4.3 metres (14.1 ft).

In 2011, a Beechcraft King Air 100 crash landed near the Russ Baker Way intersection. The two pilots died from burns.

In 2014, a novice driver struck and killed a pedestrian, who was standing at the Russ Baker Way intersection waiting to cross. The driver, no longer in Canada, has a warrant out for his arrest. A memorial motorcycle ride takes place on each anniversary.

During 2017–2018, unidentified parties tossed plastic bags full of human excrement onto the bridge.

YVR has a goal to seismically upgrade the bridge, or build a wider replacement to better accommodate vehicles, cyclists and pedestrians.

=== South bank redevelopment ===
During 2014–2015, River Road was extended eastward along the former CP right-of way to the south end of the bridge. A new ramp beside the bridge linked this road to its existing foreshore alignment. The city intends to continue the four-lane road along the right-of way for 1.5 kilometres (0.9 mi) to Capstan Way. From east of the bridge, the emerging 37-acre waterfront Lulu Island Park will replace the existing foreshore commercial infrastructure and paving. By 2017, the city had purchased most of the 28 acres of industrial land. To the immediate west of the bridge, construction has begun on a three-tower residential complex.

== See also ==
- List of crossings of the Fraser River
- List of BC bridges
