= Compass card (British Columbia) =

Public transit fare collection system in Metro Vancouver, Canada

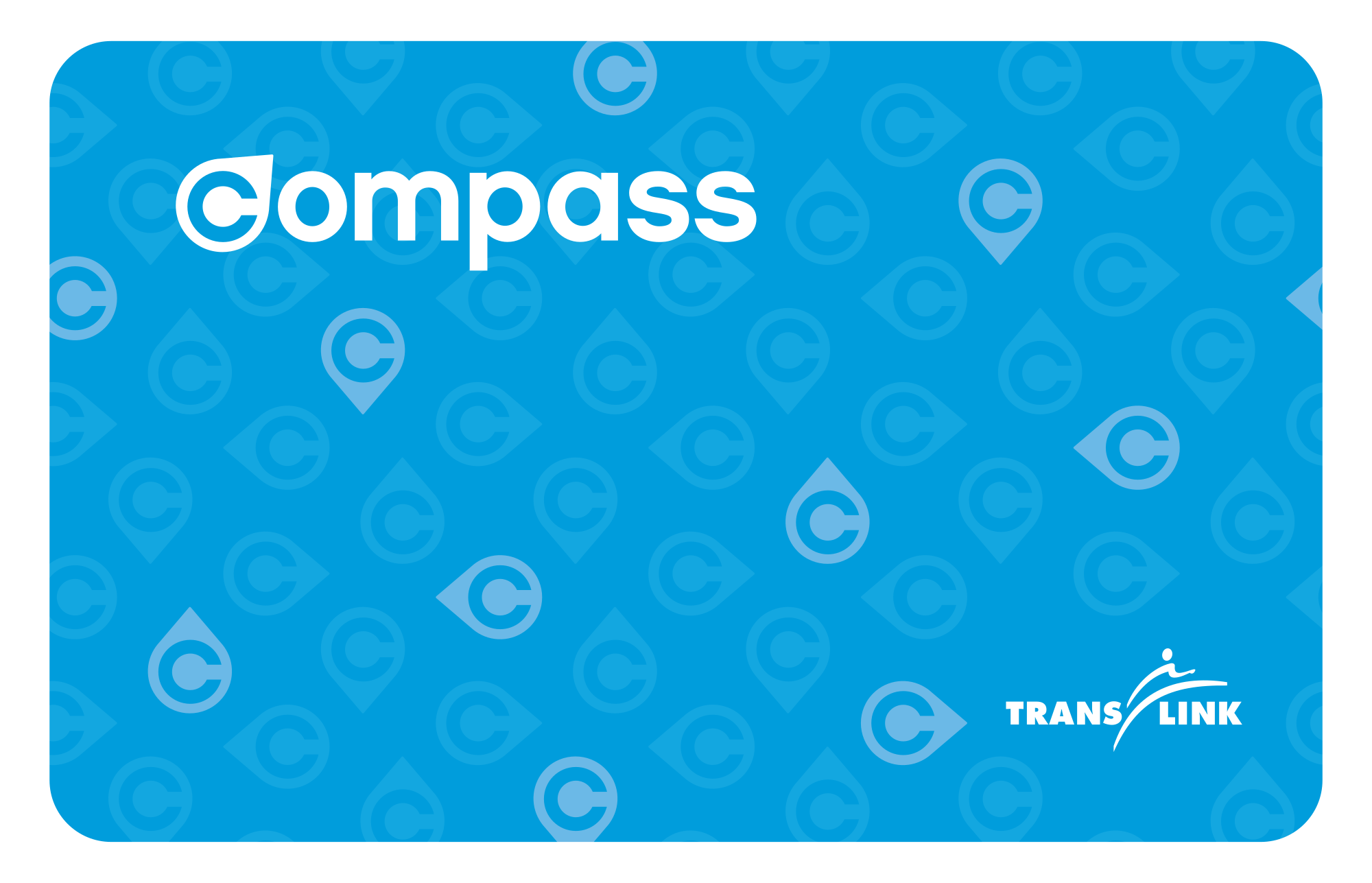
- Location: Lower Mainland
- Launched: September 2013 (beta); August 2015 (public)
- Technology: Contactless smart card
- Operator: Cubic Transportation Systems
- Manager: TransLink
- Currency: Canadian dollar ($175 maximum load)
- Stored-value: Pay as you go
- Auto recharge: Autoload (registration required)
- Validity: Buses; SeaBus; SkyTrain; West Coast Express
- Retailed: Online; Compass Vending Machines (at all stations); London Drugs; Tsawwassen Ferry Terminal (CVM); Horseshoe Bay Ferry Terminal (CVM); 7-Eleven; Various convenience stores
- Variants: See list
- Website: compasscard.ca

The Compass card is a contactless smart card automated fare collection system used primarily for public transit in Metro Vancouver, British Columbia, Canada. Compass card readers were first implemented as a beta in September 2013. Due to delays, full implementation to the general public began in August 2015. The system is operated by Cubic Transportation Systems and is managed by TransLink, the transportation authority for the region.

Compass cards and tickets have been required for all trips taken by SkyTrain, SeaBus, and West Coast Express since April 8, 2016. By June 2016, TransLink reported that more than 915,000 customers had switched to using Compass, which included 95% of customers who could have used other fare media such as cash or paper-based FareSaver tickets.

Riders are able to purchase Compass cards and add fare value online, by phone, or at Compass vending machines located at SeaBus terminals, SkyTrain stations, and West Coast Express stations. Compass vending machines are also available at 18 participating London Drugs retail store locations.

== Overview ==
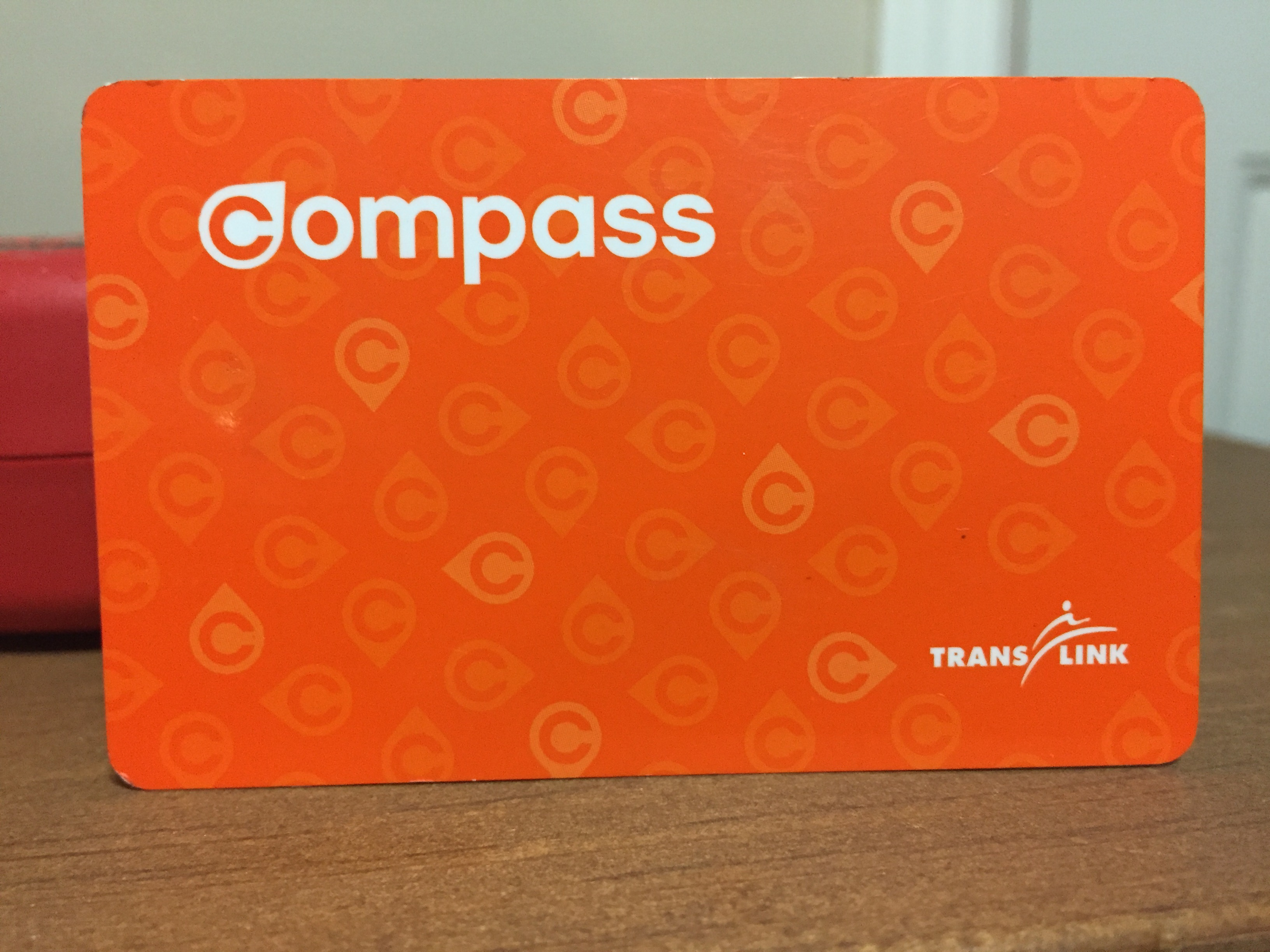
Orange Compass cards are used to pay concession fares.

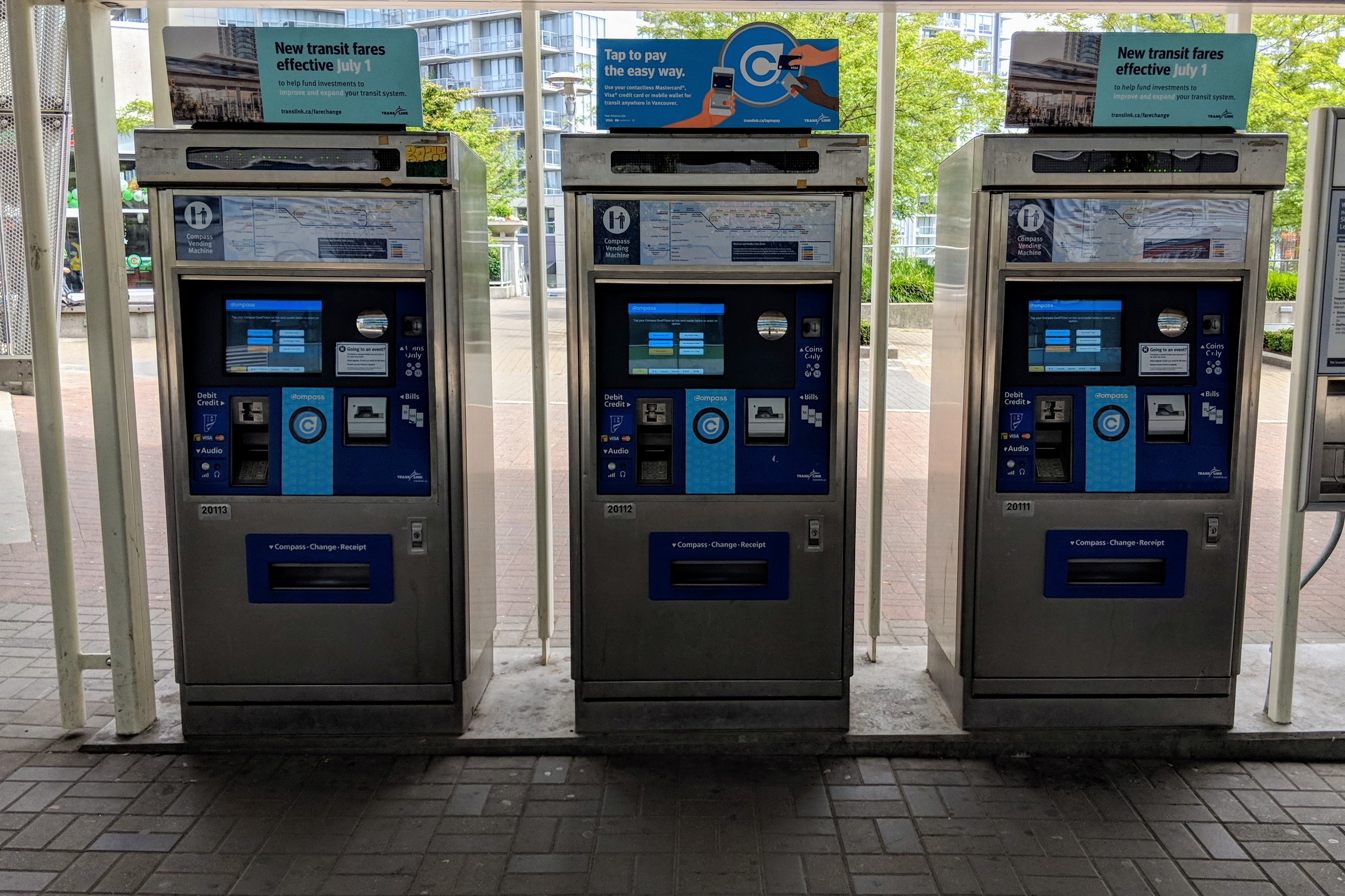
Compass vending machines (CVM) located at King George station

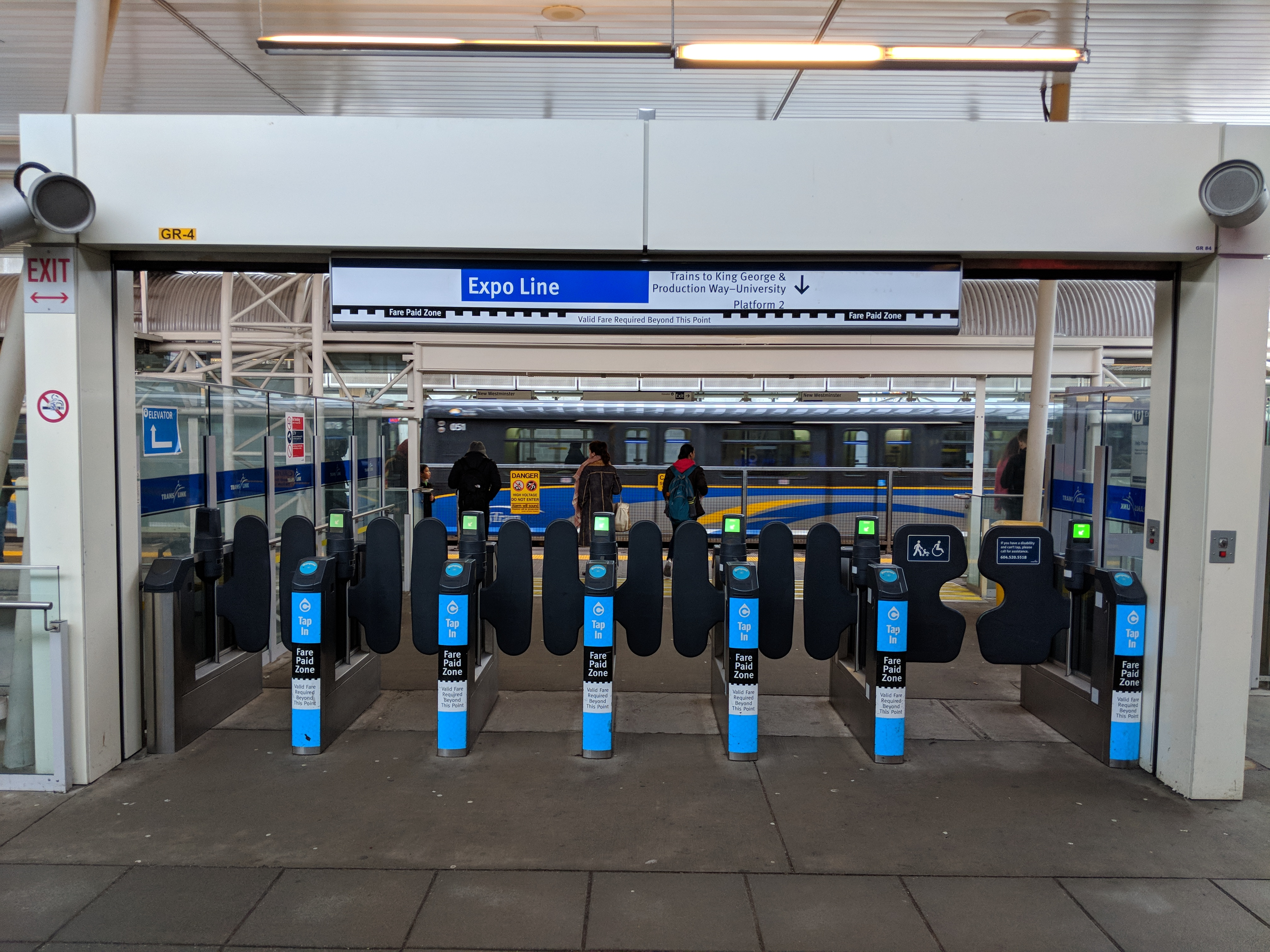
Compass fare gates on the platform level at New Westminster station

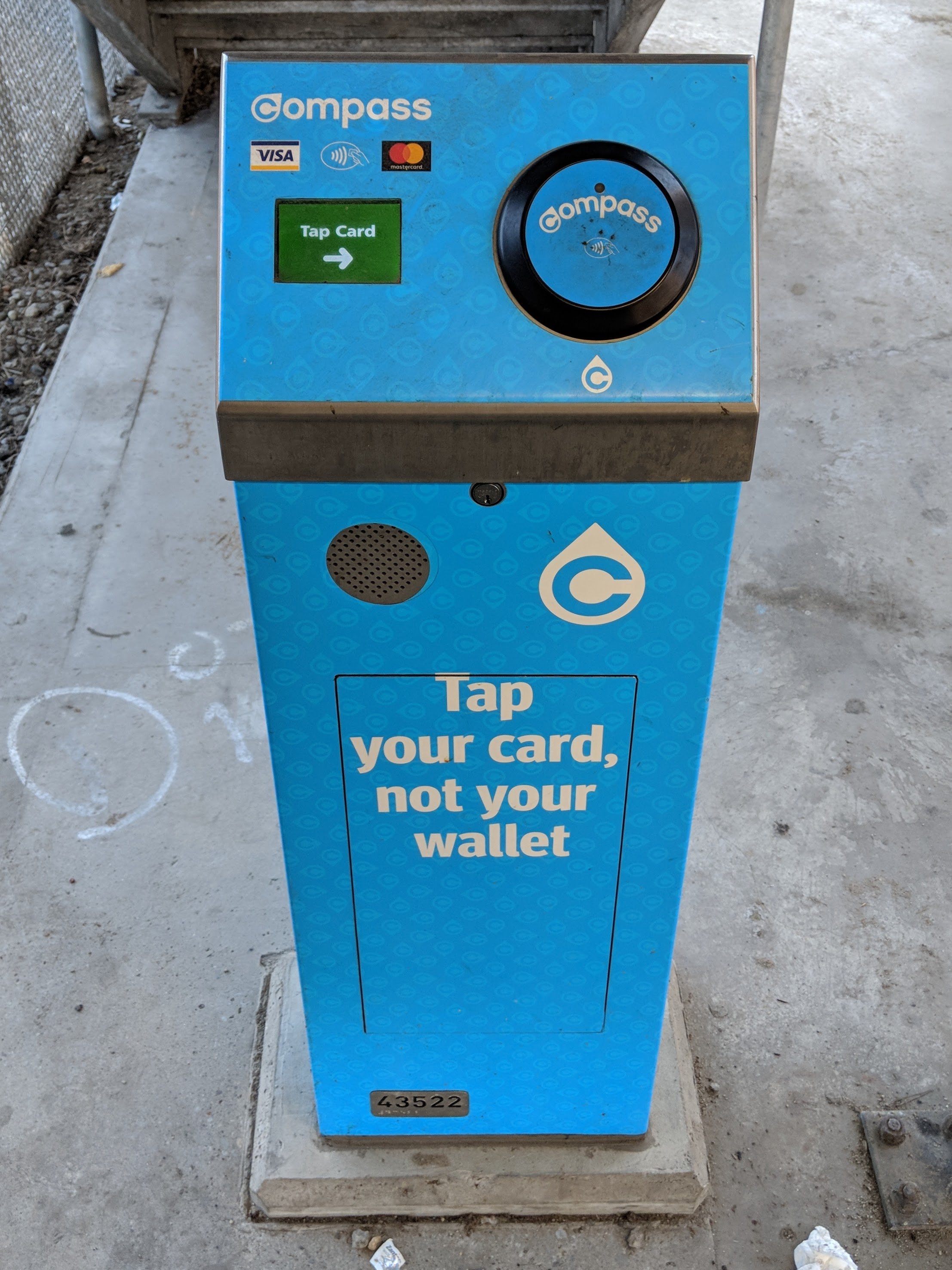
Compass card reader located on Spruce Street at Sapperton station

Users start by obtaining a Compass card, which requires a CA$6 refundable deposit, from one of the Compass vending machines located at SkyTrain, SeaBus, or West Coast Express stations, then add value to the card online, by phone, or directly at the vending machines. Compass cards are also available for purchase online, at London Drugs retail locations, and at various convenience stores.

TransLink estimated that 80,000 users were using the system by the end of January 2014. As of June 2016, Compass cards had been tapped on the system more than 371 million times, at a rate of more than 1.5 million every weekday. TransLink recorded a ridership increase of 1.8 percent and 3.2 percent in increased fare revenues in 2015, according to its 2015 annual report.

== Fares ==
Transit riders will have the option of paying for fares by Compass card or cash, but the Compass card offers lower fares. A rider who makes a cash payment at a Compass vending machine receives a paper-based Compass Ticket which is good for transfers within the 90-minute transfer period (180 minutes for West Coast Express).

Nearly half of TransLink's revenues come from fares. TransLink uses a three-zone fare system in the region for SkyTrain, Canada Line, West Coast Express and SeaBus service, with single adult fares ranging from $2.85 to $5.60 on weekdays. All fares on buses across the region are set at the one zone rate of $2.85, a switch TransLink made during the roll out of the Compass contactless smart card payment system.

Users purchase a Compass card for a $6 refundable deposit, then load it with stored value. The $6 deposit can be used temporarily if a rider forgets to maintain enough stored value, but the value on the card must be replenished above $6 before the next trip or they will not be able to tap in.

=== Stored value ===
The following tables illustrates single trip fares during peak and off-peak hours for bus, SeaBus, and SkyTrain riders.

SeaBus and SkyTrain (weekdays from start of service until 6:30pm)	Zone 1	Zone 2	Zone 3	YVR AddFare
Adult	$2.85	$4.20	$5.40	+$6.50
Concession	$2.30	$3.40	$4.60	+$6.50

Buses (all day); SeaBus and SkyTrain (weekdays after 6:30pm, weekends, and holidays)	All zones	YVR AddFare
Adult	$2.85	+$6.50
Concession	$2.30	+$6.50

Users must maintain a minimum of $0.01 value on the card to tap into buses, SkyTrain, or SeaBus, and a minimum of $4.50 to tap into West Coast Express.

=== Other passes ===
DayPasses, U-Passes, and one-, two-, or three-zone monthly passes can be loaded directly onto the Compass card, with the option to renew automatically every month. Users who register online benefit from the auto renewal and balance protection, which protects the stored value in the event of card loss or theft. Passes are used prior to Stored Value being used.

== History ==
SkyTrain and SeaBus were barrier-free at their inception. BC Transit, and later TransLink, took the position that the barrier-free proof of payment system was more effective than having fare gates or turnstiles. In the early 2000s, they estimated a five percent fare evasion rate on SkyTrain, or approximately CA$2 million or less per year. Fare checks and fines issued inside Fare Paid Zones kept the rates at that level. Since the staff conducting the checks – SkyTrain attendants and transit police – would still be required even with physical fare barriers, maintaining a barrier fare system would be more costly than the barrier-free option.

In late 2007, the provincial Minister of Transportation, Kevin Falcon, announced interest in the installation of an access-controlled fare system.

In March 2008, Ken Dobell, a lobbyist for Cubic Corporation, started talks with Falcon with the intention of selling technology to TransLink. Dobell, BC premier Gordon Campbell's former deputy minister and previously the first CEO of TransLink, had just been found guilty of breaching the Lobbyists Registration Act.

In April 2009, the Office of the Premier, the Government of Canada, and TransLink announced the implementation of fare gates and smart cards.

In 2010, TransLink held a contest to decide the name of the smart card system. The contest received 56,000 entries with 14,000 unique names. The four finalists from the public contest were Otter, Umbrella, Compass, and George (named after George Vancouver). In January 2011, TransLink ran an online poll where participants could vote between the names Compass, TPass, and Starfish, with the latter two being introduced by TransLink. Compass was announced as the winner on March 31, 2011.

In September 2013, the Compass card system underwent a 3-week beta test phase to evaluate its functionality and user-friendliness. Selected beta testers received a Compass card loaded with $100 that could be tapped in and out, but these were not considered a valid payment of one's fare. As a result, testers were required to carry an additional valid FareSaver ticket.

The Compass Card system was launched in August 2015 as part of an initial transition phase. During this transition phase, users could still purchase and use FareSaver tickets, with fare gates at SeaBus and SkyTrain stations remaining opened. Initially, users were required to tap their card upon exiting a bus to track the number of fare zones travelled. However, in October 2015, buses were designated as a single fare zone, eliminating the need for a tap-out system on buses—a change that, while initially temporary, became permanent.

In late October 2015, cards became available from Compass vending machines at London Drugs stores. The transition phase ended on April 4, 2016, with fare gates closing and Compass cards being required to enter Seabus and SkyTrain stations.

In August 2022, TransLink announced they were working on allowing Compass cards to be stored in digital wallets; however, they noted the feature could take years to implement.

=== Modernization plans ===
In November 2025, TransLink sent out a request for proposal for the modernization of the Compass system. The agency revealed that the current setup under operator Cubic has a number of technical limitations that were hindering the possibility of implementing distance-based fares as well as the implementation of a dedicated smartphone app. Earlier that month, TransLink rejected a proposal from Cubic to continue its role as the incumbent contractor. The new system's cost was estimated at $507 million.

== Card variants ==
Several limited edition versions of the Compass card, including non-card form factors, have been produced by TransLink and sold at certain locations or to commemorate events. These items have frequently been resold on other markets by scalpers at a higher price.

Variant	Design	Fare type	Availability	Notes
Adult	CardplusCompasslogo	Adult fare (19 to 64)	Available at any Compass vending machine including select London Drugs locations	
Concession	CompassConcession	Concession fare	HandyCard holders; Seniors 65+; Youth 13 to 18 with photo ID; Can only be bought at Compass retailers, the TransLink Customer Service Centre at Waterfront station, online, or by telephone	Children under 12 ride free
Compass ticket	Canadian TransLink Compass Ticket Card	Adult fare (one-time use)	Available at any Compass vending machine	Despite being paper-based, they are not recyclable due to the smartcard circuitry laminate between the paper.
Compass ticket	Compass Concession Ticket	Concession fare (one-time use)	Available at any Compass vending machine	Despite being paper-based, they are not recyclable due to the smartcard circuitry laminate between the paper.
GradPass		Unlimited travel (1 day)	Given to secondary school students during their graduation	
Personalized program passes	Red and white	Varies	BC Bus Pass Program clients; Access Transit/HandyDART card; Burkeville residents (exempt from the YVR AddFare for SkyTrain stations on Sea Island)	Features the name of the cardholder
RFID Compass card		Varies	Customers who would normally require assistance to tap their card.	Uses an RFID signal to automatically open an accessible fare gate
CNIB ID Compass card	White	Unlimited travel	Distributed by CNIB to Metro Vancouver residents who are legally blind	
Contractor access card	Yellow	None	Contractors who require access to fare paid zones	Cannot be used for riding TransLink services
Employee Compass card		Unlimited travel	TransLink employees and 2 members of their immediate family	
Compass wristband	CardplusCompasslogo	Adult fare	Initially limited to 1000 adult and 1000 concession wristbands; they sold out in two hours. A batch of 10,000 wristbands arrived in February 2019.	Rolled out on December 3, 2018. These wristbands function the same as Compass cards.
Compass wristband		Concession fare	Initially limited to 1000 adult and 1000 concession wristbands; they sold out in two hours. A batch of 10,000 wristbands arrived in February 2019.	Rolled out on December 3, 2018. These wristbands function the same as Compass cards.
Compass wristband	Black	Unlimited travel	TransLink employees and 2 members of their immediate family	Rolled out on December 3, 2018. These wristbands function the same as Compass cards.
Compass Mini		Adult fare	There were 5000 adult and 2500 concession Mini cards available when they were first released. The cards were restocked in 2020.	A smaller version of the Compass card that fits on a keyring, unveiled in December 2019
Compass Mini	Orange	Concession fare	There were 5000 adult and 2500 concession Mini cards available when they were first released. The cards were restocked in 2020.	A smaller version of the Compass card that fits on a keyring, unveiled in December 2019
Evergreen Extension		Adult fare	2016 limited edition	Commemorates the opening of the Evergreen Extension
Canada 150	White with Canada 150 emblem	Adult fare	2017 limited edition. 20,000 cards were released.	Commemorates the 150th anniversary of Canada
2018 Remembrance Day	Dark blue with poppy illustration	Adult fare	2018 limited edition	Remembrance Day card honouring Canadian veterans and commemorating the 100th anniversary of the end of World War I
2018 Remembrance Day	Photo of poppy field at sunset	Concession fare	2018 limited edition	Remembrance Day card honouring Canadian veterans and commemorating the 100th anniversary of the end of World War I
Shared mobility	White	Adult fare	Provided to approximately 200 employees of select Vancouver-based employers	2019 pilot program featuring a co-branded card that can be used with TransLink, Modo, Evo, and Mobi services
Be Kind, Be Calm, Be Safe		Adult fare	2020 limited edition. 3000 cards were made available.	Vertical design featuring the quote "Be Kind, Be Calm, Be Safe", an often-recited mantra of provincial health officer Bonnie Henry during the COVID-19 pandemic in British Columbia
Compass Mini-Train		Adult fare	2022 limited edition, 3,000 adult and 2,000 concession products were released	Released in December 2022, shaped like a SkyTrain that lights up when tapped on a Compass reader
Compass Mini-Train		Concession fare	2022 limited edition, 3,000 adult and 2,000 concession products were released	Released in December 2022, shaped like a SkyTrain that lights up when tapped on a Compass reader
Compass Mini-Trolley	Blue	Adult fare	4000 adult and 1000 concession products were released.	Released on August 16, 2023. It is a miniature shaped like a trolley bus and commemorates 75 years of trolley bus service in Metro Vancouver.
Compass Mini-Trolley	Orange	Concession fare	4000 adult and 1000 concession products were released.	Released on August 16, 2023. It is a miniature shaped like a trolley bus and commemorates 75 years of trolley bus service in Metro Vancouver.
DC Super Hero	Superman	Adult Fare	1000 cards of each superhero were released.	Sold on June 16, 2023, as part of a bundle that included a matching poster, a DC x Translink lanyard, and a protective card holder
DC Super Hero	Batman	Adult Fare	1000 cards of each superhero were released.	Sold on June 16, 2023, as part of a bundle that included a matching poster, a DC x Translink lanyard, and a protective card holder
DC Super Hero	The Flash	Adult Fare	1000 cards of each superhero were released.	Sold on June 16, 2023, as part of a bundle that included a matching poster, a DC x Translink lanyard, and a protective card holder
DC Super Hero	Wonder Woman	Adult Fare	1000 cards of each superhero were released.	Sold on June 16, 2023, as part of a bundle that included a matching poster, a DC x Translink lanyard, and a protective card holder
Elf 20th anniversary	Elf logo	Adult fare	1,200 cards were released.	Sold on December 6, 2023, as part of a bundle that included a matching wooden post card
Elf 20th anniversary	Syrup Bottle	Adult fare	1,200 cards were released.	Sold on December 6, 2023, as part of a bundle that included a matching wooden post card
Elf 20th anniversary	Elf logo, Clausometer, and candy canes	Adult fare	1,200 cards were released.	Sold on December 6, 2023, as part of a bundle that included a matching wooden post card
Elf 20th anniversary	Nutcracker	Adult fare	1,200 cards were released.	Sold on December 6, 2023, as part of a bundle that included a matching wooden post card
Compass Mini – West Coast Express	Blue	Adult fare	4000 adult and 1000 concession products were released.	Released on November 1, 2025, as part of the 30th anniversary celebrations for the West Coast Express. It is shaped like a locomotive and lights up when tapped on a Compass reader.
Compass Mini – West Coast Express	Orange	Concession fare	4000 adult and 1000 concession products were released.	Released on November 1, 2025, as part of the 30th anniversary celebrations for the West Coast Express. It is shaped like a locomotive and lights up when tapped on a Compass reader.
Captain Canuck	Mark I SkyTrain	Adult fare	Unknown	Sold as bundle of card and poster from February 14–16, 2026, at the Fan Expo or from the TransLink store
Captain Canuck	Mark V SkyTrain	Adult fare	Unknown	Sold as bundle of card and poster from February 14–16, 2026, at the Fan Expo or from the TransLink store
Hello Kitty	Hello Kitty	Adult fare	3,000 cards were released.	Sold on April 4, 2026, at the Metropolis at Metrotown grand court as part of a bundle that included a luggage tag.
Hello Kitty	My Melody	Adult fare	3,000 cards were released.	Sold on April 4, 2026, at the Metropolis at Metrotown grand court as part of a bundle that included a luggage tag.
Hello Kitty	Kuromi	Adult fare	3,000 cards were released.	Sold on April 4, 2026, at the Metropolis at Metrotown grand court as part of a bundle that included a luggage tag.
Hello Kitty	Cinnamoroll	Adult fare	3,000 cards were released.	Sold on April 4, 2026, at the Metropolis at Metrotown grand court as part of a bundle that included a luggage tag.
Compass Soccer Mini	Blue	Adult fare	8000 adult and 2000 concession products were released.	Released on June 6, 2026, to commemorate the 2026 FIFA World Cup. It is shaped like a soccer ball.
Compass Soccer Mini	Orange	Concession fare	8000 adult and 2000 concession products were released.	Released on June 6, 2026, to commemorate the 2026 FIFA World Cup. It is shaped like a soccer ball.

== Issues and controversies ==
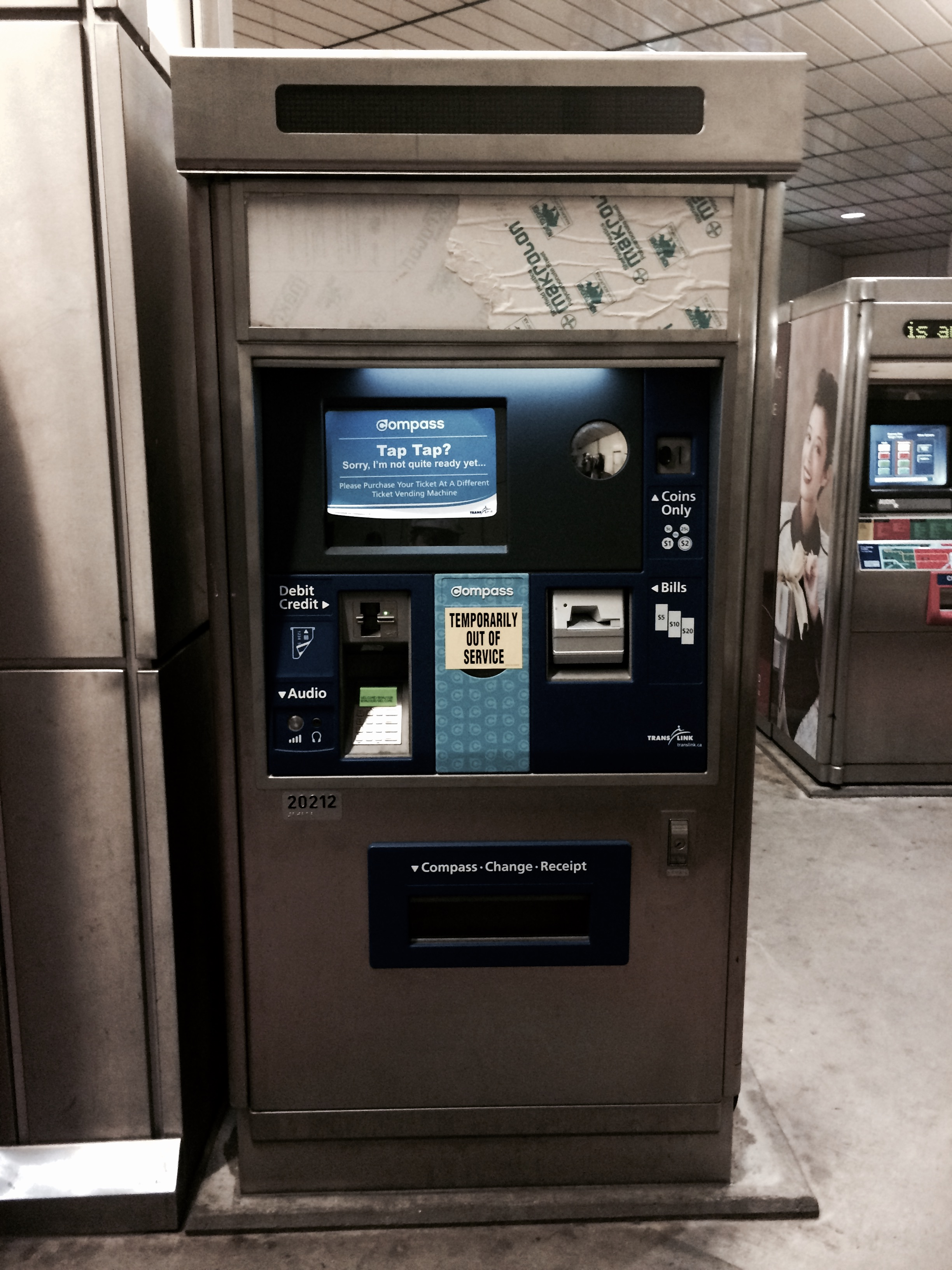
Two-year-old Compass vending machine with both not-yet-in-service sticker and out-of-order sticker

=== Accessibility ===
Even on buses, users with physical handicaps may have difficulty tapping their card; this is even more apparent when they are faced with fare gates, which can completely prevent their access (bus drivers can waive the fare should they choose). The temporary solution was either having transit staff on hand to assist riders with difficulties, or keeping at least one fare gate per station open when staff was not present, but TransLink closed all fare gates on July 25, 2016, and required those with disabilities which prevent them from using fare gates to contact TransLink personnel for assistance. In January 2018, TransLink launched its Universal Fare Gate Access Program. Participants in the program are provided an RFID card that automatically opens the fare gate when the card comes in range and closes the gate once the customer passes through.

=== Transfers from buses ===
Bus drivers are still required to issue paper transfers for cash fares, which are incompatible with the Compass system, requiring passengers to purchase additional Compass Tickets in order to transfer to SkyTrain or SeaBus. TransLink claimed it would cost an additional $25 million to provide fare box upgrades on buses enabling them to dispense and accept Compass Tickets.

In the original full tap-in/tap-out design, a multi-zone bus trip could be completed for a single zone fare by tapping out within the first zone of travel but remaining on the bus. This fault was not publicly acknowledged by the administration until system testing in September 2013. Regardless of the loophole, Transit police or designated transit security fare enforcement officers may issue a $173 fine if they catch riders without adequate fare in a Fare Paid Zone. Furthermore, the tapping out process on buses was reported to be slow, and failure to record a passenger's tapping out may have resulted in the passenger being charged for travelling through three zones when in fact they only travelled through one or two zones.

On October 5, 2015, all bus travel throughout TransLink's system became 1-zone travel and bus passengers are neither required nor expected to tap out.

=== Delay in deployment and cost overrun ===
Despite a planned roll out in 2013, the full implementation of the system continues to be delayed by ongoing problems related to the bus tapping; this has been a serious setback for TransLink as the entire system had been supposed to be operational by 2013. The time frame announcement was pushed to late 2014, before TransLink changed its Compass Timeline website in late 2014 to remove statements promising a full Compass roll-out in late 2014, only stating that post-secondary students will receive cards in the summer of 2015, replacing the U-Pass BC, with full deployment not re-announced until September 2015.

In addition, TransLink confirmed in October 2013 that the cost overrun for the Compass card system had reached $23 million due to delay related inflation and unanticipated scope creep. The Compass card system had been budgeted at $171 million, but had risen to $194 million.
