= Dinsmore Airport (California) =

- IATA: none; ICAO: none; FAA LID: D63

Summary
- Airport type: Public
- Operator: Humboldt County
- Location: Dinsmore, California
- Elevation AMSL: 2,375.9 ft (724.2 m)
- Coordinates: 40°29′31″N 123°35′52″W
- Interactive map of Dinsmore Airport

Runways
Direction	Length		Surface
Direction	ft	m	Surface
9/27	2,510	765	Asphalt

Dinsmore Airport (FAA LID: D63), formerly Q25, is a public airport located 1 mile (1.6 km) east of Dinsmore, serving Humboldt County, California. The airport is mostly used for general aviation.

== Facilities ==
Dinsmore Airport covers 23 acres (9.3 ha; 0.036 sq mi) and has one runway, 2,510 feet (770 m) by 48 feet (15 m) long with an asphalt surface.

== Use ==
One aircraft and one ultralight are based at the field, an average of 31 operations per week with 62% transient and 38% local general aviation operations in the year before 31 December 2011.
