= Burkeville, British Columbia =

Neighbourhood in Richmond, British Columbia, Canada

Burkeville
- Neighbourhood
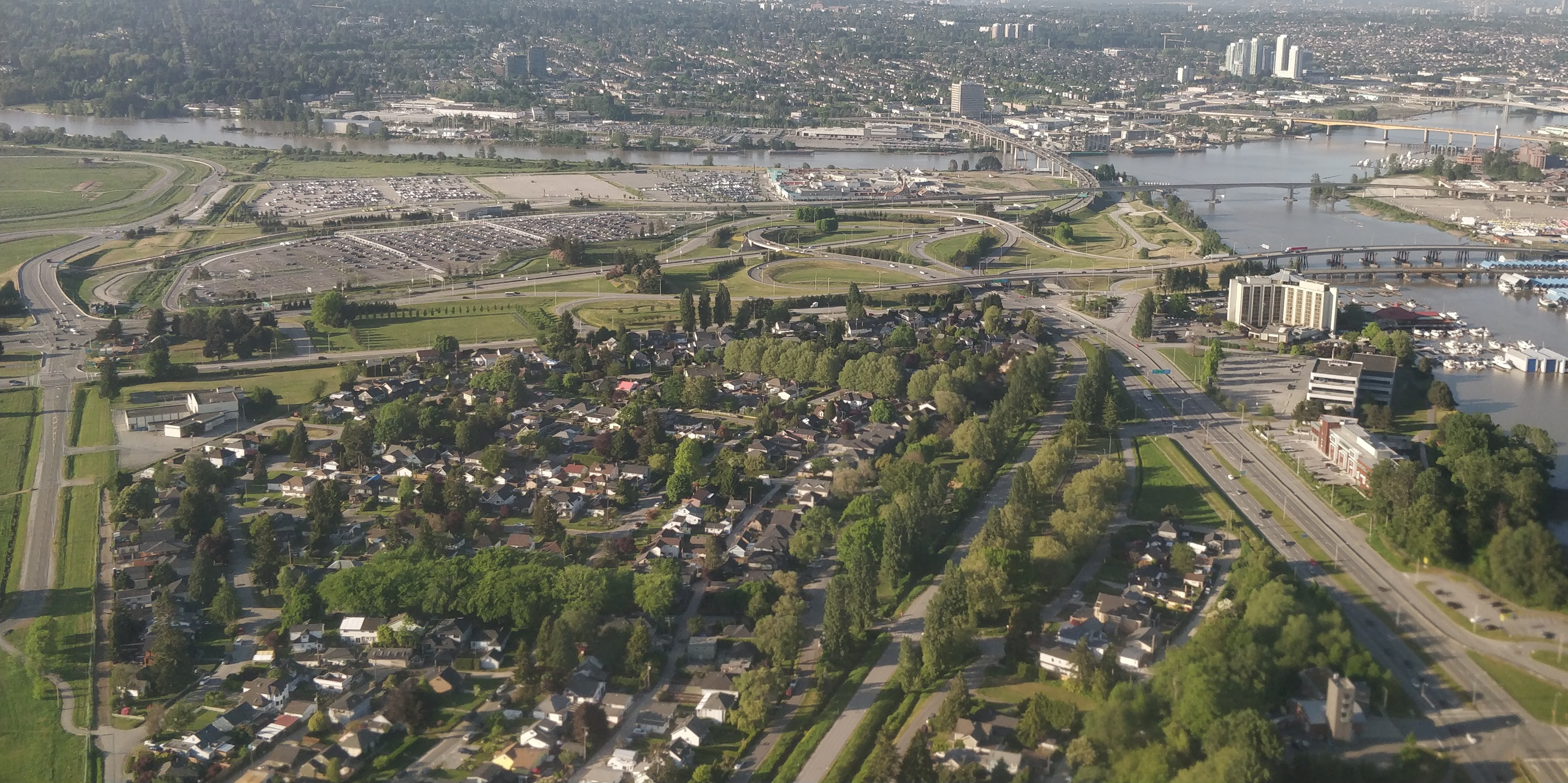
- Aerial View of Burkeville

- Location in Metro Vancouver
- Coordinates: 49°11′20″N 123°08′47″W
- Country: Canada
- Province: British Columbia
- City: Richmond

Burkeville, British Columbia is a neighbourhood located on Sea Island in Richmond, British Columbia, Canada.

The former village is the only residential area on Sea Island, which is primarily covered by the Vancouver International Airport.

== History ==
=== Development ===
The village was constructed from 1941 to 1943 by Wartime Housing Limited, the crown corporation responsible for the development of homes for workers in wartime industries. With rubber shortages and restrictions on gasoline usage, the government considered the community essential in order to house the employees of the Boeing Aircraft Factory close to their workplace. The land upon which the neighbourhood is built was expropriated from farmers who lived in the area.

In an effort to expedite the construction process, the entire village was constructed with only three different floor plans for the original 328 houses. Houses were between 700 and 900 square feet, containing either four or six rooms depending on the layout, and came in three different exterior colours. The homes lacked lawns, garages, insulation, and furnaces, relying on wood or coal burning kitchen stoves for heat. The first residents moved into the neighbourhood in January 1944.

The community would later be named Burkeville, after then-President of Boeing Canada, Stanley Burke (1889-1959). The street names have an aeronautical theme, many of which bear the names of airplane manufacturers, including Boeing Avenue, Douglas Crescent, and Handley Avenue, or of specific aircraft models, such as Hudson Avenue, Catalina Crescent, and Lysander Lane.

=== Politics ===
From its inception in 1944 until 1947, Burkeville was not considered a part of Richmond nor Vancouver. Initially, the Richmond Council was averse to absorbing the new village, due to concerns that pre-existing landowners would be saddled with an increased property tax to cover the costs of services required by Burkeville. It was even suggested that Burkeville become an independent village, leaving the federal Government responsible for the associated costs. The city council debated this issue from before the development was built until after the war had ended.

Finally, in May 1947, a bylaw was passed by Richmond Council to incorporate Burkeville into the municipality of Richmond. Subsequently, the city took possession of the neighbourhood's houses and committed to resurfacing the community's roads and building an elementary school. The homes were then sold back to existing tenants and veterans returning to the country.

=== Sea Island School ===
After the war, residents of Burkeville quickly began demanding an elementary school to accommodate their growing families and remove the need for children to be bused off of the island for education. The grand opening of the Sea Island School took place on October 17, 1947. The school's name was chosen by then-Reeve of Richmond, Rudy Grauer; the other proposed options were Princess Elizabeth School and Frasea School. The facility was a cottage-style building located on Wellington Crescent, with six classrooms on the ground floor.

== Notable people ==
Burkeville was the hometown of aviation pioneer Dan McIvor.

== See also ==
- Strawberry box houses
