= Delta, British Columbia =

City in Canada

Delta
- City
- City of Delta
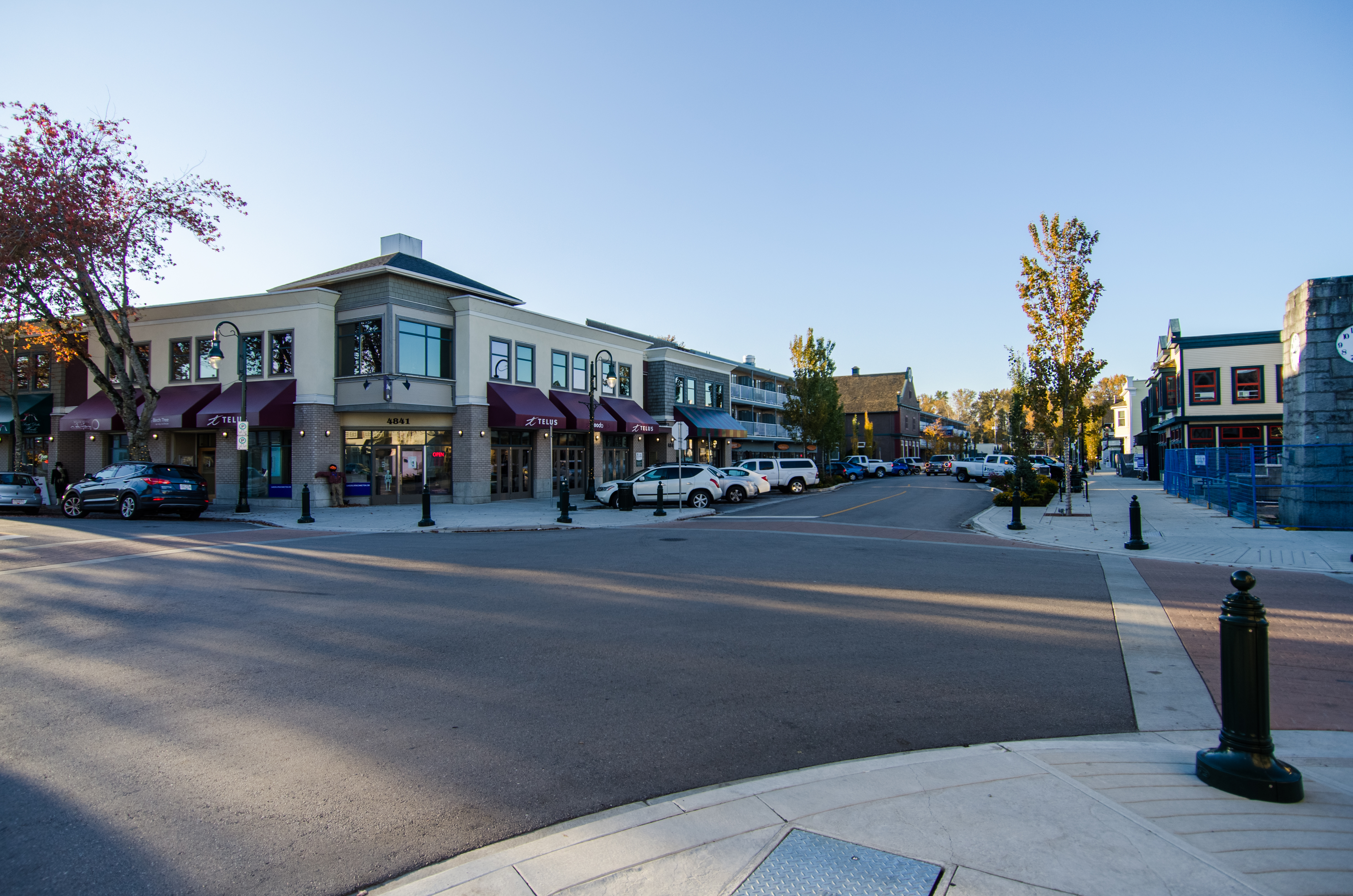
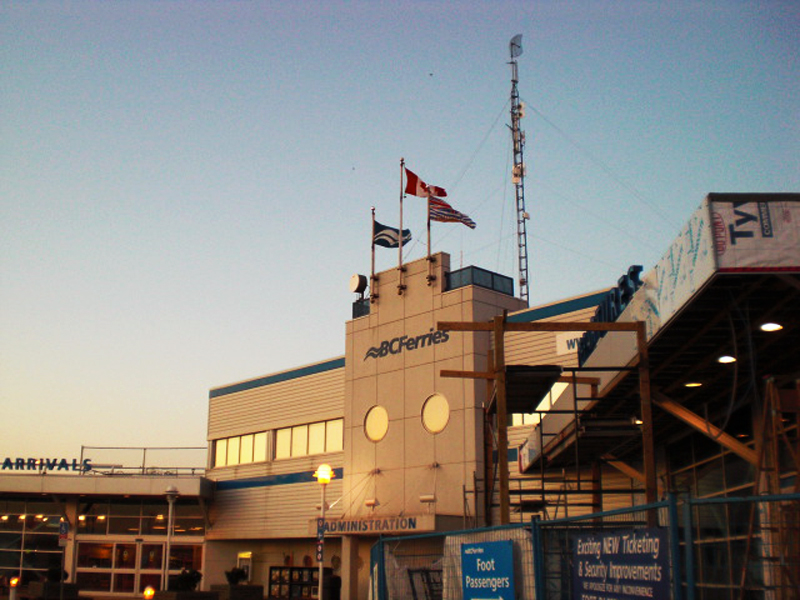
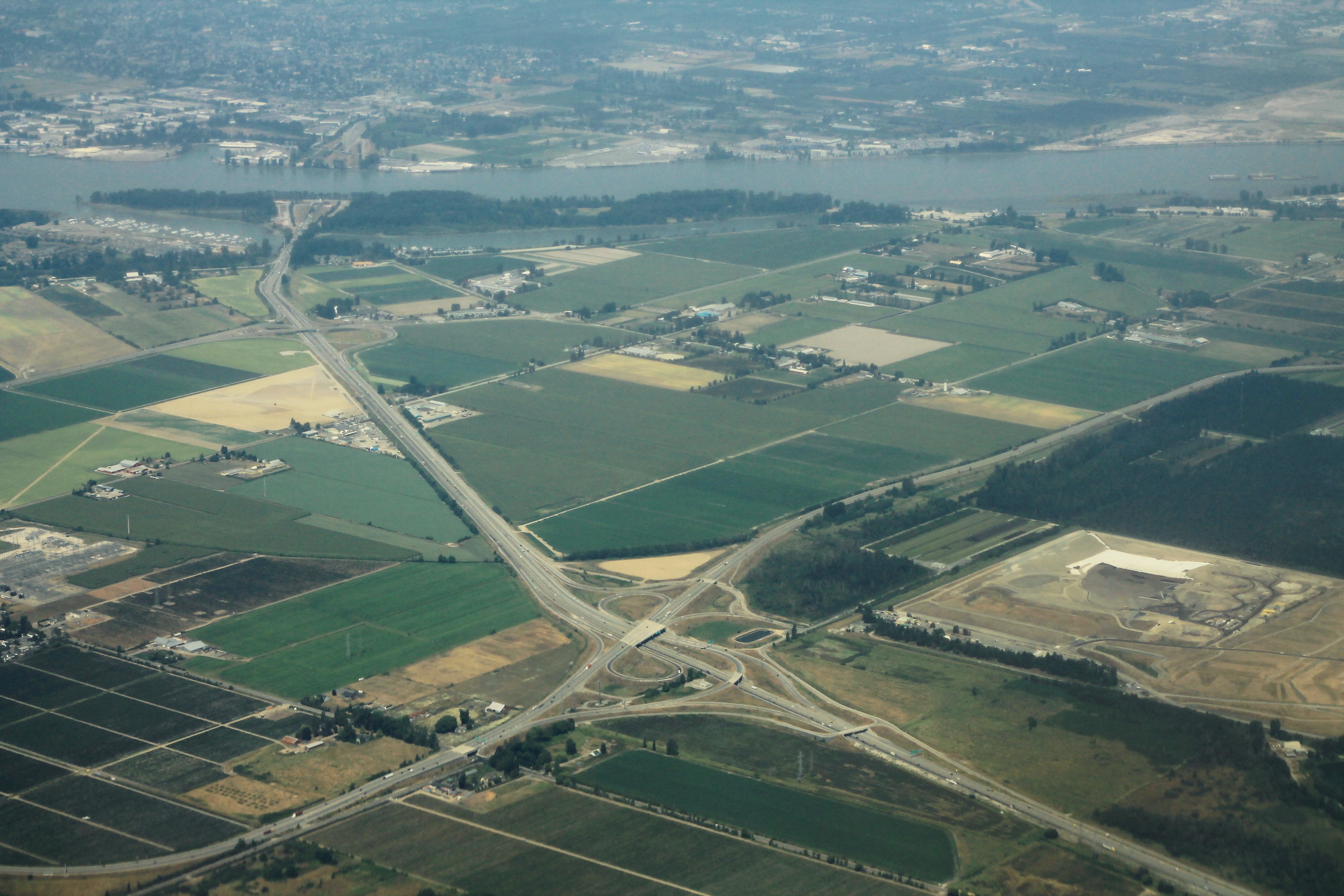
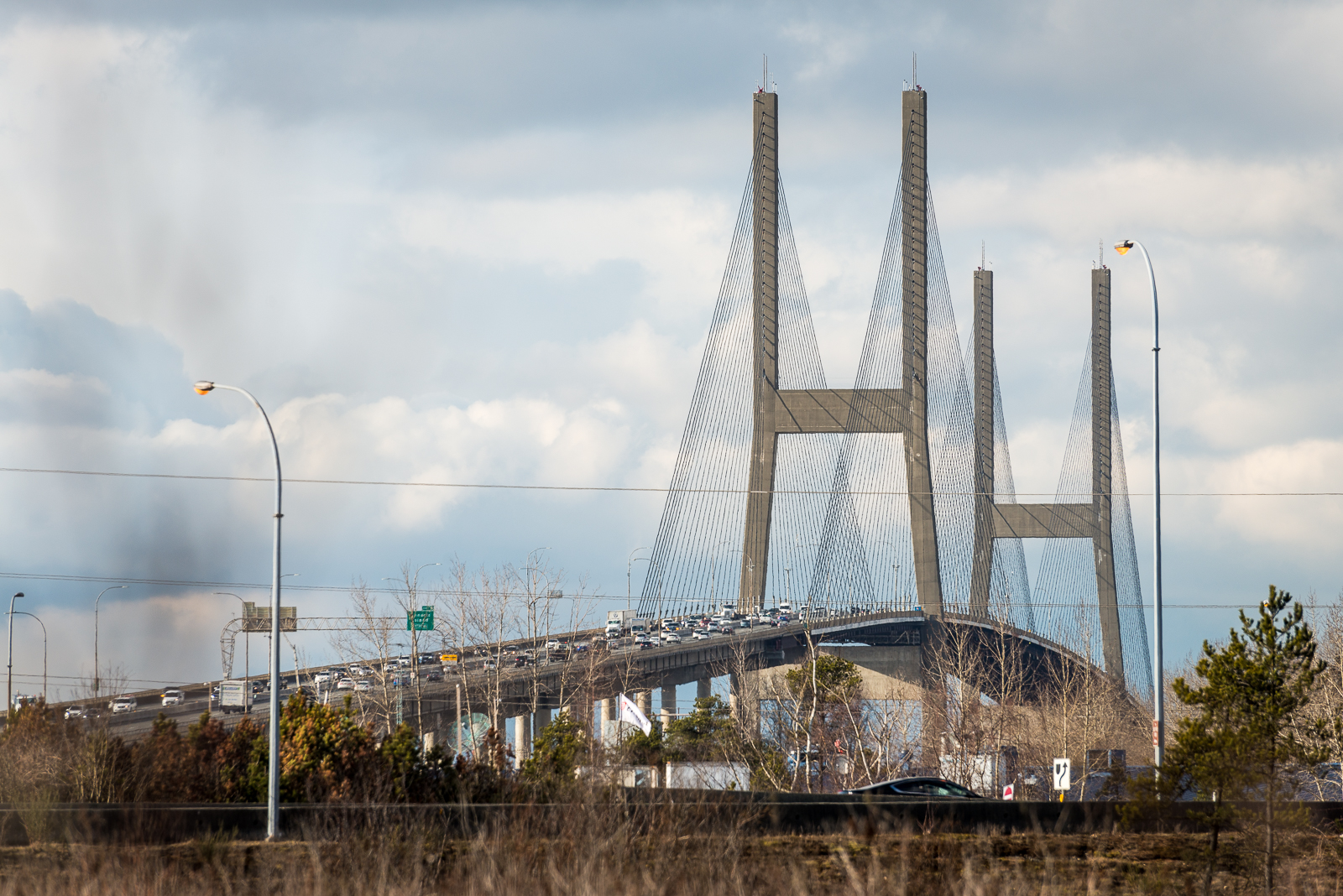
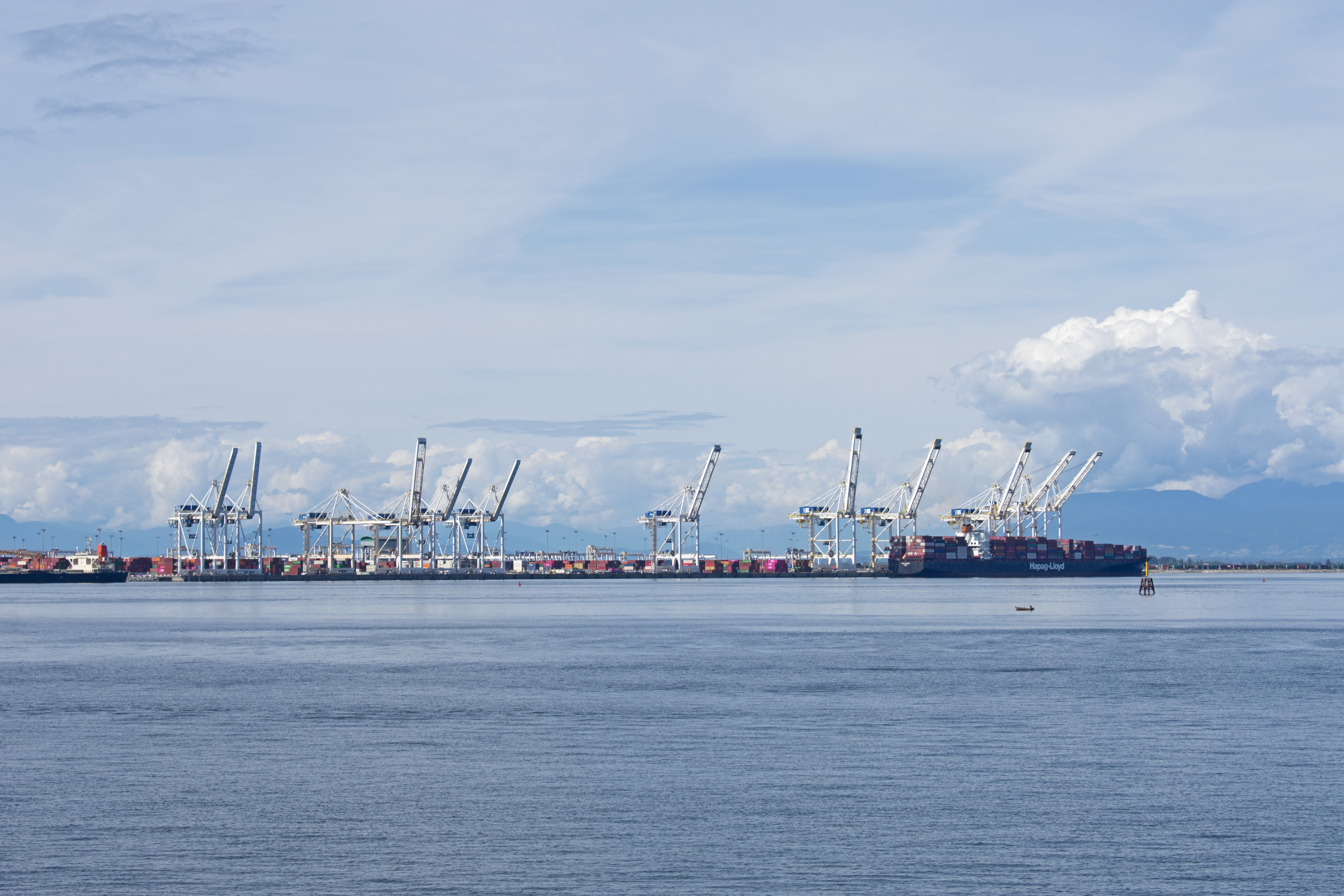
- Bridge Street and Delta Street Tsawwassen ferry terminal Aerial View of Farmland Alex Fraser Bridge Roberts Bank Superport

- Flag Coat of arms Logo
- Motto: Ours to preserve by hand and heart
- Location of Delta in Metro Vancouver
- Coordinates: 49°05′05″N 123°03′31″W
- Country: Canada
- Province: British Columbia
- Regional district: Metro Vancouver
- Incorporated as a district municipality: November 10, 1879
- Incorporated as a city: September 22, 2017
- Seats of government: Delta City Hall; North Delta Centre for the Arts

Government
  - Type: Mayor-council government
  - Body: Delta City Council
  - Mayor: Melissa Granum (Delta First)
  - City Council: List of councillors: Rod Binder; Daniel Boisvert; Jessie Dosanjh; Alicia Guichon; Jennifer Johal; Dylan Kruger
  - MP: Jill McKnight (Liberal)
  - MLAs: Monica Mohan (CPBC); Ian Paton (CPBC)

Area
  - Total: 364 km^{2} (141 sq mi)
  - Land: 179.66 km^{2} (69.37 sq mi)
- Elevation: 10 m (33 ft)

Population (2021)
  - Total: 108,455
  - Estimate (2023): 116,610
  - Rank: 52nd in Canada
  - Density: 603.7/km^{2} (1,564/sq mi)
- Demonym: Deltan
- Time zone: UTC−07:00 (Pacific Time)
- Forward sortation area: V4C – V4G, V4K – V4M
- Area codes: 604, 778, 236, 672
- Website: www.delta.ca

Delta is a city in the Lower Mainland region of British Columbia, Canada, and part of Greater Vancouver. Located on the Fraser Lowland south of Fraser River's south arm, it is bordered by the city of Richmond on Lulu Island to the north, New Westminster to the northeast, Surrey to the east, the Boundary Bay and the American pene-exclave Point Roberts to the south, and the Strait of Georgia to the west.

Encompassing the nearby Annacis Island, Deas Island and Westham Island, Delta is mostly rural and officially composed of three distinct communities: North Delta, Ladner and Tsawwassen.

== History ==
Prior to European settlement, Delta's flatlands and coastal shores were inhabited by the Tsawwassen First Nation of the Coast Salish. The land was first sighted by Europeans in 1791, when Spanish explorer Lieutenant Francisco de Eliza mistook the area for an island and named it "Isla de Cepeda". The first European settler in Delta was James Kennedy who pre-empted 135 acres in what later became Annieville in February 1860. Thomas and William Ladner, began farming the area named after them in 1868. Farming and fishing helped the community grow quickly over the next few decades. In 1879, the area was a municipality, named "the Corporation of Delta", and the village of Ladner was made as its administrative centre.

Due to its geography, Delta was a relatively isolated community. The completion of the George Massey Tunnel in 1959 linking Ladner to Richmond and Vancouver along with the opening, in 1960, of the Tsawwassen Ferry Terminal and the Highway 99 being rerouted from the King George Highway in Surrey in 1962 to a new route through Delta, ended Delta's isolation and resulted in a massive 400% population growth over the next 20 years. The 1986 completion of the Alex Fraser Bridge connecting North Delta to New Westminster and Vancouver also helped Delta's growth.

On 22 September 2017, at the request of Delta's council, the Government of British Columbia changed the name and classification of the Corporation of Delta to the City of Delta.

== Neighbourhoods ==
Delta comprises three distinct, geographically separate communities:

- North Delta (pop: 60,769) is home to over half of Delta's population. It is a largely suburban area in north-east Delta bordered by the Burns Bog and Surrey.
- Ladner (pop: 23,047) is a 19th-century fishing village in northwest Delta that has expanded into a suburb. Fishing and farming are important industries. Ladner Trunk Road is its main street.
- Tsawwassen (pop: 22,160) is a suburban community in the southwest Delta that calls itself the sunniest place in Metro Vancouver. Luxury waterfront homes line Tsawwassen's coast. Tsawwassen is also home to the busy Tsawwassen Ferry Terminal which links the mainland to Vancouver Island and the Gulf Islands. Tsawwassen, together with Ladner are also known as South Delta.

== Demographics ==
Historical populations
Year	Pop.	±%
1921	2,839	—
1931	3,709	+30.6%
1941	4,287	+15.6%
1951	6,701	+56.3%
1956	8,752	+30.6%
1961	14,597	+66.8%
1966	20,664	+41.6%
1971	45,860	+121.9%
1976	64,492	+40.6%
1981	74,692	+15.8%
1986	79,610	+6.6%
1991	88,978	+11.8%
1996	95,411	+7.2%
2001	96,950	+1.6%
2006	96,723	−0.2%
2011	99,863	+3.2%
2016	102,238	+2.4%
2021	108,455	+6.1%
Statistics Canada

In the 2021 Census of Population conducted by Statistics Canada, Delta had a population of 108,455 living in 38,058 of its 39,736 total private dwellings, a change of 6.1% from its 2016 population of 102,238. With a land area of 179.66 km^{2} (69.37 sq mi), it had a population density of 603.7/km^{2} (1,563.5/sq mi) in 2021.

In 2011, the median age was 42.8 years old, which is slightly higher than the national median age of 40.6 years old. There were 35,781 private dwellings with an occupancy rate of 97.1%. According to the 2011 National Household Survey, the median value of a dwelling in Delta is $562,181 which is significantly higher than the national average of $280,552. The median household income (after taxes) in Delta is $71,590, quite higher than the national average at $54,089.

=== Ethnicity ===
As of 2021, Delta's population is 108,455. About 45% of Delta's population are visible minorities, of which there are approximately 28,000 South Asians, 9,700 Chinese people, and 3,700 Filipinos. There are also about 3,180 Indigenous peoples or 3% of the total population, some from Tsawwassen First Nation, who still hold a fraction of their former traditional territories; the Tsawwassen Lands at the mouth of the Fraser River, which is shared with the Hwlitsum First Nation from the Gulf Islands. Forming over one-quarter (26.1%) of the population, Delta has the fourth largest municipal South Asian population in British Columbia after neighbouring Vancouver, Surrey and Abbotsford.

Panethnic groups in the City of Delta (2001−2021)
Panethnic group	2021		2016		2011		2006		2001	
Panethnic group	Pop.	%	Pop.	%	Pop.	%	Pop.	%	Pop.	%
European (Note: Statistic includes all persons that did not make part of a visible minority or an indigenous identity.)	55,465	51.71%	61,835	61.32%	66,630	67.48%	68,400	71.19%	72,375	75.1%
South Asian	27,990	26.09%	20,485	20.31%	17,030	17.25%	14,220	14.8%	12,035	12.49%
East Asian (Note: Statistic includes total responses of "Chinese", "Korean", and "Japanese" under visible minority section on census.)	11,040	10.29%	9,320	9.24%	7,065	7.16%	7,280	7.58%	6,675	6.93%
Southeast Asian (Note: Statistic includes total responses of "Filipino" and "Southeast Asian" under visible minority section on census.)	4,420	4.12%	3,240	3.21%	3,165	3.21%	2,280	2.37%	2,060	2.14%
Indigenous	3,180	2.96%	2,710	2.69%	2,290	2.32%	1,700	1.77%	1,495	1.55%
African	1,095	1.02%	795	0.79%	595	0.6%	495	0.52%	610	0.63%
Latin American	1,035	0.96%	815	0.81%	710	0.72%	710	0.74%	490	0.51%
Middle Eastern (Note: Statistic includes total responses of "West Asian" and "Arab" under visible minority section on census.)	890	0.83%	515	0.51%	240	0.24%	280	0.29%	220	0.23%
Other/multiracial (Note: Statistic includes total responses of "Visible minority, n.i.e." and "Multiple visible minorities" under visible minority section on census.)	2,140	1.99%	1,120	1.11%	1,010	1.02%	715	0.74%	420	0.44%
Total responses	107,270	98.91%	100,845	98.64%	98,740	98.88%	96,075	99.33%	96,370	99.4%
Total population	108,455	100%	102,238	100%	99,863	100%	96,723	100%	96,950	100%
Note: Totals greater than 100% due to multiple origin responses

Panethnic groups in the City of Delta neighbourhoods (2021 Canadian census)
Panethnic group	City of Delta		North Delta neighbourhood		Ladner neighbourhood		Tsawwassen neighbourhood		Rural & Industrial areas	
Panethnic group	Pop.	%	Pop.	%	Pop.	%	Pop.	%	Pop.	%
European	55,465	51.71%	21,035	34.71%	15,780	68.94%	17,340	79.41%	1,465	74.18%
South Asian	27,990	26.09%	24,885	41.07%	2,045	8.93%	705	3.23%	355	17.97%
East Asian	11,040	10.29%	6,515	10.75%	2,515	10.99%	1,895	8.68%	80	4.05%
Southeast Asian	4,420	4.12%	2,985	4.93%	860	3.76%	550	2.52%	0	0%
Indigenous	3,180	2.96%	1,555	2.57%	850	3.71%	720	3.3%	55	2.78%
African	1,095	1.02%	750	1.24%	195	0.85%	135	0.62%	0	0%
Latin American	1,035	0.96%	675	1.11%	170	0.74%	180	0.82%	20	1.01%
Middle Eastern	890	0.83%	705	1.16%	90	0.39%	60	0.27%	0	0%
Other/multiracial	2,140	1.99%	1,490	2.46%	385	1.68%	250	1.14%	0	0%
Total responses	107,270	98.91%	60,595	99.71%	22,890	99.32%	21,835	98.53%	1,975	79.67%
Total population	108,455	100%	60,769	100%	23,047	100%	22,160	100%	2,479	100%
The North Delta neighbourhood includes the following 11 census tracts: 9330162.01, 9330162.02, 9330162.04, 9330162.05, 9330162.06, 9330163.01, 9330163.04, 9330163.05, 9330163.06, 9330163.07, and 9330163.08. The Ladner neighbourhood includes the following four census tracts: 9330161.02, 9330161.03, 9330161.05, and 9330161.06. The Tsawwassen neighbourhood includes the following four census tracts: 9330160.01, 9330160.02, 9330160.03, and 9330160.04. The rural & industrial areas include the following census tract: 9330161.09.

=== Religion ===
According to the 2021 census, religious groups in Delta included:

- Irreligion (42,990 persons or 40.1%)
- Christianity (35,025 persons or 32.7%)
- Sikhism (19,235 persons or 17.9%)
- Hinduism (4,195 persons or 3.9%)
- Islam (3,265 persons or 3.0%)
- Buddhism (1,450 persons or 1.4%)
- Judaism (475 persons or 0.4%)
- Indigenous spirituality (20 persons or 0%)

Religious groups in the City of Delta (1991−2021)
Religious group	2021 Canadian census		2011 Canadian census		2001 Canadian census		1991 Canadian census	
Religious group	Pop.	%	Pop.	%	Pop.	%	Pop.	%
Irreligion	42,990	40.08%	36,635	37.1%	28,440	29.51%	21,935	24.83%
Christianity	35,025	32.65%	44,335	44.9%	54,385	56.44%	60,305	68.27%
Sikhism	19,235	17.93%	10,495	10.63%	8,255	8.57%	3,695	4.18%
Hinduism	4,195	3.91%	3,010	3.05%	1,820	1.89%	930	1.05%
Islam	3,265	3.04%	2,015	2.04%	1,330	1.38%	480	0.54%
Buddhism	1,450	1.35%	1,285	1.3%	1,500	1.56%	445	0.5%
Judaism	475	0.44%	420	0.43%	310	0.32%	190	0.22%
Indigenous spirituality	20	0.02%	35	0.04%	20	0.02%	—N/a	—N/a
Other	610	0.57%	520	0.53%	305	0.32%	360	0.41%
Total responses	107,270	98.91%	98,740	98.88%	96,365	99.4%	88,330	99.27%
Total population	108,455	100%	99,863	100%	96,950	100%	88,978	100%

== Geography ==
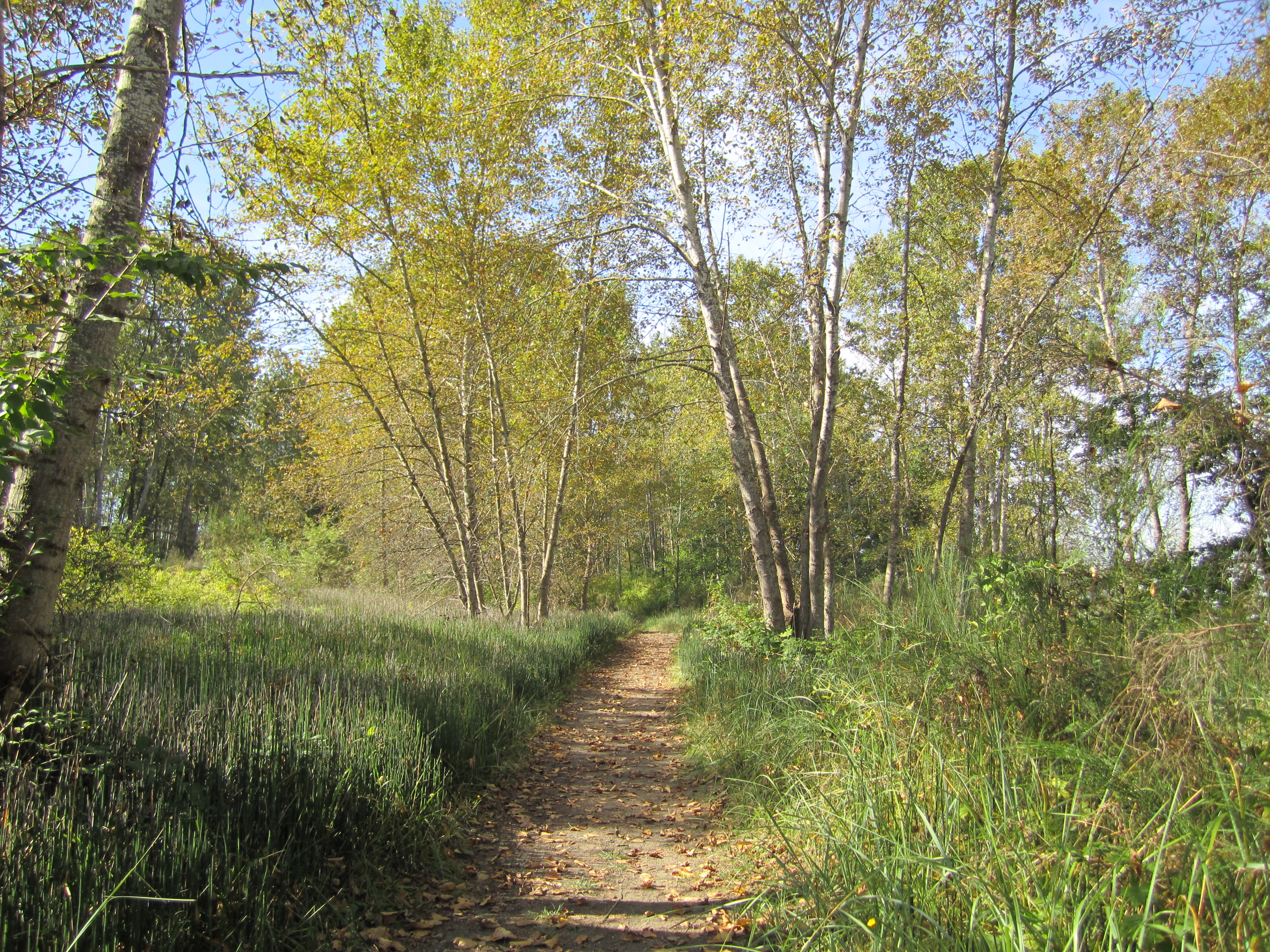
A trail on Deas Island in late September

Delta is located 27 km (17 mi) south of Vancouver and 22 km (14 mi) north of the Canada–US border at Peace Arch, Surrey. It is bordered by water on three sides: The Fraser River to the north, the Georgia Strait to the west and Boundary Bay to the south. At 364 km^{2} (141 sq mi), Delta is the largest municipality in the GVRD; the second largest is its neighbour to the east, Surrey, at 317.4 km^{2} (122.5 sq mi).

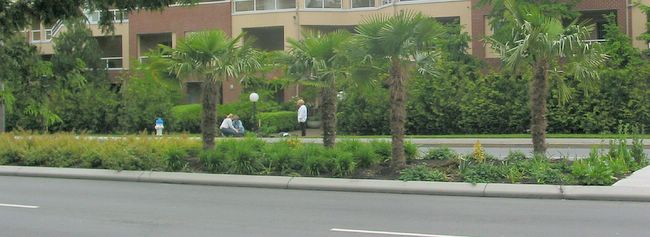
Trachycarpus fortunei windmill palms line some streets in Tsawwassen

Delta's flat, fertile land has made it one of the most important agricultural areas in Greater Vancouver. The Agricultural Land Reserve regulations preserve most of this land for agricultural use, preventing its conversion to suburban housing. North Delta is also home to the Burns Bog, 40 km^{2} (15 sq mi) of natural wetlands that are important for wildlife.

Delta includes Annacis Island, an industrial island reached via the Alex Fraser Bridge, which connects Delta with Richmond and New Westminster. Delta also includes a peninsula on the east side of the Fraser River at Delta's northern city limits, which is only accessible via Surrey.

=== Climate ===
Delta is known for its relatively dry and sunny climate compared with other locations in Metro Vancouver. For example, it receives nearly 40% (927.5 mm (36.52 in) from 1981 to 2010) less precipitation than downtown Vancouver (1,474.9 mm (58.07 in) at Vancouver Harbour CS from 1971 to 2000) and just over half of that of North Vancouver (1,805.6 mm (71.09 in) at North Vancouver 2nd Narrows from 1981 to 2010). It has a warm-summer Mediterranean climate (Köppen Csb) with cooler summers and milder winters than other areas on the Canada–U.S. border, and features some of the mildest winters and lowest diurnal temperature variation in Canada.

Climate data for Delta / Tsawwassen (Delta Tsawwassen Beach) Climate ID: 1102425; coordinates 49°00′39″N 125°05′36″W; elevation: 2.4 m (7 ft 10 in); 1981-2010 normals
Month	Jan	Feb	Mar	Apr	May	Jun	Jul	Aug	Sep	Oct	Nov	Dec	Year
Record high °C (°F)	14.5 (58.1)	15.5 (59.9)	19.0 (66.2)	23.0 (73.4)	27.0 (80.6)	29.0 (84.2)	31.0 (87.8)	28.5 (83.3)	28.5 (83.3)	23.0 (73.4)	15.5 (59.9)	14.5 (58.1)	31.0 (87.8)
Mean daily maximum °C (°F)	7.2 (45.0)	8.2 (46.8)	10.5 (50.9)	13.5 (56.3)	16.8 (62.2)	19.6 (67.3)	21.7 (71.1)	21.5 (70.7)	18.4 (65.1)	13.4 (56.1)	9.5 (49.1)	7.1 (44.8)	13.9 (57.0)
Daily mean °C (°F)	5.1 (41.2)	5.8 (42.4)	7.7 (45.9)	10.4 (50.7)	13.4 (56.1)	16.0 (60.8)	17.9 (64.2)	17.9 (64.2)	15.3 (59.5)	11.2 (52.2)	7.5 (45.5)	5.1 (41.2)	11.1 (52.0)
Mean daily minimum °C (°F)	2.9 (37.2)	3.3 (37.9)	4.9 (40.8)	7.2 (45.0)	9.8 (49.6)	12.3 (54.1)	14.0 (57.2)	14.3 (57.7)	12.0 (53.6)	8.9 (48.0)	5.5 (41.9)	3.0 (37.4)	8.2 (46.8)
Record low °C (°F)	−9.5 (14.9)	−12.0 (10.4)	−4.5 (23.9)	0.0 (32.0)	3.5 (38.3)	7.0 (44.6)	9.5 (49.1)	10.0 (50.0)	6.5 (43.7)	−1.5 (29.3)	−9.0 (15.8)	−11.5 (11.3)	−12.0 (10.4)
Average precipitation mm (inches)	134.6 (5.30)	80.4 (3.17)	78.5 (3.09)	67.9 (2.67)	52.2 (2.06)	42.6 (1.68)	30.5 (1.20)	28.7 (1.13)	39.8 (1.57)	101.3 (3.99)	145.1 (5.71)	125.9 (4.96)	927.5 (36.52)
Average rainfall mm (inches)	124.3 (4.89)	77.1 (3.04)	77.0 (3.03)	67.9 (2.67)	52.2 (2.06)	42.6 (1.68)	30.5 (1.20)	28.7 (1.13)	39.8 (1.57)	101.0 (3.98)	142.7 (5.62)	116.3 (4.58)	900.1 (35.45)
Average snowfall cm (inches)	10.4 (4.1)	3.3 (1.3)	1.6 (0.6)	0.0 (0.0)	0.0 (0.0)	0.0 (0.0)	0.0 (0.0)	0.0 (0.0)	0.0 (0.0)	0.3 (0.1)	2.4 (0.9)	9.6 (3.8)	27.6 (10.8)
Average precipitation days (≥ 0.2 mm)	18.5	14.3	15.5	14.2	11.7	9.7	6.2	5.6	6.7	15.2	18.8	18.6	155
Average rainy days (≥ 0.2 mm)	17.7	13.9	15.5	14.2	11.7	9.7	6.2	5.6	6.7	15.2	18.5	17.5	152.4
Average snowy days (≥ 0.2 cm)	1.6	1.0	0.5	0.0	0.0	0.0	0.0	0.0	0.0	0.1	0.6	1.6	5.4
Source: Environment and Climate Change Canada

== Government and politics ==
Delta is governed by the Delta City Council, led by a Mayor and six Councillors, elected for four-year terms, and there is also an elected school board. The current mayor is George Harvie. Unlike most communities in Canada, but like Vancouver and Richmond, Delta has a system of locally based election slates such as TriDelta, IDEA, One Delta, Delta Residents Association, Delta Connect, DIVA, Independents Working For You, and Achieving For Delta.

In the House of Commons of Canada, Delta is part of the Delta electoral district. As of the 2025 Federal general election, Delta's seat is held by Jill McKnight of the Liberal Party. In the 2024 provincial general election, the North Delta seat went to Ravi Kahlon of the British Columbia New Democratic Party while the South Delta seat went to Ian Paton of BC Conservative Party.

Delta, unlike most Lower Mainland municipalities, has its own police department.

Former Delta mayor Lois Jackson served from 1999 to 2018 and since 1973 has had a seat on the Delta Council. Jackson was elected to council again in 2018.

== Power ==
In Delta is BC Hydro's Arnott Substation, the mainland terminal of the southern AC transmission connections providing power to Vancouver Island, and the former converter station for the HVDC Vancouver Island circuits.

== Transportation ==
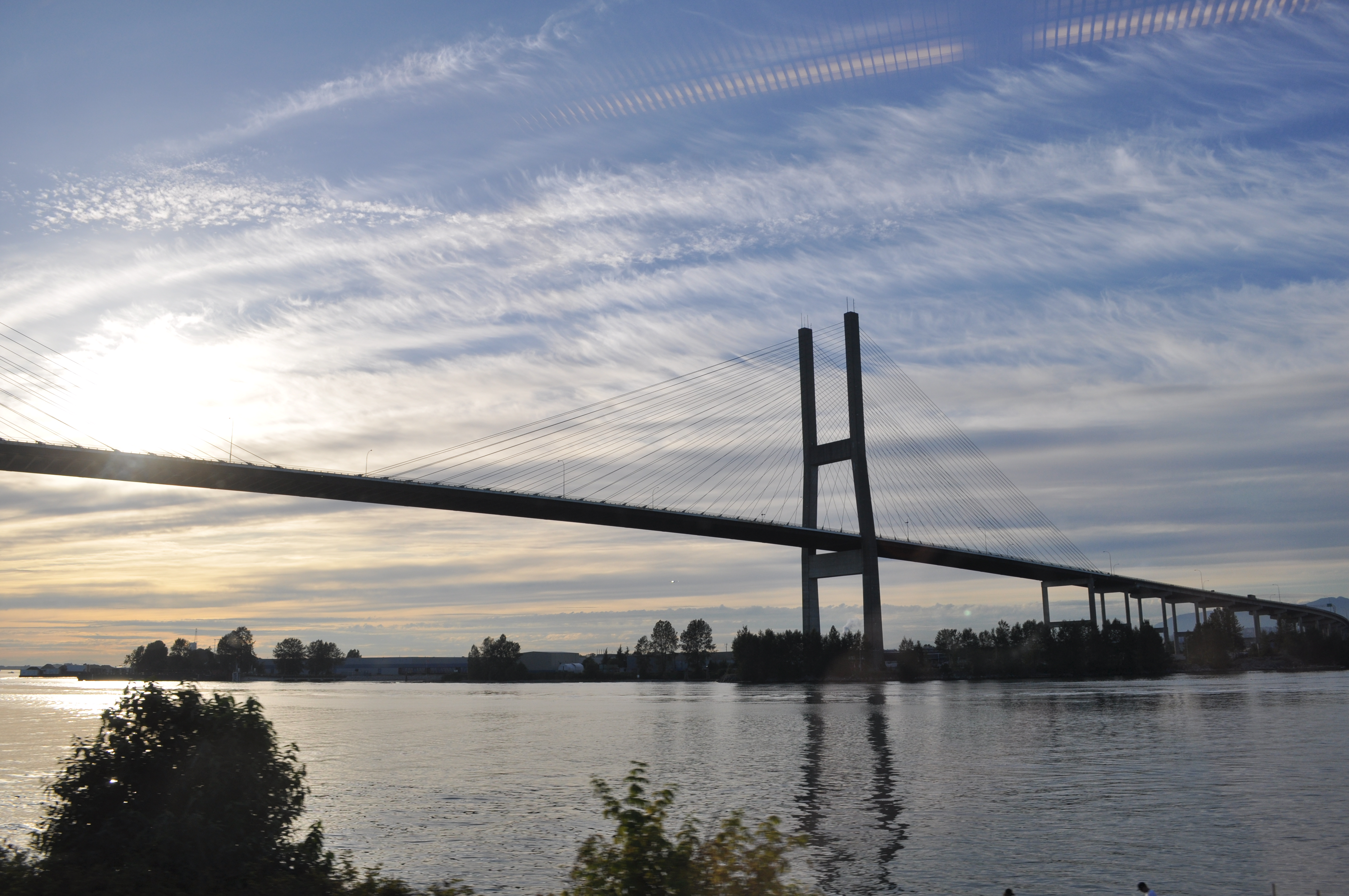
The Alex Fraser Bridge links Delta to New Westminster and Richmond.

- Public transportation in Delta is a bus system provided by TransLink. There is no rapid transit system in Delta, though the SkyTrain system in Surrey comes within 3 km (1.9 mi) of the city's borders.
- Delta is a major transportation hub for the Lower Mainland. Most vehicles leaving Vancouver for the United States pass through Delta's borders. Many vehicles destined for Vancouver Island use the Tsawwassen ferry terminal in Delta.
- Highway 99 links Richmond to Delta via the George Massey Tunnel, built in 1959. North Delta is linked to New Westminster and Richmond by Highway 91 and the massive Alex Fraser Bridge (opened in 1986). Delta is linked to Surrey, Langley, and all points eastward by Highway 10. Traffic congestion during rush hour is quite common, although improvements are being made to Highway 91 interchanges at 72 Ave to remove a traffic light as well as the ramps from Nordel Way.
- Highway 17 in Delta provides a connection to the Tsawwassen B.C. Ferry terminal, which provides car ferry connections to Vancouver Island and the Gulf Islands. In December 2013, north of the current junction with Deltaport Way, Highway 17 will be rerouted upon completion of the "South Fraser Perimeter Road", and will primarily run parallel to River Road through Tilbury and North Delta to all points east. The remaining stretch of Highway 17 north of that point will be renamed Highway 17A.
- River Road is also another connector through the municipality. River Road starts in Surrey and heads westbound through North Delta, under the Alex Fraser Bridge, north of Burns Bog, and then terminates at 62B Street, which then turns into Highway 17A.
- Like River Road, the western communities of "South Delta" (Ladner and Tsawwassen) are linked to North Delta and communities to the east by Ladner Trunk Road; east of its crossover of Highway 91, the road becomes Highway 10.
- 56th Street is another major artery in the community, bisecting the Tsawwassen region; it is the only road leading into the community of Point Roberts, south of the Canada–US border.
- Delta is also home to Boundary Bay Airport, Canada's seventh busiest airport by aircraft movements. Boundary Bay Airport is primarily used for private aircraft, commercial charters, and flying lessons.

=== Major highways ===
- Highway 10
- Highway 17
- Highway 17A
- Highway 91
- Highway 99

== Health ==
Delta is the westernmost community served by Fraser Health Authority which operates Delta Hospital in Ladner and also funds home and community care. The Delta Hospice Society operates a facility near to the hospital.

== Education ==
Delta Public Schools operates Anglophone public schools in the city.

The Conseil scolaire francophone de la Colombie-Britannique operates one Francophone primary school in that city: école du Bois-joli.

== Sports and recreation ==
Delta has many minor sports teams in ice hockey, soccer, football, field hockey, baseball, softball, field lacrosse and box lacrosse. Over 160 young people play ringette in Delta. The Delta Ringette Association has 13 teams in 2005. Notable professional sports players from Delta are Jeff Francis (MLB), James Paxton (MLB), Justin Morneau (MLB), Brent Seabrook (NHL), Troy Brouwer (NHL) and Mitch Berger (NFL).

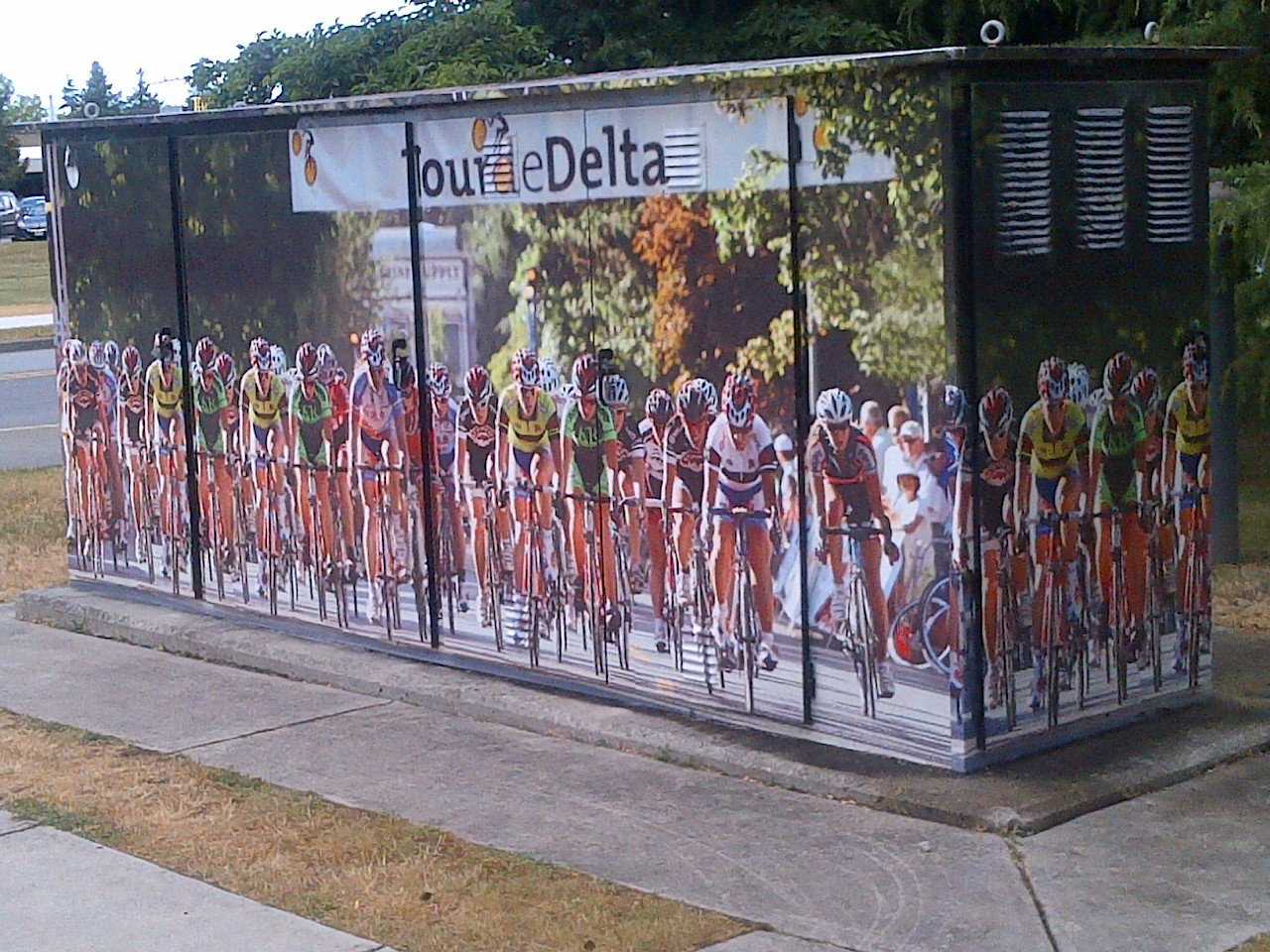
Tour de Delta wall cover on electrical box outside of Delta, British Columbia municipal hall

Delta formerly hosted their annual Tour de Delta (one-day races, for men from 2001 to 2019, and for women from 2011 to 2019). This was at its peak the largest cycling event in Canada until its end in 2019.

The Delta Triathlon is also a very popular event, selling out each year in April. The event takes place in Ladner from the Ladner Leisure Centre. Over 500 participants take part, including many from the local South Delta Triathlon Club.

Club	Sport	League	Venue
Delta Ice Hawks	Ice hockey	PIJHL	Ladner Leisure Centre
Delta Islanders	Box Lacrosse	BCJALL	Ladner Leisure Centre
Ladner Pioneers	Box Lacrosse	WCSLA	Ladner Leisure Centre

== Notable people ==
- Vince Abbott, former professional American football player; kicker for the San Diego Chargers (1987–1988)
- Dylan Ainsworth, CFL player
- Mitch Berger, former professional American football player; punter for eight National Football League teams
- Adam Braidwood, professional Canadian football player; defensive end for the Edmonton Eskimos
- Troy Brouwer, former professional hockey player
- Tyler Connolly, Musician, Singer, Songwriter, Guitarist; vocalist and guitarist for the rock band, Theory of a Deadman
- John Cummins, Canadian politician; Formerly the Conservative Member of Parliament for the riding of Delta—Richmond East, Former leader of the BC Conservative Party
- Martin Cummins, Canadian actor
- Kevin Eiben, professional Canadian football player; linebacker for the Toronto Argonauts
- Jeff Francis, professional baseball player; starting pitcher for the Colorado Rockies
- Michael Lee, Canadian field hockey player
- Beck Malenstyn, professional hockey player, left winger for the Washington Capitals
- Brandon McMillan, professional hockey player; forward for HC Neftekhimik Nizhnekamsk
- Tyson Mulock, professional hockey player; centre who has played in the Deutsche Eishockey Liga
- Gary Nylund, former professional hockey player; defenceman for the Toronto Maple Leafs, Chicago Blackhawks, and New York Islanders
- Kyle O'Reilly, professional wrestler
- Jason Priestley, Canadian actor and director
- Dave Randorf, Canadian sportscaster, currently works for Rogers Sportsnet
- Byron Ritchie, former professional hockey player
- Mark Rogers, former professional soccer player, Men's National Team Assistant Coach
- Davis Sanchez, professional Canadian football player; cornerback for the BC Lions
- Will Sasso, Canadian comedian and actor
- Brent Seabrook, professional hockey player; defenceman for the Chicago Blackhawks
- Rob Short, Canadian field hockey player
- Marie Warder, writer and founder of the Canadian Hemochromatosis Society
- Brendan Gallagher, professional hockey player; forward for the Montreal Canadiens
- Nehemiah George Massey, former MLA for Delta serving from 1956 to 1960. George Massey Tunnel is named for him.
- Nic Petan, professional hockey player; forward for the Toronto Maple Leafs
- John Oliver, 19th premier of British Columbia and former MLA for Delta

== Appearances in film and media ==
The town is used as the principal filming location for the TV series Resident Alien. The Heritage Hangar at the Boundary Bay Airport in Delta has been used as a film location in many TV series and movies.

== Sister city ==
- Mangaluru, India (Since 2010)
