= Ladner, British Columbia =

Neighbourhood in Canada

Ladner
- Neighbourhood
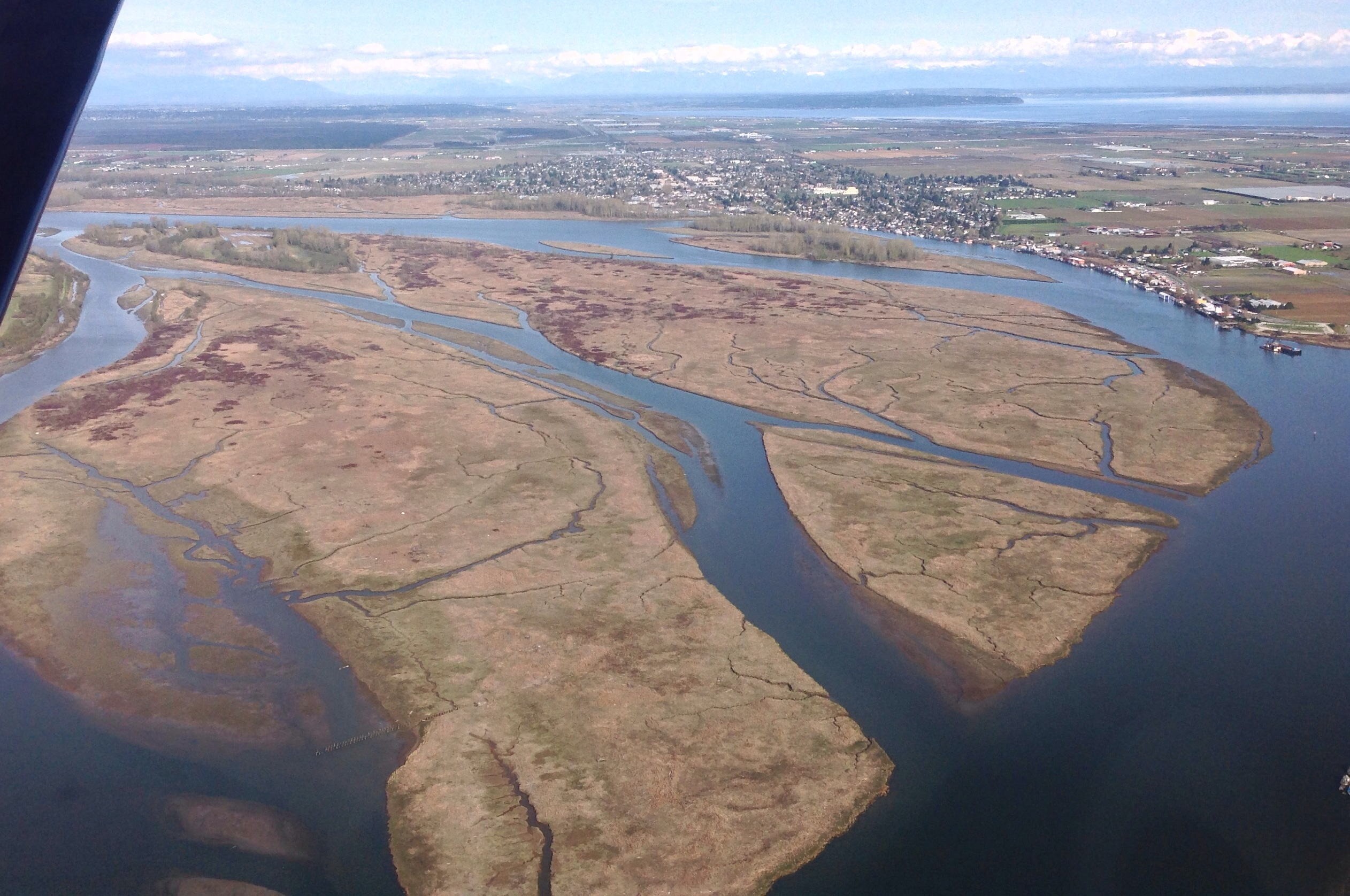
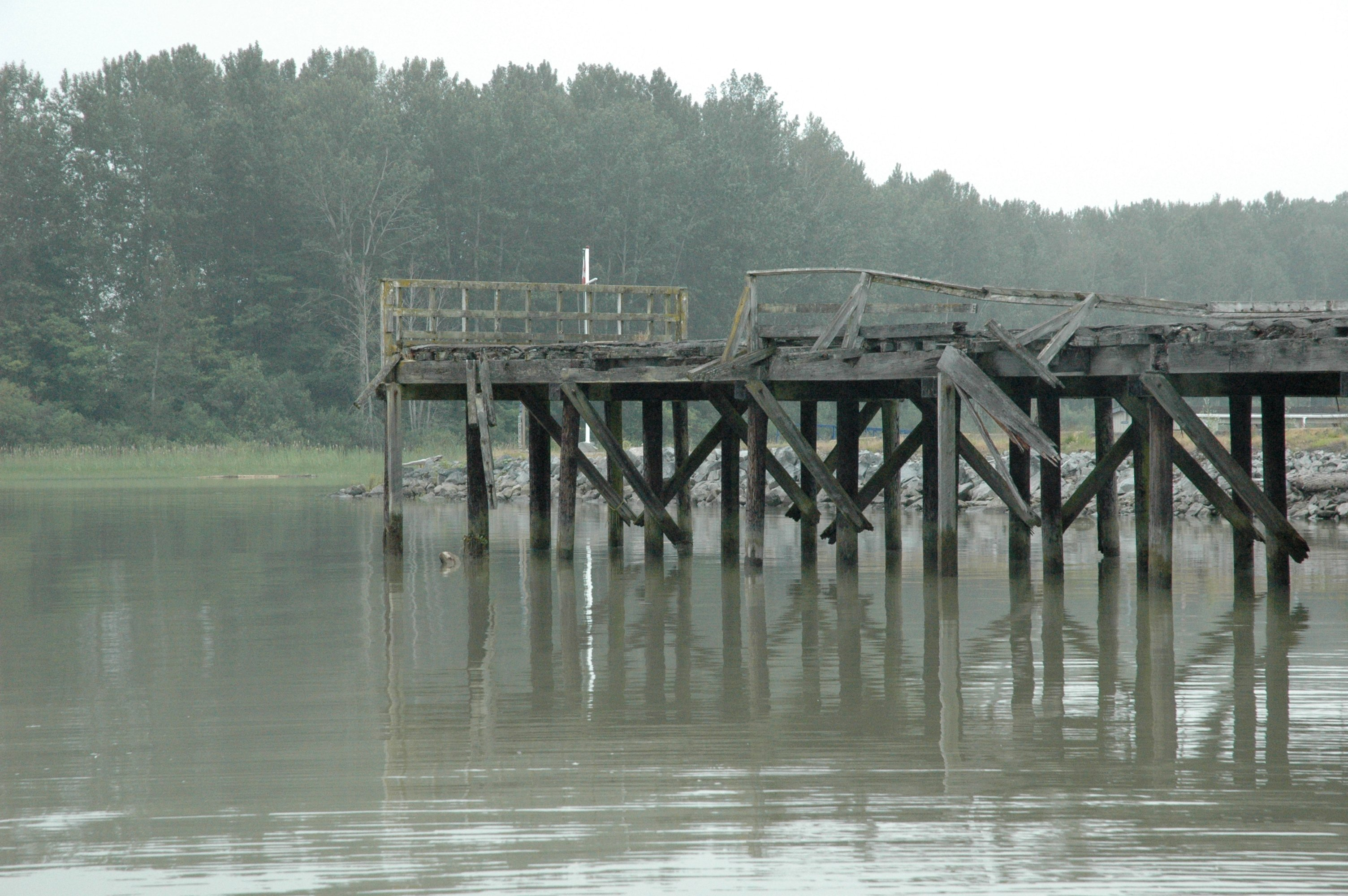
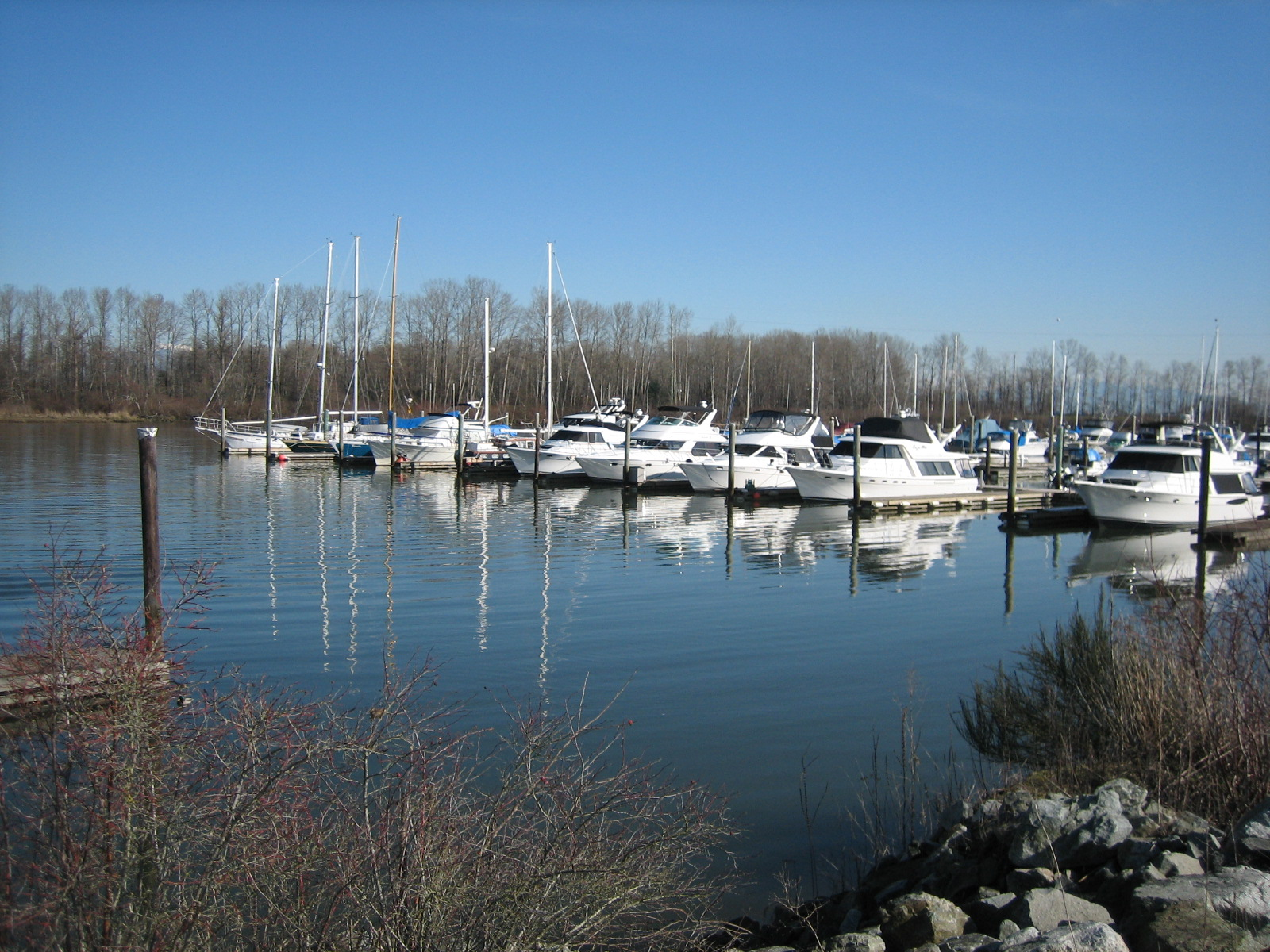
- Interactive map of Ladner
- Coordinates: 49°05′25″N 123°04′48″W
- Country: Canada
- Province: British Columbia
- Regional district: Metro Vancouver
- City: Delta

Area
  - Land: 7.37 km^{2} (2.85 sq mi)

Population (2016)
  - Total: 22,193
  - Density: 3,009.4/km^{2} (7,794/sq mi)
- Website: www.delta.ca

Ladner is a neighbourhood in Delta, which is a suburb of Vancouver, British Columbia, Canada. It was created as a fishing village on the banks of the Fraser River.

Named for Thomas and William Ladner, who came to the area in 1868 and began large farming and fishing operations, it developed as a centre for these operations. A series of ferries, culminating in the Ladner Ferry, allowed for access across the river to Richmond. The George Massey Tunnel provided a permanent connection in 1959.

== History ==
Like many areas around the Fraser River on what is now Greater Vancouver the area on the south side of the south arm of the Fraser was named for the original Europeans to settle there. First called Ladner's Landing, the area was settled by Thomas Ellis Ladner (1837–1922) and William Henry Ladner (1826–1907). They had travelled from their home in Cornwall, UK (via Wisconsin) to pursue the gold rush in California and later on the Fraser River. Settling on the area of the Fraser River Delta either side of the Chilukthan Slough in 1868, both turned to farming and fishing.

== Geography ==
=== Location and features ===
Ladner is bound to the west by the Strait of Georgia, the south by Tsawwassen, to the east by North Delta, and north by the Fraser River. Ladner is bisected by Highway 17A, which runs north–south from Highway 99 to the BC Ferries terminal. The term East Ladner is often applied to the portion of the community east of Highway 17A. The major east–west artery is called Ladner Trunk Road - which, if traveled far enough east, turns into Highway 10. West of Arthur Drive, a north–south road that connects it with Tsawwassen, it is simply called 47A Avenue.

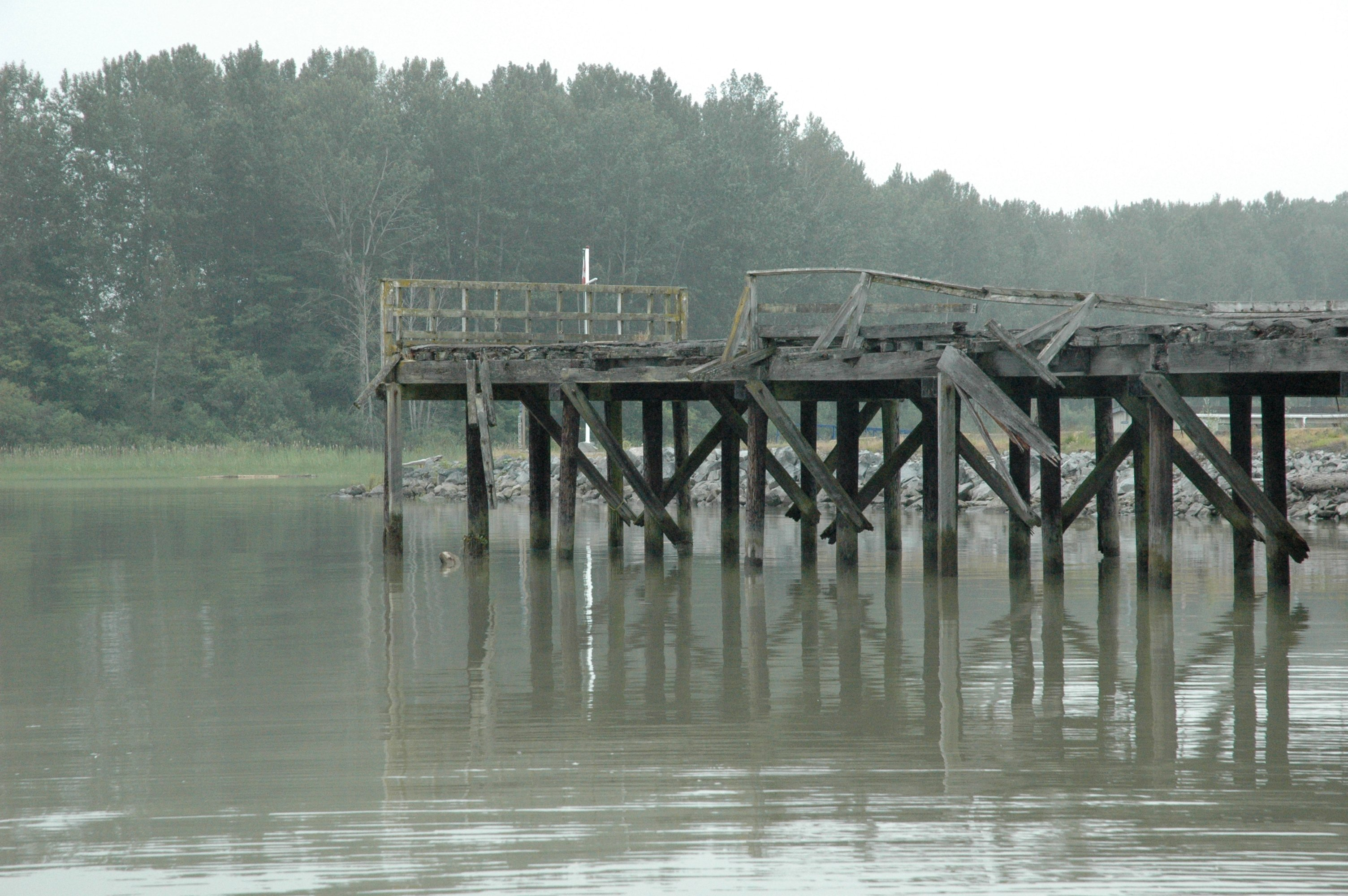
Ladner ferry dock, at the end of Ferry Road, in Captain's Cove

River Road runs east from the north end of Highway 17A along the Fraser River into North Delta and Surrey. The area between Highway 17A and North Delta is referred to as Tilbury and is one of the major industrial centres of the Lower Mainland, with many large warehouses, industrial parks and factories.

Lying to the south of the delta of the Fraser River, there are numerous islands just off the mainland that are part of Ladner. Most are small and only reachable by boat, with exceptions like Westham Island, which hosts a large bird sanctuary and is dedicated to protecting and preserving the numerous bird species found in the area, especially bald eagles and various owl species. Westham Island is a fairly large island and a popular destination for its numerous organic farms, especially its berry farms.

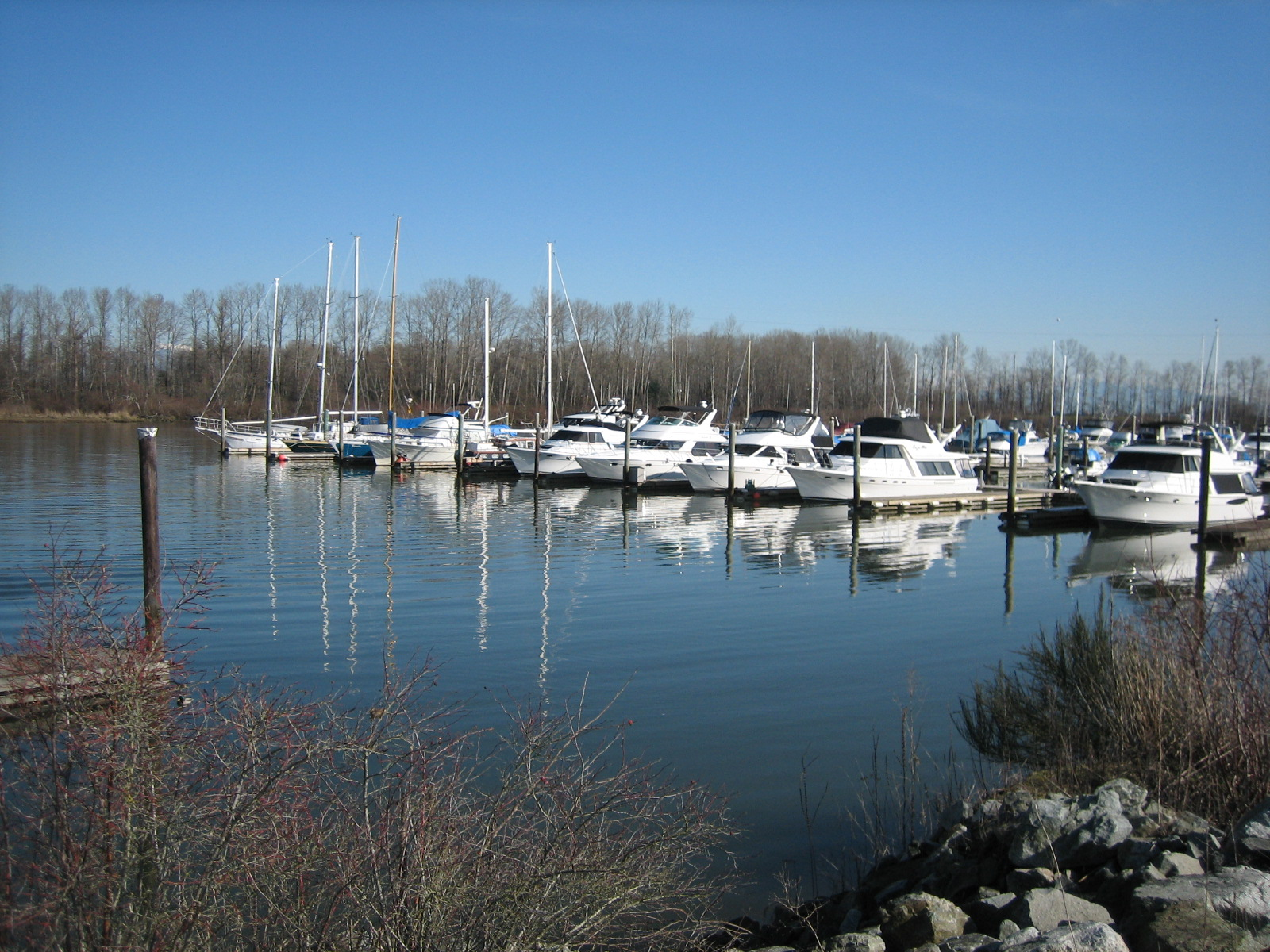
Captain's Cove Marina in north Ladner

A major feature of Ladner is the portion called Ladner Village, which is in the section of the town north of Ladner Trunk Road and west of Arthur Drive. This is a heritage community with wide, boulevarded sidewalks, open-air cafes and local shops. There are some heritage residences in this area, mostly built in the 1930s, but apartment complexes replaced many of them some decades back. The Delta Museum and Archives are in the centre of Ladner Village, along with a town clock that is amongst the oldest in the Lower Mainland.

On Ladner Trunk Road, east of Arthur Drive, two malls with supermarkets, major restaurants and other modern shops and services are found. The town is experiencing a boom of condominium development in this area, and the population is growing accordingly. Numerous parks are found throughout the community, especially along the canals which used to be used for transport through the area. No longer passable for boats, today they are still clean and fresh enough to allow fishing along their banks.

Ladner is home to two public swimming pools, one of which is an older outdoor facility located near the public library and community centre. A much larger pool is located on Harvest Drive next to the Municipal Hall in the Ladner Leisure Centre. This indoor pool features a large 25m main pool, a smaller leisure pool, a swirl pool, sauna and rock climbing wall. Also located in this facility is a skating rink and a gymnasium partially funded by Vancouver's junior hockey team, the Vancouver Giants.

Ladner is the location of the Delta Municipal Hall, police station, and the Delta Hospital. Public education is administered by School District 37 Delta. Schools include Delta Secondary School and K-7 elementary schools including Hawthorne, Holly, Ladner, Port Guichon and Neilson Grove Elementary School. Independent K-7 schools Sacred Heart and Delta Christian also serve local students.

During March 2006, Ladner made national headlines when an out-of-control house party resulted in the hospitalization of a 13-year-old boy with injuries to his head, and nearly CA$70,000 in damage.

=== Climate ===
Climate data for Ladner (Delta Ladner South) Climate ID: 1102417; coordinates 49°04′00″N 123°05′00″W; elevation: 2.0 m (6 ft 7 in); 1971-2000 normals
Month	Jan	Feb	Mar	Apr	May	Jun	Jul	Aug	Sep	Oct	Nov	Dec	Year
Record high °C (°F)	15.0 (59.0)	18.0 (64.4)	17.0 (62.6)	27.0 (80.6)	33.0 (91.4)	30.0 (86.0)	32.5 (90.5)	32.2 (90.0)	30.5 (86.9)	24.5 (76.1)	18.0 (64.4)	15.0 (59.0)	33.0 (91.4)
Mean daily maximum °C (°F)	5.8 (42.4)	7.9 (46.2)	10.5 (50.9)	13.5 (56.3)	17.2 (63.0)	19.9 (67.8)	22.5 (72.5)	22.4 (72.3)	19.0 (66.2)	13.8 (56.8)	8.7 (47.7)	6.0 (42.8)	13.9 (57.0)
Daily mean °C (°F)	2.8 (37.0)	4.5 (40.1)	6.6 (43.9)	8.9 (48.0)	12.2 (54.0)	14.9 (58.8)	16.9 (62.4)	16.9 (62.4)	13.8 (56.8)	9.5 (49.1)	5.4 (41.7)	3.1 (37.6)	9.6 (49.3)
Mean daily minimum °C (°F)	−0.3 (31.5)	1.0 (33.8)	2.6 (36.7)	4.2 (39.6)	7.2 (45.0)	9.9 (49.8)	11.4 (52.5)	11.4 (52.5)	8.6 (47.5)	5.0 (41.0)	2.0 (35.6)	0.2 (32.4)	5.3 (41.5)
Record low °C (°F)	−15.0 (5.0)	−13.0 (8.6)	−7.2 (19.0)	−3.0 (26.6)	1.1 (34.0)	0.6 (33.1)	5.0 (41.0)	2.8 (37.0)	−2.0 (28.4)	−8.0 (17.6)	−15.0 (5.0)	−16.1 (3.0)	−16.1 (3.0)
Average precipitation mm (inches)	114.9 (4.52)	110.4 (4.35)	92.8 (3.65)	69.5 (2.74)	56.8 (2.24)	45.4 (1.79)	34.4 (1.35)	32.7 (1.29)	57.0 (2.24)	93.3 (3.67)	157.3 (6.19)	143.5 (5.65)	1,008.1 (39.69)
Average rainfall mm (inches)	104.3 (4.11)	102.4 (4.03)	92.2 (3.63)	69.5 (2.74)	56.8 (2.24)	45.4 (1.79)	34.4 (1.35)	32.7 (1.29)	57.0 (2.24)	93.2 (3.67)	154.6 (6.09)	134.0 (5.28)	976.5 (38.44)
Average snowfall cm (inches)	10.6 (4.2)	7.9 (3.1)	0.7 (0.3)	0.0 (0.0)	0.0 (0.0)	0.0 (0.0)	0.0 (0.0)	0.0 (0.0)	0.0 (0.0)	0.1 (0.0)	2.7 (1.1)	9.5 (3.7)	31.6 (12.4)
Average precipitation days (≥ 0.2 mm)	17.0	16.3	15.3	13.4	12.1	10.0	7.1	6.8	9.3	13.7	18.1	18.1	157.0
Average rainy days (≥ 0.2 mm)	15.5	15.5	15.2	13.4	12.1	10.0	7.1	6.8	9.3	13.6	17.7	16.5	152.5
Average snowy days (≥ 0.2 cm)	2.7	1.8	0.50	0.0	0.0	0.0	0.0	0.0	0.0	0.06	0.72	2.5	8.3
Source: Environment and Climate Change Canada

== Holidays and attractions ==
Each spring Ladner hosts the Ladner Pioneer May Days (commonly referred to by residents simply as May Days), the longest-running festival in Delta, which was first celebrated in 1896. It is held on the weekend following the holiday commemorating Queen Victoria's birthday. It includes a parade, a carnival, and many other local events.

Every other Sunday during the summer months the major streets in the village are reserved for Ladner Village Market, a farmer's market featuring live music, food, entertainment, fresh local produce and homemade arts and crafts. Vendors from as far away as Kelowna and Vancouver Island, along with many local farmers and artisans, set up stalls selling hand-crafted and locally grown products. This market has become a major draw to the community, attracting thousands of out-of-town visitors each market day.

In September 2008 Ladner and Delta hosted Delta Rivermania, a celebration of the 200th anniversary of Simon Fraser's journey down the Fraser River. It was a weekend long event that lasted from September 26–28, 2008. It included theatrical performances, a pancake breakfast, clam chowder cookoff, midnight market and street entertainment. It was the final weekend of BC Rivermania celebrations, part of the BC 150.

== Telecommunications ==
Delta is serviced by Telus and Eastlink, which acquired Delta Cable, for television, Internet, and telephone services, one of the very few areas in Canada not serviced by Rogers Cable nor Shaw Cable.

Telephone services are run primarily by Telus. Within area code 604, the central office code servicing Ladner for years was 946 but, as the population expanded, new exchanges — 940 in the early 1990s and 952 recently — were added.

== Ladner in film ==
The Ladner Village area is popular with film crews for its "Main Street USA" feel, quaint coastal fishing settings, and heritage church buildings. The general South Delta area also provides open landscapes of farmland, ocean beaches, forest and wetlands, all within a few kilometres of each other. These features make the area a popular location for movie productions such as the Air Bud series, Final Destination, Along Came a Spider, 3000 Miles to Graceland, Josie and the Pussycats, Deck the Halls, X-Men: The Last Stand, Shooter, Home Is Where The Hart Is, A Fairly Odd Movie: Grow Up, Timmy Turner!, 50/50, and Fifty Shades of Grey, as well as various television productions such as Smallville, The X-Files, Stargate SG-1, Supernatural, The Sandlot trilogy, Three Moons Over Milford, Impastor, The Secret Circle, Bates Motel, and Charlie Sheen did Scary Movie 3. It has recently been the main filming location for A Dog's Way Home, as well as a location for The Stand.

== Notable residents ==
- Ivan Decker, stand-up comedian and radio personality heard on hit CBC radio program The Debaters and Netflix Comedians of the World Series
- Jacob Holt, basketball player
- Darcy Michael, comedian, actor
- Enuka Okuma, actress, appeared in Sue Thomas: F.B.Eye and Madison
- Doreen Patterson Reitsma, Wren in the Royal Canadian Navy
- James Paxton, Major League Baseball pitcher for the Boston Red Sox
- Will Sasso, an Italian Canadian comedic actor most famous for his casting on the hit sketch comedy series Mad TV
- Linus Sebastian, YouTube personality and host of Linus Tech Tips
- Manoj Sood, actor, most famous for the role of Baber Siddiqui in Little Mosque on the Prairie
- Bill Vander Zalm, 28th Premier of British Columbia
- Marie Warder, writer and founder of the Canadian Hemochromatosis Society
