= Ladner Leisure Centre =

Recreation centre in Delta, BC, Canada

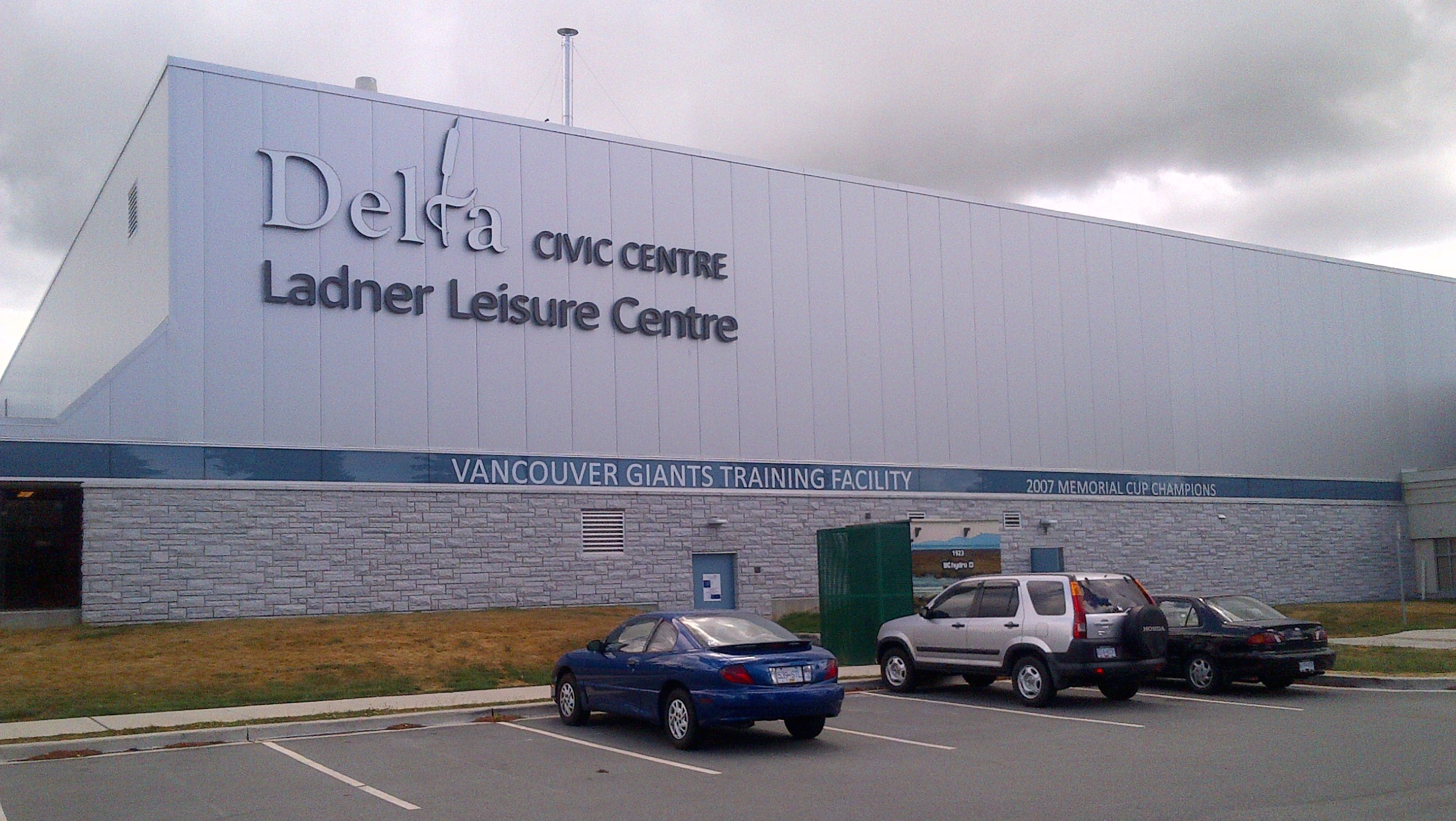
- Interactive map of Ladner Leisure Centre
- Location: 4600 Clarence Taylor Crescent; Delta, British Columbia; V4K 3X3
- Coordinates: 49.08659°N 123.05829°W
- Owner: Corporation of Delta
- Capacity: Hockey and lacrosse: 1,015

Construction
- Groundbreaking: 1991
- Opened: 1992

The Ladner Leisure Centre is a recreation centre in Ladner, a community in Delta, British Columbia. The facility contains an ice rink and two swimming pools, a six-lane 25-metre competition pool and a wading pool for casual use. It also houses a 2,800 square foot weight room, a fitness studio, multi-purpose rooms, a swirl pool, a sauna, as well as a Blenz coffee shop and a private physiotherapy clinic.

The facility is the official training centre of the WHL's Vancouver Giants and a home rink, along with Tilbury Arena and South Delta Recreation Centre, for the South Delta Minor Hockey Association.

It is the former home of the Delta Ice Hawks, before they moved to Sungod Recreation Centre in North Delta for the 2025-26 season.

During the summer months the ice is removed and surface is used for lacrosse where it is the home of the BCJLL's Delta Islanders, the WCSLA's Ladner Pioneers, as well as the Delta Lacrosse Association.
