= Ladner Ferry =

Coordinates: 49°07′03″N 123°05′12″W

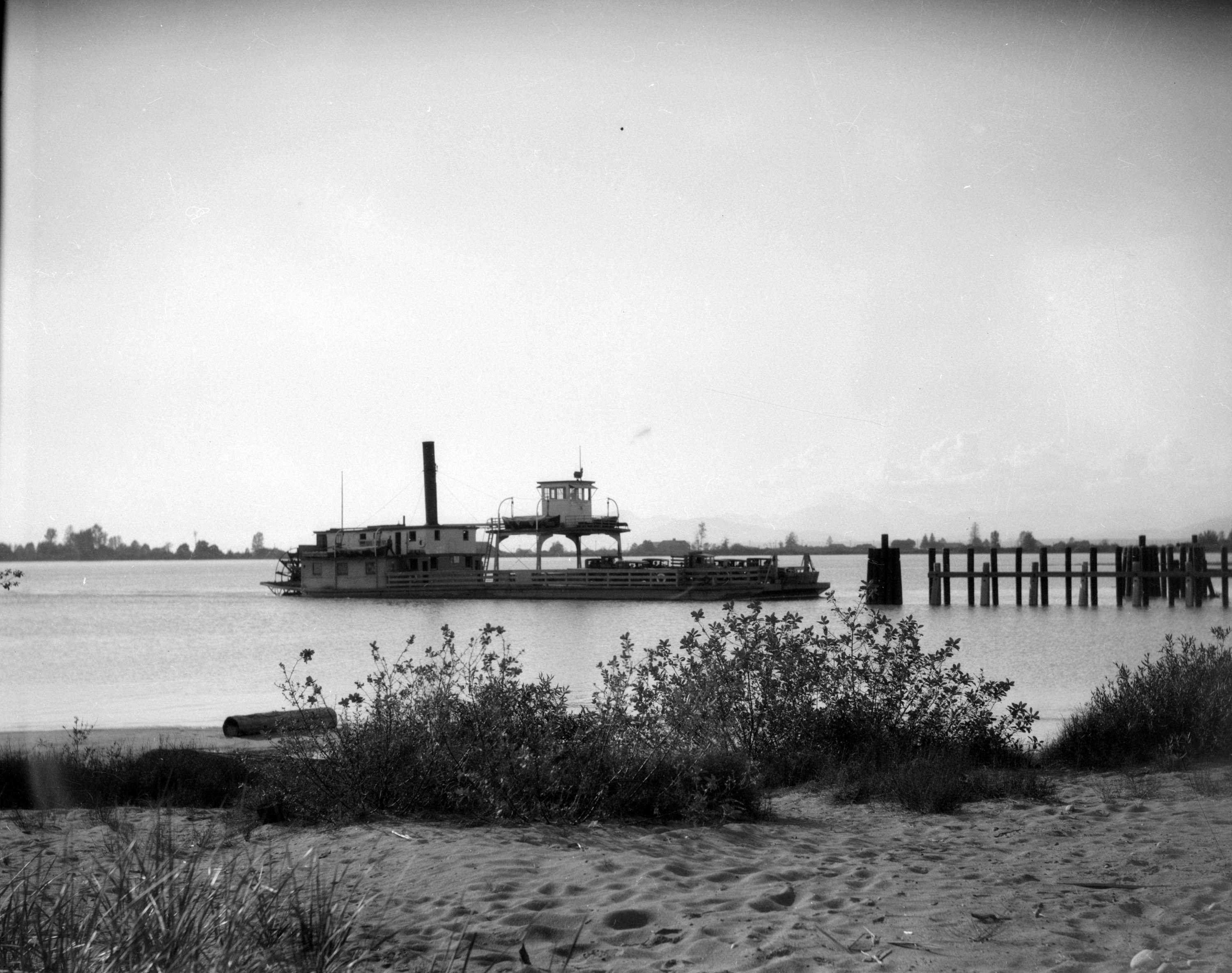
- Locale: Metro Vancouver, British Columbia
- Waterway: Fraser River
- Transit type: Passenger and vehicle ferry
- Operator: Department of Public Works
- Began operation: 1913
- Ended operation: 23 May, 1959
- No. of lines: 1
- No. of vessels: 1
- No. of terminals: 2

The Ladner Ferry was a crossing of the south arm of the Fraser River in Metro Vancouver, linking Ladner with Richmond. It operated from 1913 until 1959, when it was replaced by the George Massey Tunnel.

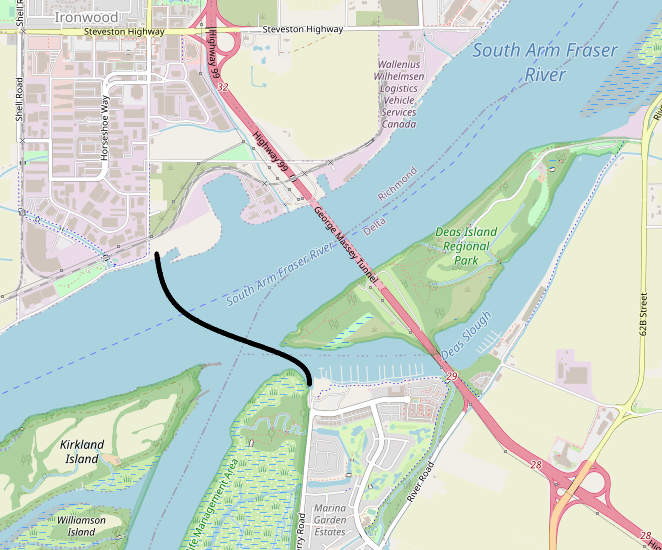
Route of the Ladner Ferry shown on a modern map

== History ==
In the early 1890s, the Union Steamship S.S Eliza Edwards provided a daily Vancouver-Steveston-Ladner's Landing run. The Vancouver and Lulu Island Railway proposal included a connecting ferry to Ladner that never eventuated. During 1898–1900, the three times weekly CP Navigation Victoria-New Westminster schedule included Lulu Island and Ladner. The 45-passenger Sonoma ran twice daily Ladner-Steveston during 1905–1909. The replacement vessel from the 1910 summer, the New Delta, ran the route three times daily in the spring/summer, and twice daily in the fall/winter, until April 1914. However, dangerous ice floes sometimes temporarily cancelled services.

Maintaining the Steveston run, the New Delta conducted a three-times-daily trial during April and May 1912 between Ladner and Woodward's Landing (south end of No. 5 Road, Richmond). In January 1913, the Scanlon (Helen M. Scanlon), pulling a barge, made the crossing in 20 minutes, while conducting a trial run for a government ferry service. During 1913, piles were driven for the new temporary Ladner dock, and the province and municipalities upgraded or built the approach and connecting roads on both sides.

Strategic to their proposed Lulu Island branch line, the Canadian Northern Railway (CNoR), specified a Steveston terminal for their planned Vancouver Island ferry service. Revised to Woodward's Landing, CNoR acquired 250 acres for five miles of siding and a three-track slip capable of handling the largest ferries (150 feet). The CNoR dock never eventuated after the demise of the railway.

In November 1913, the Scanlon, with its barge in tow, established the Ladner-Woodward's Landing government ferry service. The boat carried the passengers and the barge transported vehicles and livestock. A bus along No. 5 Road from Vancouver connected with the four daily sailings. That December, when the ferry struck a sand bar in heavy fog, damaging the paddlewheel, the trip across took four hours and the bus ran out of fuel, stranding the passengers at Woodward's Landing. Owing to the deplorable winter road conditions, the bus could take an hour to cover the 8 kilometres (5 mi) across Richmond. In April 1914, the Sonoma returned to the Ladner-Steveston route, but it is unclear when this service ceased.

Purchasing the privately owned Scanlon (later renamed the William Henry Ladner), the government began a two-month refit of the vessel. Meanwhile, the smaller tug Linda took its place. The remodelled ferry no longer needed to tow a barge, and the faster turnaround increased service to six times daily. However, the bus connection covered only four sailings, until increasing to six, two months later. At this time, oiling the gravel sections, and planking the remainder of No. 5 Road, allowed a faster more comfortable bus ride. Purchased in March 1918 for $10,000, the larger Beaver underwent a $40,000 complete overhaul, before replacing the former ferry in July 1919. The vessel unsuited to heavy traffic, because it loaded from the sides, increasing the risk of damage to vehicles, was replaced in 1926–27. Winter ice floes and spring flooding, which made navigation hazardous, prompted proposals for a permanent Deas Island crossing.

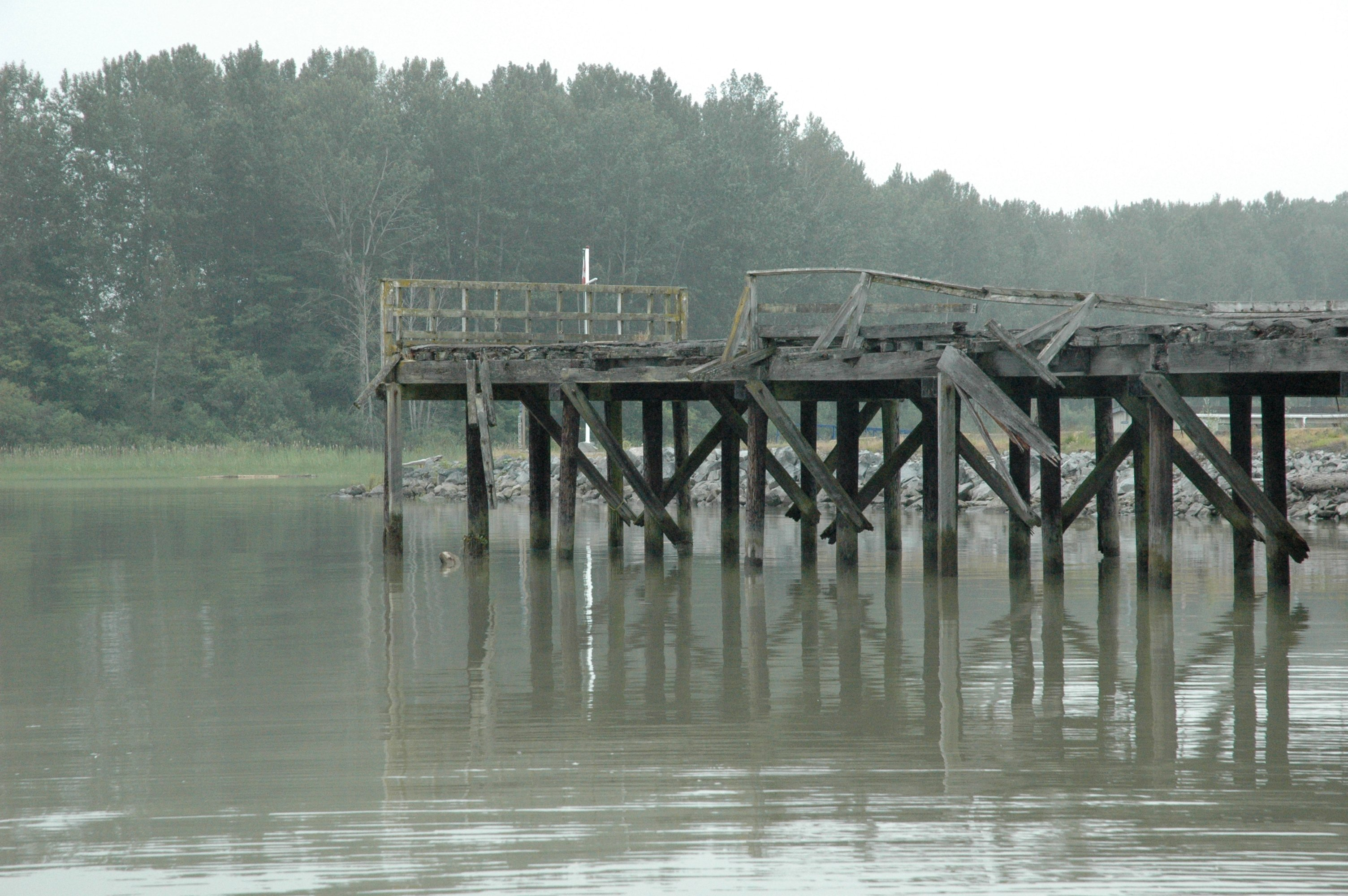
Derelict former ferry dock, Ladner, 2005

The Ladner terminal moved twice. During 1920–21, construction costed $15,748. The landing and paved Ferry Road cost $80,000, but on opening in 1931 the crossing time reduced to 10 minutes. When tendered in 1932, three bids required no subsidy to operate the ferry, while Mr. Robson, the private operator for the prior six years, offered to pay $1,800 per annum. The province was responsible for supplying an appropriate vessel. The Ladner-Woodwards No. 3. failed its federal inspection. The MS Agassiz, the replacement in November 1932, had only half the carrying capacity. The province reimbursed losses being sustained by operator Leonard M. Robson, due to these serious deficiencies.

The bitumen surfacing of No. 5 Rd during 1935–36 provided continuous pavement from the ferry to Vancouver. In 1936, additional summer sailings were introduced. The landing and approach at Woodward's Landing received extensive maintenance in 1940-41. The Ladner landing, on a side channel, experienced ongoing silting that required periodical dredging, and at times grounded the ferry in mid-summer. To address this issue, the landing was extended into the main channel during 1947-48.

Permanent replacement, the Delta Princess with a speed of 12 knots, entered service in 1949. The new steel hull double-ended twin-screw ferry had a capacity for 35 cars and 200 passengers.

A new landing at Woodward's Landing was built throughout 1952–53. In November 1952, the charter contract ceased and the province assumed operations. A 24-hour service was instituted from 1954. Scouring at the Ladner landing caused a collapse on the extension, and its relocation. At peak times, the ferry could make five round trips in two hours. On the George Massey Tunnel opening, the Delta Princess made the final run on May 23, 1959. Acquired by the Gulf Island Ferry Co., it was later renamed MV Salt Spring Queen by BC Ferries.

== Patronage ==
Patronage (1922–1947)^{a} (Double these numbers for single trips)
Type	Year	Page	Round Trips	Motor Vehicles	Horse- drawn rigs	Passengers	Freight (tons)	Livestock	Total Vehicles
Sternwheeler steamer	1922–23	C40	1,895	24,037	570	59,599	4,760	1,341	24,607
Sternwheeler steamer	1923–24	L38	2,150	27,150	368	65,427	4,685	1,252	27,518
Sternwheeler steamer	1924–25	Q38	2,096	29,259	334	64,643	12,030	1,604	29,593
Sternwheeler steamer	1925–26	Q38	2,261	29,205	272	62,918	11,061	1,311	29,477
Sternwheeler steamer	1926–27	P46	2,272	25,830	53	53,105	5,177	730	25,883
Sternwheeler steamer	1927–28	U52	2,912	37,968	109	79,142		976	38,077
Sternwheeler steamer	1928–29	S60	1,019	34,651	6	74,151		908	34,657
Sternwheeler steamer	1929–30	T74	no	data					
Sternwheeler steamer	1930–31	G50	3,060	39,615	27	79,092	2	196	39,642
Sternwheeler steamer	1931–32	M40	5,923	52,338	55	90,338		296	52,393
Power ferry	1932–33	Q37	5,882	48,262	66	70,332		226	48,328
Power ferry	1933–34	O33	6,298	47,095	47	72,222		271	47,142
Power ferry	1934–35	T37	6,582	52,100	55	80,046		370	52,155
Power ferry	1935–36	I44	6,264	53,642	49	77,259		260	53,691
Power ferry	1936–37	X52	6,735	56,794	27	84,326		87	56,821
Power ferry	1937–38	X55	7,373	61,723	23	88,259	21	607	61,746
Power ferry	1938–39	Z56	6,981	63,105	4	87,458		1,020	63,109
Power ferry	1939–40	P56	6,611	63,644	1	92,294		1,016	63,645
Power ferry	1940–41	O47	8,732	70,325		102,773		1,518	70,325
Power ferry	1941–42	T52	9,207	87,173		124,941	66	1,478	87,173
Power ferry	1942–43	O52	8,766	91,551		146,585		1,637	91,551
Power ferry	1943–44	Q52	10,037	78,406	1	132,323		1,503	78,407
Power ferry	1944–45	O51	9,745	85,354	2	145,388	11	1,298	85,356
Power ferry	1945–46	Q58	10,728	110,198		148,090		1,252	110,198
Power ferry	1946–47	P47	10,911	127,059		152,392	135	894	127,059

^a . Extracted from the respective Ministry of Public Works annual reports.

Patronage (1947–1960)^{b} (Double these numbers for single trips)
Type	Year	Page	Round Trips	Passenger Autos	Passengers (Drivers excluded)	Trucks	Trailers & Semis	Buses	Motor- cycles	Horse- drawn rigs	Freight (tons)	Livestock	Misc. Veh.	Total Vehicles
Power ferry	1947–48	N56	11,414	146,120	199,762	26,920	990	3,522	2,108	3,610	1,318	1,043		183,270
Power ferry	1948–49	O60	12,131	163,407	197,563	26,437	982	3,055	2,188		227	689		196,069
Power ferry	1949–50	Q74	11,835	206,869	243,675	29,059	968	2,519	1,631			303		241,046
Power ferry	1950–51	N77	11,474	280,460	292,100	32,155	961	2,311	980			58		316,867
Power ferry	1951–52	P83	11,870	259,924	300,497	29,791	958	2,361	809			2		293,843
Power ferry	1952–53	O85	10,903	264,425	288,448	26,989	1,014	2,011	523	1		3		294,963
Power ferry	1953–54	M93	13,198	312,048	335,539	25,918	1,661	2,652	669	7		1		342,955
Power ferry	1954–55	K95	14,601	335,312	353,541	25,011	1,620	2,648	613			1		365,204
Power ferry	1955–56	N88	14,721	349,414	350,757	23,557	1,484	2,666	881					378,002
Power ferry	1956–57	J100	14,764	386,456	389,901	29,512	1,765	2,736	867					421,336
Power ferry	1957–58	G53	15,423	440,530	437,938	38,550	2,339	2,742	591					484,752
Power ferry	1958–59	G36	15,475	492,623	459,071	39,525	3,887	2,904	935					539,874
Power ferry	1959–60	F41	2,279	74,017	63,184	6,043	964	428	140					81,592

^b . Extracted from the respective Ministry of Public Works or Ministry of Highways annual reports. Although some figures appear suspect, the overall trend is clear.

== See also ==
- List of crossings of the Fraser River
