= British Columbia Toll Highways and Bridge Authority =

Canadian provincial government organization

British Columbia Toll Highways and Bridges Authority was a government organization in the Province of British Columbia; this provincial governmental organization has long since been dissolved. Six of the longest Bridges were built for this agency and they include:

- The George Massey Tunnel (known as the Deas Island Tunnel when built); opened in 1959 and cost about $25 million
- The Oak Street Bridge; opened in 1957 and cost about $9 million
- The Agassiz-Rosedale Bridge; opened in 1956 and cost about $5 million
- The Ironworkers Memorial Second Narrows Crossing (known as the Second Narrows Bridge when built); opened in 1960
- The Nelson Bridge; opened in 1957 and cost about $4 million
- Purchased from the Guinness companies in 1955, the Lions Gate Bridge

Any and all bridges under the control of the British Columbia Toll Highways and Bridges Authority were transferred over to the British Columbia Ministry of Transportation.
