= Shakealarm =

Earthquake early warning system

ShakeAlarm is an on-site earthquake early warning system (EEWS) developed by Weir-Jones Engineering Consultants in Vancouver, British Columbia. The system functions by detecting and identifying fast moving P-waves that arrive before the slower and damaging S-waves generated from the hypocenter of an earthquake. Once ShakeAlarm has identified a candidate P-wave it will determine in less than 500 milliseconds if the following S-wave will be strong enough to be dangerous. Once the determination has been reached that an inbound S-wave might exceed acceptable levels the system can trigger the structured shutdown of critical processes - gas, electricity and water services - and can also be used for opening of fire bay doors, SMS warnings to the general population and a variety of other services to be activated before the S-wave's (shaking) impact. ShakeAlarm represents a streamlined site specific application of technology and ideas that Japan has been working with for some time on a nationwide deployment level in the form of a network.

== Applications ==
ShakeAlarm is deployed throughout British Columbia, Washington State and Oregon State - further locations on the West Coast of North America are being investigated for deployment of the ShakeAlarm system.

Shakealarm has been protecting the George Massey Tunnel, (and its 50,000+ daily users) in Delta, BC against significant seismic activity since 2009.

== Development ==
ShakeAlarm is the most current technology to come from over 30 years of microseismic research and development conducted by Weir-Jones Engineering Consultants. Major contributors to the development of ShakeAlarm include Dr. Anton Zaicenco Dr. Iain Weir-Jones, and Sharlie Huffman formerly of the BC Ministry of Transportation.

== History ==
The earliest uses of this technology by the development company were focused on listening for propagating micro fractures in the rock hundreds of meters under the surface. This was done to monitor the effects of oil and gas sector activities like fracking. The next major development from microseismic technology was the ability to look at interactions on the surface from a buried sensor, this led to a system called Rockfall which is designed to replace fall fences on sections of railway prone to falling rock and debris. ShakeAlarm was a natural evolution when it was discovered that the technology being used was capable of detecting P-wave vibrations in the ground.
