= Marie Warder =

South African journalist, novelist and activist

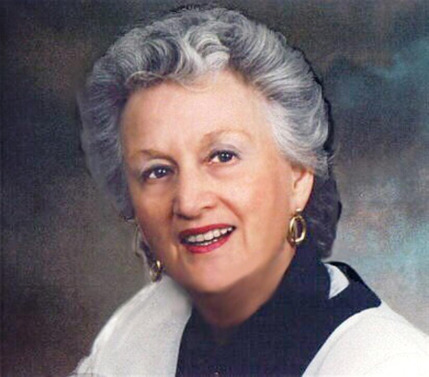
- Marie Warder
- Born: Marie Van Zyl alt Marie Van Zijl; 30 April 1927; Ficksburg, South Africa
- Died: 20 October 2014 (aged 87); Tsawwassen, British Columbia
- Occupations: Journalist and author
- Known for: Hemochromatosis activism

Marie Warder (born Marie van Zyl, 30 April 1927 – 20 October 2014) was a South African-born Canadian journalist, novelist and activist best known for her activities raising awareness about hemochromatosis. Warder founded the Hemochromatosis Society of South Africa, and the Canadian Hemochromatosis Society (CHS), and was founder and long-time president of the International Association of Hemochromatosis Societies (IAHS), writing the detailing leaflets for them all, which meant that, at that stage, every publication of the Canadian Hemochromatosis Society carried the footnote: "Produced for the International Association of Haemochromatosis Societies."

Any emerging or fledgling hemochromatosis society in other parts of the world was free to use her material, with due acknowledgement to the IAHS. Later, Guy Fernau, founder of the Haemochromatosis Society in the United Kingdom, related how, before his own material could be prepared, he only needed to scan the Canadian pamphlet and change the spelling.

== Biography ==
Warder was born Marie van Zyl in Ficksburg, South Africa in 1927. She married Tom Warder when she was 19 and he 21, upon his return from active service in World War II, and later moved with him to Canada. Tom was diagnosed with hemochromatosis in 1975, and their daughter was diagnosed with the same disorder in 1979. These two events spurred Warder to become an activist, raising awareness of this disorder within the medical community and the general public.

=== Journalism career ===
Warder's first editor was once heard to say that his young protégée must have been born with printer's ink in her veins for her journalistic "career" began at the age of nine when she won first prize in a province-wide essay competition launched by the administrator of what was then known as "the Orange Free State" in South Africa. The subject she chose was "The Natural Order of Lepidoptera" and the prize was a Queen Victoria silver penny of the kind given to deserving poor people as part of a religious ceremony held on the Thursday before Easter.

In February 1939, having already written a play, The Secret of the Kennels for the SABC children's program Young Ideas the previous year, Warder began writing stories for local newspapers, selling her first story to the Cape Argus at age 12. In 1944, she had had two stories published in the British magazine Everybody's and later wrote for several South African periodicals.

By 17, she was also the chief reporter for the Germiston Advocate. In this role, Warder was reportedly the youngest chief reporter in the world. Warder had the chance to interview, among others, Pat Boone, Field Marshal Jan Christiaan Smuts and Frances Steloff, founder of New York's Gotham Book Mart in 1920.

Warder's journalism career is most noted for her numerous pamphlets and articles on the subject of hemochromatosis.

=== Writing career ===
While still living in South Africa, Warder took to writing fiction. She is the author of twenty-four novels, written in English and Afrikaans; three of which were used for some years as required reading in South African schools. (Note: Storm Water and Samaritaan van die Sahara in Afrikaans and Penny of the Morning Star in English. The last was commissioned for use by ESL students, and thus contained an English/Afrikaans glossary as well as comprehension questions. An updated version for general reading, without the English/Afrikaans glossary and comprehension questions, was issued in time for Christmas 2010.) Many of her stories take place in and around newspaper offices.

Warder's biography is included in the Archives of the National Council of Women among "Notable Women of Johannesburg".

Late in 2003, Warder returned to novel writing. Storm Water and With no remorse… were released simultaneously less than a year later. In late 2010, Warder was working on her 23rd book: an updated version of Penny of the Morning Star, a novel she had originally written in South Africa in the 1960s as a part of a training course in English as a second language. Her latest book, April in Portugal, was released late in May 2011, and she currently writes a series of "Little Kindle Tales for Little People."

=== Hemochromatosis activism ===
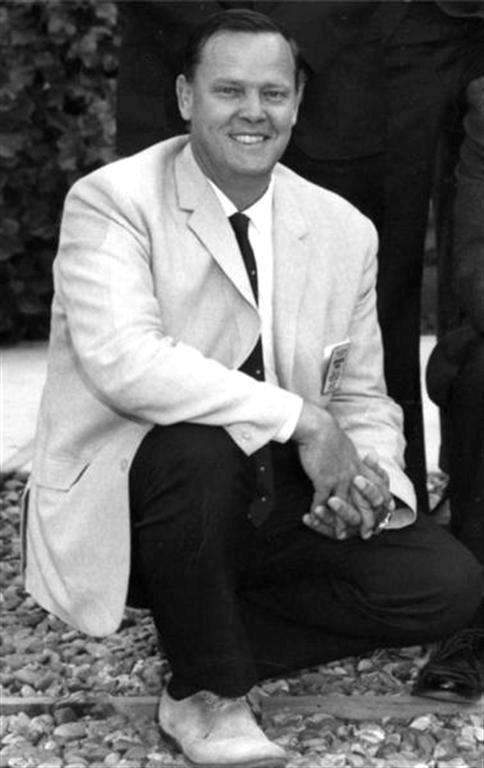
Tom Warder, Marie's husband, whose fight with hemochromatosis was the catalyst for her crusade against this disorder.

In 1975, Warder's husband, Tom, who had been seriously ill for eight years, was finally diagnosed with hemochromatosis at the age of 50, and died in 1992. In 1979 their daughter, then 32, was also diagnosed with hemochromatosis. Warder concluded that the disorder was hereditary and that much of what she had been told about it was incorrect: women could indeed develop hemochromatosis, and it was not only a disorder of middle-age. Warder made it her mission to make the world aware of this disorder, including an interview with Ida Clarkson on CHEK television. For more than 28 years after that, except for a series of travel articles, Warder devoted her literary efforts to works about hemochromatosis. During this time she wrote The Bronze Killer, the first devoted entirely to the subject of the genetic disorder hemochromatosis. The term "Bronze Killer" has been used, among others, in the Toronto Star, in British newspapers, in the magazine supplement of the Johannesburg Sunday Express and in a Quebec French issue of the Reader's Digest, where it is called "La tueuse au masque du bronze". Hemochromatosis was referred to as "the bronze killer" in an editorial by Clement Finch, Professor of Medicine Emeritus of the University of Washington, in the Western Journal of Medicine, September 1990.

Warder went on to found hemochromatosis societies in South Africa and Canada.

Warder has also published more than 300 articles on the subject of hemochromatosis, as well as patient literature for individuals, hospitals and other medical facilities. Her newsletters and brochures have gone out to more than 16 countries.

=== Other activities ===
In addition to her activities as a writer and activist, Warder has been an educator, founding and serving as the first principal of Windsor House Academy, a "dual-medium" school in Kempton Park, South Africa; and a musician, playing piano and clavioline with her husband's band. and, late in life, a lay chaplain at the Delta Hospital in Ladner, British Columbia.

== Bibliography ==
=== Fiction ===
English

- Warder, Marie (2003). Storm Water. Stories from South Africa Series. Maple Lane Publishing. ISBN 978-0-921966-05-0.
- Warder, Marie (2003). With No Remorse. Stories from South Africa Series. Dromedaris Books. ISBN 978-0-921966-03-6.
- Warder, Marie (2004). When You Know -- that You Know, that You Know!. Stories from South Africa. Vol. 3. Maple Lane Publishing. ISBN 978-0-921966-09-8.
- Warder, Marie (2004). Tarnished Idols. Stories from South Africa. Dromedaris Books. ISBN 978-0-921966-07-4.
- Warder, Marie (2006). Dominic Verwey Samaritan of the Sahara. Stories from South Africa. Vol. 5. Booksurge Llc. ISBN 978-0-9733625-0-3.
- Warder, Marie (2007). The Yardstick. Stories from South Africa Series. Booksurge Llc. ISBN 978-0-9733625-1-0.
- Warder, Marie (2010). Penny of the Morning Star: The Story of a Girl Reporter in the Nineteen Forties. Stories from South Africa. Maple Lane Publishing.
- Warder, Marie (2011). April in Portugal. Dromedaris Books. ISBN 978-0-9733625-4-1.

Afrikaans

- Warder, Marie (1953). Klei-Voete [Feet of Clay]. Die Goeie Hoop Uitgewers. ASIN B0040MIFXS.
- Warder, Marie (1954). Samaritaan van die Sahara [Samaritan of the Sahara]. Johannesburg: Dagbreek-Boekkring. OCLC 37484386.
- Warder, Marie (1959). Niemand so Blind [None So Blind]. Johannesburg: Dagbreek-Boekkring. OCLC 36230980.
- Warder, Marie (1961). Deur sonskyn en skaduwee [Through Sunshine and Shadow]. Johannesburg: Dagbreek-Boekkring. OCLC 504531563.
- Warder, Marie (1963). Die maatstok [The Dipstick]. Johannesburg: Dagbreek-Boekkring. OCLC 14643120.

=== Nonfiction ===
- Warder, Marie (1989). The Bronze Killer: The Story of a Family's Fight Against a Very Common Enemy - Hemochromatosis. Imperani Publishers Publishers. ISBN 0-88925-885-6. (Updated in 2000 as The Bronze Killer: New Edition (Dromedaris Books, ISBN 9780968735800) including "Iron: The Other Side of the Story", a layman's guide to hemochromatosis)

== Recognition ==
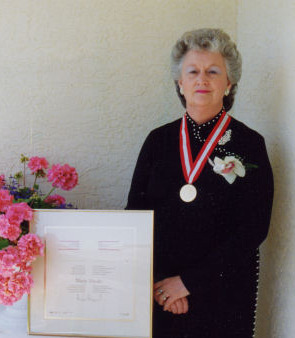
Warder with the Canada Volunteer Medal of Honour

For her efforts in founding the CHS, Warder was presented with a certificate of appreciation on 11 April 1988 by Mayor G.J. Blair, of Richmond, British Columbia "in recognition of her contribution to voluntary service" in that city, one year after he had been the first Mayor in Canada to proclaim an annual week of awareness for Hemochromatosis. During the first Awareness Week, 523 new cases of hemochromatosis were diagnosed.

In 2011, she was presented with a Lifetime Achievement Award at the International Bio-Iron Conference held in Vancouver, "honoring her lifelong involvement and dedication to the awareness of Hemochromatosis around the world." Some years ago, the Minister of Health for Canada declared May each year to be a month of National Awareness for the disorder and it is now also observed by organizations in other countries for instance the United States.

Warder was awarded the Canada Volunteer Award in 1991 by the Health and Welfare Canada for her work and advocacy of raising awareness of hemochromatosis. (Note: Text of Certificate: "Through Marie Warder’s research and most noted book, The Bronze Killer, she has educated doctors and the general public about the disorder. As a result, hemochromatosis is now recognized as Canada’s most common genetic disorder, and routine blood tests for the disorder may soon become standard diagnostic procedure.")

== Death ==
Warder died on 20 October 2014.

== Notes ==
^**Hart Sonder Liefde and Penny of the Morning Star - the story of a girl reporter
