= George Massey Tunnel =

Tunnel beneath the Fraser River in British Columbia

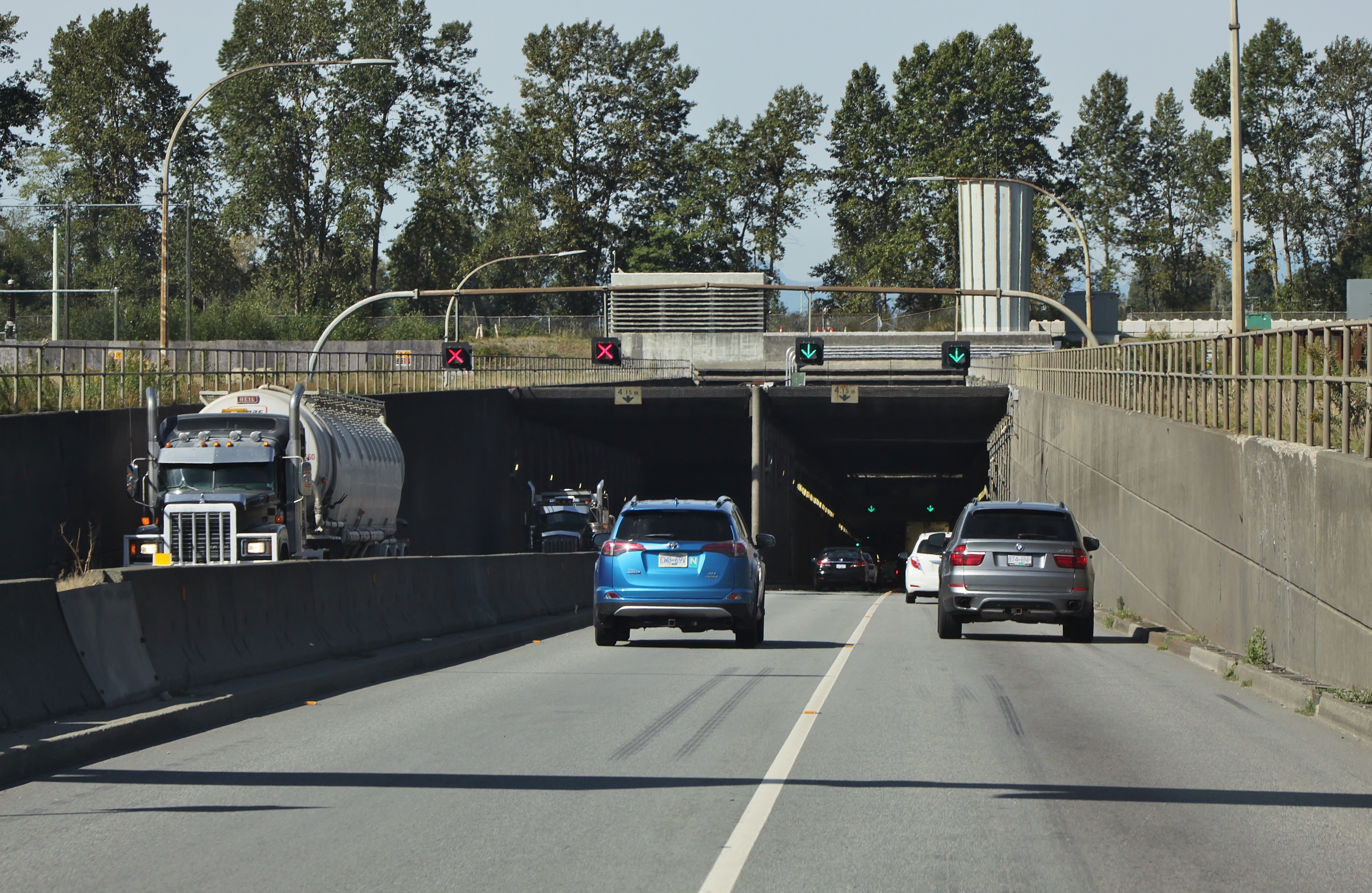
- South portal of the Massey Tunnel
- Interactive map of George Massey Tunnel

Overview
- Location: Metro Vancouver
- Coordinates: 49.121663°N 123.075628°W
- Route: British Columbia Highway 99

Operation
- Opened: May 23, 1959; 67 years ago
- Owner: British Columbia Toll Highways and Bridge Authority (original); British Columbia Ministry of Transportation
- Traffic: Automotive
- Character: Freeway

Technical
- Length: 2,064 feet (629 m)
- No. of lanes: 4
- Water Depth: 22 m (72 ft)

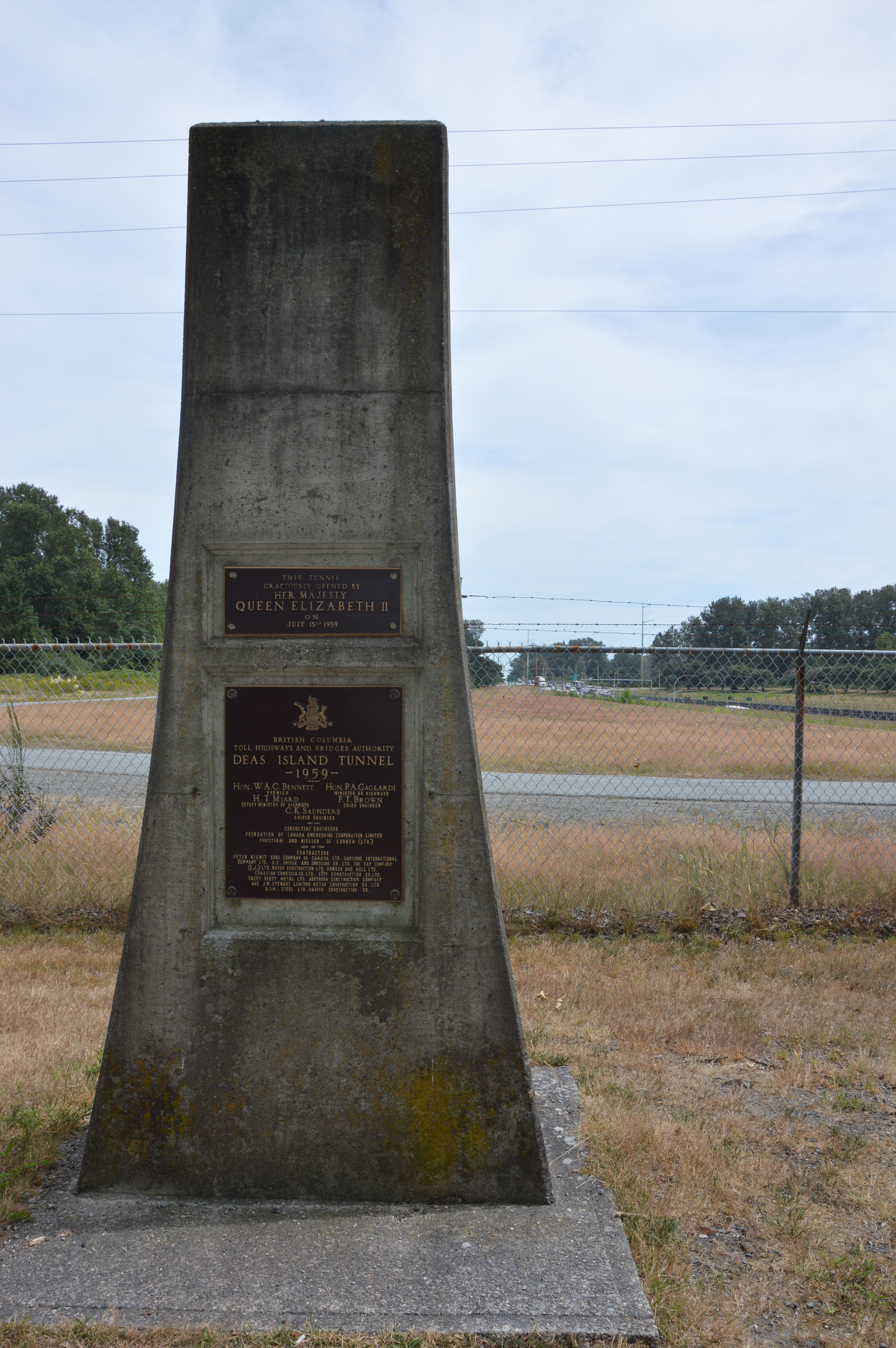
George Massey Tunnel dedication plaque

The George Massey Tunnel (often referred to as the Massey Tunnel) is a highway traffic tunnel in the Metro Vancouver region of southwestern British Columbia carrying Highway 99 beneath the south arm of the Fraser River. It is located approximately 20 km (12.4 mi) south of the city centre of Vancouver, British Columbia, and approximately 30 km (18.6 mi) north of the Canada–United States border at Blaine, Washington.

Construction, costing approximately $16.6 million in 1959 ($439.4 million in 2025), began on the tunnel in March 1957, and it was opened to traffic on May 23, 1959 as the Deas Island Tunnel. Queen Elizabeth II attended the official opening ceremony of the tunnel on July 15, 1959. It carries a four-lane divided highway under the south arm of the Fraser River estuary, joining the City of Richmond to the north with the City of Delta to the south. It is the only road tunnel below sea level in Canada, making its roadway the lowest road surface in Canada. The Massey Tunnel was the first to use immersed tube technology in British Columbia.

The tunnel forms part of Highway 99. It is named for Nehamiah "George" Massey, a former Member of the Legislative Assembly of British Columbia. He represented Delta between 1956 and 1960, and was a long-time advocate of a permanent crossing to replace the Ladner Ferry that crossed the south arm of the Fraser River. The tunnel was renamed the George Massey Tunnel in 1967, three years after Massey died. It is still sometimes referred to by its previous name, the Deas Island Tunnel. Dangerous goods are not allowed to pass through the tunnel.

== Earlier proposals ==
Winter ice floes and spring flooding, which made ferry navigation hazardous, prompted the demand for a bridge. In 1927, the BC legislature authorized the Fraser River Bridge Company to build a toll bridge linking Ladner to Lulu Island. In 1931, despite opposition that wanted the crossing located at New Westminster, the province fixed the site of the proposed crossing at or near Deas Island. The Municipality of Richmond, engaging the Ladner Bridge Company, submitted to government plans for the $2,600,000 toll bridge. That year, the federal government authorized construction of connecting highways, financing was in place, and preliminary construction work commenced. Ongoing opposition from the New Westminster municipality, and a change in the provincial government in 1933, changed the proposed location in 1934 to become the Pattullo Bridge at New Westminster.

== Configuration ==
Cross-section diagram of the George Massey Tunnel

The tunnel is a single tube that is subdivided with a concrete wall, each side containing two traffic lanes. The typical traffic flow has two northbound lanes in the east tube and two southbound lanes in the west tube. On January 28, 1981, a reversible lane system was introduced to meet increasing traffic demand in the tunnel. A bus lane was also added to the approaches a few months earlier as part of the $2.5 million program.

At peak rush traffic periods, a reversible lane system is used, with a series of swing gates deployed that direct traffic in one direction to a single lane, while increasing the other direction to three lanes. Morning rush has three lanes northbound (inbound to Vancouver) and evening rush has three southbound lanes (outbound from Vancouver).

== Construction and maintenance ==
The tunnel is 629 m (2,064 ft) long and made up of six precast concrete sections (length: 344 ft (104.9 m); height: 24 ft (7.3 m); width: 78 ft (23.8 m)). The sections were floated into position by barge and then sunk into a shallow trench that had been dug into the loose sand and silt of the river bed. The trench and tunnel sections were then covered over with a protective layer of rock—500-pound (230 kg) stones filled 50 feet (15.24 m) out on each side, plus a bed of 1,500-pound (680 kg) stones on top. A structure located at each end of the tunnel houses the main ventilation and pumping equipment. Concrete retaining walls make up the approaches, which extend out about 400 m (1,312 ft) from the ventilation buildings. At its lowest point the roadway is about 22 metres (72 ft) below sea level, making it the lowest section of roadway in Canada. The Fraser River flows into the Strait of Georgia about 5 kilometres (3.1 mi) downstream from the tunnel.

Due to the tunnel being designed and constructed in the 1950s, very little consideration was given to seismic factors. The river bed is a 600 m (1,969 ft) thick layer of sediment on top of bedrock. This sedimentary layer may liquefy during a major earthquake, leaving the tunnel with nothing to rest on, and thus vulnerable to total collapse. In the early 2000s, as the awareness of the effect of serious seismic activity developed, an engineering assessment and subsequent retrofit project was initiated to increase the survivability of the tunnel in the event of a significant earthquake. This retrofit project started in late 2004 and had been completed in November 2006.

In the interest of providing active protection for commuters from the danger earthquakes pose to the tunnel, an earthquake early warning system called Shakealarm was installed and commissioned in 2009. This was the first application of a commercialized earthquake early warning system (EEWS) to protect critical infrastructure in North America. Capable of detecting earthquakes with seconds to minutes of warning time the installation on George Massey Tunnel is designed to close the gates at either end of the tunnel so that no one can enter if a dangerous quake is inbound, and those already inside can exit as normal before shaking begins.

The tunnel was constructed for the British Columbia Toll Highways and Bridge Authority, and is now administered by the British Columbia Ministry of Transportation. It has not had a toll on it since the 1960s, when tolls were removed from all of the bridges and tunnels in the Lower Mainland. The initial toll was 25 cents; on March 31, 1964, George Massey became the last person to pay the toll, which was then $1.

== Non-motorized tunnel use ==
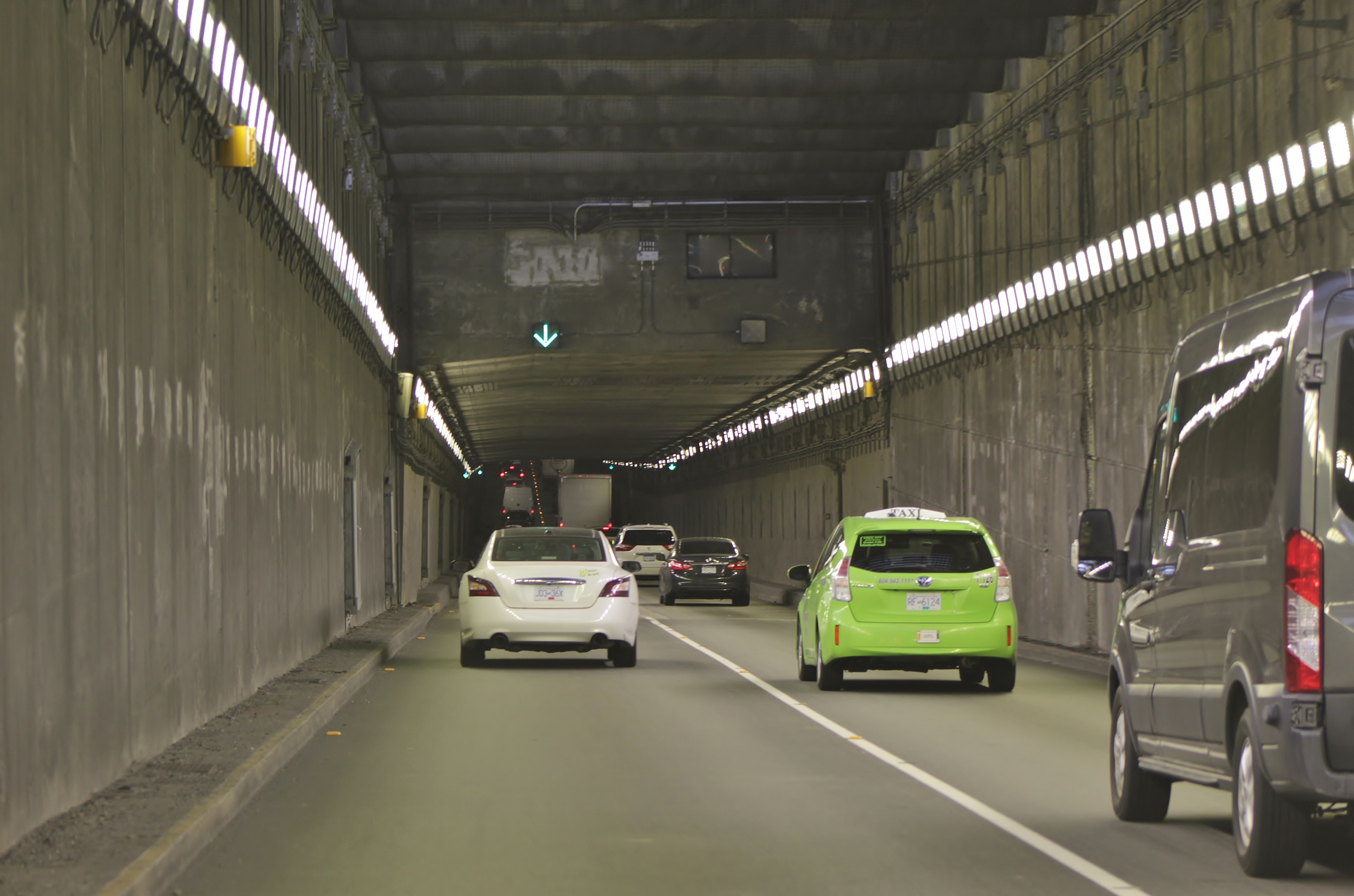
Southbound in the tunnel

The tunnel is illegal for cyclists or pedestrians to traverse. A limited fare-free shuttle service is available year-round, during certain hours, and can carry tandems. Cyclists must wait at prescribed pickup points, but the van will make more than one trip if there are more than seven bicycles. TransLink also provides year-round regular bus service through the tunnel with standard two-bike carrying racks. However, the lack of sufficient rack space translates to long waits for cyclists during peak hours. Cycling advocates have long advocated for improvement to this facility, as it is a major choke point limiting Vancouver-to-Tsawwassen Ferry bicycle traffic. Progress was made in June 2022 with the introduction of a "Bike Bus" route operated by TransLink. The bus had space for 9 bicycles and operated between late June until Labour Day on a route connecting Tsawwassen ferry terminal and Bridgeport station. The service was brought back for the 2023 season between late June and Labour Day.

== Height limit ==
The tunnel has a posted height limit of 4.15 m (13 ft 7 3/8 in) in both directions. The replacement bridge, which was to be constructed starting in 2017, would have likely eliminated the current height restrictions for over-height vehicles in the tunnel. On January 10, 2024, an oversized truck struck the roof of the overpass but did not cause any significant damage.

== Replacement ==
On February 16, 2006, it was reported that the provincial government had plans to expand the tunnel's capacity, from four lanes to six, dubbed the "H99" project. On September 28, 2012, Premier Christy Clark announced plans to replace the aging tunnel within 10 years, addressing the congestion and safety issues currently plaguing the structure. On November 21, 2012, it was announced that the Ministry of Transportation and Infrastructure is leading a multi-stage planning initiative, including seeking public input on replacement options for the tunnel to determine a number of options for its replacement.

On September 20, 2013, Premier Clark announced that construction on a new bridge to replace the tunnel will begin in 2017. On December 16, 2015, British Columbia Transportation Minister Todd Stone announced detailed plans to spend $3.5 billion on a bridge and interchange improvements to replace the tunnel. In July 2016 the BC Environmental Assessment Office (EAO) started an environmental assessment of the project and on February 9, 2017, the replacement received environment approval from the B.C. Ministry of Environment. Preliminary work went out for tender in January 2017 to start the process of improving ground conditions for the future widening of the project area.

The Metro Vancouver mayors spoke out against the replacement plan in June 2016, marking "the first time the mayors, who make up the Metro Vancouver Board, have spoken out collectively against the $3.5-billion crossing." The mayors sent a letter to the B.C. government and the federal Minister of Environment and Climate Change, Catherine McKenna, to get the federal government to do an environmental review of the project. In February 2017, the federal government denied the request of the mayors for a federal review. The official groundbreaking for the project took place on April 5, 2017, and was met with protesters.

Following their victory in the 2017 general election, the NDP Premier John Horgan scrapped the project in favour of a solution with more research and consultation with the Metro Vancouver mayors. The Metro Vancouver mayors recommended a new eight-lane tunnel in 2019 as the replacement of the Massey Tunnel. On August 18, 2021, the provincial government announced the go ahead of the new eight-lane tunnel with a pedestrian and bicycle carriageway, subject to Indigenous consultation and environmental approvals.

The toll-free, eight-lane tunnel is scheduled for completion in 2030 with a projected cost of $4.15 billion. The provincial government has proposed that the George Massey Tunnel be filled with sand in lieu of full removal after the replacement is completed, or reused for BC Hydro electrical lines.

== See also ==
- List of crossings of the Fraser River
- Tsawwassen ferry terminal — major periodic traffic source
