= Public art in Vancouver =

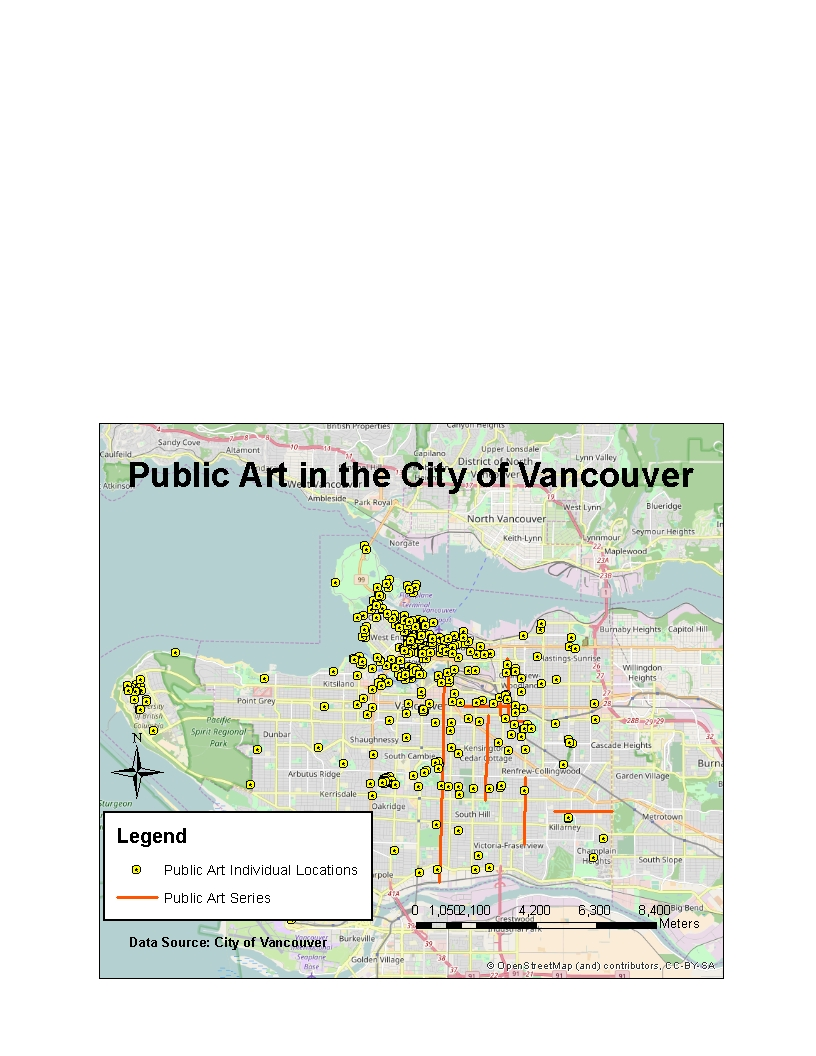
Map of public art locations in the City of Vancouver.

Public art in Vancouver is an important aspect of the urban environment. Large portions of public art in the city – located in British Columbia, Canada – are funded by the provincial and federal government. Up to 1% of the budget of a building can go towards the construction of public art.

== Public Art Program ==
Vancouver's Public Art Program seeks to incorporate contemporary art practices into city planning and development. The program supports art-making of many kinds – emerging and established artists, in new and traditional media, from stand-alone commissions to artist collaborations. The program is part of Cultural Services and oversees development of public art opportunities throughout the city. Civic projects at civic buildings, greenways, parks and other public spaces are funded through capital budgets. Private sector projects are funded by developments in the rezoning process.

Coinciding with the 2010 Vancouver Olympics, the Public Art Program has commissioned various local artists to produce works, with projects such as Paul Wong's 5 project.

== Works ==
- A-maze-ing Laughter (Yue Minjun)
- Aerodynamic Forms in Space (Rodney Graham)
- The Birds (Myfanwy Macleod)
- Bust of David Oppenheimer
- Chehalis Cross
- Digital Orca (Douglas Coupland)
- The Drop (Inges Idee)
- Dude Chilling Park (Viktor Briestensky)
- East Van Cross
- Engagement (Dennis Oppenheim)
- Freezing Water Number 7 (Ren Jun)
- Gate to the Northwest Passage (Alan Chung Hung)
- Girl in a Wetsuit (Elek Imredy)
- Inukshuk (Alvin Kanak)
- Japanese Canadian War Memorial
- King Edward VII Memorial Fountain (Charles Marega)
- LightShed (Liz Magor)
- Nike (Pavlos Angelos Kougioumtzis)
- Penis Satan
- Robert Burns Memorial, Stanley Park (George Anderson Lawson)
- Statue of George Vancouver (Marega)
- Statue of Harry Jerome (Jack Harman)
- Statue of John Deighton (Vern Simpson)
