= Fraser Street Bridge (1894) =

Fraser St. Bridge
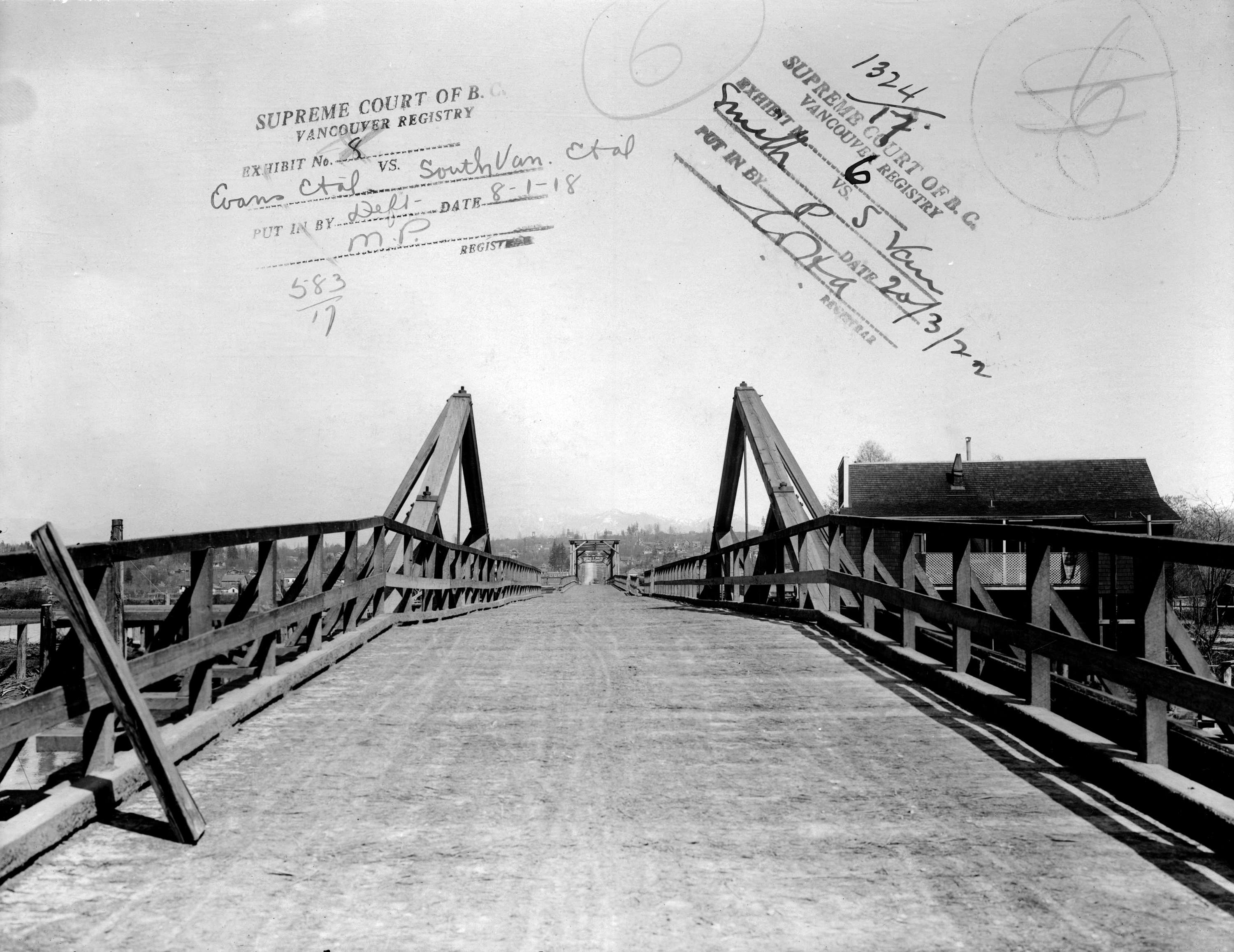
- Northward onto approach from Lulu Island, 1918
- Coordinates: 49°11′53″N 123°05′28″W
- Carries: Vehicular traffic, pedestrians
- Crosses: Fraser River north arm
- Locale: Sunset-Richmond

Characteristics
- Design: Truss bridges

History
- Inaugurated: 1894

Location
- Interactive map of Fraser St. Bridge

The Fraser St. Bridge (1894–1974), also known as the Fraser Ave. Bridge, North Arm Bridge, No. 5 Rd. Bridge, or Twigg Island Bridge, was a crossing over the north arm of the Fraser River in Metro Vancouver.

== History ==
=== Local government burden ===
Laid in 1875, North Arm Rd. (now Fraser St.) connected the Fraser River farming area to the False Creek Trail (now Kingsway). Opened in 1894, the low-level two-lane bridge linked North Arm Road with No. 5 Rd., Richmond. Just north of the structure's midway point, ramps provided access to Twigg Island (now the western part of Mitchell Island). The south channel comprised the fixed link, and the north one included the swing span, measuring 55 feet (17 m), that lengthened to 70 feet (21 m) in the 1905 rebuild. During the 1894 Fraser flood, floating debris destroyed more than half the southern section, causing $2,000 damage. The province made a $1,000 contribution the following year toward similar repairs.

Weight limits placed in 1896 restricted traffic to one loaded wagon at a time. The speed limit for automobiles was 3 mph (4.8 km/h). In 1911, 11 people were charged with trotting their horses across the structure. At this time, driving a horse across many bridges at faster than walking pace was an offence. In those early years, the bridge tender slotted an iron bar into a capstan, and slowly walked around it 25 times to open or close the span. Shifts were 12 hours long. During high winds, even with assistance from motorists, the process could double the usual 15 minutes. From 1948, an electric motor performed this function.

North Arm Rd. became Fraser St in 1910, according to Elizbeth Walker, through a bylaw of South Vancouver municipality. However, the name Fraser Ave. Bridge continued in use by much of the public for decades, and was used officially until 1968. The bridge appears to have been a joint responsibility of the municipalities of South Vancouver and Richmond. The part of South Vancouver west of Cambie St. (formerly Bridge St.), but cutting west at 59th Ave. (formerly Essex St.) and south beside Ash St., formed the separate municipality of Point Grey in 1908. The eastern part, lacking a strong revenue base, faced financial collapse, which included an inability to pay its share of upkeep costs for the bridge. However, when a 1916 ice floe destroyed 160 feet (49 m) of the bridge, South Vancouver did pay half the $1,128 repairs.

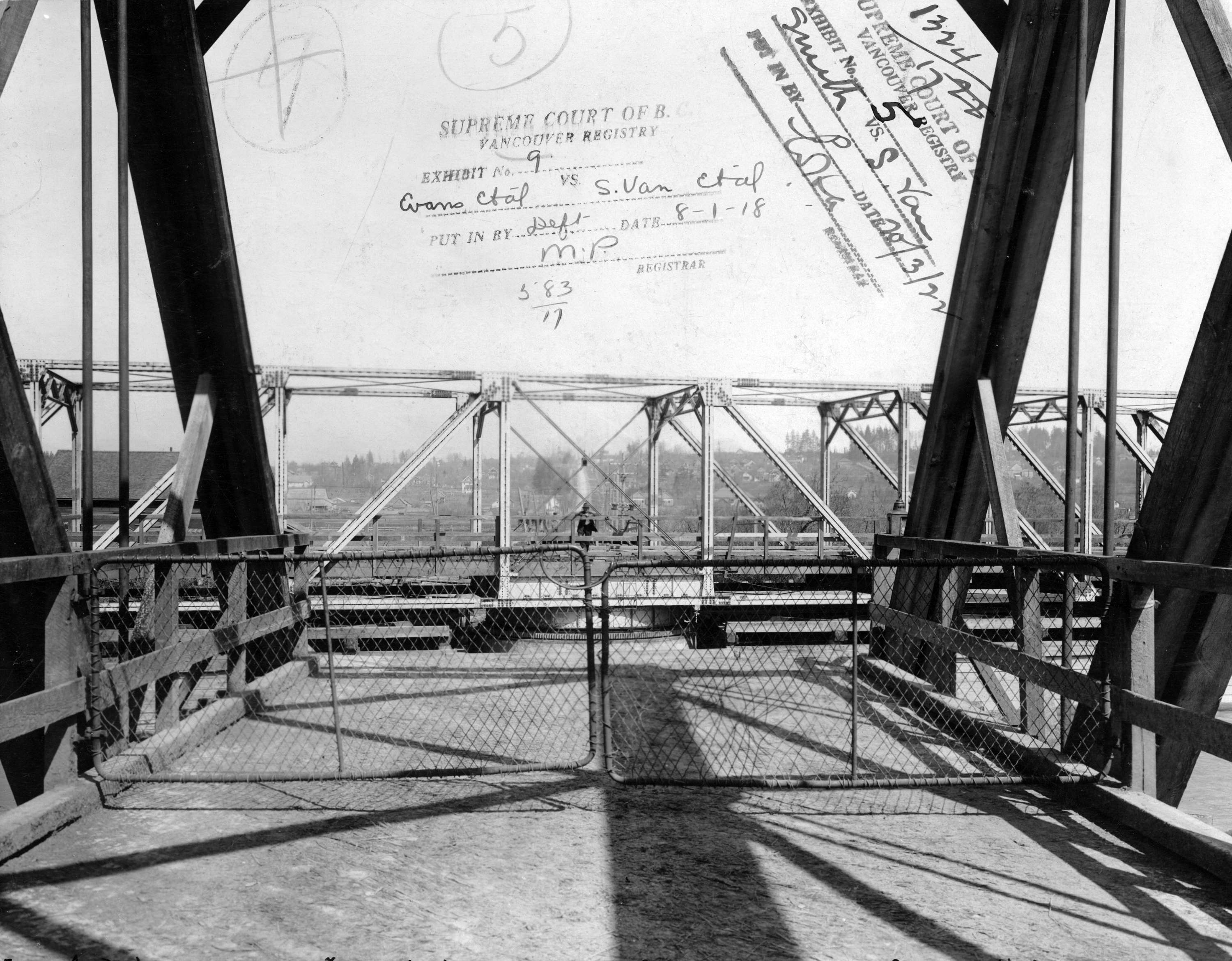
Fraser Avenue Bridge, open span position, 1918

On a clear moonlit November evening that year, a jitney operating as a bus from the Ladner Ferry, was driving at an excessive speed of 10–15 mph. Failing to observe the red light showing for some time, it crashed through the light iron gates, travelled a further 20 feet (6.1 m), and plunged into the river. Two men and a little girl were rescued. The nine who perished, included driver George Smith, and Annie Evans and her older daughter, whose family brought the legal action. Smith was familiar with the bridge's fixed red and green light warning configuration that rotated with the swing span to control both river and roadway traffic. The gate, formerly positioned 10 feet (3 m) from the brink, had saved a truck during a prior incident. Although the province built the bridge, Richmond paid half the $40,000 construction cost, and subsequently operated and maintained the crossing. A jury found the two municipalities and the driver equally liable. However, the trial judge gave judgment against Richmond alone, awarding $5,000 to the bereaved family. The Court of Appeal, equally divided as to Richmond's negligence, dismissed the action. The Privy Council, which met in August 1919, upheld the earlier verdicts.

In 1917, the municipalities asked the province to take over the bridge, Richmond having spent $20,000 on maintenance. Being on the direct route to the ferry, Delta residents equally benefitted. During the latter part of that year, the longer southern section was open, but the damaged northern part was closed to vehicles.

In 1918, a new Howe truss span was installed. That year, the province ousted the whole South Vancouver council, appointing Francis Joseph Gillespie, as commissioner, to reorganize the municipal finances. In December 1919, when Gillespie wanted the municipality to assume equal liability for the Evans' case, residents were angry.

According to one account, tragedy again struck in 1921, when nine jitney passengers also plunged to their deaths at an open span. The two municipalities equally contributed to the $30,000 damages award. Tug/barge/log boom collisions, periods of closure, repairs, and ongoing maintenance disproportionately burdened Richmond, because appeals for provincial aid yielded limited results.

=== Provincial government headache ===
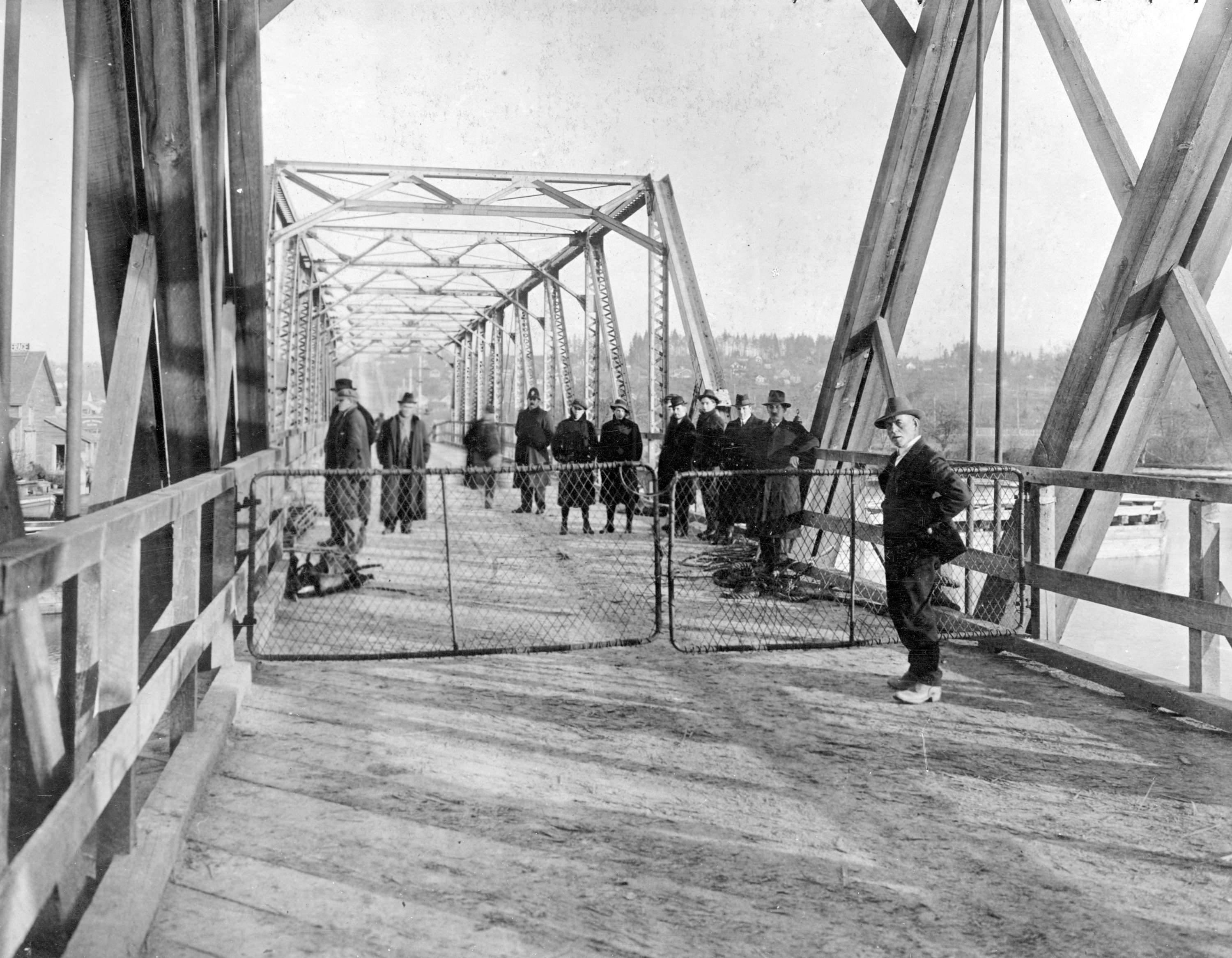
Fraser Avenue Bridge, closed span position, 1919

In 1929, the province finally agreed to assume responsibility for the bridge and No. 5 Rd. That year, South Vancouver and Point Grey amalgamated with Vancouver. After the 1931 rebuild, the bridge was described as a 20-foot (6.1 m) wide asphaltic-concrete roadway with a sidewalk, 150-foot (46 m) Howe truss span, and pile-trestle approaches.

Chung Chuck, a Delta potato farmer, who disputed the authority of the marketing board, disregarded the respective regulations. In 1937, he knifed Earl A McKay, a board inspector, during a skirmish at the bridge. The instigating party unclear, both they, and some non-Chinese involved in the incident, faced assault charges.

In official classification, the north section was bridge No. 6 and the south one No. 8. A guard patrolled the crossing at the start of World War II. In 1941–42, the No. 8 deck was replaced and asphalted. The next year, a new cabin was built for the bridge tenders. In 1944–45, impact damage from a barge required rebuilding the No. 6 downstream pier. Two years later, the No. 6 deck was replaced.

During 1949–51, extensive maintenance occurred. In 1951–52, new steel open-grid type decking was installed on the swing span, and protection dolphins for the trestle approaches. In 1954–55, the No. 6 deck approaches were replaced and a non-skid seal coat applied to both bridge decks. In 1955, after sustaining severe damage from a barge collision, a fractured Howe truss and the sidewalk were replaced, and the sway bracing renewed, during the three-and-a-half-week closure. To avoid tolls on Oak Street Bridge (opened in 1957), most traffic initially used the Fraser Street Bridge, causing massive congestion. During 1958–60, the No. 8 was redecked and resurfaced.

A 1963 election campaign promise included a replacement bridge. That year, police investigated written and telephone threats made to tug boat operators by irate motorists delayed by the frequent span openings. The next year, the No. 8 was redecked and paved. In 1965, the swing span mechanism underwent extensive repairs, and a $10m replacement bridge was affirmed. The following year, an empty barge took out the No. 8 centre span. A truck driver, and seven children standing on the bridge, plunged into the Fraser. The driver escaped by smashing a window of his submerged truck. All were rescued. The collision cut a gas pipeline and phone cable. A single-lane Bailey bridge was floated into position within 26 hours, but a permanent centre span was not floated into position until nine months later.

During the planning and construction stages, the Knight Street Bridge (opened in 1974) was known as the Fraser St. Bridge replacement. Construction began in 1969. The following year, fire destroyed the fixed-span No. 8., closing the bridge for almost four weeks. Labour alone for the reconstruction totalled $115,000. Two weeks after the Knight St. Bridge opened, the Fraser St. one closed to vehicles. Over the next three years, demolition cost about $230,000. The steel truss became part of a bridge located elsewhere.

Some images.

== See also ==
- List of crossings of the Fraser River
