= Knight Street =

- Knight Street's freeway portion highlighted in red.
- Maintained by: TransLink, City of Vancouver
- Length: 9.8 km (6.1 mi)
- Location: Vancouver, Richmond
- South end: Westminster Highway
- Major junctions: Highway 91; SE Marine Drive; Kingsway
- North end: Clark Drive

Construction
- Inauguration: 1974

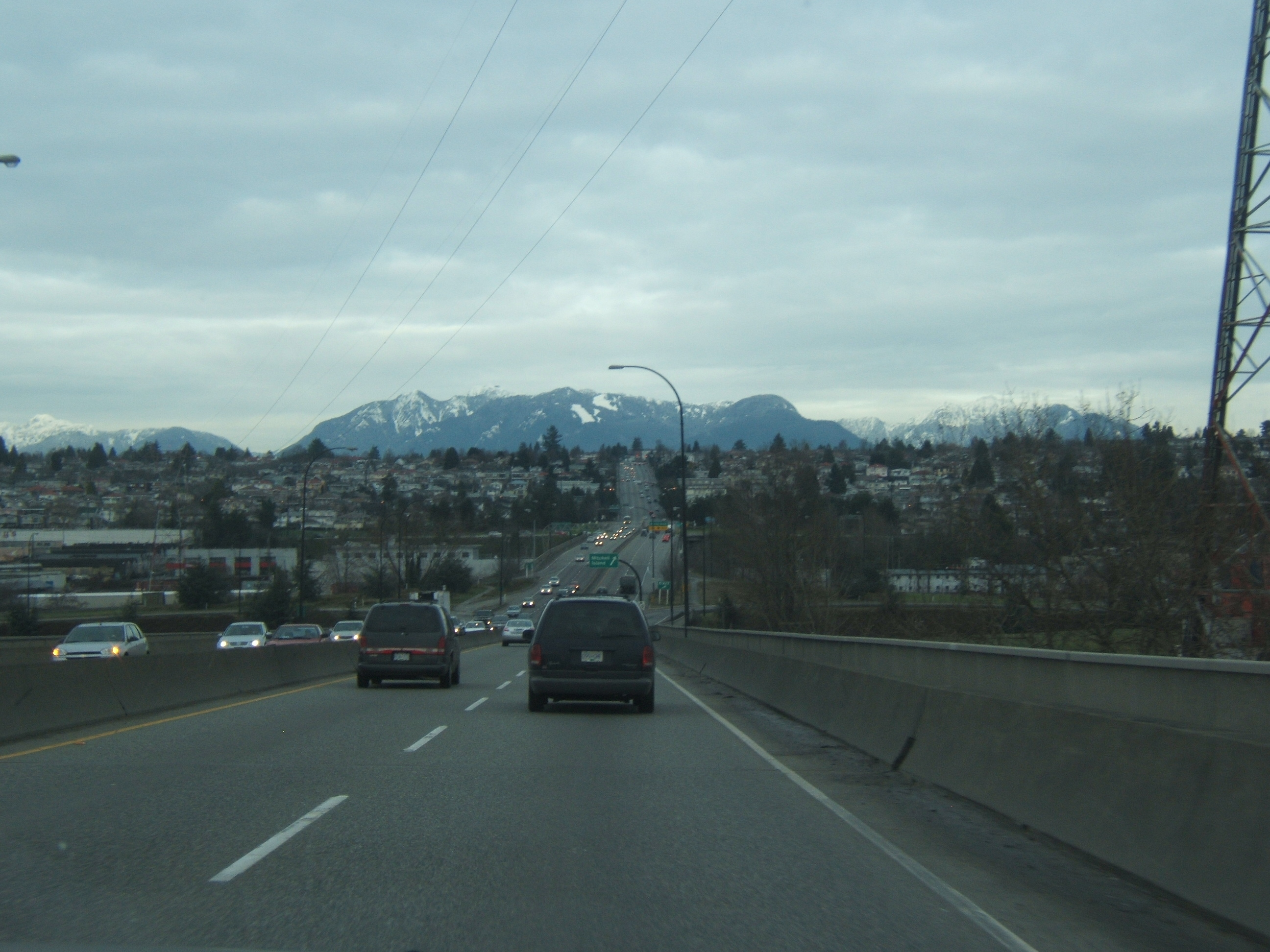
Knight Street Bridge facing north towards Vancouver

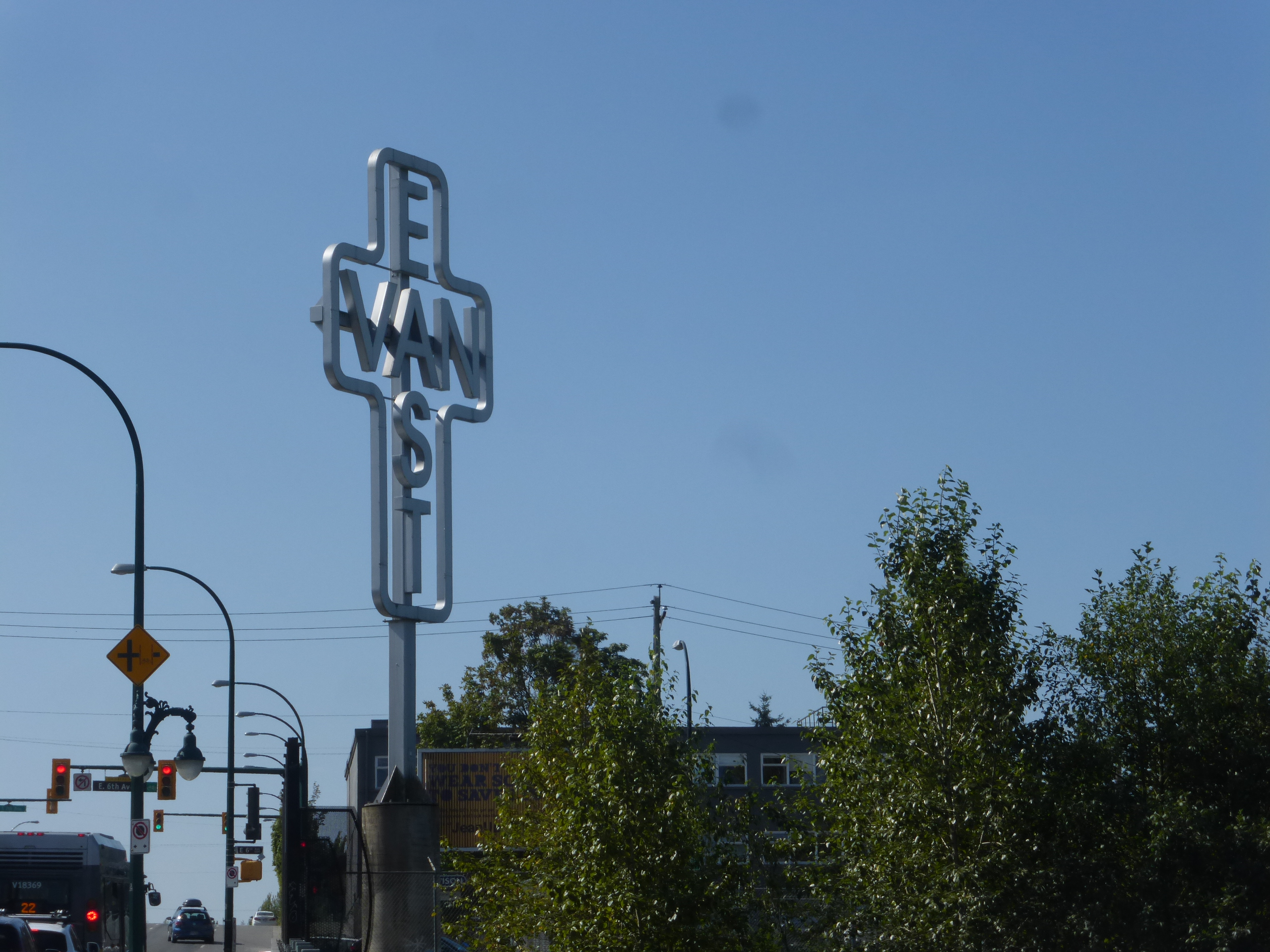
Monument for East Vancouver located near Clark Dr & 6th Ave

Knight Street is a major north-south roadway in Vancouver and Richmond, British Columbia, Canada. It is a four-to-six lane freeway from Westminster Highway in Richmond to Marine Drive in Vancouver, thus serving as an alternate way to exit Vancouver southbound, rather than the Granville Street/Oak Street corridor. Upon entering Vancouver, Knight Street provides major access routes to East Vancouver; at 14th Avenue, the road turns into Clark Drive, and runs northbound until it reaches the Port of Vancouver at Burrard Inlet. It is the busiest truck route in Vancouver, and a key link between Vancouver and its neighbours to the south.

The freeway section of Knight Street crosses the Fraser River via the Knight Street Bridge, connecting Vancouver to Mitchell Island and Richmond. This is the only officially designated freeway in Metro Vancouver that is not also designated as a provincial highway. However, the whole length of Knight Street is part of TransLink's Major Road Network: the agency owns the Knight Street Bridge, and provides funding to the cities of Vancouver and Richmond for maintenance and major projects on the rest of the street.

The street has become a favourite for street racers in the Vancouver area probably because of its long straight bridge, though the police presence has recently improved to thwart this activity. The intersection of Knight Street and Southeast Marine Drive, at the northern end of Knight Street Bridge, ranked among the top ten motor-vehicle crash sites in all of British Columbia in 2008.

The Knight Street (formerly known as Knight Road) was named after Robert Knight, a property owner in South Vancouver in the late 19th and early 20th centuries. Clark Drive is named after Ephraim James Clark, a realtor who donated land to the city for a park in 1889.

== Major intersections ==
The entire route is in Metro Vancouver Regional District.

Location	km	mi	Destinations	Notes
Richmond	0.0	0.0	Westminster Highway	
Richmond	0.8	0.50	Highway 91 to Highway 99 – Delta, Surrey, BC Ferries (Tsawwassen), USA Border	Interchange; southbound exit and northbound entrance
Richmond	2.0	1.2	Jacombs Road	Southbound exit only
Richmond	2.4	1.5	Bridgeport Road – Vancouver International Airport	Interchange
Richmond	2.8– 3.9	1.7– 2.4	Knight Street Bridge over Fraser River North Arm	
Richmond	4.0	2.5	Mitchell Island (Mitchell Road)	Interchange
Richmond–Vancouver boundary	4.1– 4.4	2.5– 2.7	Knight Street Bridge over the Fraser River North Arm	
Vancouver	4.6	2.9	Southeast Marine Drive	Interchange
Vancouver	7.0	4.3	East 41st Avenue	
Vancouver	8.7	5.4	King Edward Avenue	
Vancouver	8.9	5.5	Kingsway	Former Highway 1A / Highway 99A
Vancouver	9.8	6.1	East 14th Avenue	Becomes Clark Drive
Vancouver	10.0	6.2	East 12th Avenue	To Highway 1 east
Vancouver	10.3	6.4	E Broadway (Highway 7)	
Vancouver	10.6	6.6	East 6th Avenue (to Great Northern Way)	VCC–Clark station
Vancouver	11.1	6.9	East 1st Avenue (to Terminal Avenue)	To Highway 1
Vancouver	12.4	7.7	East Hastings Street	Former Highway 7A
Vancouver	12.5	7.8	Port of Vancouver	Grade separated, left exit; northbound exit and southbound entrance
Vancouver	12.6	7.8	Powell Street	
1.000 mi = 1.609 km; 1.000 km = 0.621 mi: Incomplete access; Route transition
