= Michael Dennis (artist) =

Artist

Michael Dennis (born 1941 in Los Angeles) is a Canadian-American artist. His best-known work is Reclining Figure, exhibited in Vancouver's Guelph Park since 1991 and considered "a famous East Vancouver icon" as well as a "focal point of the neighbourhood". His works often involve "large forms from wood left behind by loggers that in some cases are carved to suggest anthropomorphic forms".

Educated at Reed College and Stanford University as a neurophysiologist, he taught at Harvard Medical School and was a Research Fellow at University College London before working as Professor at University of California San Francisco from 1972 to 1979. Leaving science to devote himself to art, he has lived on Denman Island in British Columbia since the 1980s. He was formerly married to American developmental biologist Victoria Foe.

His work is held by Simon Fraser University, University of British Columbia, Olympic College, Seattle Vocational Institute and University of Washington, where some examples are on public display. Other public pieces can be seen on Denman Island and in Bellevue Downtown Park.
