= Engagement (sculpture) =

Sculpture series by Dennis Oppenheim

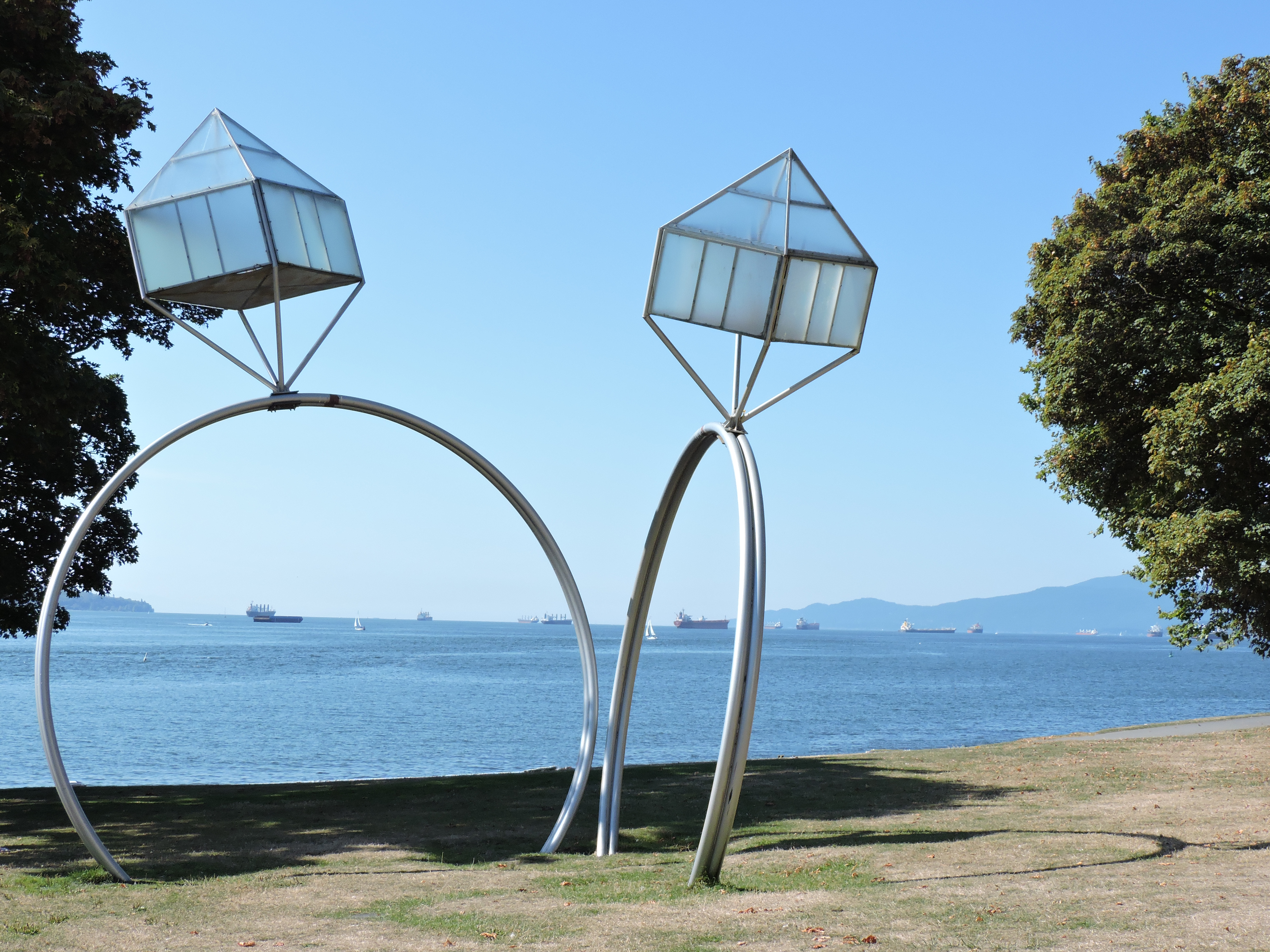
- The sculpture in Vancouver in 2014
- Year: 2005
- Type: Sculpture
- Medium: Aluminum, steel, plexiglass
- Location: Vancouver, British Columbia; 49.28222°N 123.141157°W

Engagement is a series of sculptures by Dennis Oppenheim depicting two diamond engagement rings. One version was installed in 2005 at Sunset Beach in Vancouver, British Columbia, Canada. Others are at the Nevada Museum of Art in Reno, Nevada, San Diego, California, Ruoholahti, Finland, Sha Tin, Hong Kong, and Leoben, Austria.

== Description and history ==
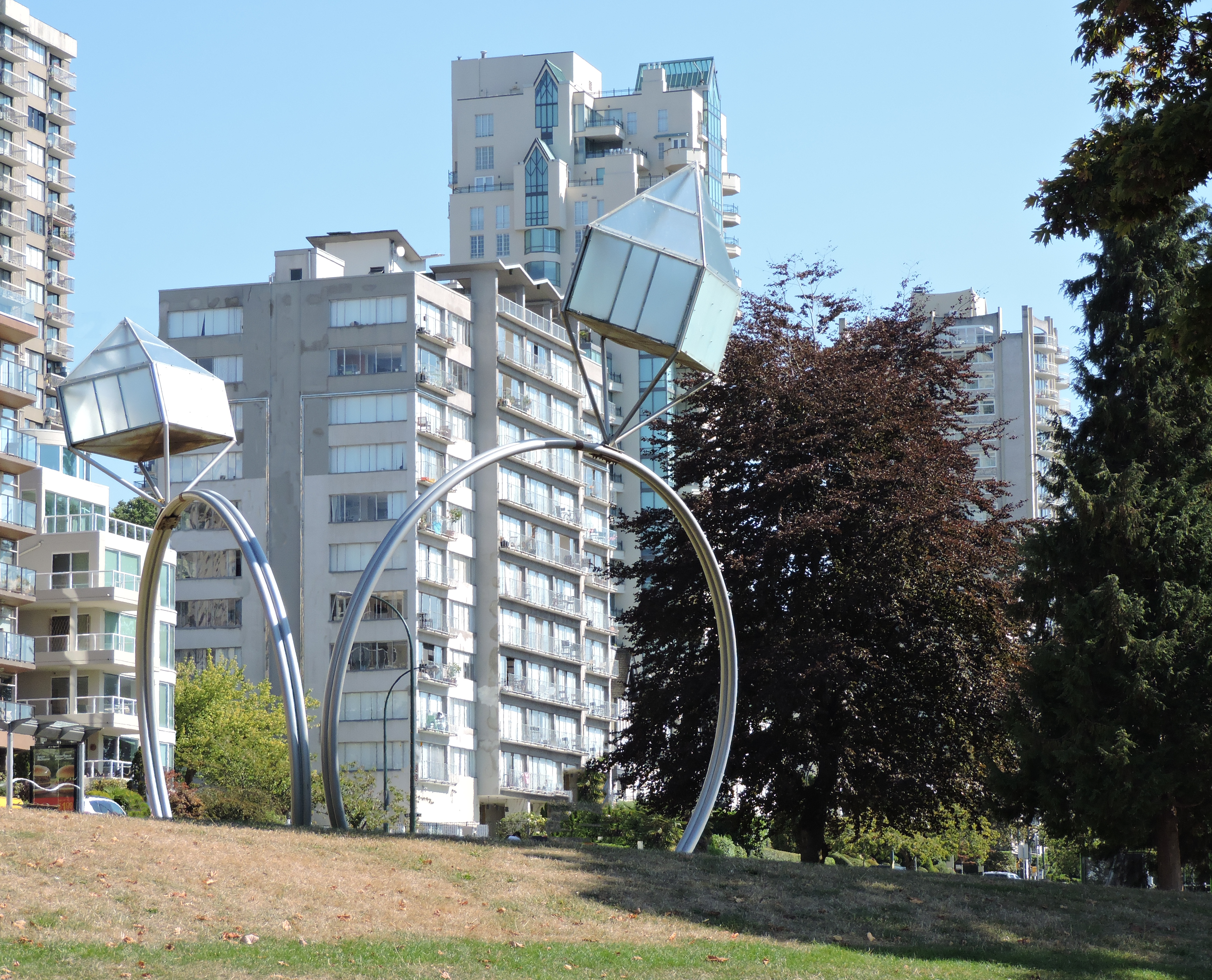
The sculpture in 2014

Engagement, installed at Sunset Beach in 2005, depicts two diamond engagement rings and stands nearly 30 feet tall. The diamonds, illuminated and tilting away from one another, are composed of translucent plexiglass boxes, steel and aluminum. The Vancouver Biennale described the sculpture as pop art. Engagement is one of several sculptures by Oppenheim that has been installed in Vancouver: The Device to Root Out Evil an upside-down aluminum church, was installed along the waterfront in Coal Harbour from 2005 to 2008, and Arriving Home was displayed within Vancouver International Airport as part of the 2009–2011 Vancouver Biennale.

During November 11–17, 2007, Engagement was installed along the waterfront at Laurel and Harbor Drive in San Diego, California.

== Interpretation and reception ==
Oppenheim, who often declines to explain his works, kept the meaning of Engagement ambiguous on purpose. According to the San Diego Port, the work reminds spectators that "marriage requires a balance between two people with different interests, tastes and backgrounds" and represents the "dichotomy of marriage, expressing the romantic and the melancholy".

Debates over same-sex marriage in Canada were taking place around the time the work was installed in Vancouver.

== See also ==
- 2005 in art
- Public art in Vancouver
