= Reclining Figure (Dennis) =

1991 sculpture by Michael Dennis

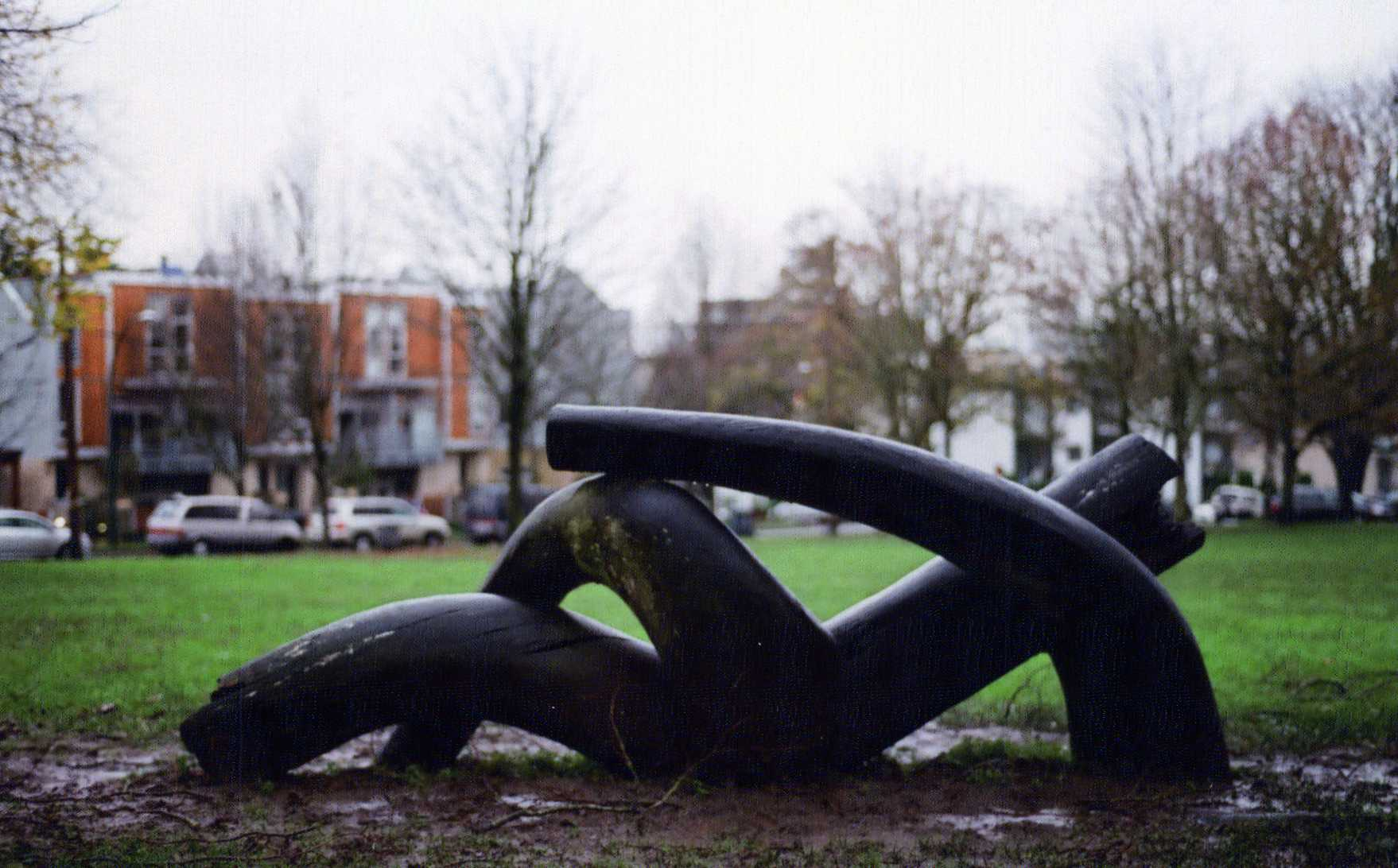
- Artist: Michael Dennis
- Year: 1991
- Medium: Bronze
- Location: Dude Chilling Park, Vancouver
- 49.264°N 123.096°W

Reclining Figure is a piece of public art exhibited in Vancouver's Guelph Park since 1991.

Created by Denman Island-based Michael Dennis, it is considered "a famous East Vancouver icon" as well as a "focal point of the neighbourhood."

"Reclining Figure" has featured in Guelph Park since 1991, leading to its facetious name, Dude Chilling Park. Initially carved in cedar, the original decayed and was replaced by a bronze cast in 2019, thanks in part to several community fundraising activities. An "update" of this sculpture was also exhibited at Van Dusen Gardens in a wood sculpture exhibit in 2013.
