= Penis Satan =

Former statue in Vancouver, Canada

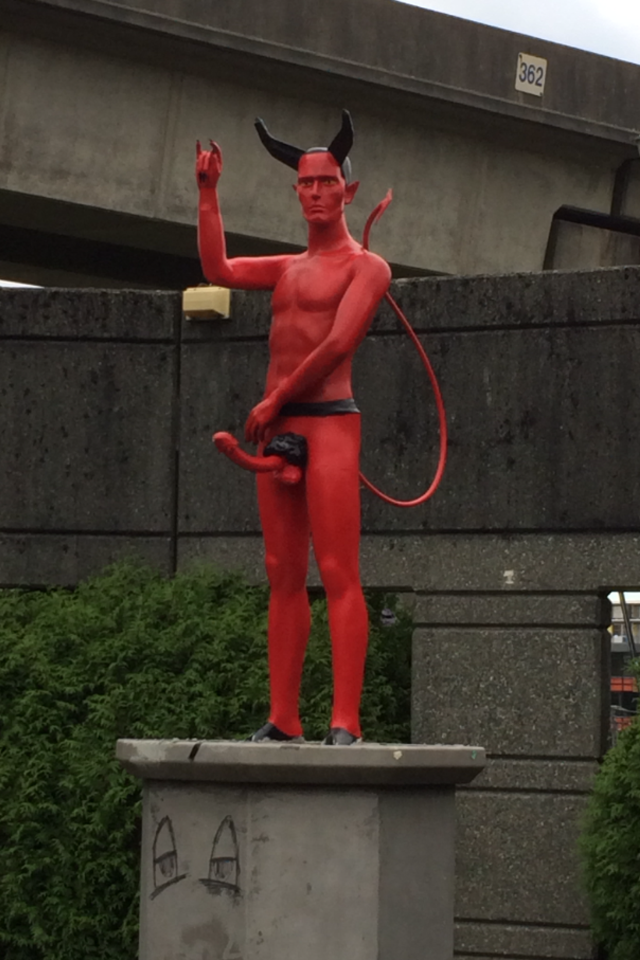
- Penis Satan. September 9, 2014, Vancouver, BC, Canada.
- 49.266347°N 123.0778735°W

Penis Satan, also called East Van Satan or Demon Ball, is a statue that was erected on September 9, 2014, in Vancouver, Canada. A life-size representation of a red devil with a large erect penis, making the sign of the horns hand gesture, the statue was erected without authorization in Clark Drive Plaza, an abandoned concrete amphitheater on the west side of Clark Drive at Grandview Highway North. It was made of mixed materials, including a modified mannequin, and was placed on an empty pedestal that previously displayed a three-foot-tall Christopher Columbus statue (honouring Angelo Branca). Vancouver commuters were able to see the statue from the Expo Line of the SkyTrain, near the East Van Cross, which is located on the opposite side of the tracks.

== Statue removal ==
Local Vancouver television stations CTV Vancouver and Global BC reported the news story as City of Vancouver Public Works employees removed the statue. As a result, several petitions were launched requesting the City of Vancouver return the statue to its original location.

== Art community reception ==
Reception from the art community was decidedly mixed, drawing strong opinions about the statue and its sexually explicit content as public art. Art market website Artnet compared the statue to "Korea's boner Spider-Man, Poland's peeing Lenin, and Oklahoma's Satanic courthouse monument".

Ammar Mahimwalla, Project Manager for the Vancouver International Sculpture Biennale, stated, "It was really well made as a piece, and whoever put it there did a good job of putting it in. ... With the city, sometimes, there is censorship – at some level – of what art means and what art is."

Bryan Newson, Public Art Program Manager for the City of Vancouver, commented, "It was one of those wonderful, spontaneous interventions by – I think – a prankster. ... I couldn't help laughing, obviously it could not remain in the public realm."

When asked if the Vancouver Art Gallery would have housed the statue, its spokesperson Hanah Van Borek replied, "I sincerely doubt we would ever have this on view."

== Artist ==
In 2019, an anonymous artist with the pseudonym "Obsidian" claimed responsibility for the statue.
