= Sunset Beach (Vancouver) =

Beach in Vancouver, British Columbia, Canada

- Beach
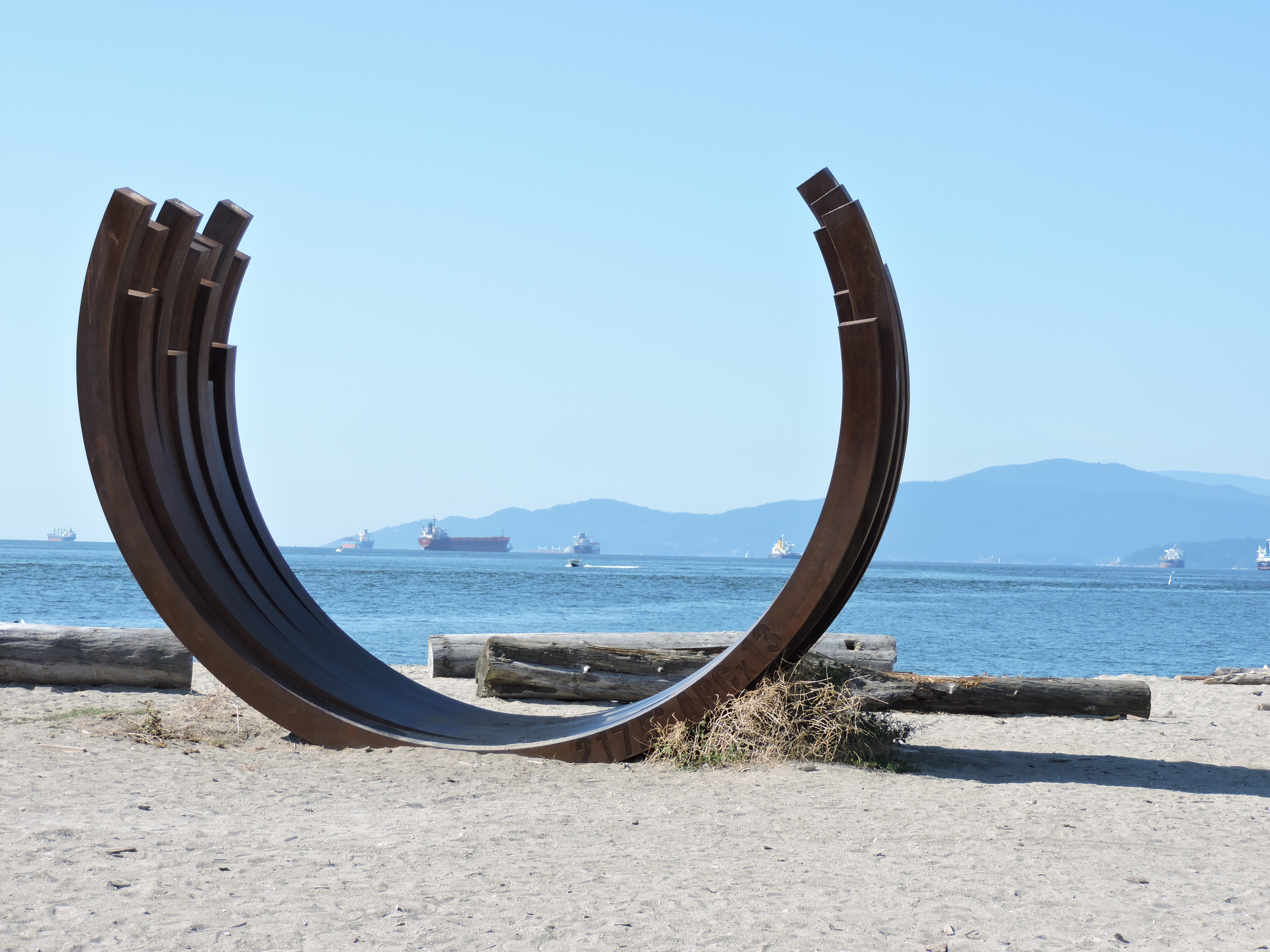
- A sculpture by artist Bernar Venet on Sunset Beach

- Location within Greater Vancouver Regional District
- Coordinates: 49.27986°N 123.13861°W
- Location: Vancouver, British Columbia
- Website: vancouver.ca/parks-recreation-culture/sunset-beach.aspx

Sunset Beach is an urban beach park on English Bay situated in the West End neighbourhood of Vancouver, British Columbia, Canada. It is part of the city seawall system and is bisected by a multi-use path for bicycling, walking, and skating that connects to the adjacent Vancouver Aquatic Centre and Burrard Street Bridge. The park is maintained by the city government and includes public washrooms, concession stands, an off-leash area for dogs, and a False Creek Ferries dock. Between May and September, lifeguards are posted at the beach.

The beach hosted an unofficial 420 protest annually on April 20 in the late 2010s. It is a popular location for watching Celebration of Light, an annual fireworks display. The beach's indigenous name is Í7iy̓el̓shn ("ee-ay-ul-shun"), which means "soft underfoot" in the Squamish language.

On November 15, 2021, a 61-metre (200 ft) barge washed ashore at Sunset Beach during regional floods after it broke free from its moored position. Described as a "celebrity", the barge became a local landmark that inspired memes, songs, and parodies. The Vancouver Park Board installed a "Barge Chilling Beach", a reference to Dude Chilling Park, but it was removed after being painted over with the beach's indigenous name. Proposals to dismantle the barge were first submitted in January 2022, but approval was delayed due to the discovery of a goose nest and concerns of lead contamination from the hull paint among other issues. Removal began on July 25, 2022, and was completed over three months later at a cost of $2.4 million.

== See also ==
- Engagement (sculpture)
