= Dude Chilling Park =

Public artwork in Vancouver, British Columbia, Canada

- Public art installation
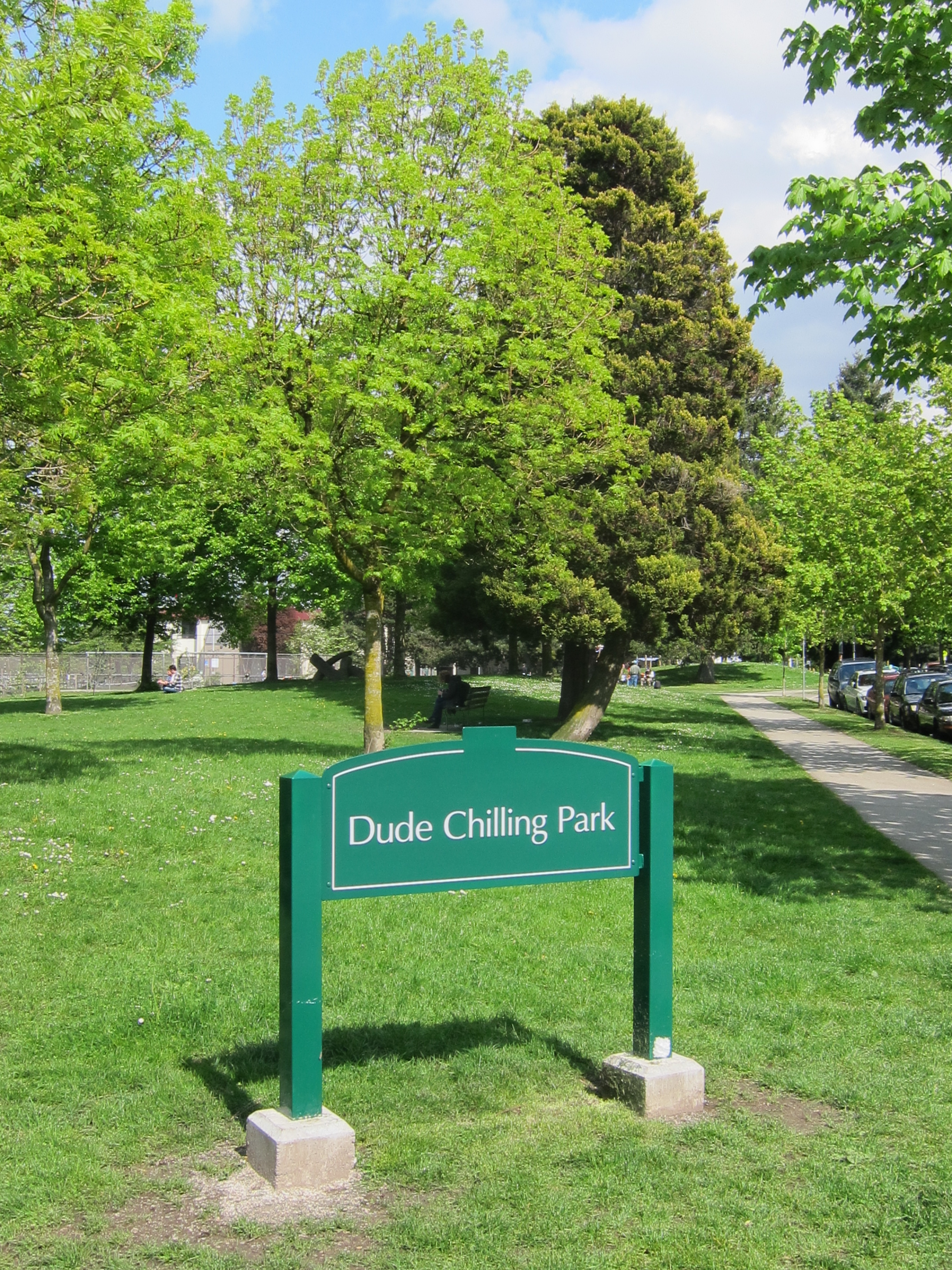
- Sign installation at the west end of Guelph Park
- Design: Viktor Briestensky
- Constructed: November 2012
- Address: Brunswick Street; Vancouver, British Columbia, Canada
- Location in Vancouver
- Coordinates: 49.2640118°N 123.095931°W

Dude Chilling Park is an artwork created by the Canadian artist Viktor Briestensky, which now has official public art status in Vancouver, British Columbia, Canada. It is located on the southwest corner of Guelph Park at the 2300 block of Brunswick Street in the Mount Pleasant area of the city. It references the park's sculpture "Reclining Figure".

== History ==
In November 2012, the sign was created by then Vancouver-based artist Viktor Briestensky, as a light-hearted reference to "Reclining Figure", a public art piece by Michael Dennis installed in Guelph Park in 1991. Inspired by Dennis's sculpture, local visitors to the park, including Briestensky, had taken to referring to it, in the generational vernacular, as "Dude Chilling Park". Part of the artwork's meaning therefore has to do with how the identities of urban places are shaped by their users.Vancouver Park Board staff quickly removed the sign, but local resident Dustin Bromley launched an online petition to reinstall the sign. After more than 1,800 signatures of support, the Parks Board decided to reinstall the sign permanently on February 27, 2014, because it celebrates the unique characteristics of the park and the neighbouring community. In September 2014, the installation was stolen but has since been replaced.

In July 2023, Dude Chilling Park was used to collect donations for residents that had been displaced in a fire.

== Popular culture ==
International attention for Dude Chilling Park included American late night talk show host Jimmy Kimmel who said "Between Dude Chilling Park and Mayor Ford, I might have to move to Canada." R&B Brewing, a local brewery, created "Dude Chilling Pale Ale" in their year-round line-up as a tribute.

The Vancouver Park Board donated a "Barge Chilling Beach" sign that was installed at Sunset Beach, where a wayward barge had been grounded following the November 2021 floods. The sign was later painted over with Í7iy̓el̓shn ("ee-ay-ul-shun"), the name of the beach in the Squamish language, in graffiti. The Park Board removed the sign in late January 2022.
