= Gate to the Northwest Passage =

Sculpture by Alan Chung Hung in Vancouver, British Columbia, Canada

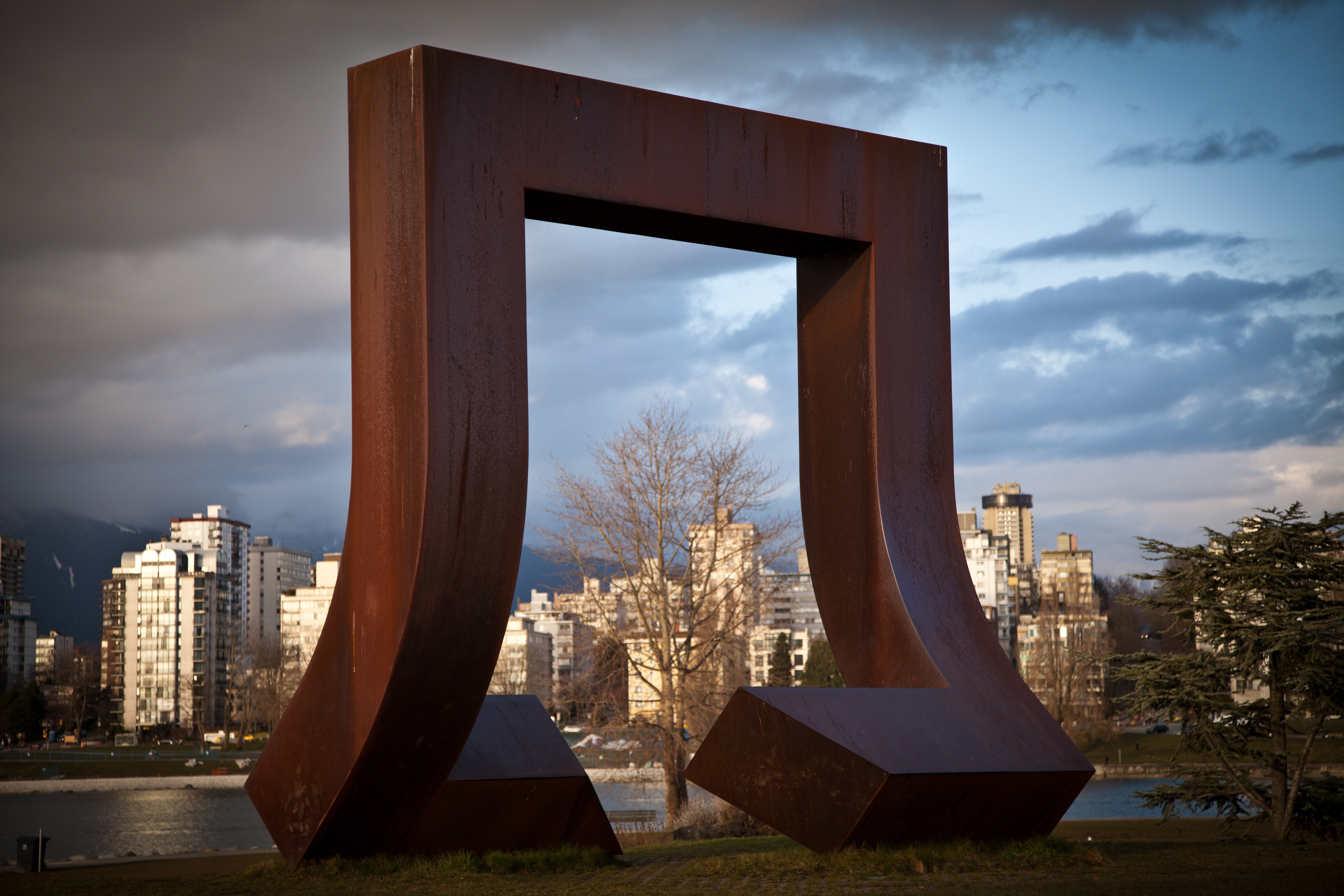
- The sculpture framing Vancouver's skyline in 2011
- Artist: Alan Chung Hung
- Year: 1980
- Type: Sculpture
- Medium: Corten steel
- Dimensions: 4.6 m × 4.6 m (15 ft × 15 ft)
- Location: Vancouver, British Columbia, Canada; 49°16′41″N 123°08′42″W
- Owner: City of Vancouver

Gate to the Northwest Passage is a 1980 sculpture by Alan Chung Hung, located adjacent to the Vancouver Maritime Museum in Vanier Park in the Kitsilano neighborhood of Vancouver, British Columbia, Canada. The 4.6-metre (15 ft) sculpture of a square, cut and twisted "like a paper clip" to form an arch, is composed of weathered Corten steel that rusts to provide a protective layer. The work was installed in 1980 to commemorate the arrival of Captain George Vancouver in Burrard Inlet, following a competition sponsored by Parks Canada one year prior. Gate to the Northwest Passage received an adverse reaction initially, but reception has improved over time. The sculpture has been included in walking tours of the surrounding neighborhoods as a highlight of Vanier Park.

== Background ==
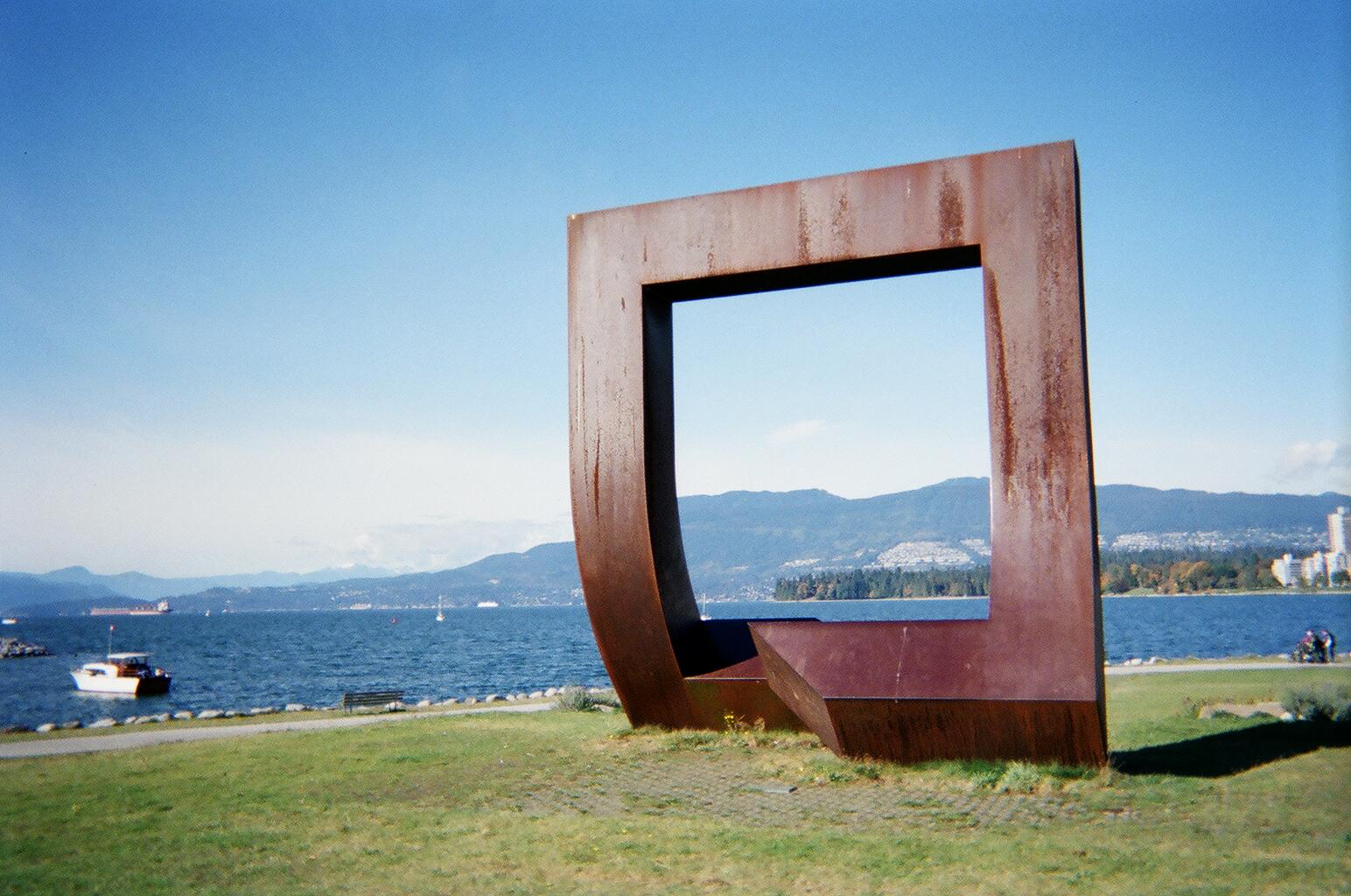
The sculpture in 2007, with English Bay in the background

Gate to the Northwest Passage was designed by Alan Chung Hung (1946–1994), who was born in Canton, China, moved to Vancouver in 1969, and studied at the Vancouver School of Art. Chung Hung's other works displayed in Vancouver include Spring (1981) and Clouds (1991).

In 1979, Parks Canada sponsored a competition for a permanent work to commemorate Captain George Vancouver, the first European to enter Burrard Inlet, in 1792. Guidelines for the competition required the use of permanent materials other than wood and that the work should "not be in the likeness of a man". Hugh Faulkner, Minister of Indian Affairs and Northern Development during 1977–1979, offered the opportunity for the sculpture, and the project was recommended by the Historic Sites and Monuments Board of Canada. Gate to the Northwest Passage was selected by a five-person jury, led by former parks superintendent Stuart Lefeaux, then confirmed by the Parks Board. The work was originally to be installed at Stanley Park's Ferguson Point, but was sited in Vanier Park adjacent to the Vancouver Maritime Museum in 1980.

The 4.6-metre (15 ft) sculpture of a square, cut and twisted "like a paper clip" to form an arch, is composed of weathered Corten steel. Each of the square's sides measure 0.9 metres (3.0 ft) x 0.9 metres (3.0 ft). The Corten steel rusts, forming a protective layer at the surface. The work, sited on a plaza of paving stones that measures 7.9 metres (26 ft) x 8.5 metres (28 ft), frames views of English Bay, the North Shore Mountains and the city. In their guide for public art in Vancouver, John Steil and Aileen Stalker suggested two sources for the sculpture's design: Chung Hung's training as a civil engineer, and the shapes of plane tables and quadrants, both navigational instruments used by George Vancouver. According to Chung Hung: "The objective of the sculpture is to create a symbolic image with definite visual expression, awakening an awareness in Captain George Vancouver's contribution to the world, his remarkable and meticulous surveys which included the north Pacific coast." The sculpture is owned by the City of Vancouver, with Parks Canada serving as the sponsoring organization.

== Reception ==
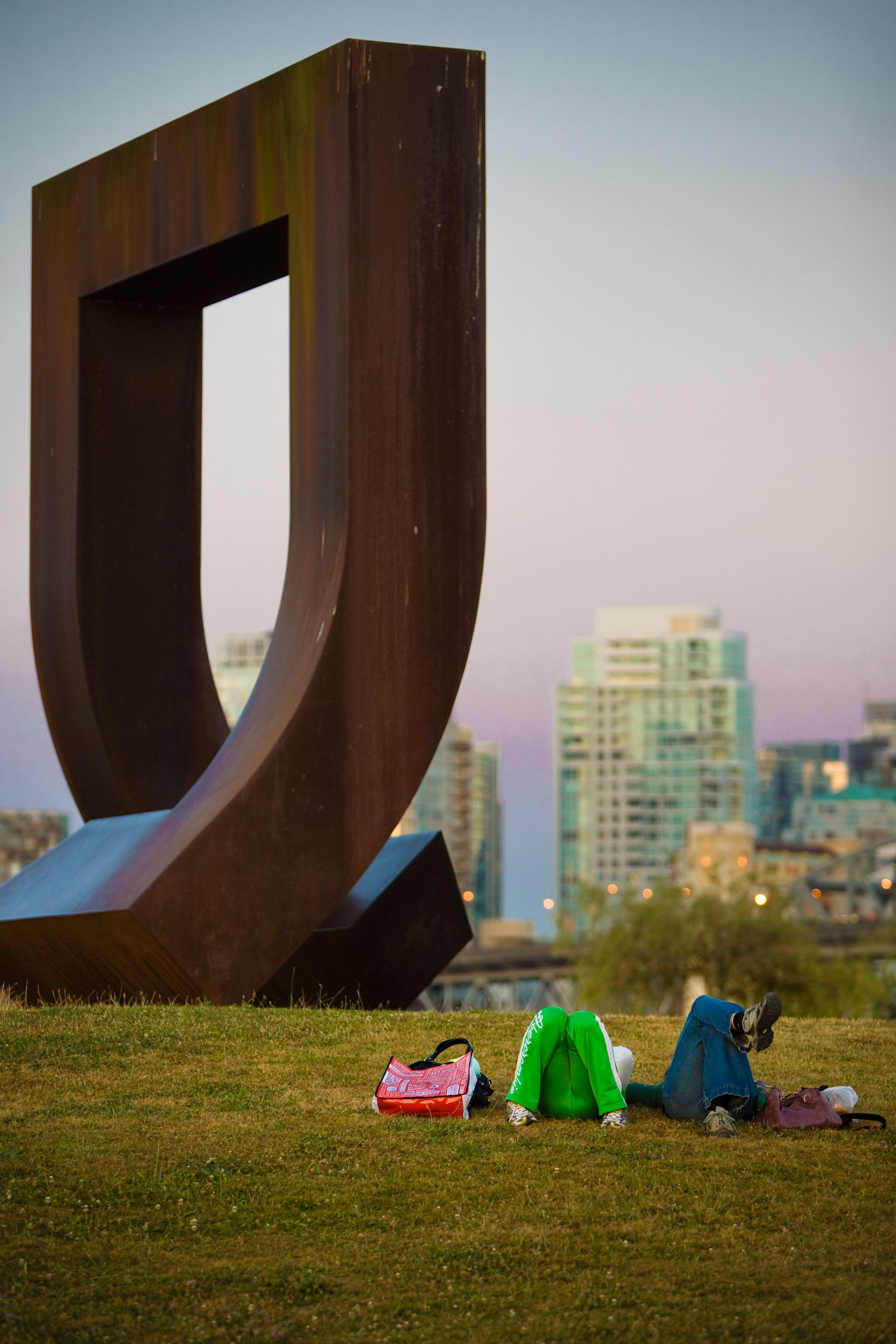
The sculpture in 2008

According to the City of Vancouver Public Art Registry, the sculpture initially received an adverse reaction from local residents. Michael Duncan, then chief curator of the Vancouver Maritime Museum, called it "a bloody monstrosity". One member of the five-person jury responded to the criticism: "If people think Hung's sculpture is a poor catch, they should have seen the ones that got away."

A 1983 article published in The Globe and Mail referred to the sculpture as the "world's largest paper clip". The same article included a statement from the city planning study: "Vancouver's peerless natural setting is a permanent gift from nature. So massive and close are the North Shore mountains that no amount of human folly can ever obliterate them."

Reception of the work, which has become a familiar landmark, has improved over time. One travel guide by Eyewitness Books referred to Gate to the Northwest Passage as an "imposing giant red steel" sculpture. Frommer's includes the sculpture in walking tours for Vancouver as a highlight of Vanier Park.

In 2006, the work was mentioned in a Sunday serial thriller for The Province by author Daniel Kalla. In the series, the sculpture is described as a "massive Greek letter pi", and later a character is found dead, hanging from the sculpture.

== See also ==
- 1980 in art
- Canadian art
- Northwest Passage
