= Knight Street Bridge =

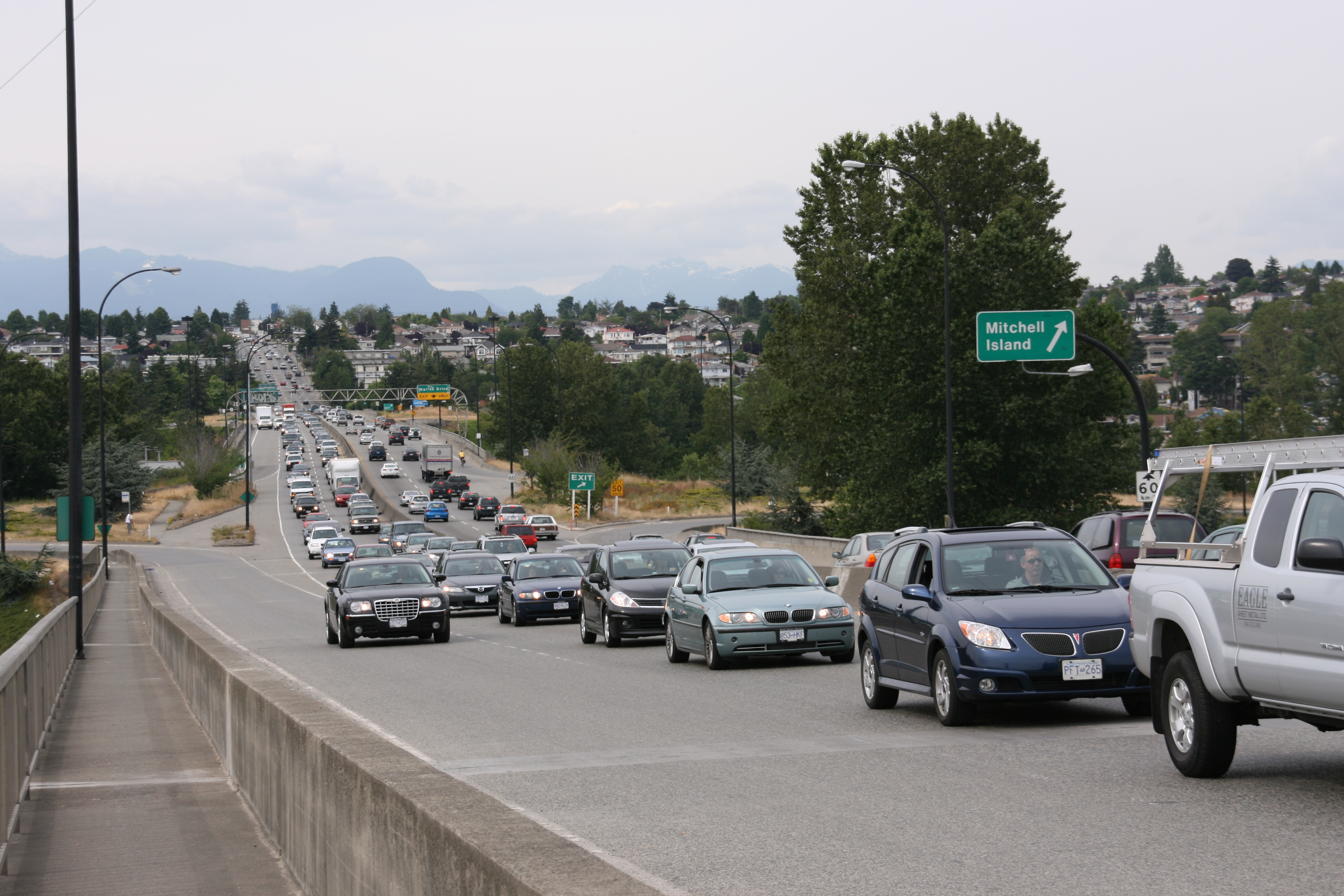
- Coordinates: 49°12′15″N 123°04′39″W
- Carries: 4–6 lanes of Knight Street, and pedestrians/bicycles
- Crosses: North Arm Fraser River
- Locale: Richmond; Vancouver
- Owner: TransLink
- Preceded by: Fraser Street Bridge

Characteristics
- Design: girder bridge
- Total length: 1436 m

History
- Construction start: 1969
- Opened: January 15, 1974

Location
- Interactive map of Knight Street Bridge

The Knight Street Bridge is a crossing over the north arm of the Fraser River, the Canadian National Railway (CNR) line, and several roads, in Metro Vancouver.

== History ==
=== Infrastructure ===
The 1929 Vancouver Major Streets Plan designated the Clark-Knight corridor as a six-lane arterial road. The upgrade delayed for decades, Knight St. was never a streetcar route, and experienced less commercial and lower intensity development than nearby arterials. A late 1950s metropolitan highway planning committee recommendation included a proposed 1970s crossing in the vicinity, to relieve the Oak Street Bridge.

Constructed 1969–1974, the structure was the second cast-in-place segmental cantilever bridge built in North America, the first being Quebec in 1964. For many years, the 109.7-metre (360 ft) main span held the world record for this design. Each drop-in span, which joins the two separate parallel cantilever spans from the main piers, is an arched post-tensioned concrete girder, resting on rubber bearings at each end. Like Knight Street, the bridge was named after Robert Knight, a property owner in South Vancouver in the late 19th and early 20th centuries.

During the planning stage, the project was known as the Fraser Street Bridge Replacement. At the official opening ceremony in January 1974, Graham Lea, provincial Minister of Highways, cut the ribbon. On hand were Gil Blair, mayor of Richmond, and Art Phillips, mayor of Vancouver. Totalling about $15M, including $3M for roadways, the province funded the scheme. On formation in 1999, TransLink assumed ownership and maintenance responsibilities.

The configuration comprises an overpass of Marine Drive, the 238-metre (781 ft) Knight Street Bridge North, and the 1,198-metre (3,930 ft) Knight Street Bridge South. The six-lane medium-level bridge reduces to four lanes over Mitchell Island, the outside lanes becoming the off and on ramps for the island. The electrically heated deck minimizes winter de-icing. On the underside of the deck, the western spans carry a maintenance walkway, above which are a water pipe, gas pipe, and electrical lines. The navigational clearance is 19–23 metres (62–75 ft) at the apex, depending upon the tide.

Upgrading Knight St., and eliminating the load weight restrictions associated with the previous structure, this Vancouver–Richmond link eased congestion, and connected to Highway 99, and since 1989, Highway 91. Averaging over 100,000 vehicle crossings daily, the bridge is the second busiest in the Lower Mainland. Cyclists are legally required to ride on the sidewalks.

=== Maintenance, upgrades and incidents ===
On January 15, 2000 the boom of a mobile crane transported on a barge named T.L. Sharpe, towed by the Sea Cap XII, struck the underside of the Knight Street Bridge at 1:45 PM, damaging the bridge and the fixtures secured underneath its deck. The impact caused the boom to bend and the crane to slide off the barge and sink, and the bridge was closed to traffic for about 48 hours. Water supply to Mitchell Island via the bridge was shut down for 25 days, and an emergency bypass water supply from Vancouver was installed. The incident prompted the City of Richmond to install a second water main to Mitchell Island in 2002.

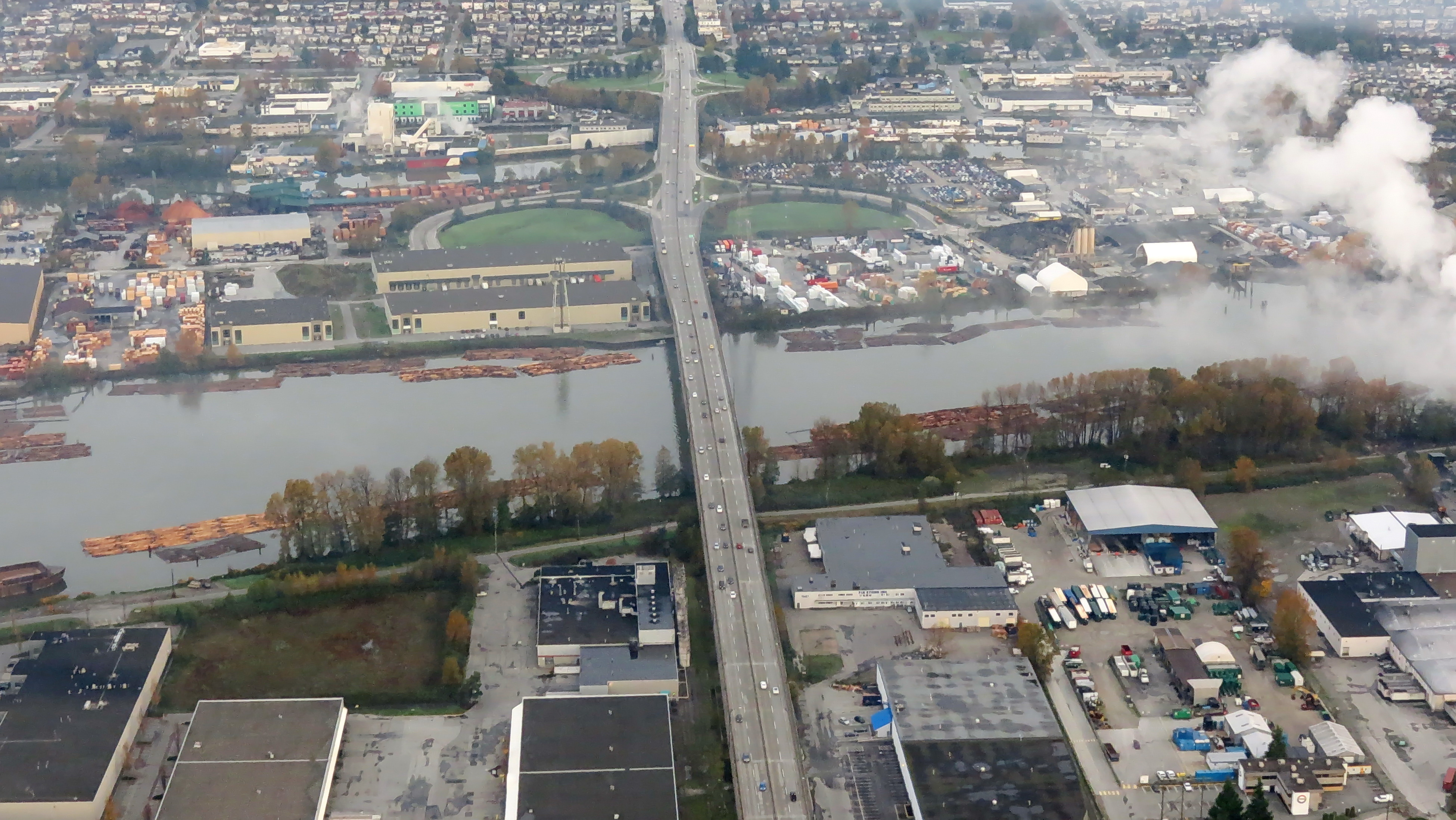
Knight Street Bridge, northward. Richmond in foreground

In 2011, the bridge underwent a seismic retrofit of three abutments, which were vulnerable to settlement or collapse from movements during soil liquefaction. The subsurface conditions comprise dense till-like soils for the north bridge, but potentially liquefiable deltaic sediments for the south bridge. The north abutments and piers rest upon spread footings, whereas the south ones rest upon timber and steel-pipe piles. To densify the ground, 105 injection boreholes were drilled to a depth of 12.3 metres (40 ft) around one abutment, and filled at pressure with a low mobility grout up to the surface. Timber compaction piles were used for densification in other areas. Steel-pipe piles were installed at a pier adjacent to the riverbank.

Ranking first in Vancouver, the bridge was the scene of more than 2,500 car accidents during 2013–2017, of which nearly half resulted in injuries or fatalities. The Marine Dr. on and off ramps have rated among Canada's most dangerous intersections. In 2017, the city made design and signalling changes to enhance safety, which included a new turn bay for westbound vehicles on SE Marine Dr. turning north, and a new shared walking and cycling path.

During early 2020, the bridge underwent extensive rehabilitation that required overnight single lane closures in each direction. The work included lighting upgrades, pier repairs, and the replacement of crash cushions, signage, and bearing and expansion joints. Rehabilitation works also took place in 2023, including bearing replacements, milling and repaving the top layer of concrete deck with polyester polymer concrete (PPC) overlay to prevent future corrosion, pier patch repair expansion joint replacement and railing replacement.

=== Land developments ===
Formerly, transport planning had not been coordinated with land use planning. However, the establishment of the Agricultural Land Reserve in 1973 encouraged the development of the Surrey plateau, and reduced encroachment upon the agricultural lowland of Richmond. If land use had been determined by market forces alone, development along the Knight St. extension south of the bridge would have created the largest industrial park in region. The initial zoning proposal was for a broader footprint south to Cambie Rd., but the final version provided the present narrower corridor south to Westminster Hwy.

=== Transit ===
In 2014, improvements to the Mitchell Island interchange included extended loading bays to aid bus manoeuvering, widening passenger walkways, installing over 60 metres (197 ft) of safety barriers, new traffic islands, and new signage.

== See also ==
- List of crossings of the Fraser River
- List of BC bridges
