= Vancouver Aquatic Centre =

Public aquatic sports facility in Vancouver, Canada

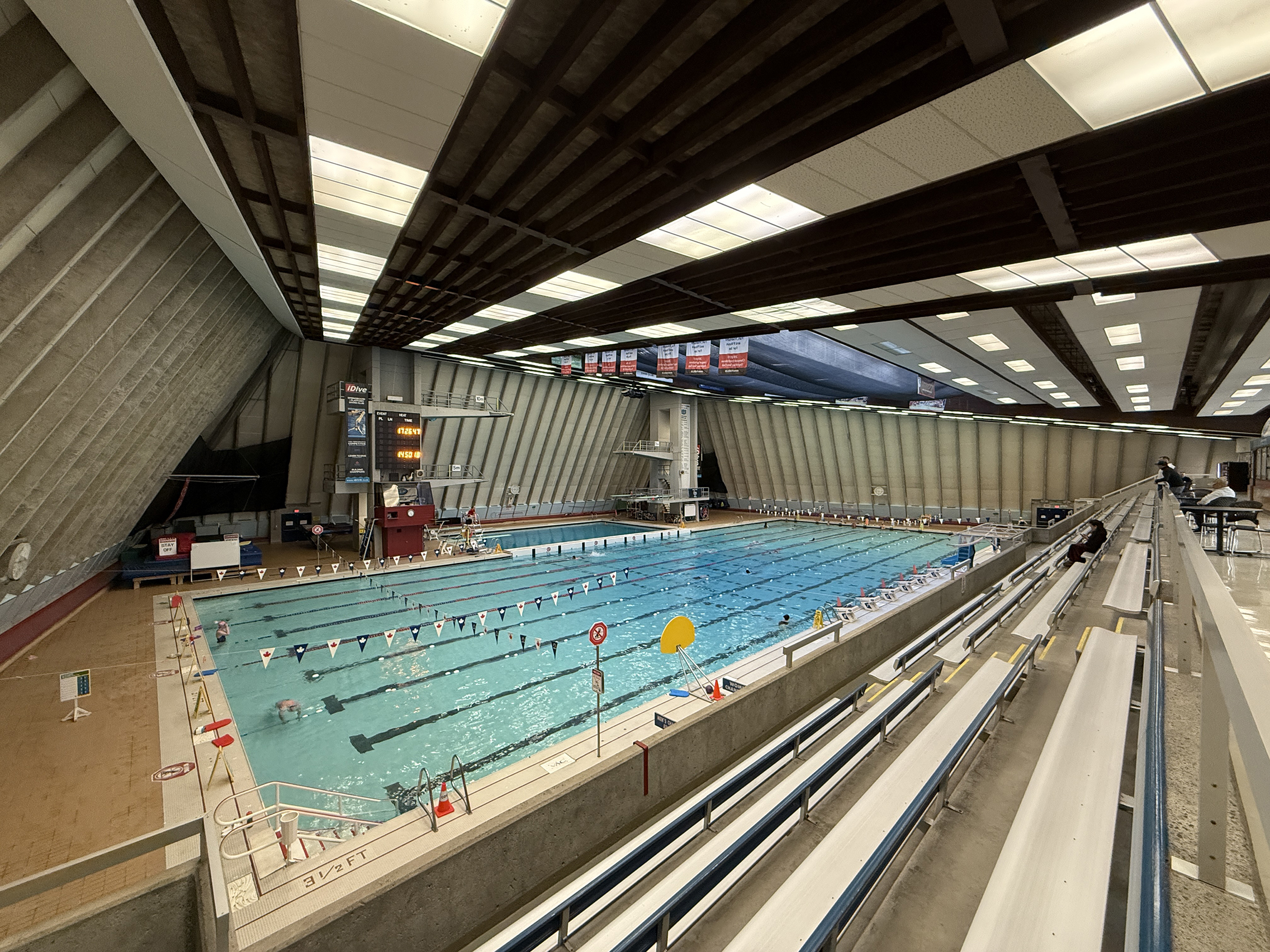
- Interior of The Aquatic Centre in 2026
- Interactive map of Vancouver Aquatic Centre
- Location: Beach Avenue, Vancouver, adjacent to Sunset Beach (Vancouver)
- Coordinates: 49.2769°N 123.1351°W

Construction
- Opened: 1974
- Closed: 2026-06-28

The Vancouver Aquatic Centre was an indoor facility. It replaced the Crystal Pool at Sunset Beach that was opened in 1928 and was demolished in 1974. A contract to renew the facility was let in 2023 and the project is expected to take seven years to complete. The pool was the home of the Canadian Dolphin Swim Club which has contributed to the success of many British Columbia and Canada athletes and coaches.

Due to the Supreme Court of British Columbia interim injunction, the centre permanently closed on 28 June, 2026 after 52 years of operation despite lawsuits from disgruntled locals that attempted to halt the facility’s closure. The aging building will undergo demolition that is scheduled to start in early October 2026 and the facility will be replaced within a few years with a more modern $175 million aquatic centre with a much smaller 25 metre pool and other amenities.

== Crystal Pool ==
Crystal Pool at Sunset Beach, demolished in 1974 and replaced by the aquatic centre, was originally a saltwater pool built as part of a private club, the Connaught Beach Club. Because of racial segregation at the pool from its beginning in 1928 until 1945, which allowed oriental and brown-skinned people to swim at the pool only one day a week, the nearby Indian Reserve beach at False Creek became informally known as "Brown Skin Beach".
