= Victoria Foe =

American biologist

- Born: 1945 (age 80–81)

Academic background
- Education: University of Texas at Austin
- Alma mater: University of Washington
- Thesis: Activation of transcriptional units during the embryogenesis of Oncopeltus fasciatus (1975)

Academic work
- Discipline: Biology
- Sub-discipline: Developmental biology
- Institutions: University of Washington Center for Cell Dynamics
- Main interests: Drosophila

Victoria Elizabeth Foe (born 1945) is an American developmental biologist, and Research Professor at the University of Washington's Center for Cell Dynamics. She is known for her work on the development of embryos.

== Early life and education ==
As a child, Foe moved around a lot, living in the United States, Mexico, and England. Foe has a B.S. from the University of Texas at Austin (1966). She then earned a Ph.D. from University of Texas at Austin, where she started working with Hugh Forrest and then finished at the University of Washington, where she studied with Charles Laird. Her postdoctoral work was with Bruce Alberts at the University of California in San Francisco.

== Career ==
Foe joined the zoology department at the University of Washington in 1991. Foe is a founding member of the Center of Cell Dynamics at Friday Harbor Laboratories, within the University of Washington. She has not taught or gone down the traditional path of mentoring young scientists, not wanting to get caught up in administrative duties as a professor. Nor has she let technicians or students work for her in research. As of 2021, Foe is professor emeritus at the University of Washington.

== Research ==
Foe works with frogs, mosquitoes, fruit flies, and fish to examine the growth and patterning of embryos. She describes her work as largely observational, but utilizes recent scientific techniques to explore her observations of the natural world. Her work on Drosophila was supported by an independent supporting grant, by the National Institutes of Health. Foe is best known for her research defining how groups of cells in embryos divide at different rates and thereby develop into different body parts. She has also worked on the formation of furrows during development of cells, through both visual observations and modelling research.

== Selected publications ==
- Foe, V.E.; Alberts, B.M. (1 May 1983). "Studies of nuclear and cytoplasmic behaviour during the five mitotic cycles that precede gastrulation in Drosophila embryogenesis". Journal of Cell Science. 61 (1): 31–70. doi:10.1242/jcs.61.1.31. ISSN 0021-9533. PMID 6411748.
- Foe, V.E. (1 September 1989). "Mitotic domains reveal early commitment of cells in Drosophila embryos". Development. 107 (1): 1–22. doi:10.1242/dev.107.1.1. ISSN 0950-1991. PMID 2516798.
- Foe, Victoria E.; von Dassow, George (27 October 2008). "Stable and dynamic microtubules coordinately shape the myosin activation zone during cytokinetic furrow formation". Journal of Cell Biology. 183 (3): 457–470. doi:10.1083/jcb.200807128. ISSN 0021-9525. PMC 2575787. PMID 18955555.
- Foe, Victoria E.; Wilkinson, Linda E.; Laird, Charles D. (1 September 1976). "Comparative organization of active transcription units in Oncopeltus fasciatus". Cell. 9 (1): 131–146. doi:10.1016/0092-8674(76)90059-3. ISSN 0092-8674. PMID 975237. S2CID 46017400.

== Awards ==
In 1990, Foe was named a Guggenheim fellow. In 1993, at the age of 34, Foe won a McArthur Genius Grant for her work in cell and developmental biology.

== Activism ==
Foe is an activist and scientist. She was involved in the women's movement, the anti-Vietnam War movement, and the anti-Persian Gulf War movement. As a student at the University of Texas in 1968, she worked to connect students with doctors willing to prescribe contraceptives to students and to perform abortions. She took a break from her schooling at the University of Texas at Austin to take a position as political aide. While acting as a political aid, she helped overturn the anti-abortion legislation in the state of Texas.

== Personal life ==
She was married Michael Dennis, a neurophysiologist. They later divorced.
