= East Van Cross =

Public artwork in Vancouver, British Columbia, Canada

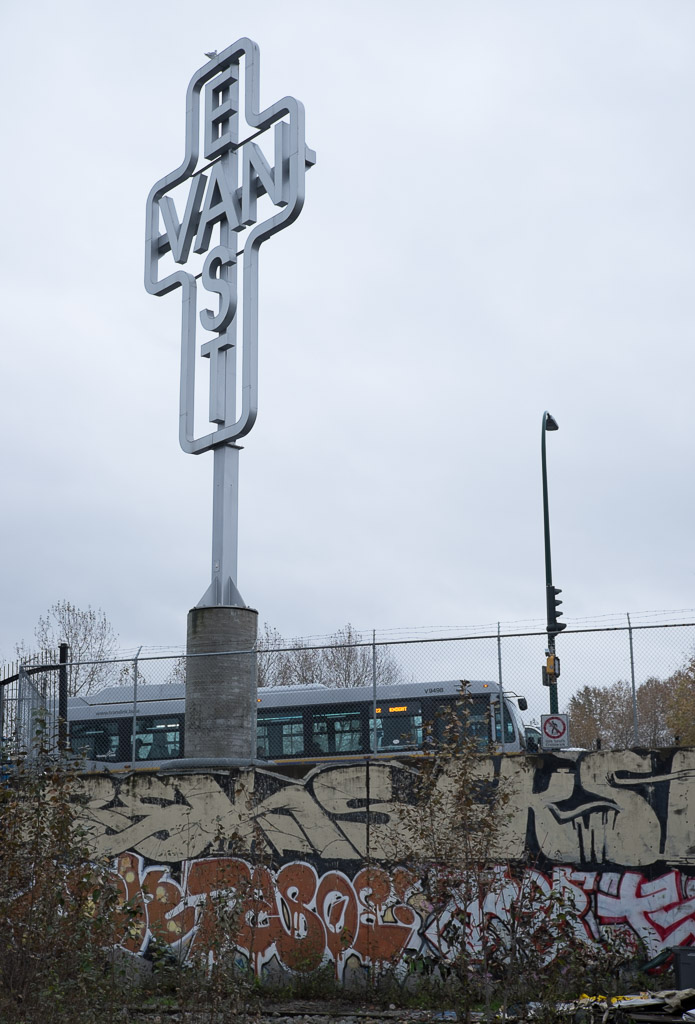
The Monument for East Vancouver, photographed in November 2014

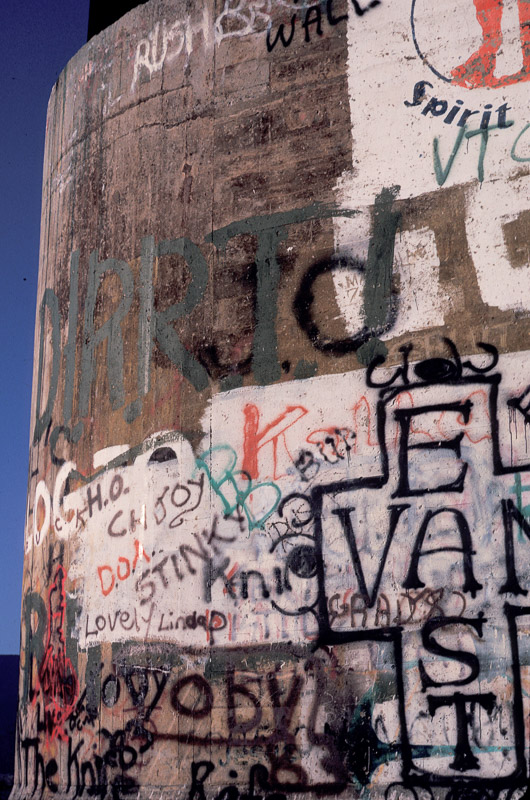
This graffiti was photographed in September 1983 on one of the WWII-vintage pillboxes on Vancouver's Point Grey Foreshore.

The East Van Cross is a symbol formed by the words East written vertically and Van written horizontally in capital letters, intersecting at the shared letter A, and forming the shape of a cross. Van is short for Vancouver, and the reference is to the city's Eastern half, traditionally less wealthy and harder-edged.

The East Van Cross traditionally was the work of graffiti artists, said to express the "marginality and defiance" of East Vancouver.

Starting in the 21st century, the symbol has been adopted as a city icon, most visibly expressed in the form of Monument for East Vancouver by artist Ken Lum, erected in 2010 near the intersection of Clark Drive and East 6th Avenue. It has become possible to purchase clothing and jewellery bearing the East Van Cross motif.

The symbol is alluded to in the packaging of the Parallel 49 Brewing Company craft lager.

The Cross features prominently on the right side of Vancouver Canucks' goaltender Thatcher Demko's goalie mask, which he unveiled on December 22, 2024.
