= Mitchell Island =

Island in the North Arm of the Fraser River in British Columbia, Canada

Coordinates: 49°12′09″N 123°05′31″W

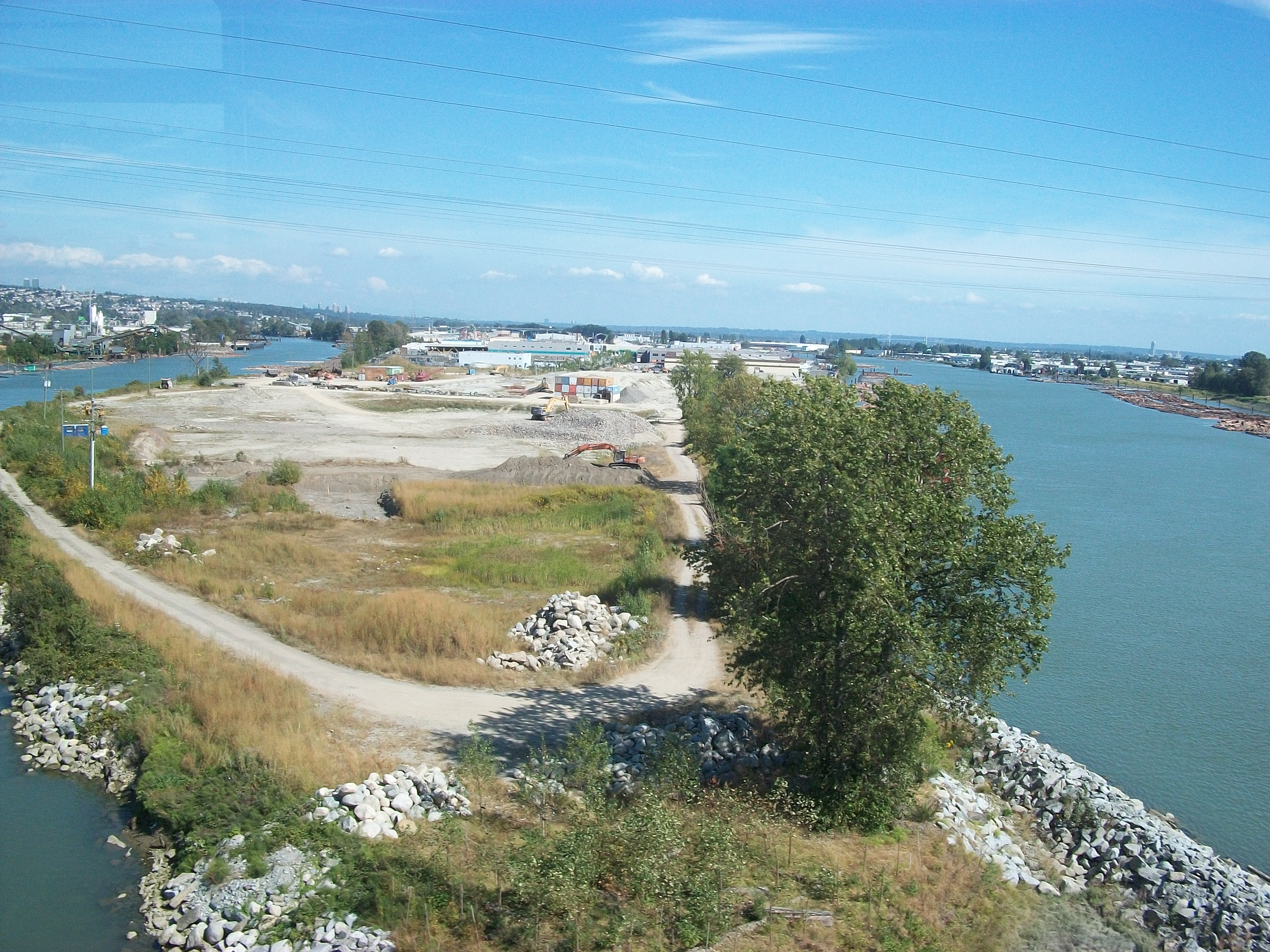
Looking east over Mitchell Island, as seen from the North Arm Bridge on the Canada Line (part of Greater Vancouver's SkyTrain system). Knight Street Bridge visible in distant background.

Mitchell Island is an island in the North Arm of the Fraser River in British Columbia, Canada, located between the cities of Vancouver and Richmond (incorporated as part of the latter). It is crossed by (and has on- and off-ramps for) the Knight Street Bridge, which is one of the main bridges between the City of Vancouver and Richmond.

Originally agricultural, its land is now mainly used for industrial purposes. The island is host to a number of auto wreckers. Mitchell Island now includes the area of Twigg Island, originally known as Mason's Island and also known as Bell Island, a name which was rescinded in 1951 after the channel separating it from Mitchell Island was filled in. Also incorporated into Mitchell Island after the intervening channel was Eburne Island. The island's name commemorates the original Crown Grantee, Alexander Mitchell.

The only way to get on and off the island by road or walking is through on- and off-ramps near the middle of the Knight Street Bridge. There is also a bus stop near the exit and entrance from the bridge; however, buses do not travel on the island itself.

== See also ==
- Sea Island, British Columbia
- Iona Island (British Columbia)
