= Vancouver =

City in British Columbia, Canada

- City
- City of Vancouver
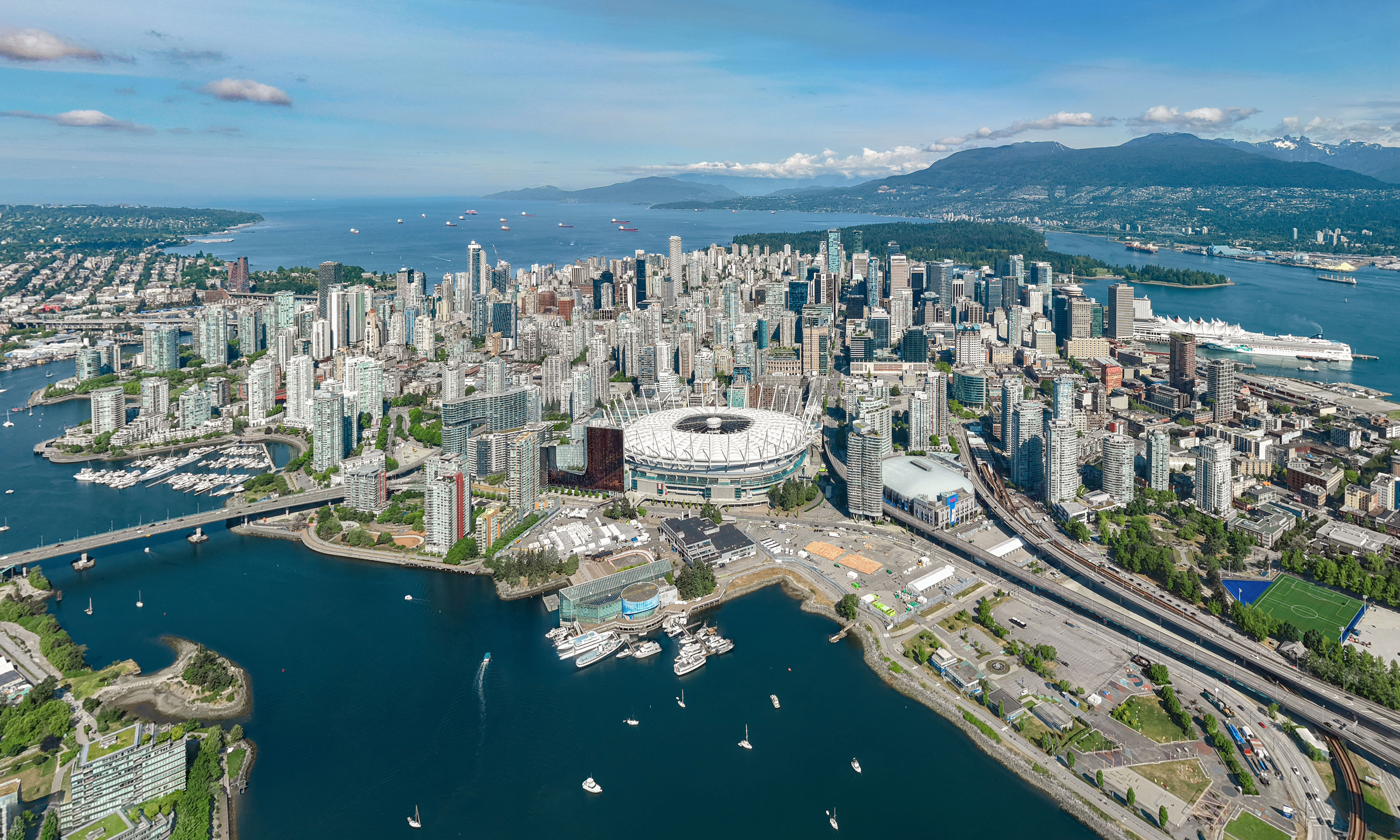
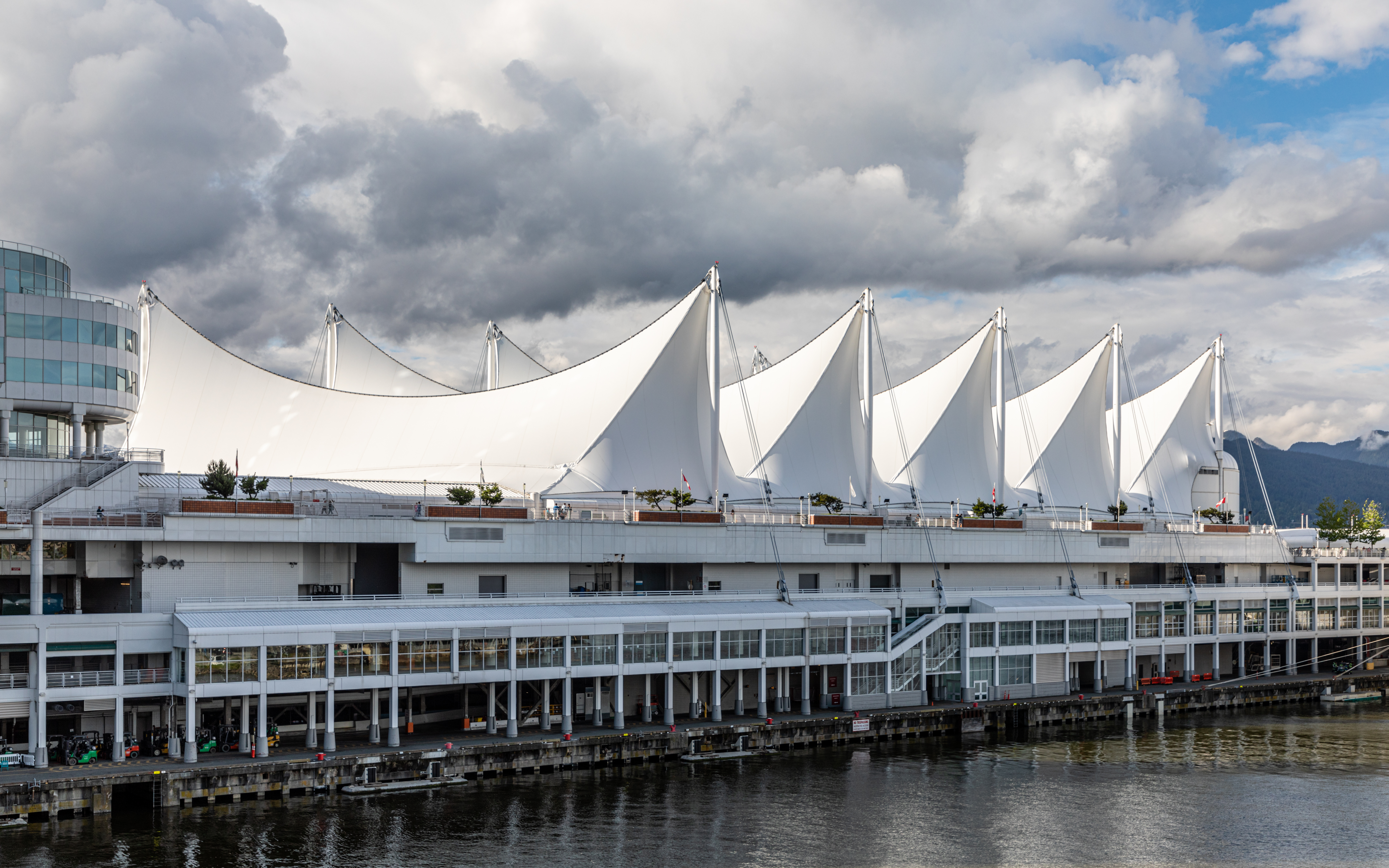
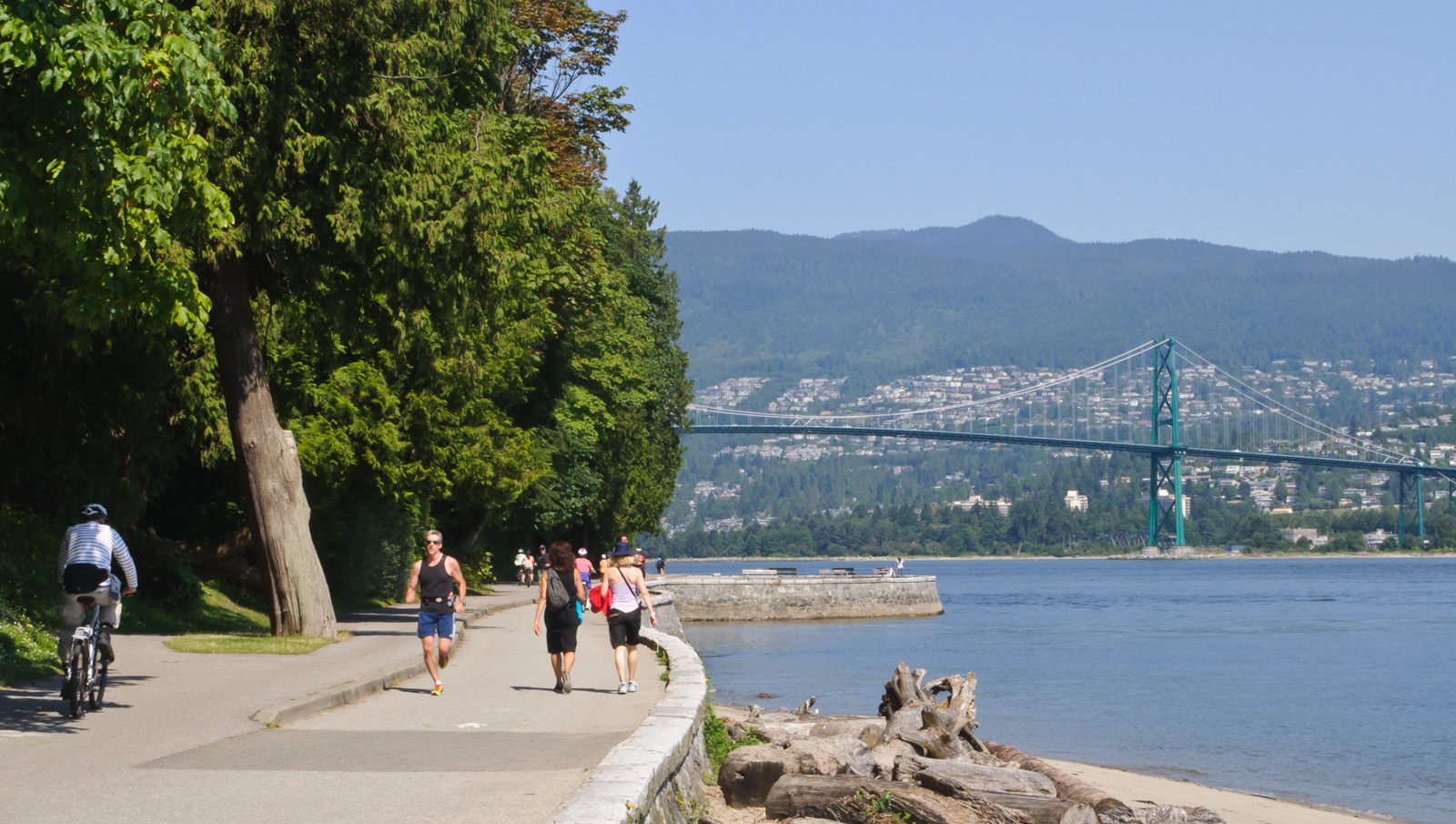
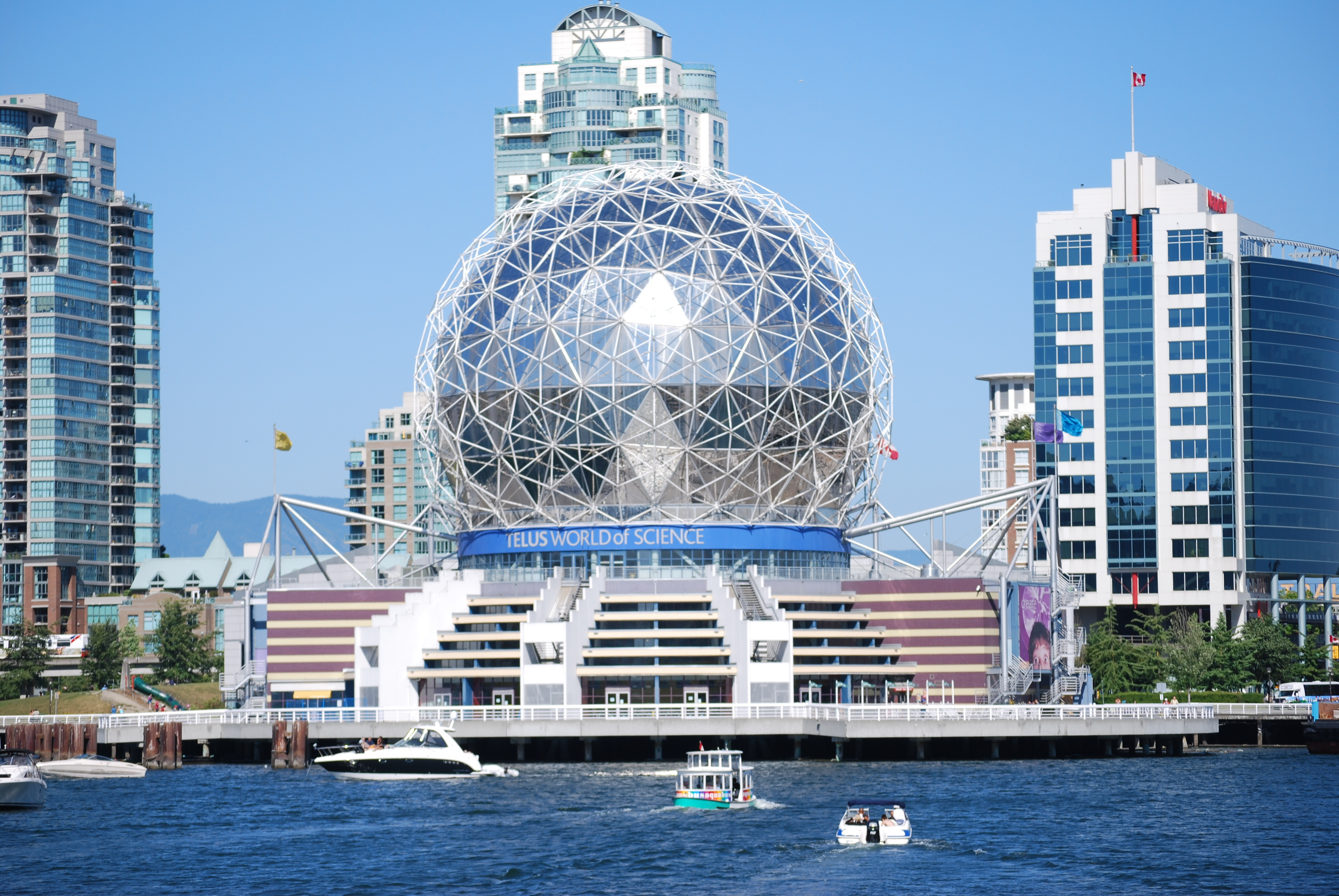
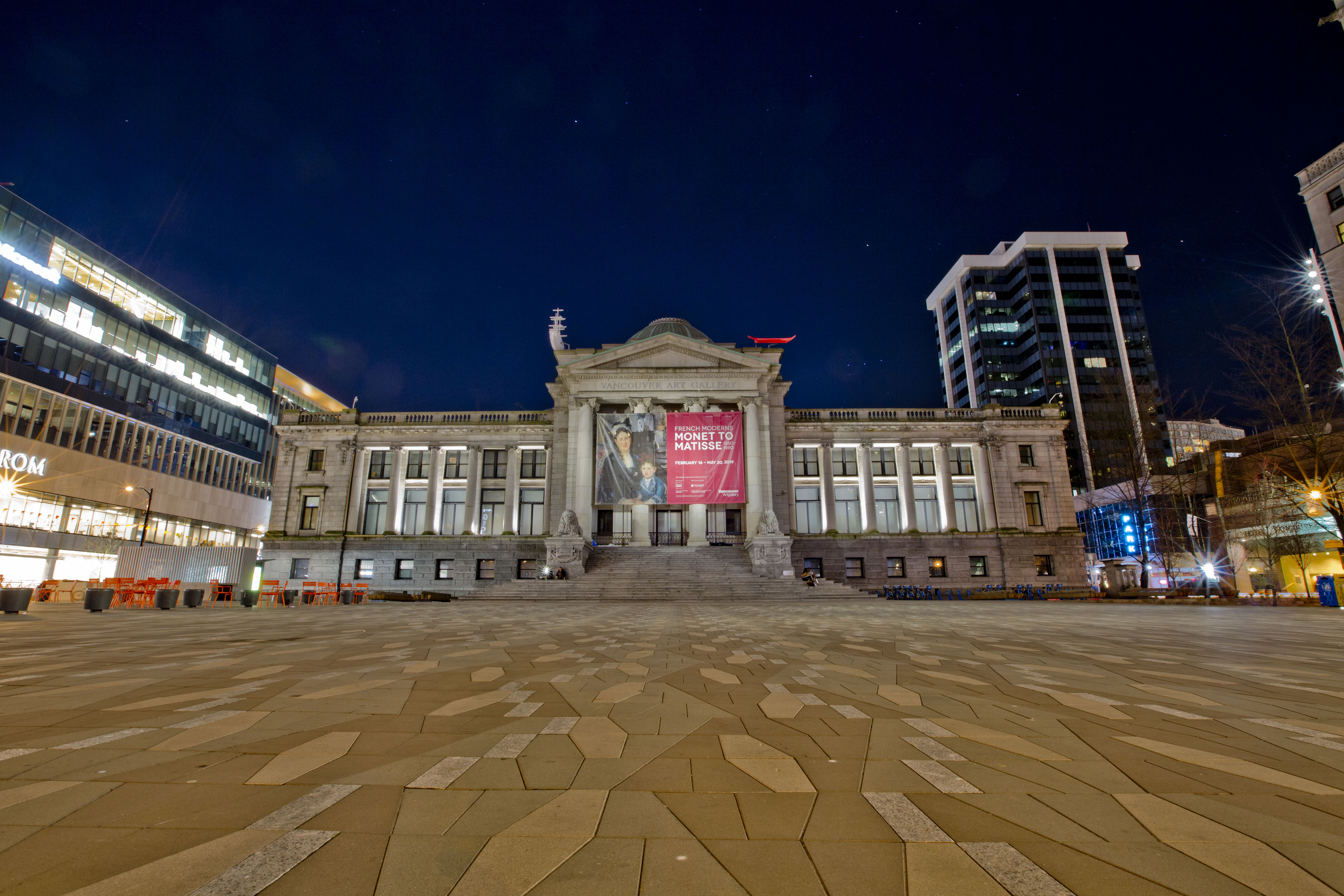
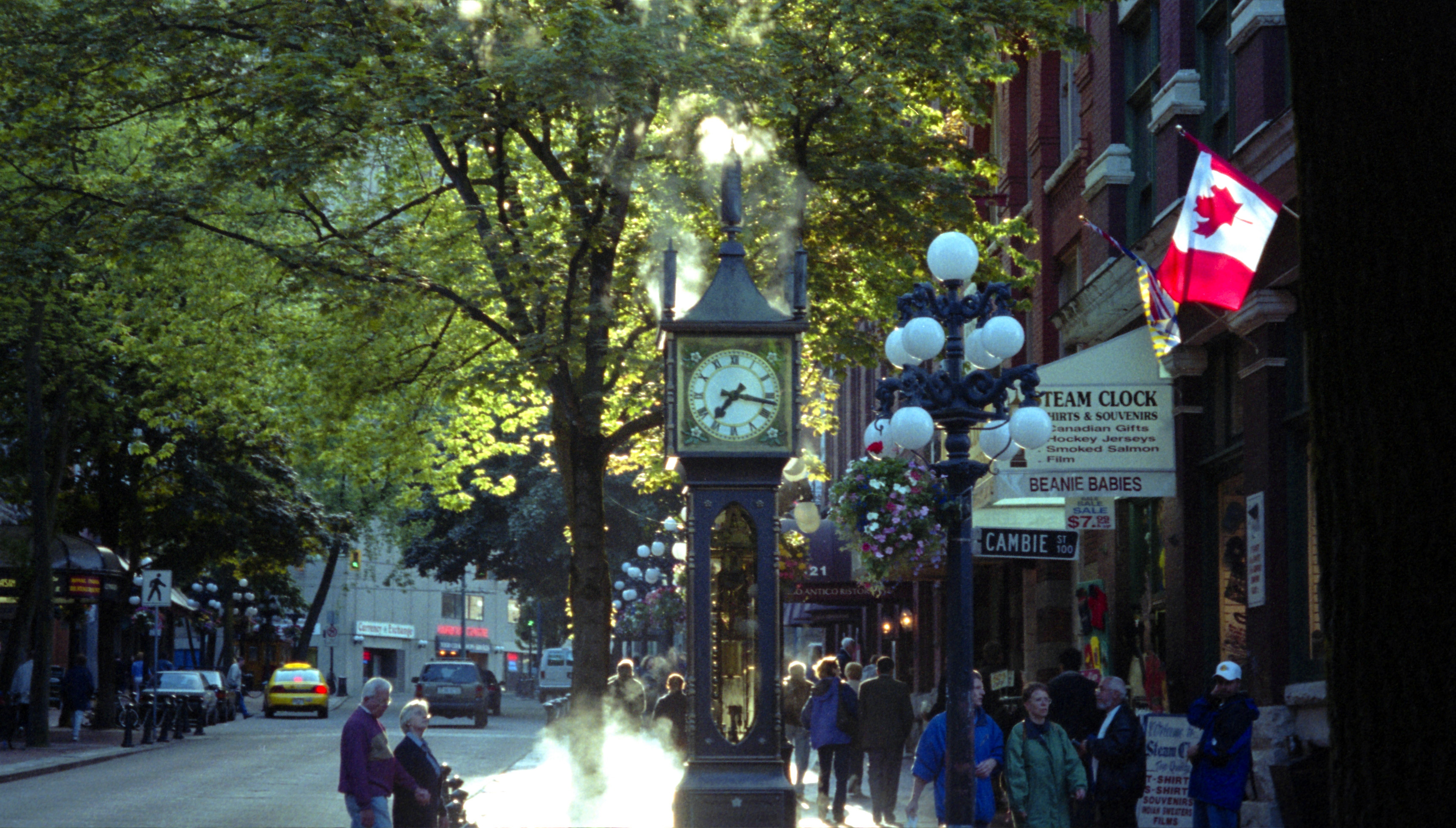
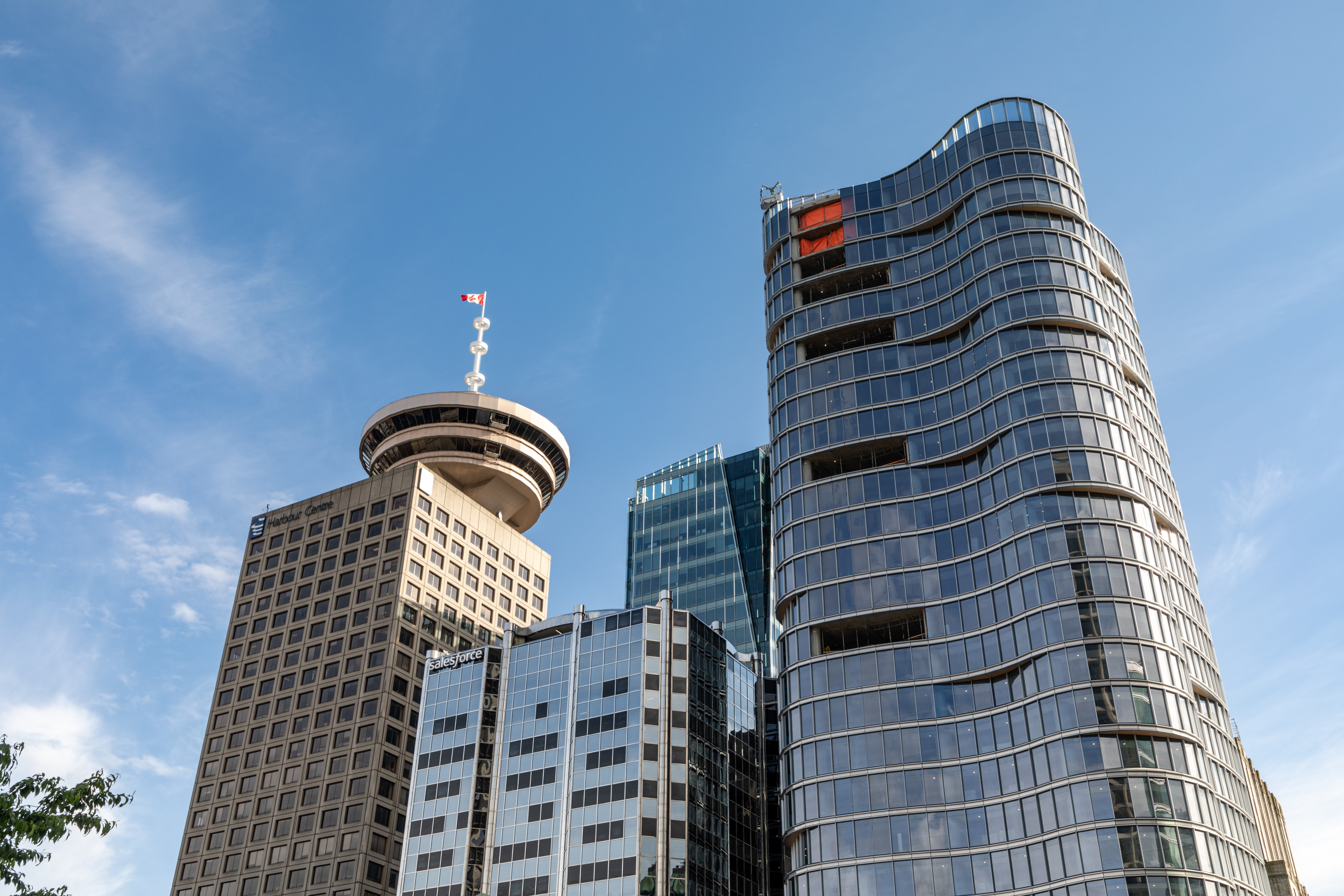
- Downtown Vancouver skyline Canada Place Stanley Park and Lions Gate Bridge Science World Vancouver Art Gallery Gastown Harbour Centre

- Flag Coat of arms Logo
- Nickname: See nicknames of Vancouver
- Motto: "By sea land and air we prosper"
- Location of Vancouver in Metro Vancouver
- Interactive map of Vancouver
- Location within British Columbia
- Coordinates: 49°15′39″N 123°06′50″W
- Country: Canada
- Province: British Columbia
- Regional district: Metro Vancouver
- Established: March 10, 1870 (as Granville)
- Incorporated: April 6, 1886 (as Vancouver)
- Amalgamated: January 1, 1929
- Named for: George Vancouver
- Seat: Vancouver City Hall

Government
  - Type: Mayor-council government
  - Body: Vancouver City Council (11 members)
  - Mayor: Pete Fry (Green Party of Vancouver)

Area
  - City: 123.63 km^{2} (47.73 sq mi)
  - Land: 115.18 km^{2} (44.47 sq mi)
  - Urban: 911.64 km^{2} (351.99 sq mi)
  - Metro: 2,878.93 km^{2} (1,111.56 sq mi)
- Highest elevation (Little Mountain): 152 m (499 ft)
- Lowest elevation: 0 m (0 ft)

Population (2021)
  - City: 662,248
  - Rank: 8th in Canada
  - Density: 5,749.9/km^{2} (14,892/sq mi)
  - Rank: 1st
  - Metro: 2,642,825 (3rd in Canada)
  - Metro density: 918/km^{2} (2,380/sq mi)
  - Region: 3,049,496
- Demonym: Vancouverite

GDP (nominal, 2021)
  - Metro: CA$183.14 billion (US$146.51 billion)
  - Per capita: CA$66,081 (US$52,864.8)
- Time zone: UTC−07:00 (PCT)
- Forward sortation area: V5K – V6T, V6Z, V7X – V7Y
- Area codes: 604, 778, 236, 672
- NTS map: 92G3 Lulu Island, 92G6 North Vancouver
- GNBC code: JBRIK
- Website: vancouver.ca

Vancouver (Note: /væn.ˈkuː.vər/, van-KOO-vər) is a major city in Western Canada, located in the Lower Mainland region of British Columbia. As the most populous city in the province, the 2021 Canadian census recorded 662,248 people in the city, up from 631,486 in 2016. The Greater Vancouver area had a population of 2.6 million in 2021, making it the third-largest metropolitan area in Canada after Toronto and Montreal. The region, together with the Fraser Valley, makes up the Lower Mainland, which has a total population of over 3 million. Vancouver has the highest population density in Canada, with over 5,700 inhabitants per square kilometre (15,000/sq mi), and the fourth highest in North America (after New York City, San Francisco, and Mexico City).

Vancouver is one of the most ethnically and linguistically diverse cities in Canada: 49.3 percent of its residents are not native English speakers, 47.8 percent are native speakers of neither English nor French, and 54.5 percent of residents belong to visible minority groups. It has been consistently ranked one of the most liveable cities in Canada and in the world. In terms of housing affordability, Vancouver is also one of the most expensive cities in Canada and in the world. Vancouverism is the city's urban planning design philosophy.

Indigenous settlement of Vancouver began more than 10,000 years ago and included the Squamish, Musqueam, and Tsleil-Waututh (Burrard) peoples. The beginnings of the modern city, which was originally named Gastown, grew around the site of a makeshift tavern on the western edges of Hastings Mill that was built on July 1, 1867, and owned by proprietor Gassy Jack. The Gastown steam clock marks the original site. Gastown then formally registered as a townsite named Granville, Burrard Inlet. The city was renamed "Vancouver" in 1886 through a deal with the Canadian Pacific Railway. The Canadian Pacific transcontinental railway was extended to the city by 1887. The city's large natural seaport on the Pacific Ocean became a vital link in the trade between Asia-Pacific, East Asia, Europe, and Eastern Canada.

Vancouver has hosted many international conferences and events, including the 1954 Commonwealth Games, UN Habitat I, Expo 86, APEC Canada 1997, the World Police and Fire Games in 1989 and 2009, matches and the finals of the 2015 FIFA Women's World Cup, several matches of the 2026 FIFA World Cup, and the 2010 Winter Olympics and Paralympics which were held in Vancouver and Whistler, a resort community 125 km (78 mi) north of the city. In 1969, Greenpeace was founded in Vancouver. The city became the permanent home of TED conferences in 2014.

As of 2016, the Port of Vancouver is the fourth-largest port by tonnage in the Americas, the busiest and largest port in Canada, and the most diversified port in North America. While forestry remains its largest industry, Vancouver is well known as an urban centre surrounded by nature, making tourism its second-largest industry. Major film production studios in Vancouver and nearby Burnaby have turned Greater Vancouver and nearby areas into one of the largest film production centres in North America, earning it the nickname "Hollywood North".

== Etymology ==
The city takes its name from George Vancouver, who explored the inner harbour of Burrard Inlet in 1792 and gave various places British names. The family name "Vancouver" itself originates from the Dutch "van Coevorden", denoting somebody from the city of Coevorden, Netherlands. The explorer's ancestors came to England "from Coevorden", which is the origin of the name that eventually became "Vancouver".

K'emk'emeláy̓, meaning "place of many maple trees", was the name of a village inhabited by the Squamish people, where a sawmill was established by Edward Stamp, beginning the settlement that became Vancouver. This name is used to represent the city on the Squamish-language road signage along the Sea to Sky Highway. In hən̓q̓əmin̓əm̓ (the Downriver dialect of Halkomelem), spoken by the Musqueam, there is no specific term for Vancouver. (Note: Note Suttles' (2004) p. 412 example of "təl̓ənəcə čxʷ. təlíʔ cən [ʔə] ƛ̓ Vancouver": 'Where are you from? I'm from Vancouver.' and the absence of a hən̓q̓əmin̓əm̓ term for Vancouver.) Rather there existed names for specific villages and landscape features that the people knew intimately in the area in which Vancouver exists currently, as opposed to larger geographic features. The region where Vancouver is currently located was referred to by the Stó꞉lō in the Upriver Halkomelem dialect as Lhq'á:lets, meaning "wide at the bottom/end". Speakers of the Island dialect of Halkomelem referred to the region of Vancouver as sqwx̌wam̓ush or skwóm̓esh, referring to the Squamish, or as Pankúpe7, a transliteration of the English word Vancouver.

== History ==
=== Before 1850 ===
Archaeological records indicate that Aboriginal people were already living in the Vancouver area from 8,000 to 10,000 years ago.

The Squamish, Musqueam, and Tsleil-Waututh (Burrard) peoples of the Coast Salish group had villages in various parts of present-day Vancouver, such as Stanley Park, False Creek, Kitsilano, Point Grey and near the mouth of the Fraser River.

Europeans became acquainted with the area of the future Vancouver when José María Narváez of Spain explored the coast of present-day Point Grey and parts of Burrard Inlet in 1791.

Draft map of villages and landmarks with their Indigenous names, Burrard Inlet and English Bay, by Vancouver archivist J. S. Matthews

The explorer and North West Company trader Simon Fraser and his crew became the first-known Europeans to set foot on the site of the present-day city. In 1808, they travelled from the east down the Fraser River, perhaps as far as Point Grey.

=== Early growth ===
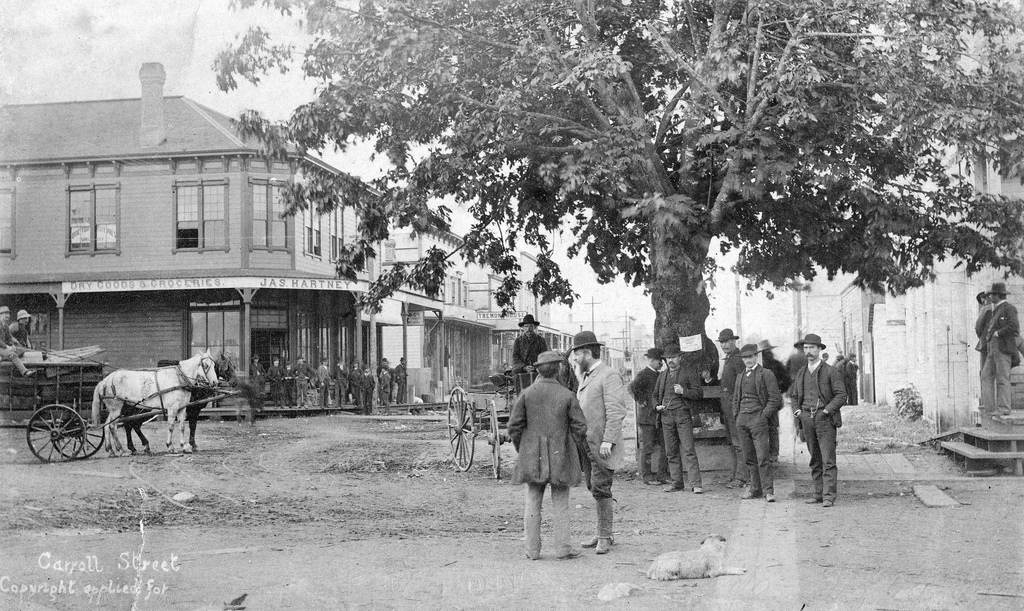
View of Gastown from Carrall and Water Street in 1886. Gastown was a settlement that quickly became a centre for trade and commerce on Burrard Inlet.

The Fraser Gold Rush of 1858 brought over 25,000 men, mainly from California, to nearby New Westminster (founded February 14, 1859) on the Fraser River, on their way to the Fraser Canyon, bypassing what would become Vancouver. Vancouver is among British Columbia's youngest cities; the first European settlement in what is now Vancouver was not until 1862 at McCleery's Farm on the Fraser River, just east of the ancient village of Musqueam in what is now Marpole. A sawmill was established at Moodyville (now the City of North Vancouver) in 1863, beginning the city's long relationship with logging. It was quickly followed by mills owned by Captain Edward Stamp on the south shore of the inlet. Stamp, who had begun logging in the Port Alberni area, first attempted to run a mill at Brockton Point, but difficult currents and reefs forced the relocation of the operation in 1867 to a point near the foot of Dunlevy Street. This mill, known as the Hastings Mill, became the nucleus around which Vancouver formed. The mill's central role in the city waned after the arrival of the Canadian Pacific Railway (CPR) in the 1880s. It nevertheless remained important to the local economy until it closed in the 1920s. The settlement, which came to be called Gastown, proliferated around the original makeshift tavern established by Gassy Jack in 1867 on the edge of the Hastings Mill property.

In 1870, the colonial government surveyed the settlement and laid out a townsite, renamed "Granville" in honour of the then–British Secretary of State for the Colonies, Lord Granville. This site, with its natural harbour, was selected in 1884 as the terminus for the Canadian Pacific Railway, to the disappointment of Port Moody, New Westminster and Victoria, all of which had vied to be the railhead. A railway was among the inducements for British Columbia to join the Confederation in 1871, but the Pacific Scandal and arguments over the use of Chinese labour delayed construction until the 1880s.

=== Incorporation ===
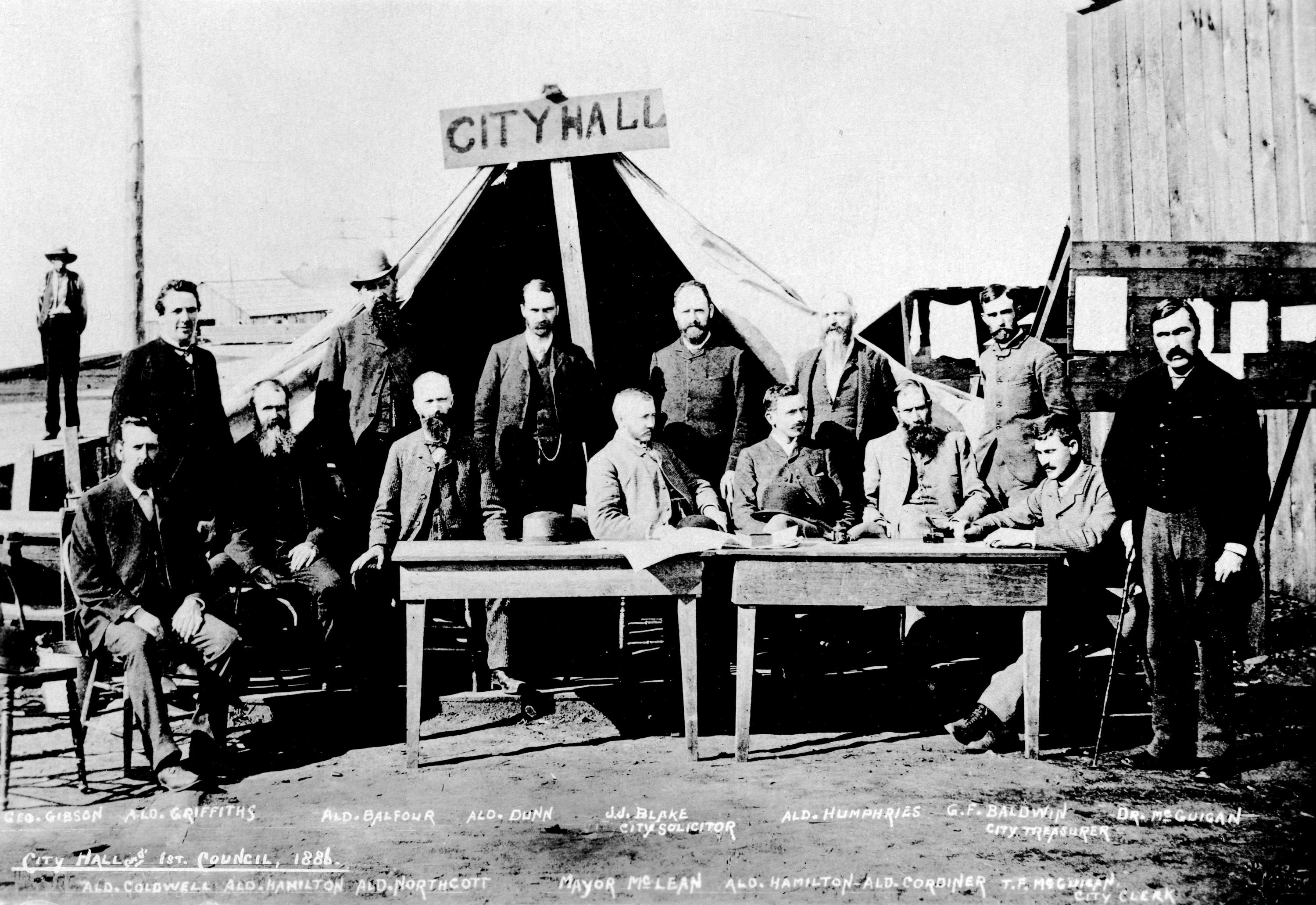
The first Vancouver City Council meeting following the Great Vancouver Fire in 1886

The City of Vancouver was incorporated on April 6, 1886, the same year that the first transcontinental train arrived. CPR president William Van Horne arrived in Port Moody to establish the CPR terminus recommended by Henry John Cambie and gave the city its name in honour of George Vancouver. The Great Vancouver Fire on June 13, 1886, razed the entire city. The Vancouver Fire Department was established that year and the city quickly rebuilt. Vancouver's population grew from a settlement of 1,000 people in 1881 to over 20,000 by the turn of the century and 100,000 by 1911.

Vancouver merchants outfitted prospectors bound for the Klondike Gold Rush in 1898. One of those merchants, Charles Woodward, had opened the first Woodward's store at Abbott and Cordova Streets in 1892 and, along with Spencer's and the Hudson's Bay department stores, formed the core of the city's retail sector for decades.

The economy of early Vancouver was dominated by large companies such as the CPR, which fuelled economic activity and led to the rapid development of the new city; in fact, the CPR was the main real estate owner and housing developer in the city. While some manufacturing did develop, including the establishment of the British Columbia Sugar Refinery by Benjamin Tingley Rogers in 1890, natural resources became the basis for Vancouver's economy. The resource sector was initially based on logging and later on exports moving through the seaport, where commercial traffic constituted the largest economic sector in Vancouver by the 1930s.

=== 20th century ===
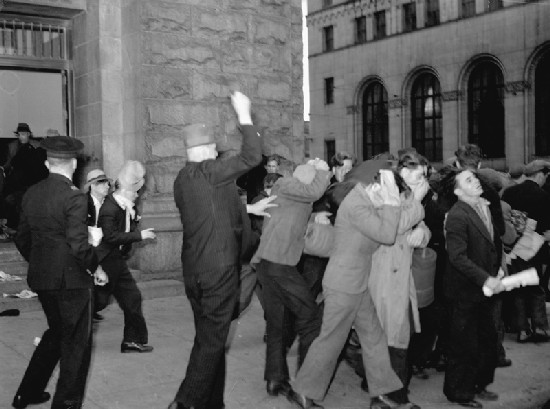
Plainclothes RCMP officers attack Relief Camp Workers' Union protesters in 1938. Several protests over unemployment occurred in the city during the Great Depression.

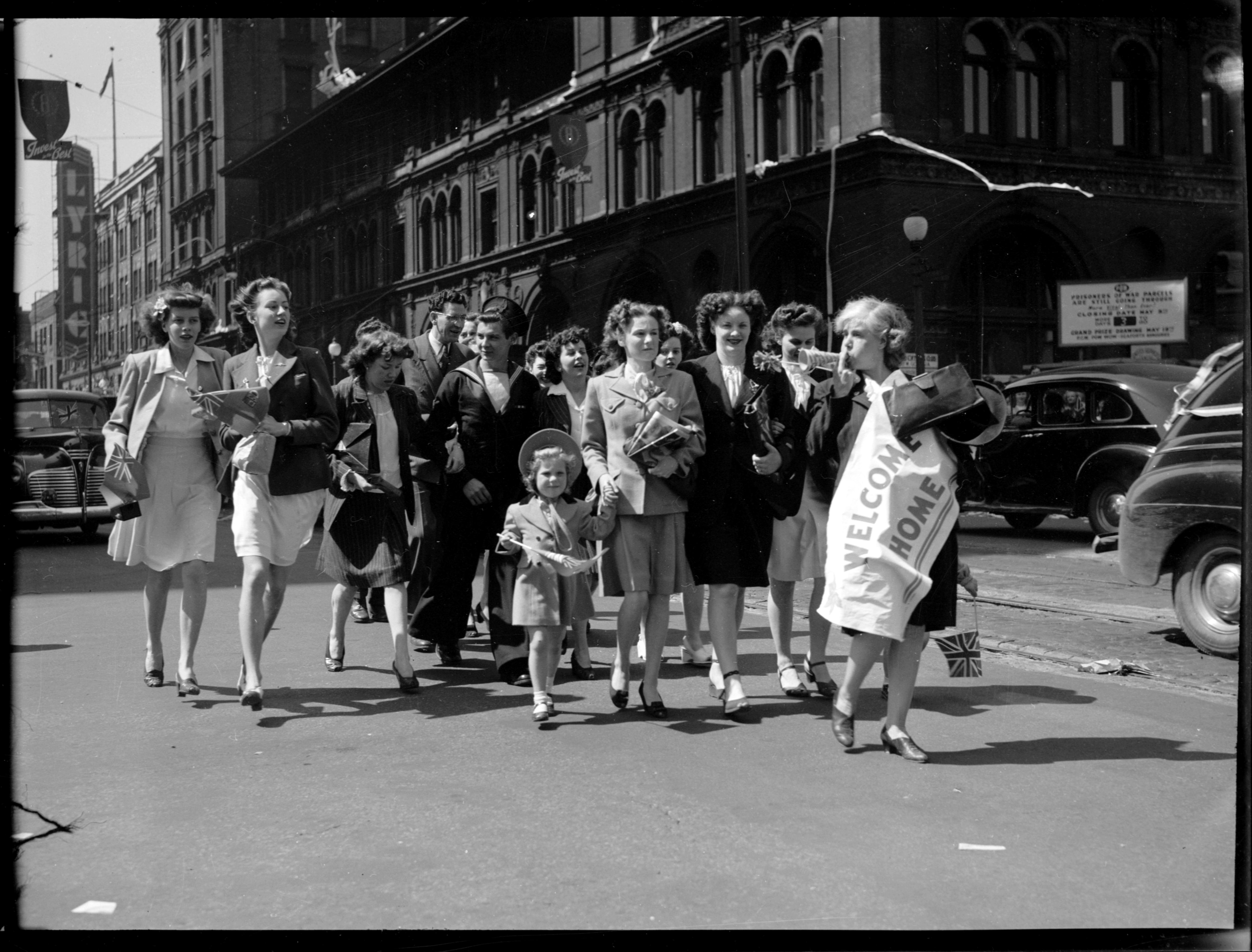
Downtown celebrations at the end of World War II

The dominance of the economy by big business was accompanied by an often militant labour movement. The first major sympathy strike was in 1903 when railway employees struck against the CPR for union recognition. Labour leader Frank Rogers was killed by CPR police while picketing at the docks, becoming the movement's first martyr in British Columbia. The rise of industrial tensions throughout the province led to Canada's first general strike in 1918, at the Cumberland coal mines on Vancouver Island. Following a lull in the 1920s, the strike wave peaked in 1935 when unemployed men flooded the city to protest conditions in the relief camps run by the military in remote areas throughout the province. After two months of daily and disruptive protesting, the relief camp strikers decided to take their grievances to the federal government and embarked on the On-to-Ottawa Trek, but their protest was put down by force. The workers were arrested near Mission and interned in work camps for the duration of the Depression.

Other social movements, such as the first-wave feminist, moral reform, and temperance movements, were also instrumental in Vancouver's development. Mary Ellen Smith, a Vancouver suffragist and prohibitionist, became the first woman elected to a provincial legislature in Canada in 1918. Alcohol prohibition began in the First World War and lasted until 1921 when the provincial government established control over alcohol sales, a practice still in place today. Canada's first drug law came about following an inquiry conducted by the federal minister of Labour and future prime minister, William Lyon Mackenzie King. King was sent to investigate damages claims resulting from a riot when the Asiatic Exclusion League led a rampage through Chinatown and Japantown. Two of the claimants were opium manufacturers, and after further investigation, King found that white women were reportedly frequenting opium dens as well as Chinese men. A federal law banning the manufacture, sale, and importation of opium for non-medicinal purposes was soon passed based on these revelations. These riots, and the formation of the Asiatic Exclusion League, also act as signs of a growing fear and mistrust towards the Japanese living in Vancouver and throughout BC. These fears were exacerbated by the attack on Pearl Harbor leading to the eventual internment or deportation of all Japanese-Canadians living in the city and the province. After the war, these Japanese-Canadian men and women were not allowed to return to cities like Vancouver causing areas, like the aforementioned Japantown, to cease to be ethnically Japanese areas as the communities never revived.

In 1928, the City of Vancouver municipally absorbed the City of South Vancouver and the Municipality of Point Grey. This amalgamation gave the city its final boundaries not long before it became the third-largest metropolis in the country. On January 1, 1929, the population of the enlarged Vancouver was 228,193.

During the late twentieth century, Vancouver's stock exchange was notorious for listing many companies that were scams or fronts for criminals. A 1989 Forbes article said the city had become the "scam capital of the world". The exchange was merged with the Alberta Stock Exchange and the Canadian Dealing Network in 1999.

=== 21st century ===
The city faced a second Stanley Cup Riot in 2011 after a defeat of the Vancouver Canucks. Vancouver attracted global attention after hosting the 2010 Winter Olympics and two games of the 2026 FIFA World Cup. In tandem with a growing cost of living, Vancouver also faced a worsening housing crisis, with increased rates of homelessness as a result. In 2016, Prime Minister Justin Trudeau described Vancouver's housing crisis as "extreme", even compared with other Canadian cities such as Toronto. Increased international immigration, foreign investment, and a lack of new purpose-built social housing or rental units have all been identified as contributing to housing unaffordability in the city.

== Geography ==
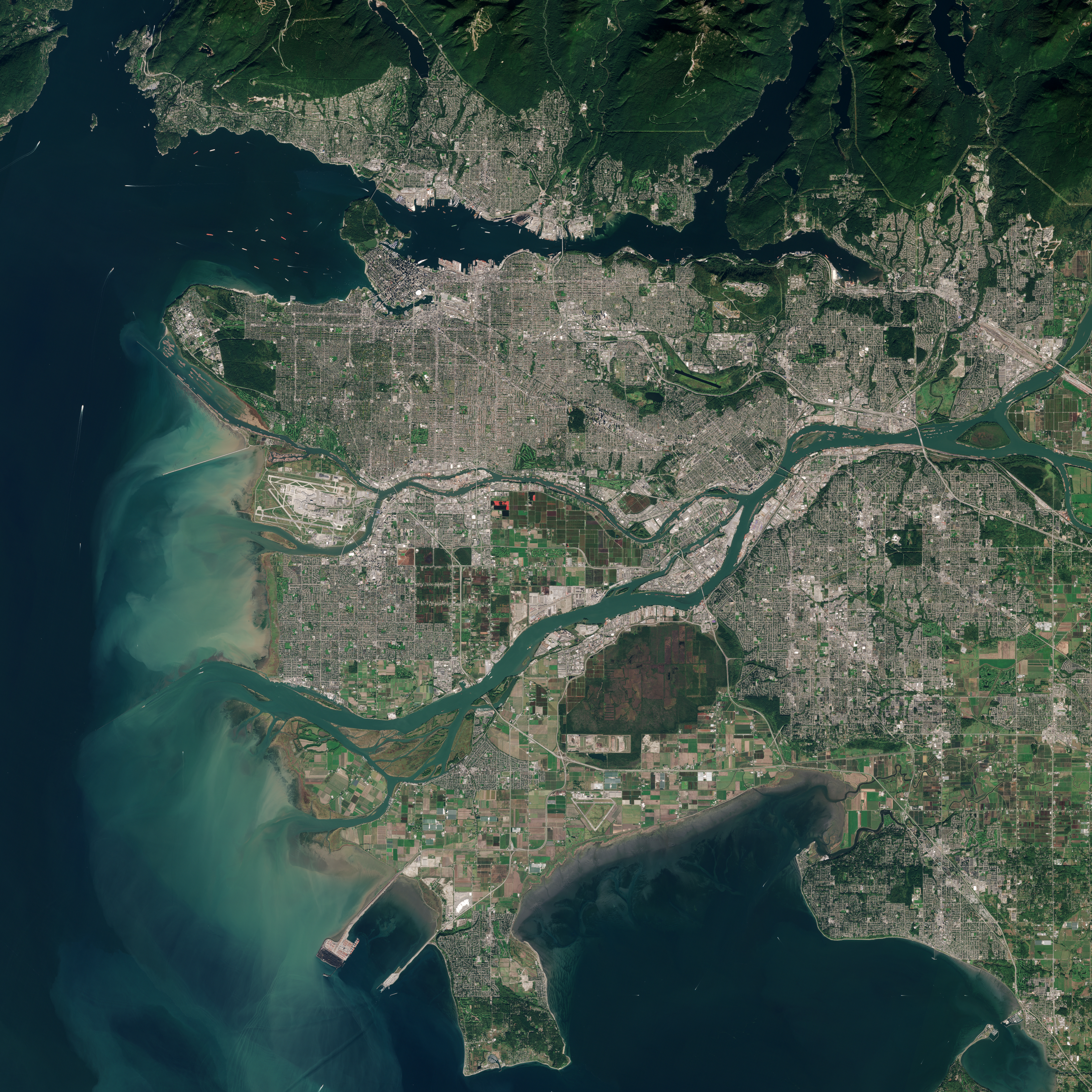
Satellite image of Metro Vancouver (2018)

Located on the Burrard Peninsula, Vancouver lies between Burrard Inlet to the north and the Fraser River to the south. The Strait of Georgia, to the west, is shielded from the Pacific Ocean by Vancouver Island. The city has an area of 115.18 km^{2} (44.47 sq mi), including both flat and hilly ground; it is within the Pacific Maritime Ecozone.

Until the city's naming in 1885, "Vancouver" referred to Vancouver Island, and it remains a common misconception that the city is located on the island. The island and the city are both named after Royal Navy Captain George Vancouver (as is the city of Vancouver, Washington, in the United States).

Vancouver has one of the largest urban parks in North America, Stanley Park, which covers 404.9 ha (1,001 acres). The North Shore Mountains dominate the cityscape, and on a clear day, scenic vistas include the snow-capped volcano Mount Baker in the state of Washington to the southeast, Vancouver Island across the Strait of Georgia to the west and southwest, and Bowen Island to the northwest.

=== Ecology ===
The vegetation in the Vancouver area was originally temperate rainforest, consisting of conifers with scattered pockets of maple and alder and large areas of swampland (even in upland areas, due to poor drainage). The conifers were a typical coastal British Columbia mix of Douglas fir, western red cedar and western hemlock. The area is thought to have had the largest trees of these species on the British Columbia Coast. Only in Elliott Bay, Seattle, did the size of trees rival those of Burrard Inlet and English Bay. The largest trees in Vancouver's old-growth forest were in the Gastown area, where the first logging occurred and on the southern slopes of False Creek and English Bay, especially around Jericho Beach. The forest in Stanley Park was logged between the 1860s and 1880s, and evidence of old-fashioned logging techniques such as springboard notches can still be seen there.

Many plants and trees growing throughout Vancouver and the Lower Mainland were imported from other parts of the continent and points across the Pacific. Examples include the monkey puzzle tree, the Japanese maple and various flowering exotics, such as magnolias, azaleas and rhododendrons. Some species imported from harsher climates in Eastern Canada or Europe have grown to immense sizes. The native Douglas maple can also attain a tremendous size. Many of the city's streets are lined with flowering varieties of Japanese cherry trees donated from the 1930s onward by the government of Japan. These flower for several weeks in early spring each year, an occasion celebrated by the Vancouver Cherry Blossom Festival. Other streets are lined with flowering chestnut, horse chestnut and other decorative shade trees.

=== Climate ===
Vancouver

Climate chart (precipitation, max. and min. temperature)
J	F	M	A	M	J	J	A	S	O	N	D
168 7 1	105 8 2	114 10 3	89 13 6	65 17 9	54 20 12	36 22 14	37 22 14	51 19 11	121 14 7	189 9 4	162 6 1
- █ Average max. and min. temperatures in °C
- █ Precipitation totals in mm
Imperial conversion
J	F	M	A	M	J	J	A	S	O	N	D
6.6 44 35	4.1 47 35	4.5 51 38	3.5 56 42	2.6 62 48	2.1 67 53	1.4 72 57	1.4 72 57	2 66 51	4.8 56 45	7.4 49 38	6.4 43 33
- █ Average max. and min. temperatures in °F
- █ Precipitation totals in inches

Vancouver's climate, one of the mildest and most temperate climates in Canada, is classified as an oceanic climate (Köppen: Cfb) bordering on a warm-summer Mediterranean climate (Köppen: Csb). While the city has the coolest summer average high of all major Canadian metropolitan areas, winters in Greater Vancouver are the fourth-mildest of Canadian cities, after nearby Victoria, Nanaimo and Duncan, all on Vancouver Island.

Vancouver is one of the wettest Canadian cities. However, precipitation varies throughout the metropolitan area. Annual precipitation as measured at Vancouver International Airport in Richmond averages 1,189 mm (46.8 in), compared with 1,588 mm (62.5 in) in the downtown area and 2,044 mm (80.5 in) in North Vancouver. The daily maximum averages 22 °C (72 °F) in July and August, with highs rarely reaching 30 °C (86 °F). The summer months are typically dry, with only one in five days receiving precipitation during July and August. In contrast, most days from November through March record some precipitation.

The highest temperature ever recorded at the airport was 34.4 °C (93.9 °F) set on July 30, 2009, and the highest temperature ever recorded within the city of Vancouver was 35.0 °C (95.0 °F) occurring first on July 31, 1965, again on August 8, 1981, and also on May 29, 1983. The coldest temperature ever recorded in the city was −17.8 °C (0.0 °F) on January 14, 1950 and again on December 29, 1968.

On average, snow falls nine days per year, with three days receiving 5 cm (2.0 in) or more. Average yearly snowfall is 38.1 cm (15.0 in) but typically does not remain on the ground for long.

Vancouver's growing season averages 237 days, from March 18 until November 10. Vancouver's 1981–2010 USDA Plant Hardiness Zone ranges from 8a to 9a depending on elevation and proximity to water.

Due to the mild climate, Vancouver is a popular city for the cultivation of various cold-hardy palm trees. The most popular location for planting palms is English Bay, and the most popular palm is Trachycarpus fortunei. They were first planted in the 1980s.

Climate data for Richmond (Vancouver International Airport) Climate ID: 1108447; coordinates 49°11′42″N 123°10′55″W; elevation: 4.3 m (14 ft); 1991–2020 normals, extremes 1898–present (Note: 1981–2010 normals are for Vancouver International Airport, while extreme high and low temperatures are from Vancouver PMO (October 1898 to May 1945), and Vancouver International Airport (January 1937 to present).)
Month	Jan	Feb	Mar	Apr	May	Jun	Jul	Aug	Sep	Oct	Nov	Dec	Year
Record high humidex	17.2	18.0	20.3	24.7	33.7	38.4	38.3	35.9	33.0	27.2	21.1	16.6	38.4
Record high °C (°F)	15.3 (59.5)	18.4 (65.1)	20.0 (68.0)	26.1 (79.0)	30.4 (86.7)	33.3 (91.9)	34.4 (93.9)	33.3 (91.9)	30.0 (86.0)	25.0 (77.0)	23.3 (73.9)	15.7 (60.3)	34.4 (93.9)
Mean maximum °C (°F)	12.2 (54.0)	12.8 (55.0)	15.2 (59.4)	18.8 (65.8)	23.5 (74.3)	25.9 (78.6)	27.8 (82.0)	27.3 (81.1)	24.6 (76.3)	19.1 (66.4)	14.6 (58.3)	11.7 (53.1)	28.9 (84.0)
Mean daily maximum °C (°F)	6.8 (44.2)	7.9 (46.2)	10.1 (50.2)	13.1 (55.6)	16.9 (62.4)	19.6 (67.3)	22.4 (72.3)	22.4 (72.3)	19.1 (66.4)	13.5 (56.3)	9.3 (48.7)	6.6 (43.9)	14.0 (57.2)
Daily mean °C (°F)	4.1 (39.4)	4.7 (40.5)	6.7 (44.1)	9.4 (48.9)	13.0 (55.4)	15.8 (60.4)	18.2 (64.8)	18.2 (64.8)	15.2 (59.4)	10.3 (50.5)	6.4 (43.5)	3.9 (39.0)	10.5 (50.9)
Mean daily minimum °C (°F)	1.4 (34.5)	1.5 (34.7)	3.3 (37.9)	5.7 (42.3)	9.0 (48.2)	11.9 (53.4)	13.9 (57.0)	14.0 (57.2)	11.2 (52.2)	7.0 (44.6)	3.6 (38.5)	1.2 (34.2)	7.0 (44.6)
Mean minimum °C (°F)	−6.5 (20.3)	−4.1 (24.6)	−2.0 (28.4)	1.2 (34.2)	4.4 (39.9)	8.2 (46.8)	10.6 (51.1)	10.8 (51.4)	6.8 (44.2)	0.9 (33.6)	−3.6 (25.5)	−5.9 (21.4)	−8.8 (16.2)
Record low °C (°F)	−17.8 (0.0)	−16.1 (3.0)	−9.4 (15.1)	−3.3 (26.1)	0.6 (33.1)	3.9 (39.0)	6.1 (43.0)	3.9 (39.0)	−1.1 (30.0)	−6.1 (21.0)	−14.3 (6.3)	−17.8 (0.0)	−17.8 (0.0)
Record low wind chill	−22.6	−21.2	−14.5	−5.4	0.0	0.0	0.0	0.0	0.0	−11.4	−21.3	−27.8	−27.8
Average precipitation mm (inches)	174.0 (6.85)	90.8 (3.57)	106.4 (4.19)	85.5 (3.37)	59.1 (2.33)	51.1 (2.01)	34.1 (1.34)	36.1 (1.42)	51.9 (2.04)	123.9 (4.88)	174.6 (6.87)	172.2 (6.78)	1,159.5 (45.65)
Average rainfall mm (inches)	162.1 (6.38)	84.6 (3.33)	104.1 (4.10)	85.2 (3.35)	59.1 (2.33)	51.1 (2.01)	34.1 (1.34)	36.1 (1.42)	51.9 (2.04)	123.7 (4.87)	171.2 (6.74)	155.8 (6.13)	1,119.2 (44.06)
Average snowfall cm (inches)	12.3 (4.8)	4.5 (1.8)	2.6 (1.0)	0.1 (0.0)	0.0 (0.0)	0.0 (0.0)	0.0 (0.0)	0.0 (0.0)	0.0 (0.0)	0.1 (0.0)	3.2 (1.3)	13.9 (5.5)	36.6 (14.4)
Average precipitation days (≥ 0.2 mm)	20.0	15.5	17.6	15.3	12.7	11.6	6.2	6.4	8.6	15.4	19.6	20.5	169.5
Average rainy days (≥ 0.2 mm)	18.8	14.7	17.3	15.3	12.7	11.6	6.2	6.4	8.6	15.4	19.3	19.7	166.0
Average snowy days (≥ 0.2 cm)	2.7	1.2	0.84	0.12	0.0	0.0	0.0	0.0	0.0	0.04	0.64	1.9	7.4
Average relative humidity (%) (at 15:00 LST)	81.1	74.8	70.1	65.7	63.7	62.0	61.2	62.2	67.9	76.2	80.0	81.9	70.6
Average dew point °C (°F)	2.1 (35.8)	1.7 (35.1)	3.1 (37.6)	5.2 (41.4)	8.4 (47.1)	10.6 (51.1)	12.8 (55.0)	13.3 (55.9)	11.4 (52.5)	7.8 (46.0)	4.2 (39.6)	1.9 (35.4)	6.9 (44.4)
Mean monthly sunshine hours	60.2	91.0	134.8	185.0	222.5	226.9	289.8	277.1	212.8	120.7	60.4	56.5	1,937.5
Percentage possible sunshine	22.3	31.8	36.6	45.0	46.9	46.8	59.3	62.1	56.1	36.0	21.9	22.0	40.6
Average ultraviolet index	1	1	3	4	6	6	7	6	4	2	1	1	4
Source 1: Environment and Climate Change Canada (sun 1981–2010)
Source 2: Weather Atlas(UV) weatherstats.ca (for dewpoint and monthly/yearly average absolute maximum/minimum temperature)

== Cityscape ==
=== Urban planning ===
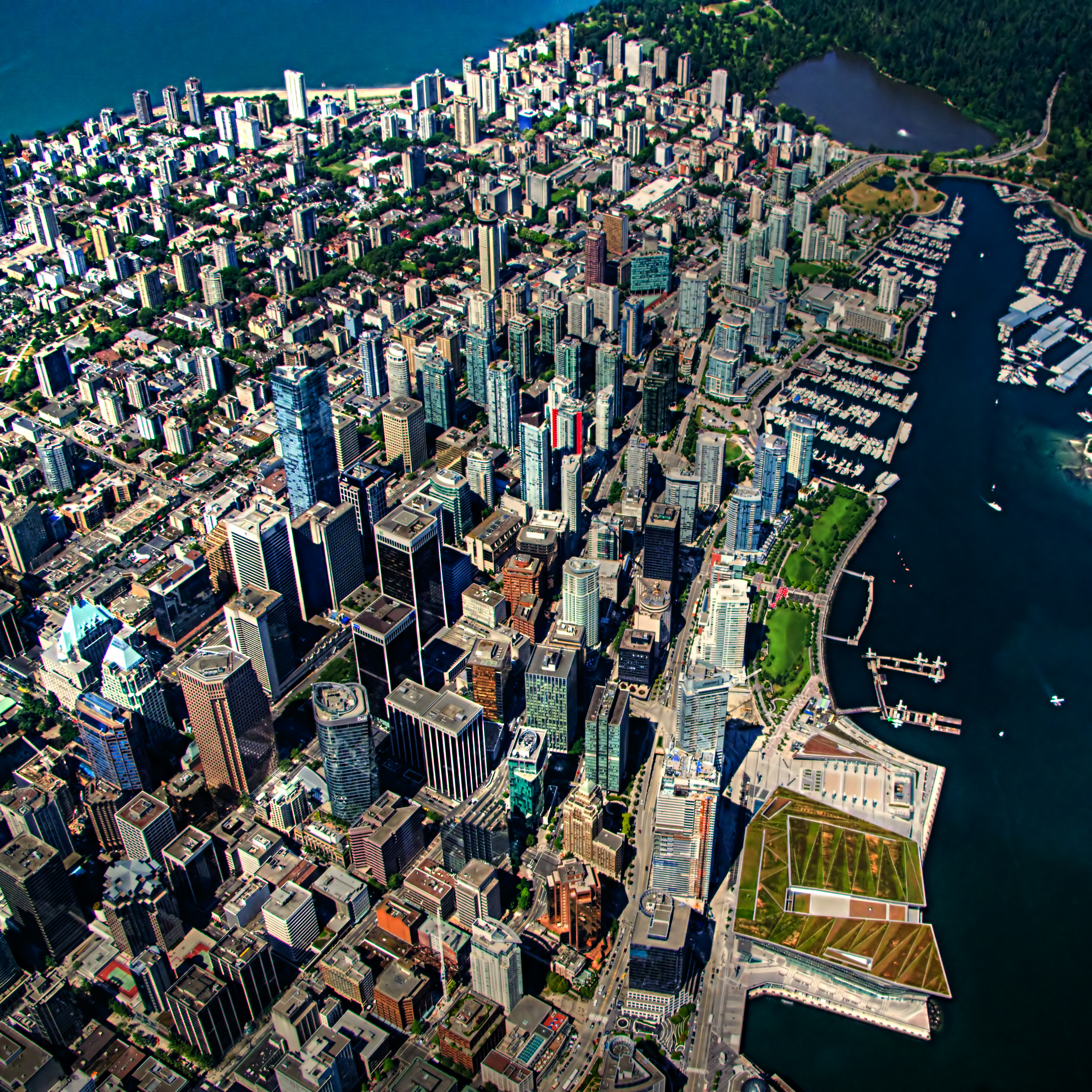
Aerial view of Downtown Vancouver. Urban development in Vancouver is characterized by a large residential population living in the city centre with mixed-use developments.

As of 2021, Vancouver is the most densely populated city in Canada. Urban planning in Vancouver is characterized by high-rise residential and mixed-use development in urban centres, as an alternative to sprawl. As part of the larger Metro Vancouver region, it is influenced by the policy direction of livability as illustrated in Metro Vancouver's Regional Growth Strategy.

Vancouver ranked high on the Global Liveability Ranking and stood at number 1 on the list for several years until 2011. In recent years, it has dropped, ranking as low as 16 in 2021. As of 2022, Vancouver was ranked as having the fifth-highest quality of living of any city on Earth. According to Forbes, Vancouver had the fourth-most expensive real estate market in the world in 2019. Vancouver has also been ranked among Canada's most expensive cities in which to live. Sales in February 2016 were 56.3 percent higher than the 10-year average for the month. Forbes also ranked Vancouver as the tenth-cleanest city in the world in 2007.

Vancouver's characteristic approach to urban planning originated in the late 1950s, when city planners began to encourage the building of high-rise residential towers in Vancouver's West End, subject to strict requirements for setbacks and open space to protect sight lines and preserve green space. The success of these dense but livable neighbourhoods led to the redevelopment of urban industrial sites, such as North False Creek and Coal Harbour, beginning in the mid-1980s. The result is a compact urban core that has gained international recognition for its "high amenity and 'livable' development". In 2006, the city launched a planning initiative entitled EcoDensity, with the stated goal of exploring ways in which "density, design, and land use can contribute to environmental sustainability, affordability, and livability".

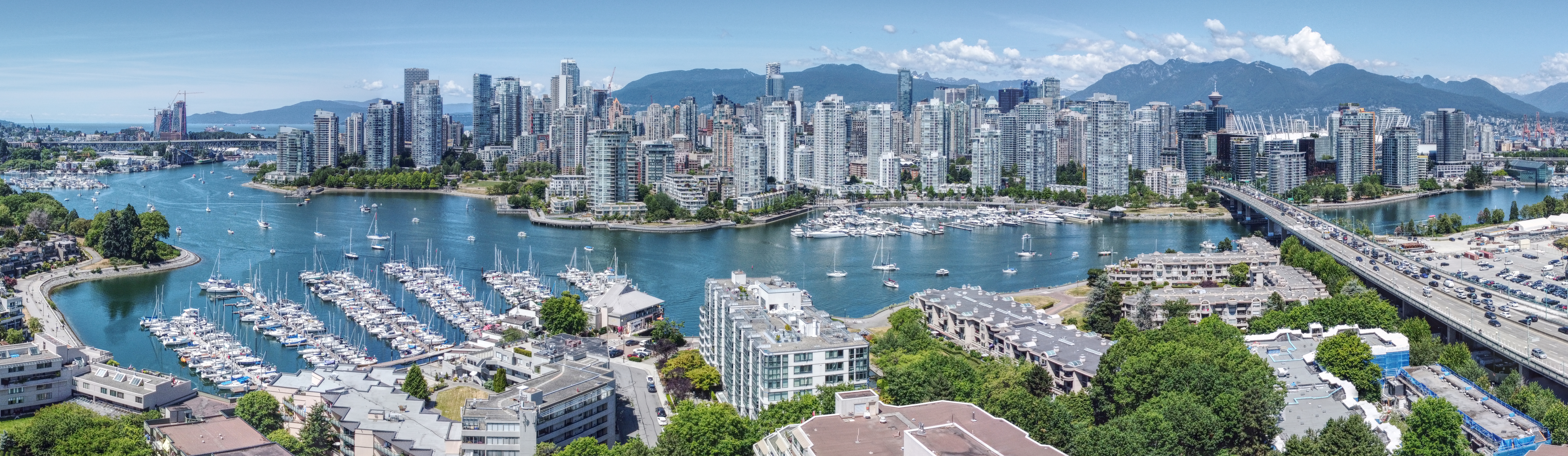
Vancouver skyline and False Creek viewed from the Fairview neighbourhood

=== Architecture ===
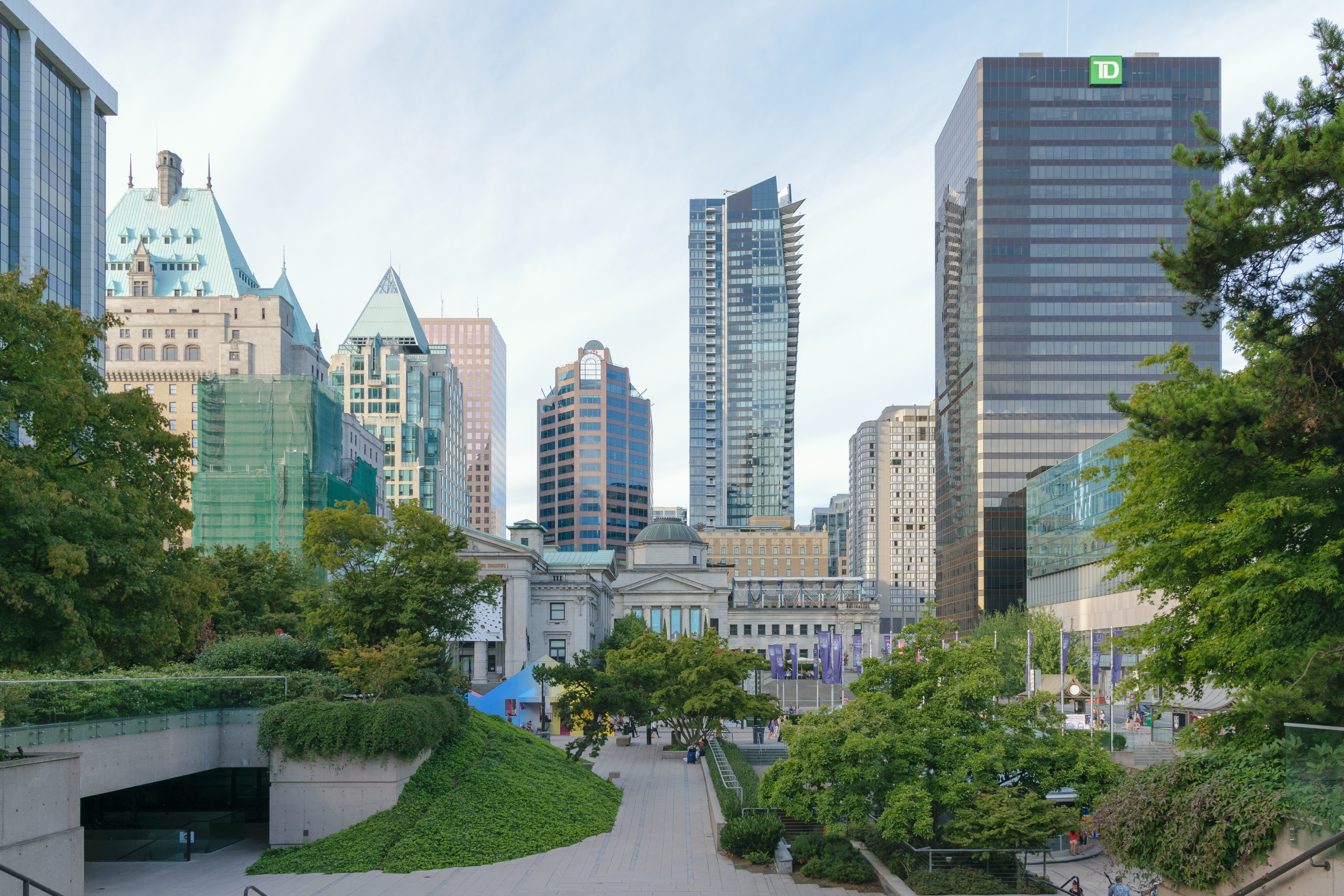
Robson Square is a civic centre and public square designed by local architect Arthur Erickson.

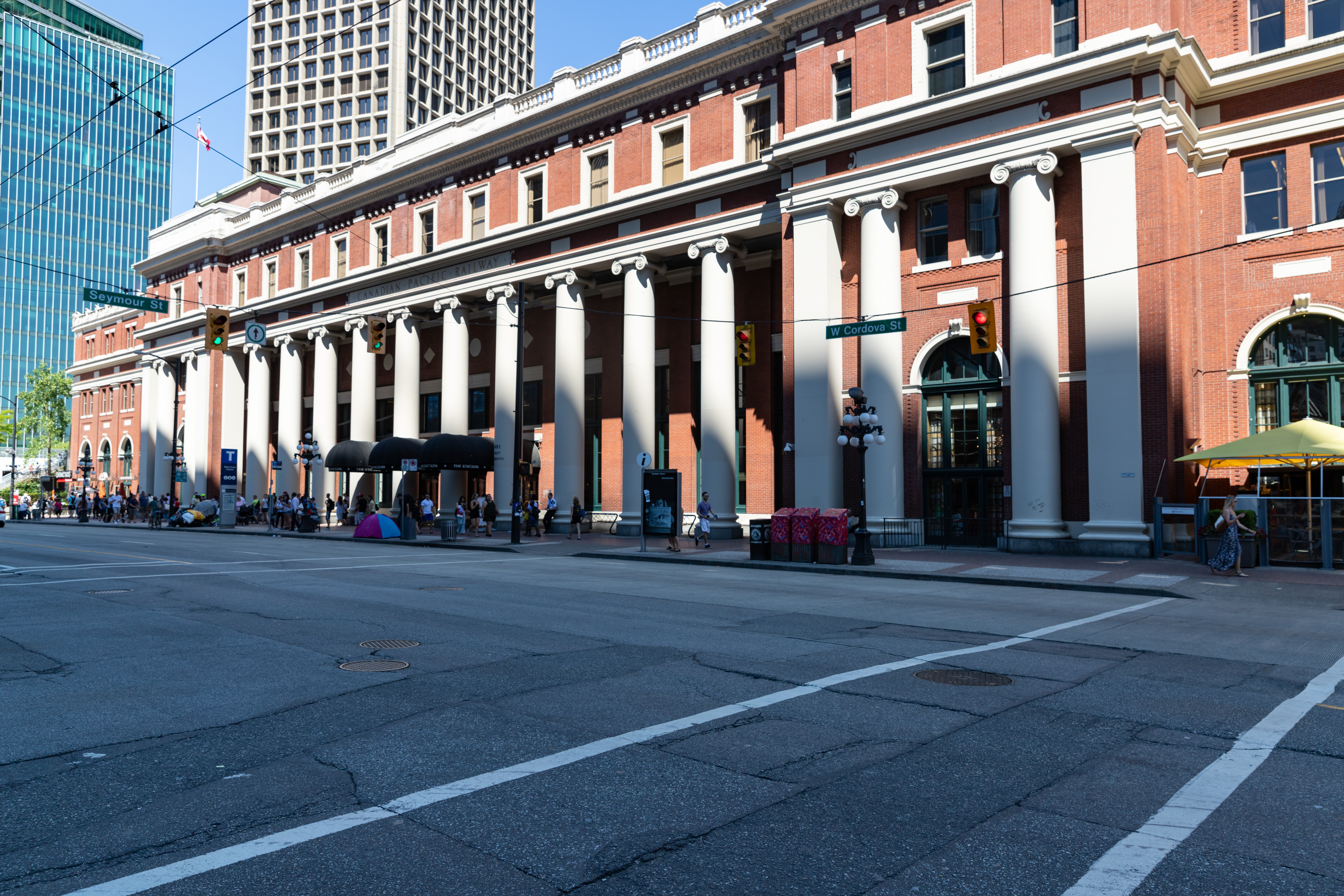
Waterfront station, Vancouver

The Vancouver Art Gallery is housed downtown in the neoclassical former courthouse built in 1906. The courthouse building was designed by Francis Rattenbury, who also designed the British Columbia Parliament Buildings and the Empress Hotel in Victoria, and the lavishly decorated second Hotel Vancouver. The 556-room Hotel Vancouver, opened in 1939 and the third by that name, is across the street with its copper roof. The Gothic-style Christ Church Cathedral, across from the hotel, opened in 1894 and was declared a heritage building in 1976.

There are several modern buildings in the downtown area, including the Harbour Centre, the Vancouver Law Courts and surrounding plaza known as Robson Square (designed by Arthur Erickson) and the Vancouver Library Square (designed by Moshe Safdie and DA Architects), reminiscent of the Colosseum in Rome, and the recently completed Woodward's building Redevelopment (designed by Henriquez Partners Architects).

The original BC Hydro headquarters building (designed by Ron Thom and Ned Pratt) at Nelson and Burrard Streets is a modernist high-rise, now converted into the Electra condominium. Also notable is the "concrete waffle" of the MacMillan Bloedel building on the north-east corner of the Georgia and Thurlow intersection.

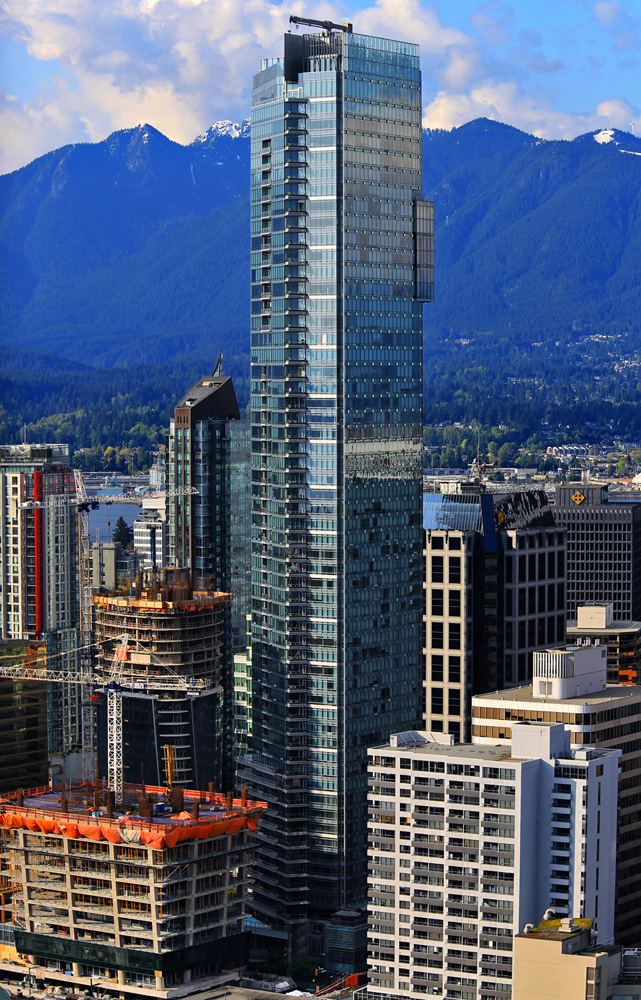
Completed in 2008, Living Shangri-La is the tallest building in Vancouver.

A prominent addition to the city's landscape is the giant tent-frame Canada Place (designed by Zeidler Roberts Partnership Partnership, MCMP & DA Architects), the former Canada Pavilion from the 1986 World Exposition, which includes part of the Convention Centre, the Pan-Pacific Hotel, and a cruise ship terminal. Two modern buildings that define the southern skyline away from the downtown area are City Hall and the Centennial Pavilion of Vancouver General Hospital, both designed by Townley and Matheson in 1936 and 1958, respectively.

A collection of Edwardian buildings in the city's old downtown core were, in their day, the tallest commercial buildings in the British Empire. These were, in succession, the Carter-Cotton Building (former home of The Province newspaper), the Dominion Building (1907) and the Sun Tower (1911), the former two at Cambie and Hastings Streets and the latter at Beatty and Pender Streets. The Sun Tower's cupola was finally exceeded as the Empire's tallest commercial building by the elaborate Art Deco Marine Building in the 1920s. The Marine Building is known for its elaborate ceramic tile facings and brass-gilt doors and elevators, which make it a favourite location for movie shoots. Topping the list of tallest buildings in Vancouver is Living Shangri-La, the second tallest building in BC at 201 m (659 ft) and 62 storeys. The second-tallest building in Vancouver is the Paradox Hotel Vancouver at 188 m (617 ft), followed by the Private Residences at Hotel Georgia, at 156 m (512 ft). The fourth-tallest is One Wall Centre at 150 m (490 ft) and 48 storeys, followed closely by the Rogers Tower at 149 m (489 ft).

== Demographics ==
Vancouver
Year	Pop.	±%
1891	13,709	—
1901	26,133	+90.6%
1911	100,401	+284.2%
1921	117,217	+16.7%
1931	246,593	+110.4%
1941	275,353	+11.7%
1951	344,833	+25.2%
1956	365,844	+6.1%
1961	384,522	+5.1%
1966	410,375	+6.7%
1971	426,256	+3.9%
1976	410,188	−3.8%
1981	414,281	+1.0%
1986	431,147	+4.1%
1991	471,644	+9.4%
1996	514,008	+9.0%
2001	545,671	+6.2%
2006	578,041	+5.9%
2011	603,502	+4.4%
2016	631,486	+4.6%
2021	662,248	+4.9%
Source: Statistics Canada

In the 2021 Canadian census conducted by Statistics Canada, Vancouver had a population of 662,248 living in 305,336 of its 328,347 total private dwellings, a change of 4.9% from its 2016 population of 631,486, making it the eighth-largest among Canadian cities. More specifically, Vancouver is the fourth-largest in Western Canada after Calgary, Edmonton and Winnipeg. With a land area of 115.18 km^{2} (44.47 sq mi), it had a population density of 5,749.7/km^{2} (14,891.6/sq mi) in 2021, the most densely populated Canadian municipality with more than 5,000 residents.

At the census metropolitan area (CMA) level in the 2021 census, the metropolitan area referred to as Greater Vancouver had a population of 2,642,825 living in 1,043,319 of its 1,104,532 total private dwellings, a change of 7.3% from its 2016 population of 2,463,431, the third-most populous metropolitan area in the country and the most populous in Western Canada. With a land area of 2,878.93 km^{2} (1,111.56 sq mi), it had a population density of 918.0/km^{2} (2,377.6/sq mi) in 2021. Approximately 75 percent of the people living in Metro Vancouver live outside Vancouver itself.

The larger Lower Mainland-Southwest economic region (which includes also the Squamish-Lillooet, Fraser Valley, and Sunshine Coast Regional District) has a population of over 3.04 million.

The 2021 census reported that immigrants (individuals born outside Canada) comprise 274,365 persons or 42.2% of the total population of Vancouver. Of the total immigrant population, the top countries of origin were mainland China (63,275 persons or 23.1%), Philippines (29,930 persons or 10.9%), Hong Kong (25,480 persons or 9.3%), India (14,640 persons or 5.3%), United Kingdom (12,895 persons or 4.7%), Vietnam (12,120 persons or 4.4%), Taiwan (9,870 persons or 3.6%), United States of America (9,790 persons or 3.6%), Iran (8,775 persons or 3.2%), and South Korea (6,495 persons or 2.4%).

=== Ethnicity ===
Pan-ethnic breakdown of Vancouver from the 2021 census
1. European (Note: Statistic includes all persons that did not make up part of a visible minority or an indigenous identity.) (43.2%)
2. East Asian (Note: Statistic includes total responses of "Chinese", "Korean", and "Japanese" under visible minority section on the census.) (29.3%)
3. Southeast Asian (Note: Statistic includes total responses of "Filipino" and "Southeast Asian" under visible minority section on the census.) (9.10%)
4. South Asian (6.90%)
5. Latin American (2.78%)
6. Middle Eastern (Note: Statistic includes total responses of "West Asian" and "Arab" under visible minority section on the census.) (2.44%)
7. Indigenous (2.25%)
8. African (1.31%)
9. Other (Note: Statistic includes total responses of "Visible minority, n.i.e." and "Multiple visible minorities" under the visible minority section on the census.) (2.74%)

Largest panethnic groups in Vancouver by census tract based on the 2021 census

Vancouver has been called a "city of neighbourhoods". Each neighbourhood in Vancouver has a distinct character and ethnic mix. People of English, Scottish, and Irish origins were historically the largest ethnic groups in the city, and elements of British society and culture are still visible in some areas, particularly South Granville and Kerrisdale. Germans are the next-largest European ethnic group in Vancouver and were a leading force in the city's society and economy until the rise of anti-German sentiment with the outbreak of World War I in 1914. Today, Chinese are the largest visible ethnic group in Vancouver; the city has a diverse Chinese-speaking community with speakers of several dialects, notably Cantonese and Mandarin. Neighbourhoods with distinct ethnic commercial areas include Chinatown, Punjabi Market, Little Italy, Greektown, and (formerly) Japantown.

Since the 1980s, immigration increased substantially, making the city more ethnically and linguistically diverse; 49 percent of Vancouver's residents do not speak English as their first language. Over 25 percent of the city's inhabitants are of Chinese heritage. In the 1980s, an influx of immigrants from Hong Kong in anticipation of the transfer of sovereignty from the United Kingdom to China, combined with an increase in immigrants from mainland China and previous immigrants from Taiwan, established in Vancouver one of the highest concentrations of ethnic Chinese residents in North America. Another significant Asian ethnic group in Vancouver includes South Asians, forming approximately 7 percent of the city's inhabitants; while a small community had existed in the city since 1897, larger waves of migration began in the 1950s and 1960s, prompting new Punjabi immigrants to establish a Little India (known as Punjabi Market) and preside over much of the mass construction of the Vancouver Special across the southeastern quadrant of the city, notably within the Sunset neighbourhood prior to the suburbanization of the community to outer suburbs such as Surrey or Delta.

Other Asian-origin groups that reside in Vancouver include Filipinos (5.9%), Japanese (1.7%), Korean (1.7%), West Asians (1.9%), as well as sizeable communities of Vietnamese, Indonesians, and Cambodians. Despite increases in Latin American immigration to Vancouver in the 1980s and 1990s, recent immigration has been comparatively low. However, growth in the Latino population – which largely consists of Mexicans and Salvadorans – rose in the late 2010s and early 2020s. African immigration has been similarly stagnant (3.6% and 3.3% of total immigrant population, respectively). The black population of Vancouver is small in comparison to other Canadian major cities, making up 1.3 percent of the city. Hogan's Alley, a small area adjacent to Chinatown, just off Main Street at Prior, was once home to a significant black community. The Black population consists of Somalis, Jamaicans/Caribbeans, and other groups, including those who descended from African Americans. The neighbourhood of Strathcona was the core of the city's Jewish community. In 1981, approximately 24 percent of the city population belonged to a visible minority group; at the same time, this proportion was roughly 14 percent for the entire metropolitan area. By 2016, the proportion in the city had grown to 52 percent.

Prior to the Hong Kong diaspora of the 1990s, the largest non-British ethnic groups in the city were Irish and German, followed by Scandinavian, Italian, Ukrainian, Chinese, and Punjabi. From the mid-1950s until the 1980s, many Portuguese immigrants came to Vancouver, and the city had the third-largest Portuguese population in Canada in 2001. Eastern Europeans, including Russians, Czechs, Poles, Romanians and Hungarians began immigrating after the Soviet takeover of Eastern Europe after World War II. Greek immigration increased in the late 1960s and early '70s, with most settling in the Kitsilano area. Vancouver also has a significant aboriginal community of about 15,000 people.

=== Sexual orientation and gender identity ===
Vancouver has a large LGBT community, with a recognized gay male enclave focused in the West End neighbourhood of the downtown core, particularly along Davie Street, officially designated as Davie Village, though the gay community is omnipresent throughout West End and Yaletown areas. Vancouver is host to one of the country's largest annual pride parades.

=== Language ===
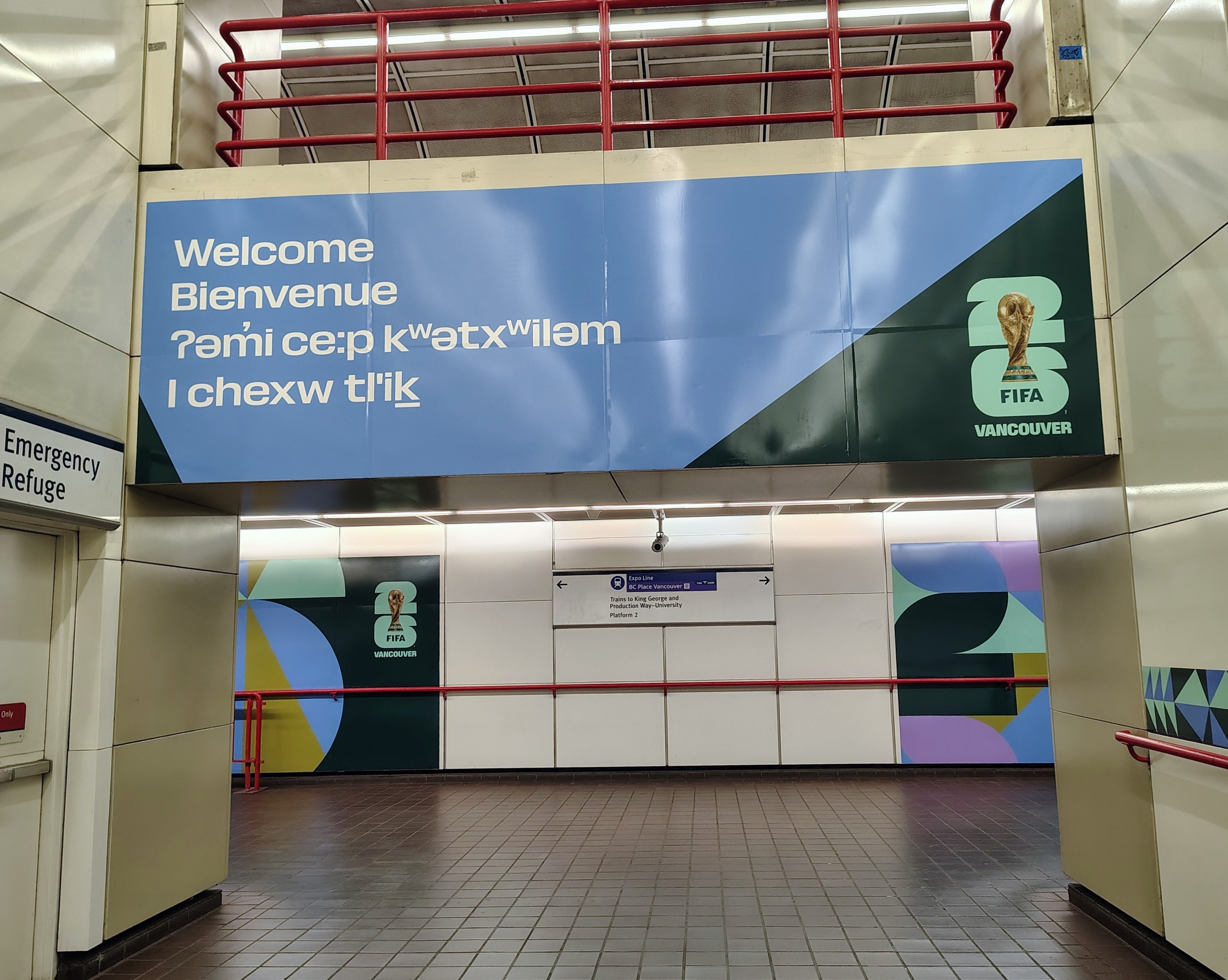
Multilingual sign inside Granville station, in English, French, Hunʼqumiʼnum, and Squamish

According to the 2021 Canadian census, 612,215 persons, or 94.1% of Vancouver's population, know the English language; 96,965 persons or 14.9% of the population, know the Cantonese language, followed by Mandarin (74,695 or 11.5%), French (60,990 or 9.4%), Tagalog (30,430 or 4.7%), Punjabi (19,130 or 2.9%), Hindi (15,025 or 2.3%), Vietnamese (14,905 or 2.3%), Persian languages (12,330 or 1.9%), Japanese (12,075 or 1.9%), German (11,050 or 1.7%), Korean (10,480 or 1.6%), Portuguese (8,715 or 1.3%), Italian (7,740 or 1.2%), and Russian (7,620 or 1.2%).

Furthermore, the 2021 census stated 332,135 persons or 50.7% of Vancouver's population have English as a mother tongue; Cantonese is the mother tongue of 77,435 persons or 11.8% of the population, followed by Mandarin (41,695 or 6.4%), Tagalog (18,675 or 2.9%), Spanish (16,735 or 2.6%), Punjabi (13,305 or 2.0%), Vietnamese (11,870 or 1.8%), Persian languages (10,315 or 1.6%), Korean (8,605 or 1.3%), Japanese (7,150 or 1.1%), Portuguese (6,740 or 1.0%), Russian (5,155 or 0.8%), German (4,725 or 0.7%), Hindi (4,355 or 0.7%), and Italian (4,000 or 0.6%).

=== Religion ===
While most British Columbians are secular or non-religious, Vancouver's Asian population has been noted for its Christian faith. As of the 2021 Canadian census, religious groups in Vancouver include:

- Irreligion (362,925 persons or 55.8%)
- Christianity (194,365 persons or 29.9%)
- Buddhism (26,245 persons or 4.0%)
- Islam (17,910 persons or 2.8%)
- Sikhism (16,535 persons or 2.5%)
- Hinduism (12,585 persons or 1.9%)
- Judaism (11,675 persons or 1.8%)
- Indigenous spirituality (480 persons or 0.1%)
- Other (7,665 persons or 1.2%)

Religious groups in Vancouver (1991–2021)
Religious group	2021		2011		2001		1991	
Religious group	Pop.	%	Pop.	%	Pop.	%	Pop.	%
Christian	194,365	29.88%	213,855	36.23%	229,015	42.44%	238,460	51.25%
Buddhist	26,245	4.04%	33,450	5.67%	37,140	6.88%	20,595	4.43%
Muslim	17,910	2.75%	13,255	2.25%	9,345	1.73%	5,785	1.24%
Sikh	16,535	2.54%	16,815	2.85%	15,200	2.82%	12,935	2.78%
Hindu	12,585	1.94%	8,220	1.39%	7,670	1.42%	6,745	1.45%
Jewish	11,675	1.8%	10,350	1.75%	9,620	1.78%	8,675	1.86%
Other religion	8,145	1.25%	5,820	0.99%	3,705	0.69%	3,190	0.69%
Irreligious	362,925	55.8%	288,435	48.87%	227,925	42.24%	168,910	36.3%
Total responses	650,380	98.21%	590,205	97.8%	539,630	98.89%	465,300	98.61%

=== Homelessness ===
Homelessness is a significant and persistent issue in Vancouver. A 2019 count found that at least 2,223 people in the city were experiencing homelessness, the highest number recorded since counts began in 2005. Of those surveyed, 28 percent reported having no physical shelter. Indigenous people accounted for 39 percent of all respondents. Three-fifths of respondents said at least two health concerns, and 67 percent said an addiction to at least one substance.

== Economy ==
With its location on the Pacific Rim and at the western terminus of Canada's transcontinental highway and rail routes, Vancouver is one of the nation's largest industrial centres. Port Metro Vancouver, Canada's largest and most diversified port, does more than $172 billion in trade with over 160 different trading economies annually. Port activities generate $9.7 billion in gross domestic product and $20.3 billion in economic output. Vancouver is also the headquarters of forest product and mining companies. In recent years, Vancouver has become a centre for software development, biotechnology, aerospace, video game development, animation studios and television production and film industry. Vancouver hosts approximately 65 movies and 55 TV series annually and is the third largest film and TV production centre in North America, supporting 20,000 jobs. The city's strong focus on lifestyle and health culture also makes it a hub for many lifestyle brands with Lululemon, Arc'teryx, Kit and Ace, Mountain Equipment Co-op, Herschel Supply Co., Aritzia, Reigning Champ, and Nature's Path Foods all founded and headquartered in Vancouver. Vancouver was also the birthplace of 1-800-GOT-JUNK? and Western Canada's largest online-only publication, Daily Hive.

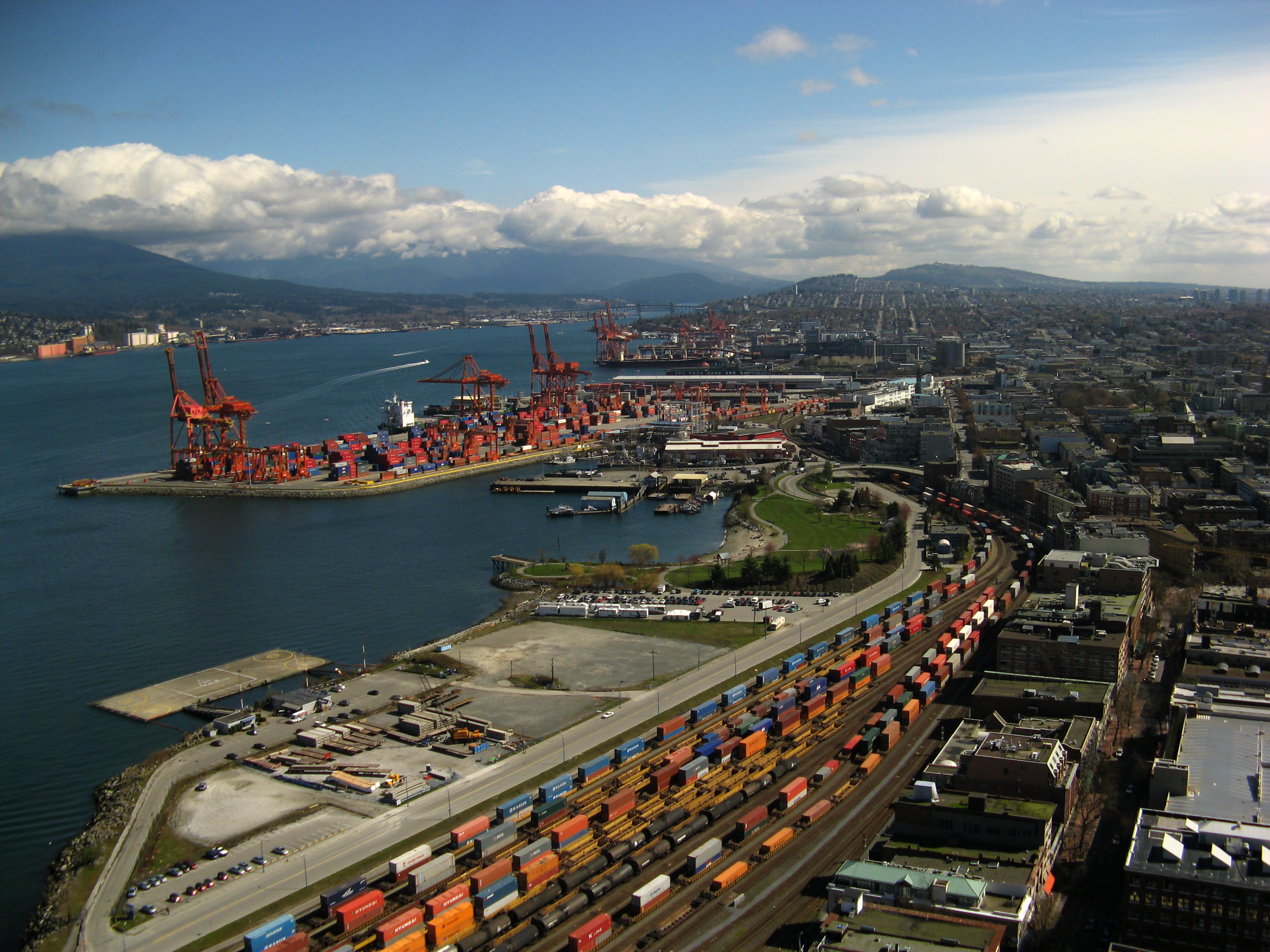
The Port of Vancouver is the largest port in Canada and the third-largest port in the Americas (by tonnage).

Conversely, since the onset of the global COVID-19 pandemic in 2020, multiple media organizations and economists have continued to warn of a severe long-term economic doom loop impending for Vancouver, similar to the decline noted in San Francisco, California.

Vancouver's scenic location makes it a major tourist destination. Over 10.3 million people visited Vancouver in 2017. Annually, tourism contributes approximately $4.8 billion to the Metro Vancouver economy and supports over 70,000 jobs. Many visit to see the city's gardens, Stanley Park, Queen Elizabeth Park, VanDusen Botanical Garden and the mountains, ocean, forest and parklands which surround the city. Each year over a million people pass through Vancouver on cruise ship vacations, often bound for Alaska.

Vancouver is the most stressed city in the spectrum of affordability of housing in Canada. In 2012, Vancouver was ranked by Demographia as the second-most unaffordable city in the world, rated as even more severely unaffordable in 2012 than in 2011. The city has adopted various strategies to reduce housing costs, including cooperative housing, legalized secondary suites, increased density and smart growth. As of April 2010, the average two-level home in Vancouver sold for a record high of $987,500, compared with the Canadian average of $365,141. A factor explaining the high property prices may be policies by the Canadian government which permit snow washing, which allows foreigners to buy property in Canada while shielding their identities from tax authorities, making real estate transactions an effective way to conduct money laundering.

Since the 1990s, the development of high-rise condominiums in the downtown peninsula has been financed, in part, by an inflow of capital from Hong Kong immigrants due to the former colony's 1997 handover to China. Such development has clustered in the Yaletown and Coal Harbour districts and around many of the SkyTrain stations to the east of the downtown. The city's selection to co-host the 2010 Winter Olympics was also a major influence on economic development. Concern was expressed that Vancouver's increasing homelessness problem would be exacerbated by the Olympics because owners of single-room occupancy hotels, which house many of the city's lowest-income residents, converted their properties to attract higher-income residents and tourists. Another significant international event held in Vancouver, the 1986 World Exposition, received over 20 million visitors and added $3.7 billion to the Canadian economy. Some still-standing Vancouver landmarks, including the SkyTrain public transit system and Canada Place, were built as part of the exposition.

== Government ==
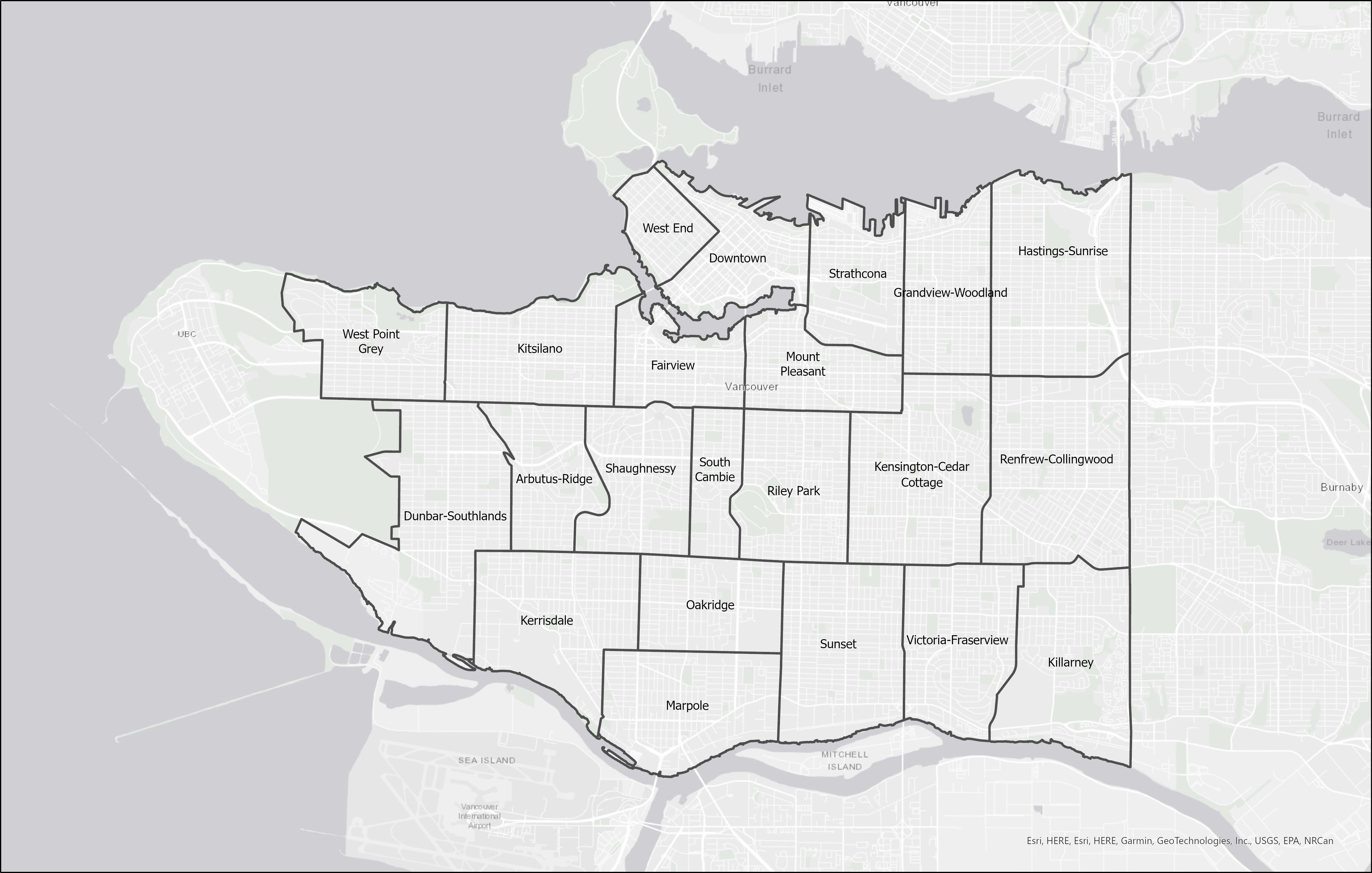
Map of the 22 official neighbourhoods of Vancouver

Vancouver, unlike other British Columbia municipalities, is incorporated under the Vancouver Charter. The legislation, passed in 1953, supersedes the Vancouver Incorporation Act, 1921 and grants the city more and different powers than other communities possess under British Columbia's Municipalities Act.

The civic government was dominated by the centre-right Non-Partisan Association (NPA) since World War II, albeit with some significant centre-left interludes until 2008. The NPA fractured over the issue of drug policy in 2002, facilitating a landslide victory for the Coalition of Progressive Electors (COPE) on a harm reduction platform. Subsequently, North America's only legal safe injection site at the time, Insite, was opened for the significant number of intravenous heroin users in the city.

Vancouver is governed by the eleven-member Vancouver City Council, a nine-member School Board, and a seven-member Park Board, all of whom serve four-year terms. Unusually for a city of Vancouver's size, all municipal elections are on an at-large basis. Historically, in all levels of government, the more affluent west side of Vancouver has voted along conservative or liberal lines. In contrast, the city's eastern side has voted along left-wing lines. This was reaffirmed with the results of the 2005 provincial election and the 2006 federal election.

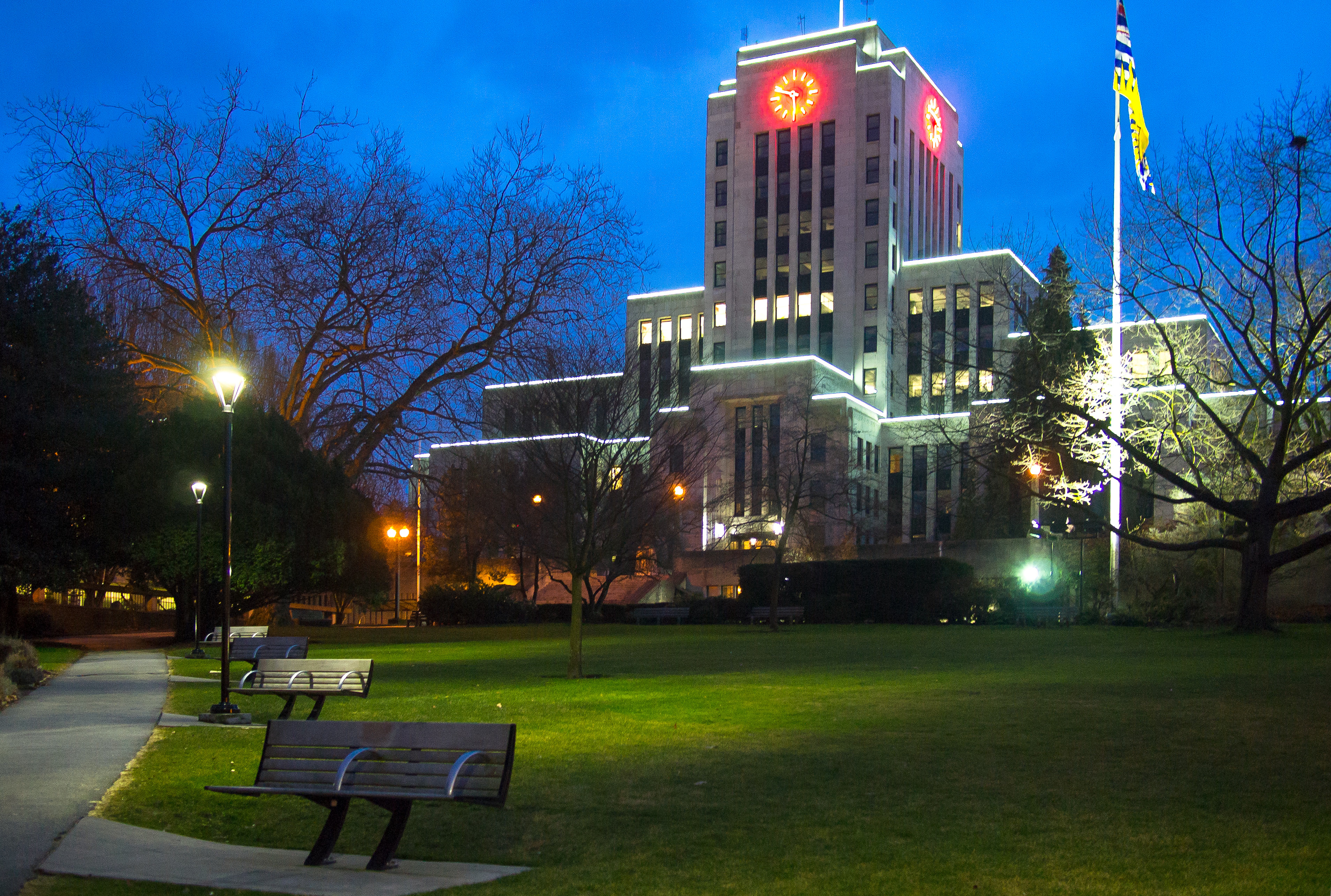
Opened in 1936, Vancouver City Hall is home to Vancouver City Council.

Though polarized, a political consensus has emerged in Vancouver around several issues. Protection of urban parks, a focus on the development of rapid transit as opposed to a freeway system, a harm-reduction approach to illegal drug use, and a general concern about community-based development are examples of policies that have come to have broad support across the political spectrum in Vancouver.

In the 2008 municipal election campaign, NPA incumbent mayor Sam Sullivan was ousted as mayoral candidate by the party in a close vote, which instated Peter Ladner as the new mayoral candidate for the NPA. Gregor Robertson, a former MLA for Vancouver-Fairview and head of Happy Planet, was the mayoral candidate for Vision Vancouver, the other main contender. Vision Vancouver candidate Gregor Robertson defeated Ladner by a considerable margin, nearing 20,000 votes. The balance of power was significantly shifted to Vision Vancouver, which held seven of the ten spots for councillor. Of the remaining three, COPE received two and the NPA one. For park commissioner, four seats went to Vision Vancouver, one to the Green Party, one to COPE, and one to NPA. For school trustees, there were four Vision Vancouver seats, three COPE seats, and two NPA seats. In the 2018 Vancouver municipal election, independent Kennedy Stewart was elected mayor of Vancouver. Stewart was later defeated as mayor in the 2022 Vancouver municipal election by Ken Sim, the runner-up in the 2018 election.

Vancouver's budget consists of a capital and an operating component. In 2023, the operating budget was $1.97 billion, with a 5-year financial plan, developed in 2022, that projected the budget would increase to $2.46 billion by 2027. The 2023 capital budget was $580 million, with a 2023 to 2026 Capital Plan that anticipates $3.5 billion in expenditures in those four years. Budget increases are primarily funded through increases in property taxes and community amenity contributions imposed in exchange for increases in allowable density as part of the construction permitting process. Utility and other user fees have also been increased but represent a small portion of Vancouver's overall budget.

=== Regional government ===
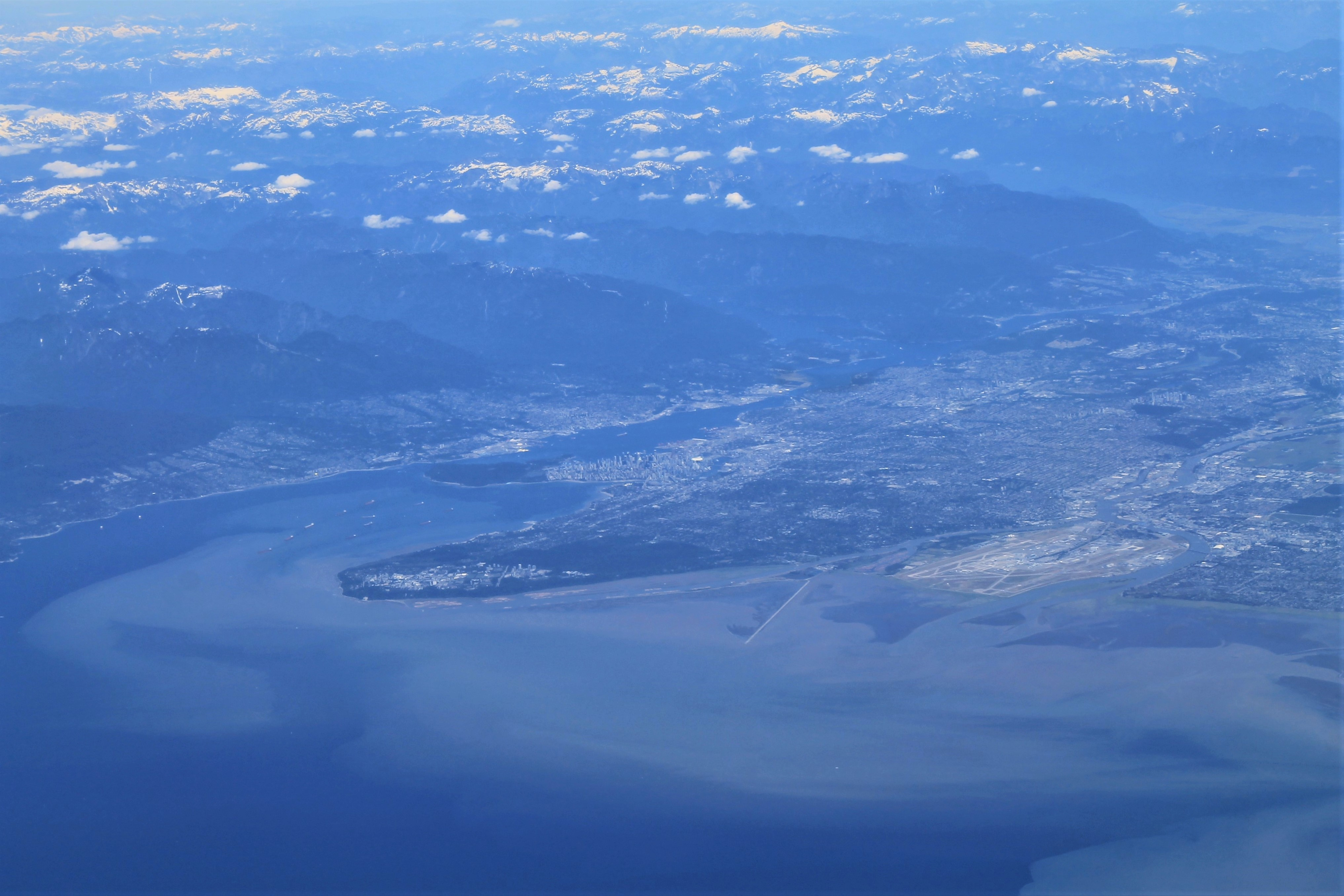
Aerial view of Greater Vancouver from the west, 2018

Along with 20 other municipalities, one electoral area and one treaty First Nation, Vancouver is a member municipality of Metro Vancouver, the regional government whose seat is in Burnaby. While each member of Metro Vancouver has its own separate local governing body, Metro Vancouver oversees standard services and planning functions within the area, such as providing drinking water; operating sewage and solid waste handling; maintaining regional parks; managing air quality, greenhouse gases and ecological health; and providing a strategy for regional growth and land use.

=== Provincial and federal representation ===
In the Legislative Assembly of British Columbia, Vancouver is represented by 12 members of the Legislative Assembly (MLAs). As of 2025, the 2024 general election saw eleven seats go to the BC New Democratic Party and one seat go to the BC Conservatives.

In the House of Commons of Canada as of 2025, Vancouver is represented by seven members of Parliament. In the 2025 federal election, the Liberals held three seats (Vancouver Quadra, Vancouver Centre, and Vancouver Granville) and won the newly created district of Vancouver Fraserview—South Burnaby, while the NDP held on to two seats (Vancouver East and Vancouver Kingsway). The Conservatives gained the newly created district of Richmond Centre—Marpole.

=== Policing and crime ===
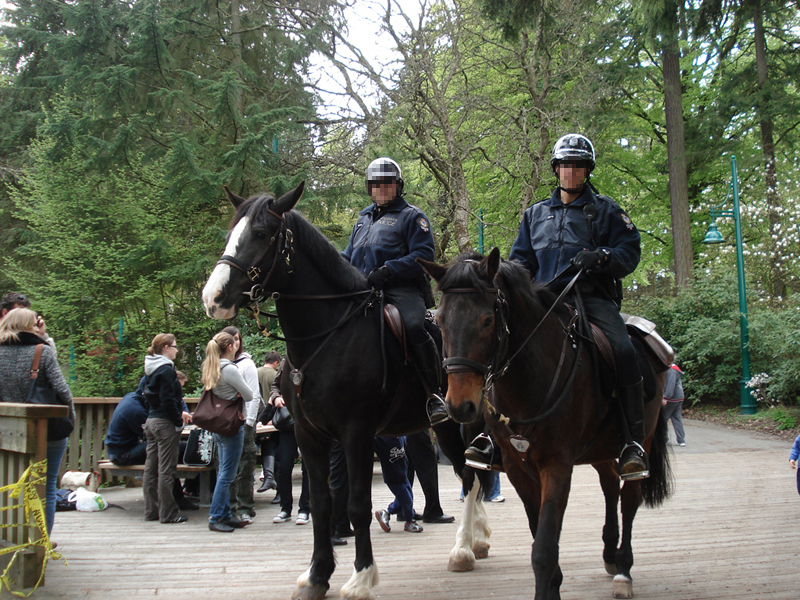
Mounted officers of the Vancouver Police Department in Stanley Park

Vancouver operates the Vancouver Police Department, with 1,327 sworn members and an operating budget of $316.5 million in 2018. Over 19 percent of the city's budget was spent on police protection in 2018 and by 2023 that has increased to 20.2 percent.

The Vancouver Police Department's operational divisions include a bicycle squad, a marine squad, and a dog squad. It also has a mounted squad, used primarily to patrol Stanley Park and for crowd control. The police work in conjunction with civilian and volunteer-run Community Police Centres. In 2006, the police department established its own counterterrorism unit. In 2005, a new transit police force, the Greater Vancouver Transportation Authority Police Service (now the Metro Vancouver Transit Police), was established with full police powers.

Before the legalization of marijuana, Vancouver police generally did not arrest people for possessing small amounts of marijuana. In 2000, the Vancouver Police Department established a specialized drug squad, "Growbusters", to carry out an aggressive campaign against the city's estimated 4,000 hydroponic marijuana growing operations (or grow-ops) in residential areas. As with other law enforcement campaigns targeting marijuana this initiative has been sharply criticized.

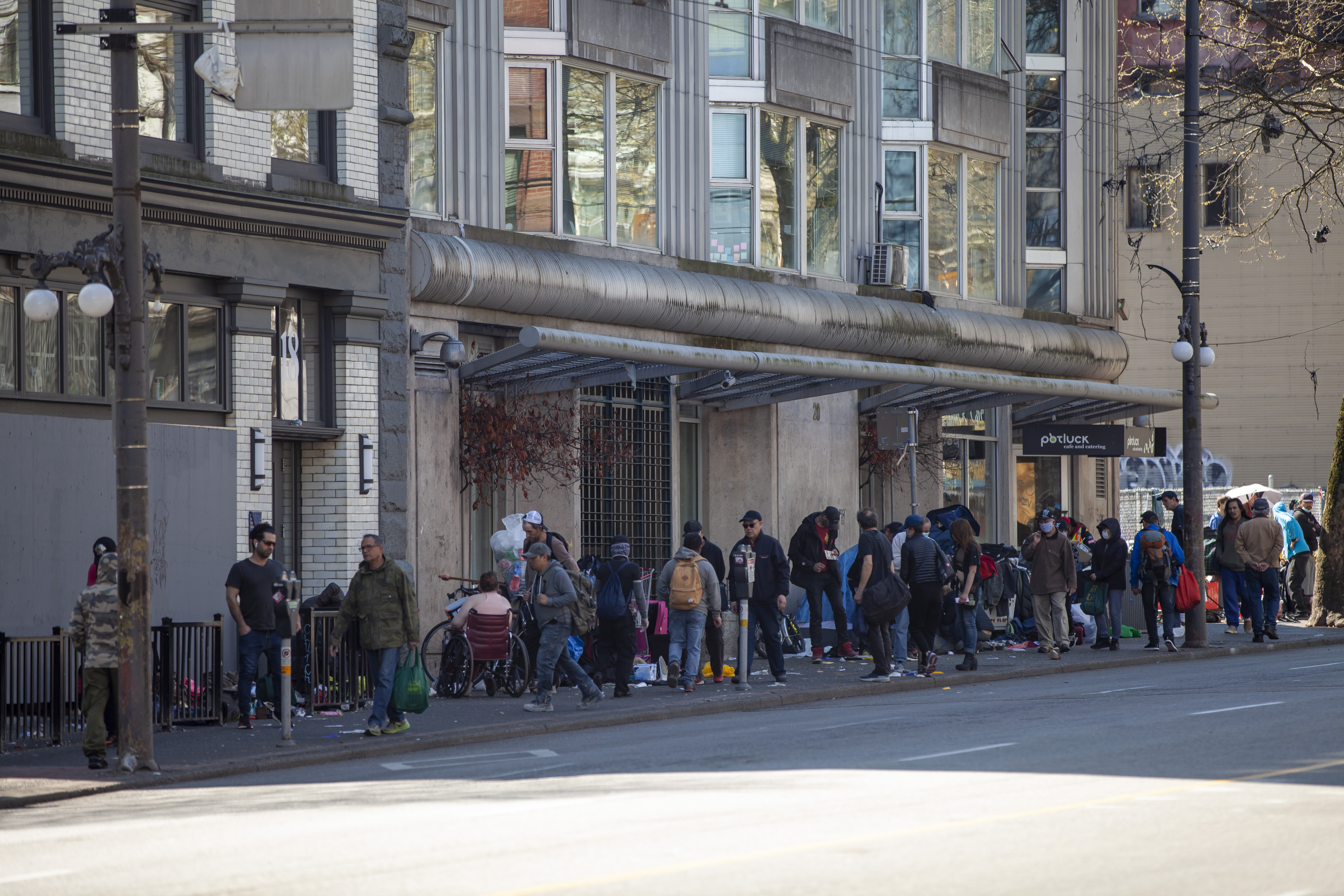
For decades, the Downtown Eastside area of Vancouver has faced a complex set of social issues, including disproportionately high levels of drug use, homelessness, poverty, crime, and mental illness.

Since 1982, when Vancouver's homicide rate peaked at around 9.6 per 100,000 people with a total of 40 murders, the city's overall crime rate has declined, with a few notable exceptions, one being in 1991, when the city surpassed its homicide record with 41 being reported, giving the city a slightly lower homicide rate of 8.7 per 100,000 residents than its peak. However, in 2013, Vancouver reached a record low 6 murders, resulting in a homicide rate of 1 per 100,000 residents. As of 2018, Vancouver had the ninth-highest crime rate, dropping five spots since 2005, among Canada's 35 census metropolitan areas. As with other Canadian cities, the overall crime rate has been falling "dramatically". The rate of firearm related violence dropped from 45.3 per 100,000 in 2006, the highest of any major metropolitan region in Canada at that time, to 16.2 in 2017. A series of gang-related incidents in early 2009 escalated into what police dubbed a gang war.

Vancouver plays host to special events, such as the Asia-Pacific Economic Cooperation conference, the Clinton-Yeltsin Summit, and the Symphony of Fire fireworks show that require significant policing. The 1994 Stanley Cup riot overwhelmed police and injured as many as 200 people. A second riot took place following the 2011 Stanley Cup Finals.

To reduce the public health risk from discarded hypodermic needles commonly found on downtown and the adjacent Downtown Eastside streets, the city runs a continuous collection effort, recovering approximately 1000 needles per day from public spaces. According to Vancouver Coastal Health, the regional health authority and a distributor of clean needles to intravenous drug users, there has never been a documented case of disease transmission from an accidental needlestick.

=== Military ===
Jericho Beach in Vancouver is the location of the headquarters of 39 Canadian Brigade Group of the Canadian Army. Local primary reserve units include The Seaforth Highlanders of Canada and The British Columbia Regiment (Duke of Connaught's Own), based at the Seaforth Armoury and the Beatty Street Drill Hall, respectively, and the 15th Field Regiment, Royal Canadian Artillery. The Naval Reserve Unit HMCS Discovery is based on Deadman's Island in Stanley Park. RCAF Station Jericho Beach, the first air base in Western Canada, was taken over by the Canadian Army in 1947 when seaplanes were replaced by long-range aircraft. Most of the base facilities were transferred to the City of Vancouver in 1969, and the area was renamed "Jericho Park".

== Education ==
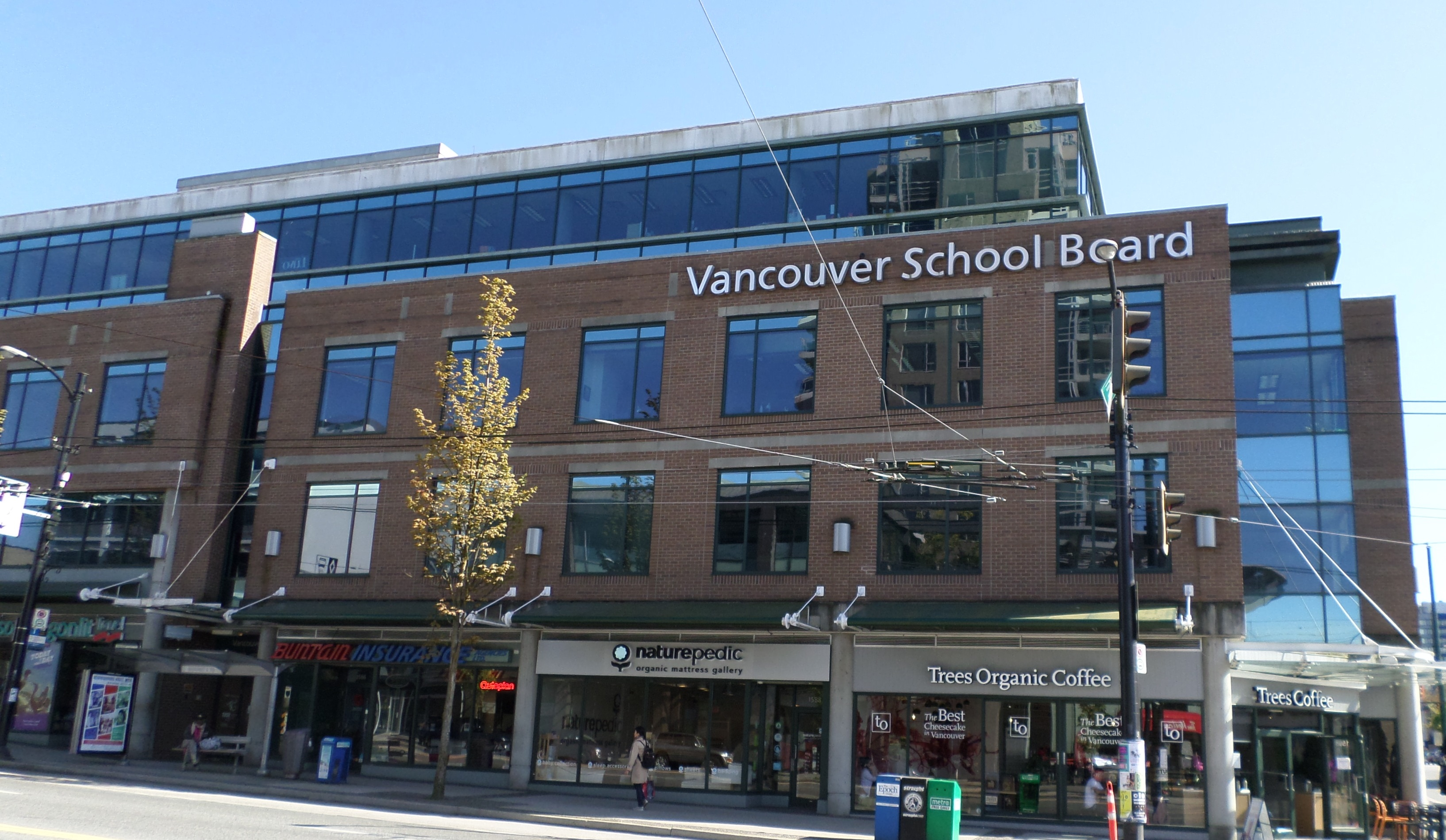
Headquarters of the Vancouver School Board. The English-language school district serves Vancouver, UBC and the University Endowment Lands.

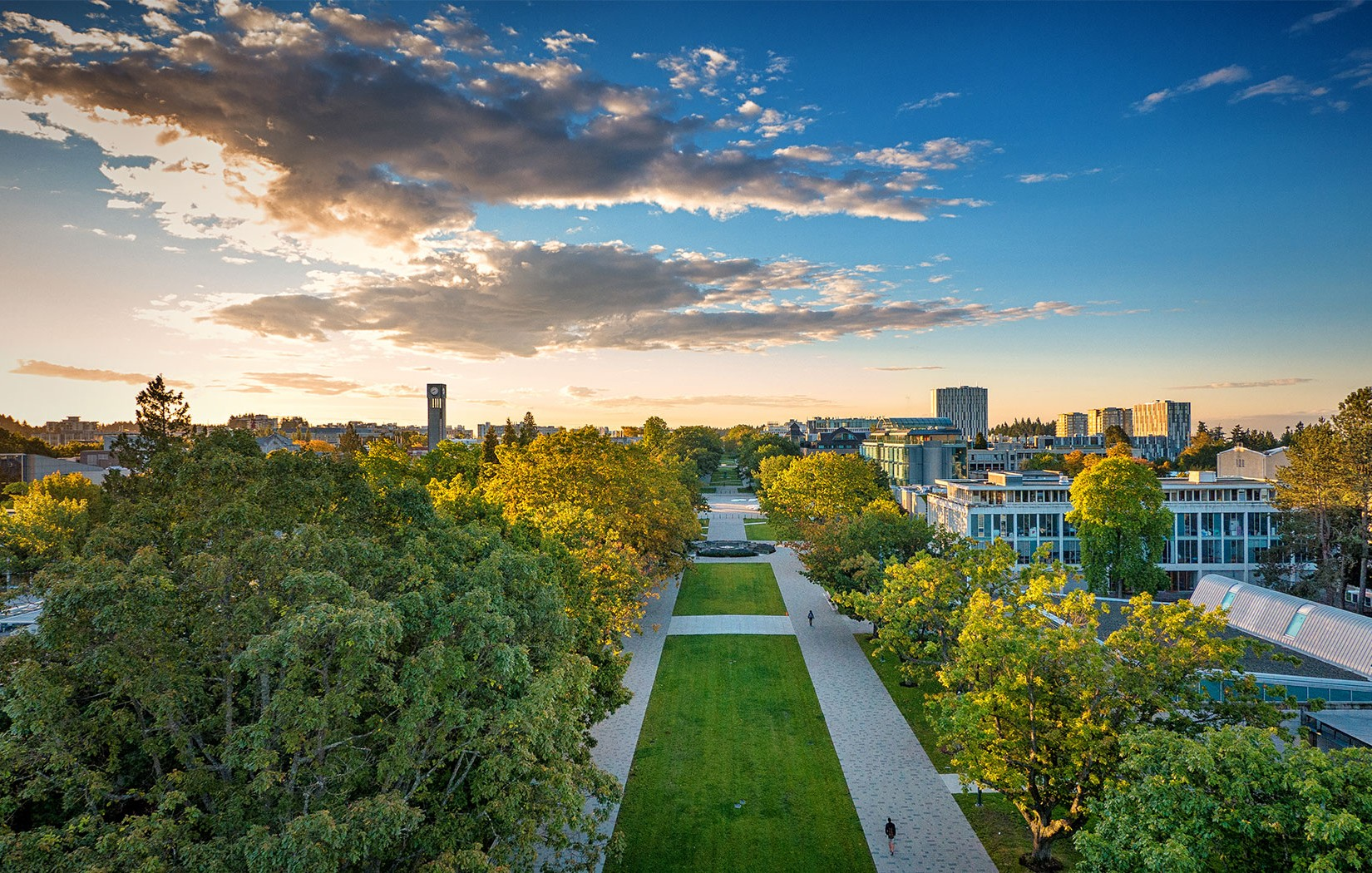
Main mall of the University of British Columbia (UBC). UBC is one of five public universities located in Vancouver.

The Vancouver School Board enrols more than 110,000 students in its elementary, secondary, and post-secondary institutions, making it the second-largest school district in the province. The district administers about 76 elementary schools, 17 elementary annexes, 18 secondary schools, 7 adult education centres, 2 Vancouver Learning Network schools, which include 18 French immersion schools, a Mandarin bilingual school, and fine arts (Byng Arts Mini School), gifted, and Montessori schools. The Conseil scolaire francophone de la Colombie-Britannique operates three Francophone schools in that city: the primary schools école Rose-des-vents and école Anne-Hébert as well as the école secondaire Jules-Verne. More than 46 independent schools of a wide variety are also eligible for partial provincial funding and educate approximately 10 percent of pupils in the city.

There are five public universities in the Greater Vancouver area, the largest and most prestigious being the University of British Columbia (UBC) and Simon Fraser University (SFU), with a combined enrolment of more than 90,000 undergraduates, graduates, and professional students in 2008. UBC often ranks among the top 40 best universities in the world and is ranked among the 3 best universities in Canada. SFU consistently ranks as the top comprehensive university in Canada and is among the 350 best universities in the world. UBC's main campus is located on the tip of Burrard Peninsula, on the Point Grey campus lands just west of the University Endowment Lands with the city-proper adjacent to the east. SFU's main campus is in Burnaby. Both also maintain campuses in Downtown Vancouver and the southeastern suburban city of Surrey.

The other public universities in the metropolitan area around Vancouver are Capilano University in North Vancouver, Emily Carr University of Art and Design, and Kwantlen Polytechnic University, whose four campuses are all outside the city proper. Six private institutions also operate in the region: Trinity Western University in Langley, UOPX Canada in Burnaby, and University Canada West, NYIT Canada, Fairleigh Dickinson University, Columbia College, and Sprott Shaw College, all in Vancouver.

Vancouver Community College and Langara College are publicly funded college-level institutions in Vancouver, as is Douglas College with three campuses outside the city. The British Columbia Institute of Technology in Burnaby provides polytechnic education. These are augmented by private and vocational institutions and other colleges in the surrounding areas of Metro Vancouver that provide career, trade, technical, and university-transfer programs. In contrast, the Vancouver Film School and InFocus Film School provide one-year programs in film production, animation, and other entertainment arts.

International students and English as a second language (ESL) students have been significant in the enrolment of these public and private institutions. For the 2008–2009 school year, 53 percent of Vancouver School Board's students spoke a language other than English at home.

== Arts and culture ==
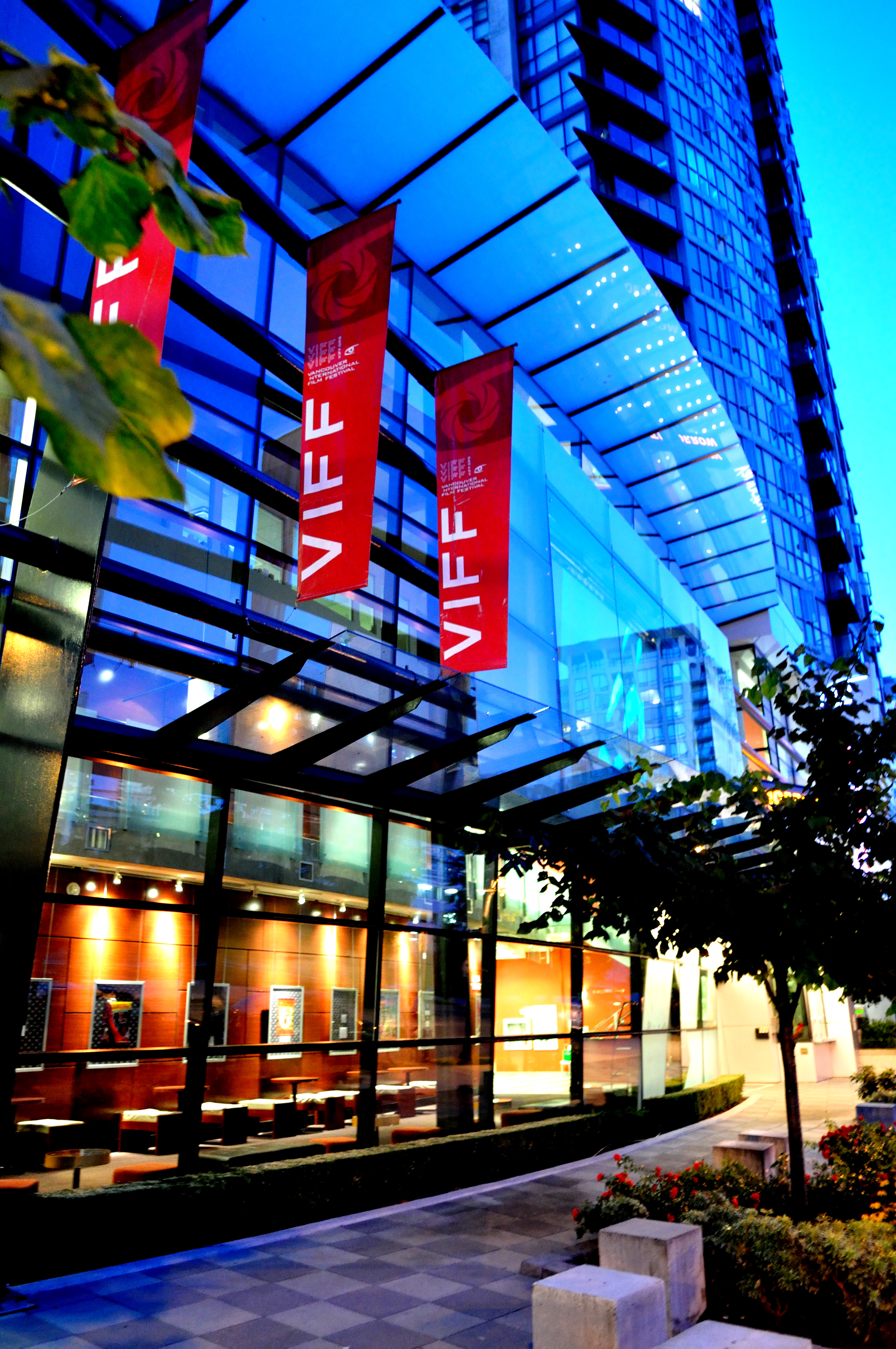
Opened in 2005, VIFF Centre houses production rooms and offices for the Vancouver International Film Festival.

=== Theatre, dance, film and television ===
==== Theatre ====
Prominent theatre companies in Vancouver include the Arts Club Theatre Company, which operates three venues, including one on Granville Island, and Bard on the Beach, a large summer Shakespeare festival. Smaller professional companies include Touchstone Theatre, the Cultch, Pacific Theatre, and Firehall Arts Centre. Non-professional theatre organizations include United Players and Metro Theatre, and Theatre Under the Stars, which produces musicals in the summer at Malkin Bowl in Stanley Park. Annual festivals held in Vancouver include the PuSh International Performing Arts Festival in January and the Vancouver Fringe Festival in September.

The Vancouver Playhouse Theatre Company operated for fifty years, ending in March 2012.

==== Dance ====
Vancouver is home to Ballet BC, a ballet company whose principal venue is the Queen Elizabeth Theatre. Ballet BC was founded in 1986 and is British Columbia's only ballet company.

The Scotiabank Dance Centre, a converted bank building on the corner of Davie and Granville, functions as a gathering place and performance venue for Vancouver-based dancers and choreographers. Dances for a Small Stage is a semi-annual dance festival.

==== Film ====
The Vancouver International Film Festival, which runs for two weeks each September, shows over 350 films and is one of North America's most prominent film festivals. The VIFF Centre venue runs independent non-commercial films throughout the rest of the year, as do the Cinematheque and the Rio theatres.

Vancouver has become a significant film location, known as Hollywood North, as it has stood in for several U.S. cities. However, it has started to appear as itself in several feature films. Among films set in the city and its surroundings are the 1994 US thriller Intersection, starring Richard Gere and Sharon Stone; the 2007 Canadian ghost thriller They Wait, starring Terry Chen and Jaime King; and the acclaimed Canadian 'mockumentary' Hard Core Logo, and was named the second-best Canadian film of the last 15 years, in a 2001 poll of 200 industry voters, performed by Playback. Genie Award-winning filmmaker Mina Shum has filmed and set several of her internationally released features in Vancouver, including the Sundance-screened Long Life, Happiness & Prosperity (2002).

==== Television shows produced in Vancouver ====
Many past and current TV shows have been filmed and set in Vancouver. The first Canadian prime time national series to be produced out of Vancouver was Cold Squad and its storyline was also physically set in the city. Other series set in or around the city of Vancouver include Continuum, Da Vinci's Inquest, Danger Bay, Edgemont, Godiva's, Intelligence, Motive, Northwood, Primeval: New World, Robson Arms, The Romeo Section, Shattered, The Switch, and These Arms of Mine.

Television shows produced (but not set) in Vancouver (that have been produced by American and Canadian studios alike) include 21 Jump Street, The 100, The 4400, Airwolf, Almost Human, Arrow, Backstrom, Caprica, Cedar Cove, Chesapeake Shores, Chilling Adventures of Sabrina, The Commish, Dark Angel, Dirk Gently's Holistic Detective Agency, The Flash, The Good Doctor, Haters Back Off, Hellcats, Intelligence, iZombie, The Killing, The L Word, The Last of Us, Life Unexpected, The Man in the High Castle, My Little Pony: Friendship Is Magic, Motherland: Fort Salem, Once Upon a Time, Psych, Reaper, Riverdale, Rogue, Smallville, Stargate SG-1, Supergirl, Supernatural, The Tomorrow People, The Magicians, Tru Calling, Van Helsing, Wild Cards, Witches of East End, and The X-Files.

=== Libraries and museums ===
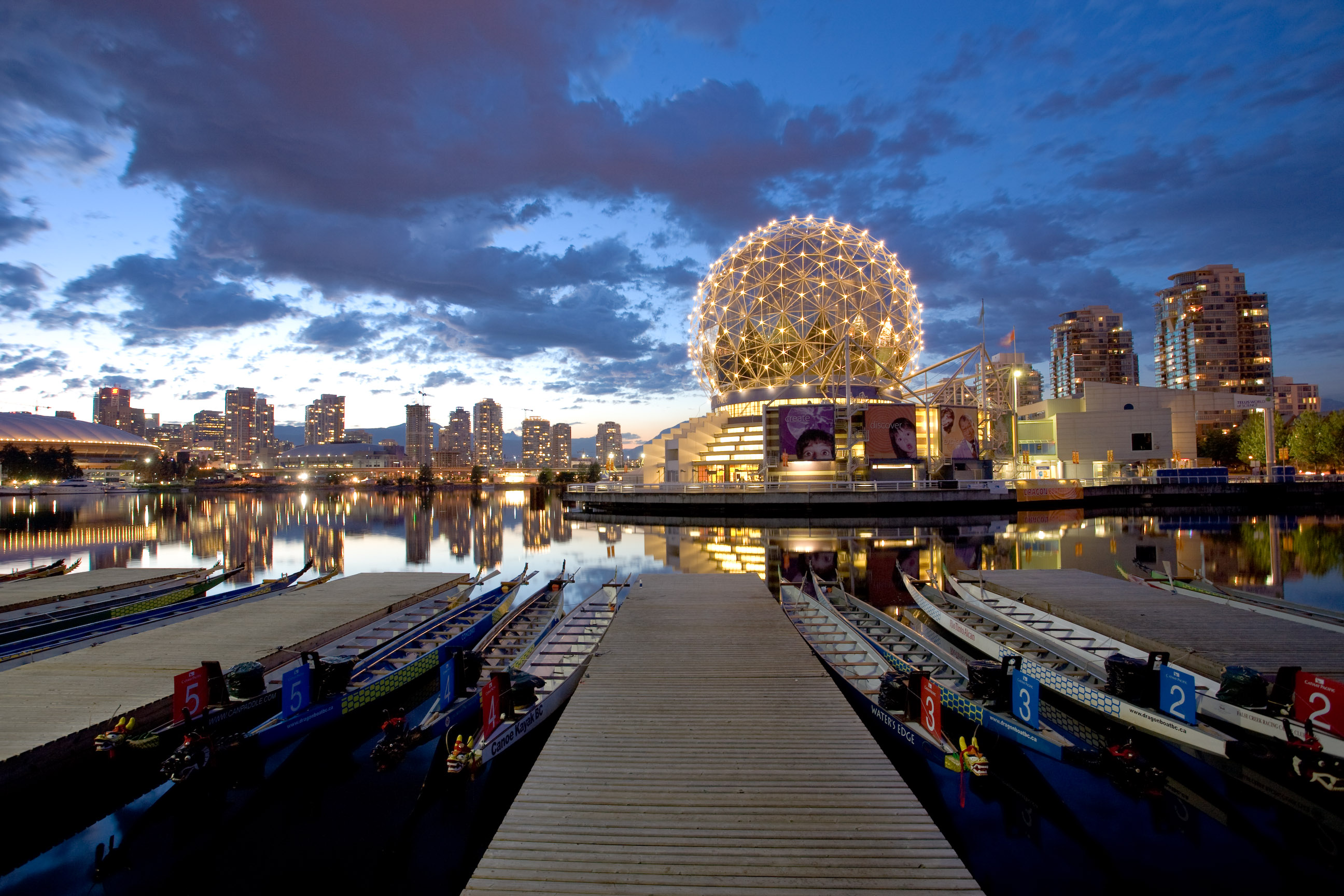
Science World is an interactive science centre. The building was originally constructed for Expo 86.

Libraries in Vancouver include the Vancouver Public Library, with its main branch at Library Square, designed by Moshe Safdie. The central branch contains 1.5 million volumes. Altogether, twenty-two branches contain 2.25 million volumes. The Vancouver Tool Library is Canada's original tool lending library.

The Vancouver Art Gallery has a permanent collection of nearly 10,000 items and is the home of a significant number of works by Emily Carr. However, little or none of the permanent collection is ever on view. Downtown is also home to the Contemporary Art Gallery (Vancouver), which showcases temporary exhibitions by up-and-coming Vancouver artists. The Morris and Helen Belkin Art Gallery, with a small collection of contemporary works, is part of the University of British Columbia.

In the Kitsilano district are the Vancouver Maritime Museum, the H. R. MacMillan Space Centre, and the Vancouver Museum, the largest civic museum in Canada. The Museum of Anthropology at UBC is a leading museum of Pacific Northwest Coast First Nations culture. A more interactive museum is Science World at the head of False Creek. The city also features a diverse collection of Public Art.

=== Visual art ===
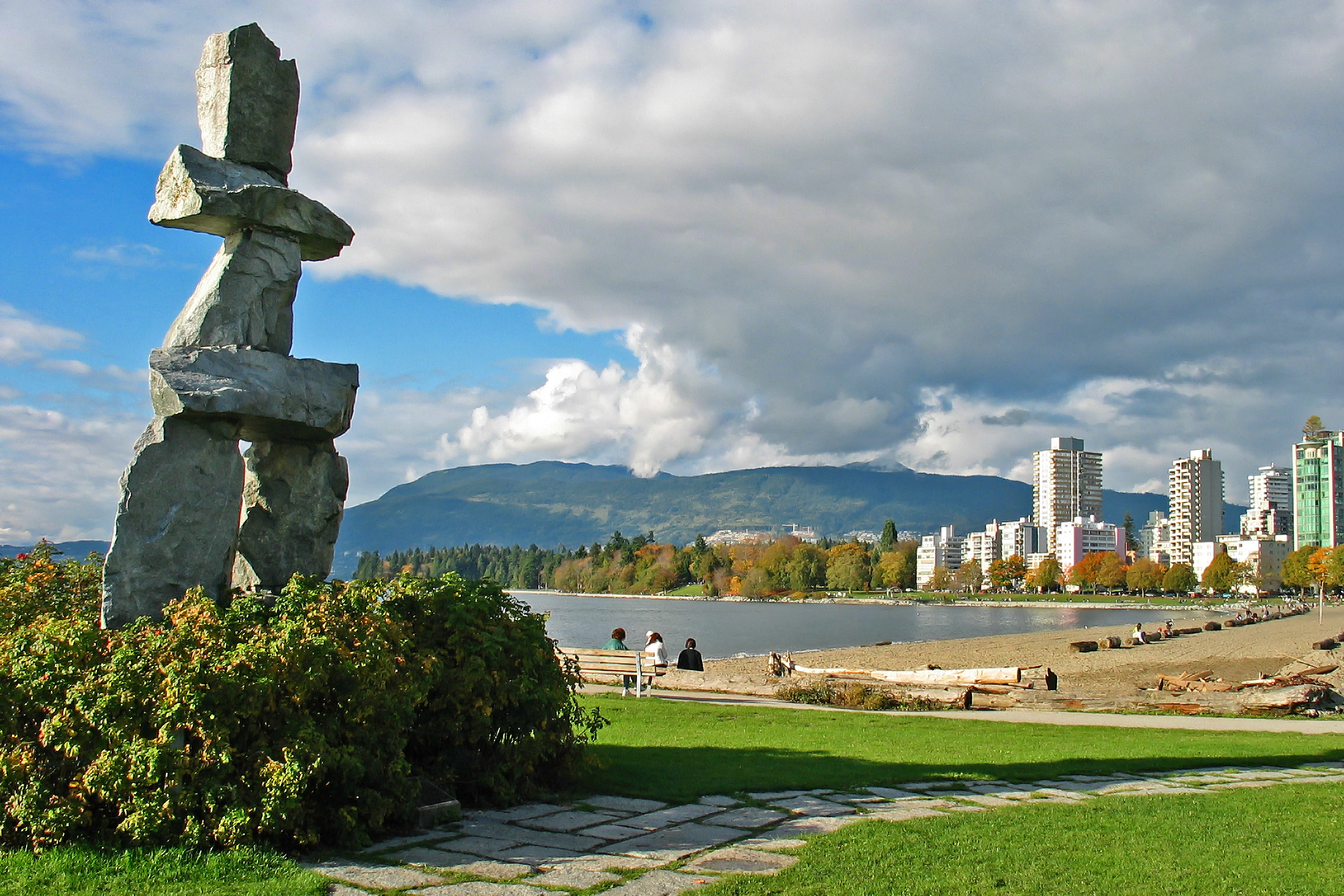
Inukshuk at English Bay. The inuksuk sculpture is one of several pieces of public art on display in Vancouver.

Vancouver is home to 13 of the 190 Artist Run Centres in Canada. Artwork and cultural artifacts from nations indigenous to the land on which Vancouver is located are available to view at the Museum of Anthropology at UBC.

=== Music and nightlife ===
Musical contributions from Vancouver include performers of classical, folk and popular music. The Vancouver Symphony Orchestra is the professional orchestra based in the city. The Vancouver Opera is a major opera company in the city, and City Opera of Vancouver is the city's professional chamber opera company. The city is home to several Canadian composers, including Rodney Sharman, Jeffrey Ryan, and Jocelyn Morlock.

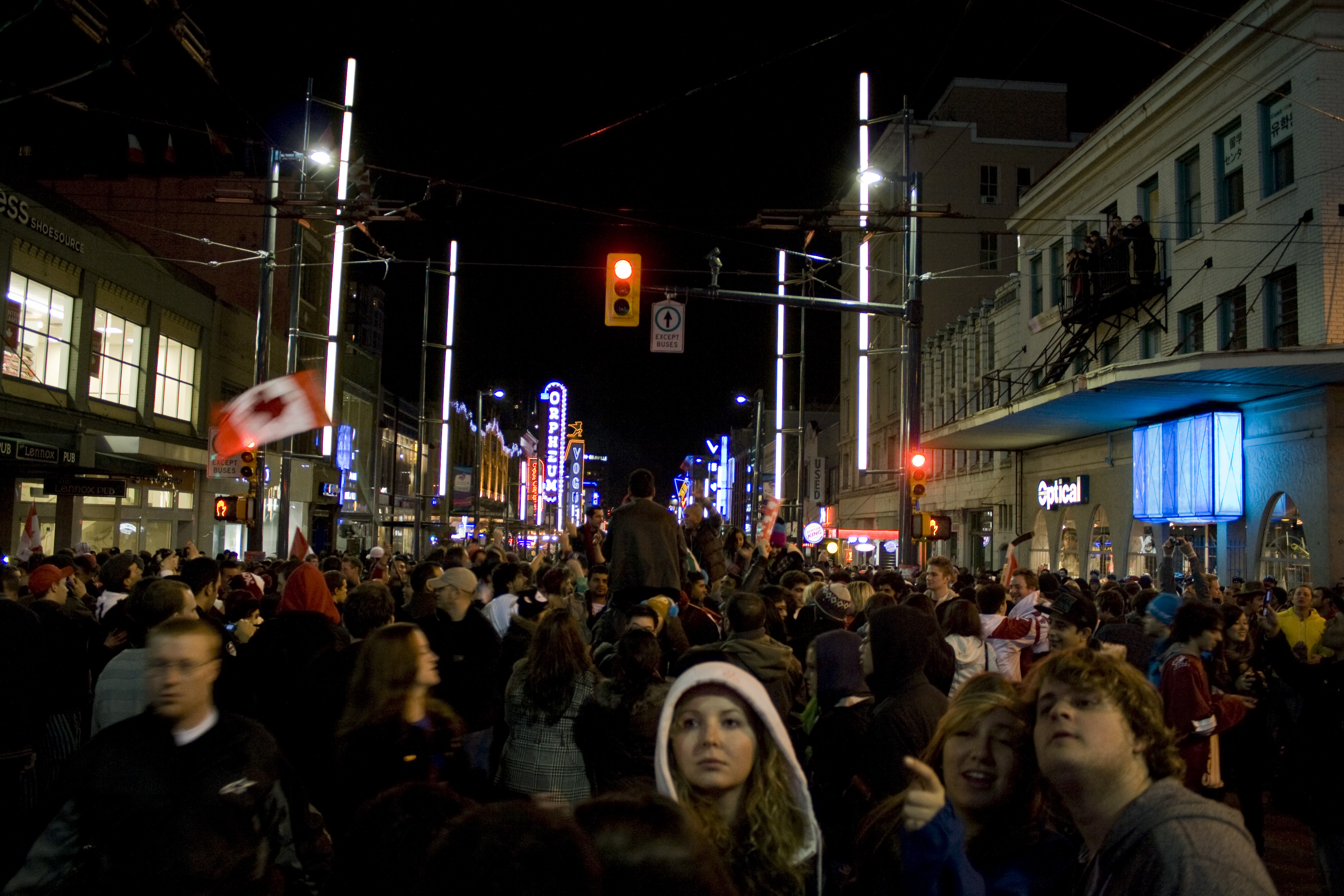
The Granville Entertainment District, downtown, can attract large crowds to the street's many bars and nightclubs.

The city produced a number of notable punk rock bands, including D.O.A. Other early Vancouver punk bands included the Subhumans, the Young Canadians, the Pointed Sticks, and U-J3RK5. When alternative rock became popular in the 1990s, several Vancouver groups rose to prominence, including 54-40, Odds, Moist, the Matthew Good Band, Sons of Freedom and Econoline Crush. Recent successful Vancouver bands include Gob, Marianas Trench, Theory of a Deadman and Stabilo. Today, Vancouver is home to several popular independent bands such as The New Pornographers, Japandroids, Destroyer, In Medias Res, Tegan and Sara, and independent labels including Nettwerk and Mint. Vancouver also produced influential metal band Strapping Young Lad and pioneering electro-industrial bands Skinny Puppy, Numb and Front Line Assembly; the latter's Bill Leeb is better known for founding ambient pop super-group Delerium. Other popular musical artists who made their mark from Vancouver include Carly Rae Jepsen, Bryan Adams, Sarah McLachlan, Heart, Prism, Trooper, Chilliwack, Payolas, Moev, Images in Vogue, Michael Bublé, Stef Lang and Spirit of the West.

More significant musical performances are usually held at venues such as Rogers Arena, Queen Elizabeth Theatre, BC Place Stadium or the Pacific Coliseum. In contrast, more minor acts are held at places such as the Commodore Ballroom, the Orpheum Theatre and the Vogue Theatre. The Vancouver Folk Music Festival and the Vancouver International Jazz Festival showcase music from around the world in their respective genres. Vancouver's Hong Kong Chinese population has produced several Cantopop stars across the Hong Kong entertainment industry. Similarly, various Indo-Canadian artists and actors have a profile in Bollywood or other aspects of India's entertainment industry.

Vancouver has a vibrant nightlife scene, whether food and dining or bars and nightclubs. The Granville Entertainment District has the city's highest concentration of bars and nightclubs with closing times of 3 am, in addition to various after-hours clubs open until late morning on weekends. The street can attract large crowds on weekends and is closed to traffic on such nights. Gastown is also a popular area for nightlife with many upscale restaurants and nightclubs, as well as the Davie Village, which is the centre of the city's LGBT community.

== Media ==
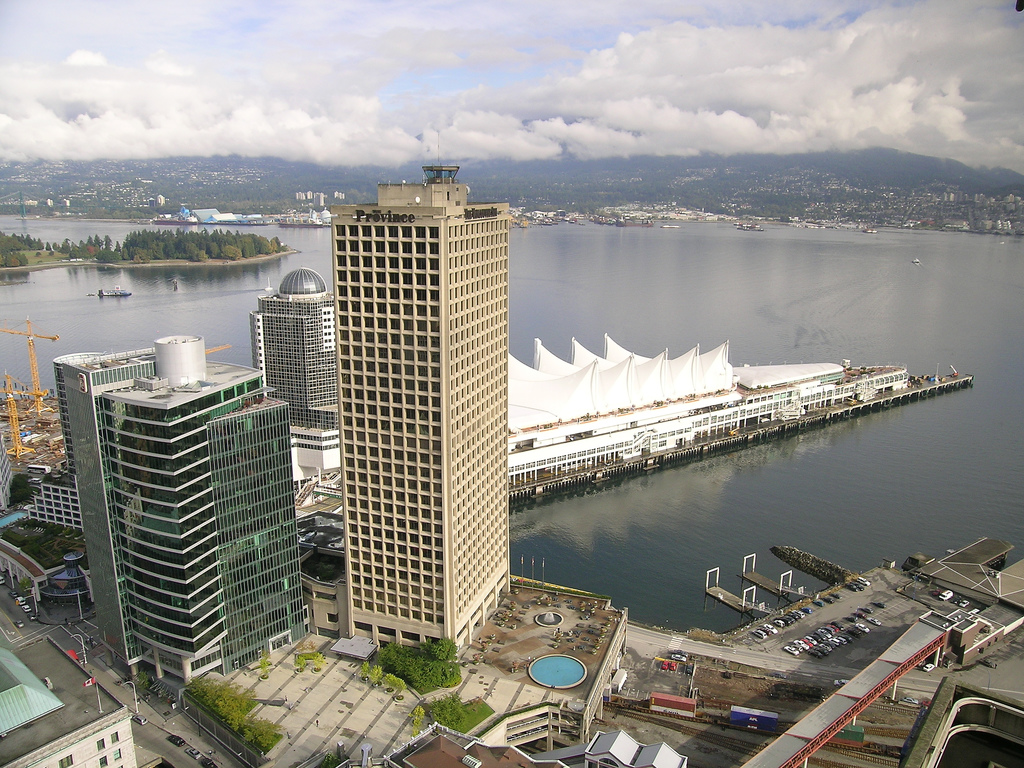
Granville Square (centre building) houses the two major daily newspapers of the city, The Vancouver Sun and The Province.

Vancouver is a centre for film and television production. Nicknamed Hollywood North, a distinction it shares with Toronto, the city has been used as a film making location for nearly a century, beginning with the Edison Manufacturing Company. In 2021, $3.6 billion was spent on film production in Vancouver. This ranks Vancouver as the largest production hub in Canada and the 3rd largest in North America, behind Los Angeles and New York City.

A wide mix of local, national, and international newspapers are distributed in the city. The two major English-language daily newspapers are the Vancouver Sun and The Province. Also, there are two national newspapers distributed in the city, including The Globe and Mail, which began publication of a "national edition" in BC in 1983 and recently expanded to include a three-page BC news section, and the National Post, which centres on national news. Other local newspapers have included 24H (a local free daily), the Vancouver franchise of the national free daily Metro, the twice-a-week Vancouver Courier, and the independent newspaper The Georgia Straight. Three Chinese-language daily newspapers – Ming Pao, Sing Tao and World Journal – cater to the city's large Cantonese- and Mandarin-speaking population. Several other local and international papers serve other multicultural groups in the Lower Mainland.

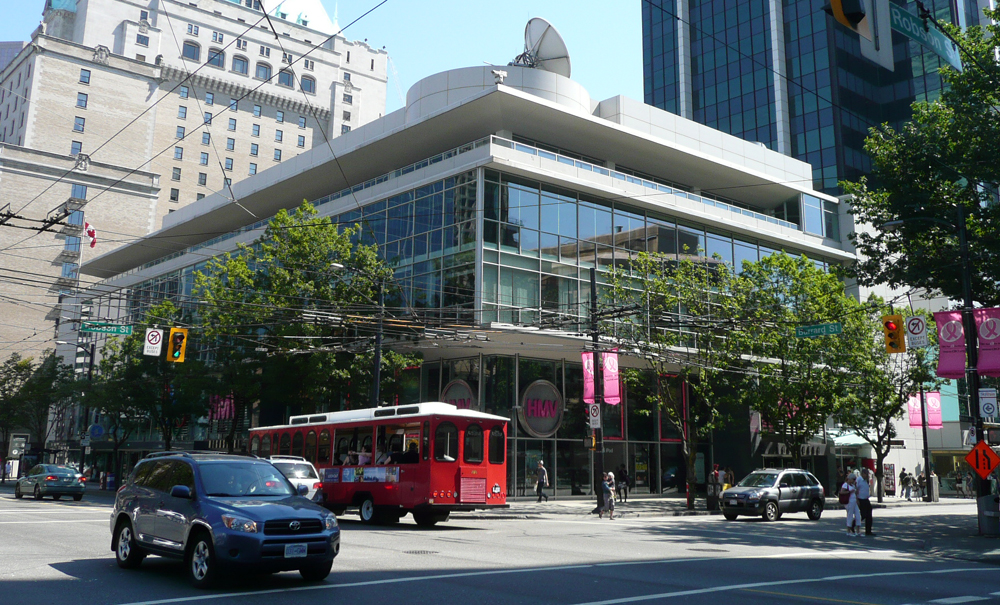
750 Burrard Street houses Bell Media's West Coast headquarters and the regional offices for The Globe and Mail.

Some of the local television stations include CBC, Citytv, CTV and Global BC. OMNI British Columbia produces daily newscasts in Cantonese, Mandarin, Punjabi and Korean, and weekly newscasts in Tagalog, as well as programs aimed at other cultural groups. Fairchild Group also has two television stations: Fairchild TV and Talentvision, serving Cantonese- and Mandarin-speaking audiences, respectively.

Radio stations with news departments include CBC Radio One, CKNW and News 1130. The Franco-Columbian community is served by Radio-Canada outlets CBUFT-DT channel 26 (Ici Radio-Canada Télé), CBUF-FM 97.7 (Première Chaîne) and CBUX-FM 90.9 (Espace musique). The multilingual South Asian community is served by Spice Radio on 1200 AM, which was established in 2014.

Media dominance is a frequently discussed issue in Vancouver as newspapers the Vancouver Sun, The Province, the Vancouver Courier and other local newspapers such as the Surrey Now, the Burnaby Now and the Richmond News, are all owned by Postmedia Network. The concentration of media ownership has spurred alternatives, making Vancouver a centre for independent online media including The Tyee, The Vancouver Observer, and NowPublic, as well as hyperlocal online media, like Daily Hive and Vancouver Is Awesome, which provide coverage of community events and local arts and culture.

== Transportation ==
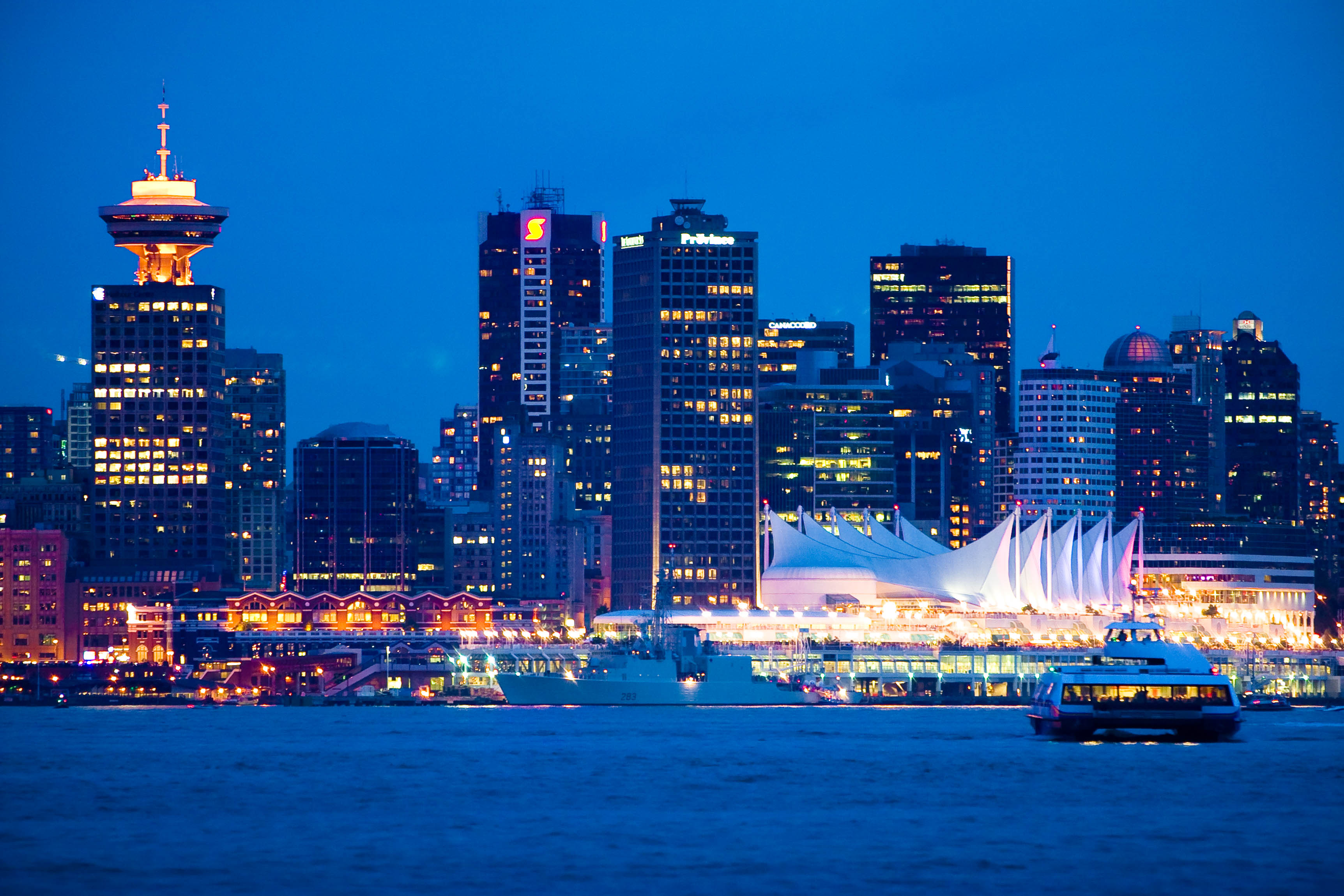
A SeaBus crosses Burrard Inlet between Vancouver and the neighbouring city of North Vancouver.

Vancouver's streetcar system began on June 28, 1890, and ran from the (first) Granville Street Bridge to Westminster Avenue (now Main Street and Kingsway). Less than a year later, the Westminster and Vancouver Tramway Company began operating Canada's first interurban line between the two cities (extended to Chilliwack in 1910). Another line (1902), the Vancouver and Lulu Island Railway, was leased by the Canadian Pacific Railway to the British Columbia Electric Railway in 1905 and ran from the Granville Street Bridge to Steveston via Kerrisdale, which encouraged residential neighbourhoods outside the central core to develop. After 1897, the British Columbia Electric Railway (BCER) became the operator of the urban and interurban rail systems until 1958, when its remaining lines were dismantled in favour of trackless electric trolleys and gasoline or diesel buses. BCER later became the core of the newly created, publicly owned BC Hydro, established in 1962. Vancouver currently has the second-largest trolleybus fleet in North America, after San Francisco.

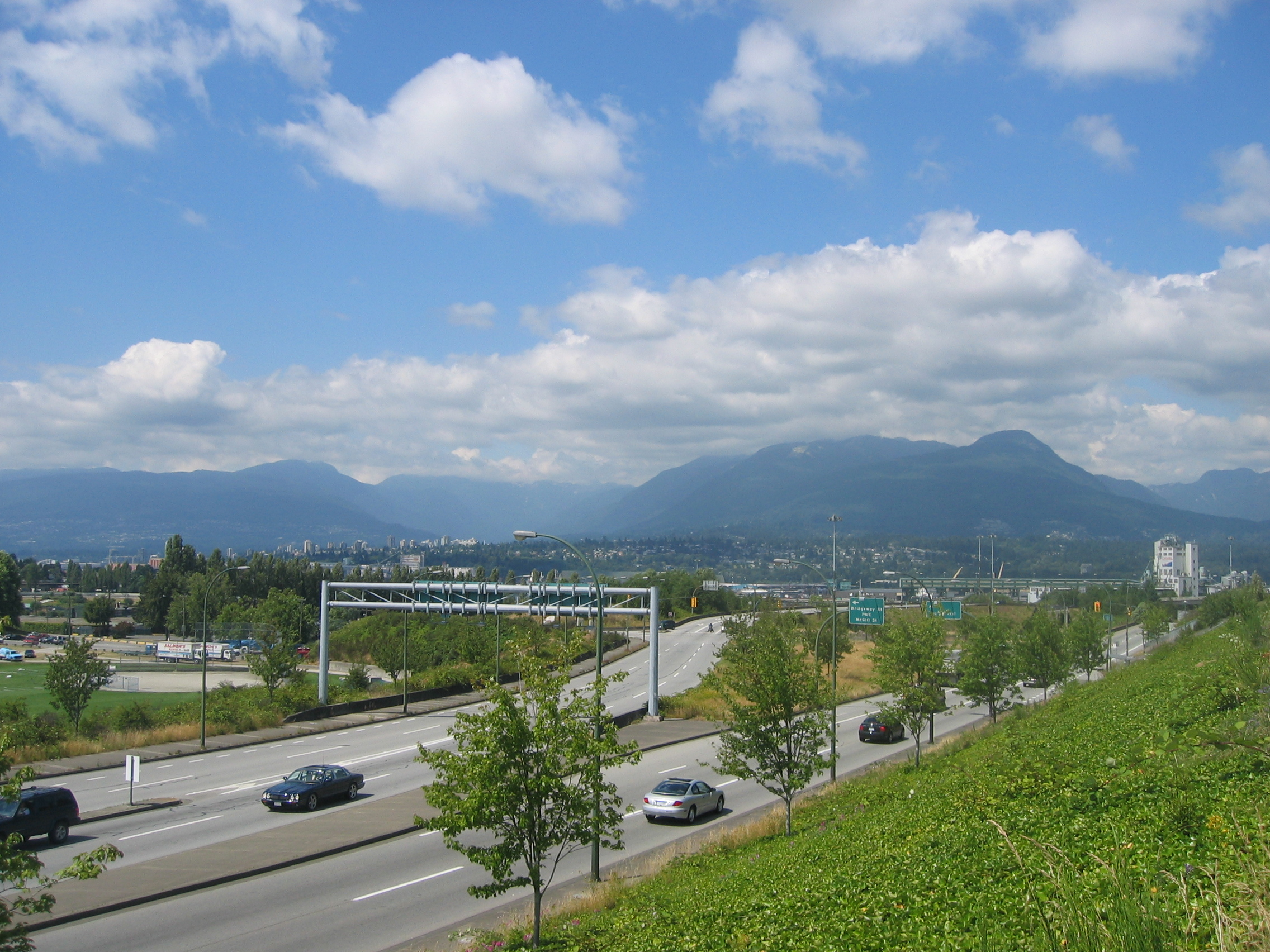
Off- and on-ramps leading to British Columbia Highway 1 in Vancouver. Highway 1 is the only controlled-access highway within the city limits.

Successive city councils in the 1970s and 1980s prohibited the construction of freeways as part of a long-term plan. As a result, the only major freeway within city limits is Highway 1, which passes through the north-eastern corner of the city. While the number of cars in Vancouver proper has been steadily rising with population growth, the rate of car ownership and the average distance driven by daily commuters have fallen since the early 1990s. Vancouver is the only major Canadian city with these trends. Even though the journey time per vehicle has increased by one-third and growing traffic mass, there are 7 percent fewer cars making trips into the downtown core. In 2012, Vancouver had the worst traffic congestion in Canada and the second-highest in North America, behind Los Angeles. As of 2013, Vancouver had the worst traffic congestion in North America. Residents have been more inclined to live in areas closer to their interests, or use more energy-efficient means of travel, such as mass transit and cycling. This is, in part, the result of a push by city planners for a solution to traffic problems and pro-environment campaigns. Transportation demand management policies have imposed restrictions on drivers, making commuting more difficult and expensive while introducing more benefits for non-drivers.

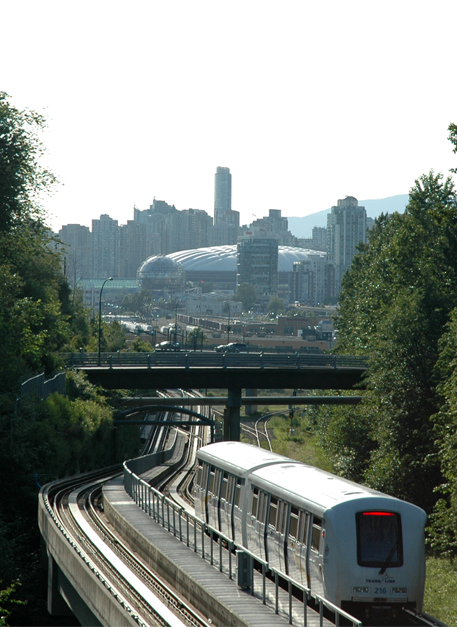
Vancouver's SkyTrain in the Grandview Cut, with downtown Vancouver in the background. The white dome-like structure is the old roof of BC Place Stadium.

TransLink is responsible for roads and public transportation within Metro Vancouver (in succession to BC Transit, which had taken over the transit functions of BC Hydro). It provides bus service, including the RapidBus express service, a foot passenger and bicycle ferry service (known as SeaBus), an automated rapid transit service called SkyTrain, and West Coast Express commuter rail. Vancouver's SkyTrain system is currently running on three lines, the Millennium Line, the Expo Line and the Canada Line with a total of 53 stations as of 2017. Only 20 stations are within the City of Vancouver borders, with the remainder in the adjacent suburbs. A number of the city's biggest tourist attractions – such as English Bay, Stanley Park, the Vancouver Aquarium, the Museum of Anthropology, and the Kitsilano neighbourhood – are not connected by this rapid transit system.

Changes are being made to the regional transportation network as part of Translink's 10-Year Transportation Plan. The Canada Line, opened on August 17, 2009, connects Vancouver International Airport and the neighbouring city of Richmond with the existing SkyTrain system. The Evergreen Extension, which opened on December 2, 2016, links the cities of Coquitlam and Port Moody with the SkyTrain system. As of January 2019, plans to extend the SkyTrain Millennium Line west to UBC as a subway under Broadway have been approved and there are plans for capacity upgrades and an extension to the Expo Line. Several road projects will be completed within the next few years, as part of the Provincial Government's Gateway Program.

Other modes of transport add to the diversity of options available in Vancouver. Inter-city passenger rail service is operated from Pacific Central Station by Via Rail to points east, Amtrak Cascades to Seattle and Portland, and Rocky Mountaineer rail tour routes. Small passenger ferries in False Creek provide commuter service to Granville Island, Downtown Vancouver and Kitsilano. Vancouver has a citywide network of bicycle lanes and routes, supporting an active cyclist population year-round. Cycling has become Vancouver's fastest-growing mode of transportation. The bicycle-sharing system Mobi was introduced to the city in June 2016.

Vancouver is served by Vancouver International Airport (YVR), located on Sea Island in the city of Richmond, immediately south of Vancouver. Vancouver's airport is Canada's second-busiest airport, and the second-largest gateway on the west coast of North America for international passengers. HeliJet and float plane companies operate scheduled air service from Vancouver harbour and YVR south terminal. Two BC Ferry terminals also serve the city. One is to the northwest at Horseshoe Bay in West Vancouver, and the other is to the south at Tsawwassen in Delta.

== Sports and recreation ==
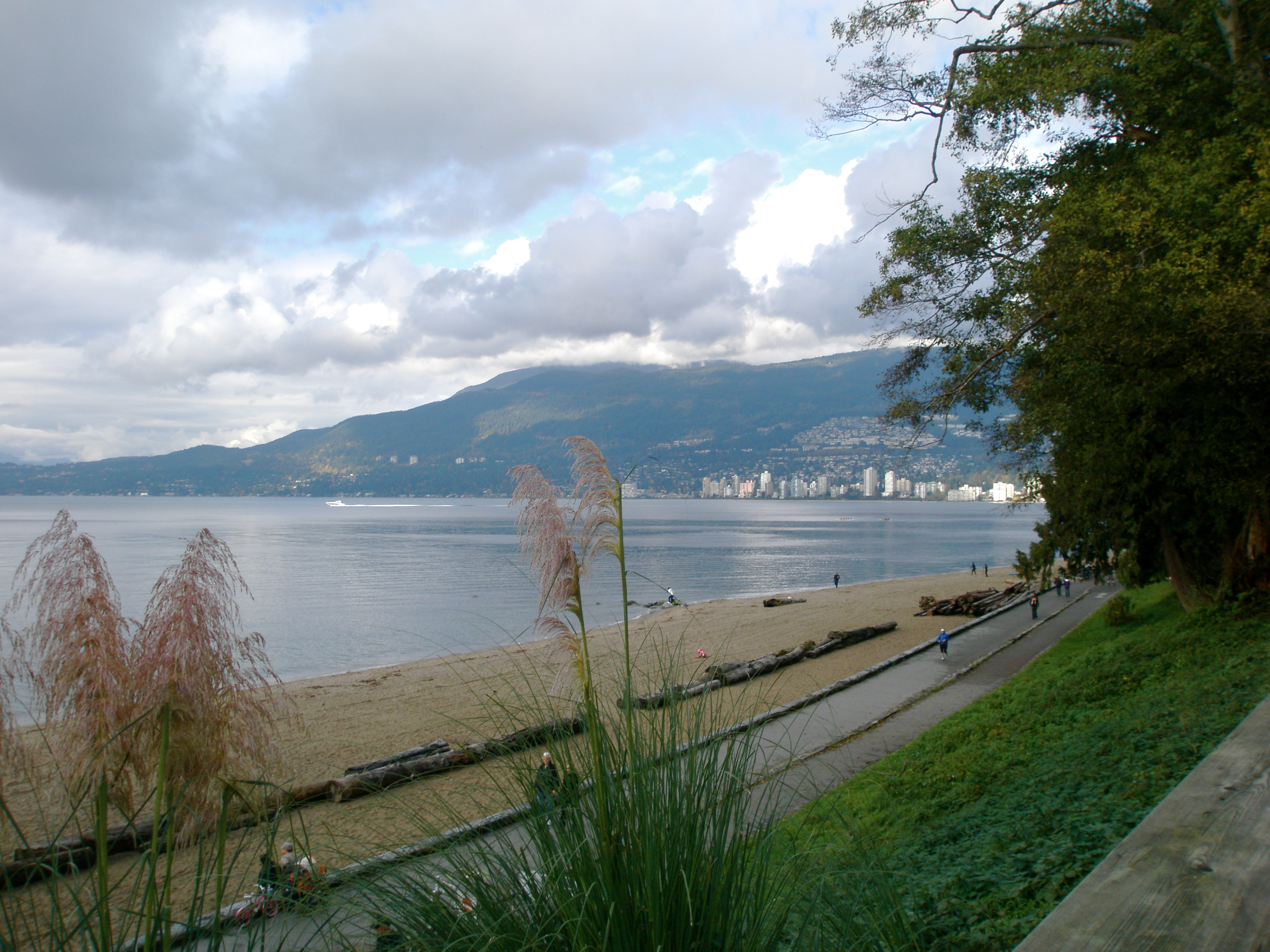
Third Beach is one of many beaches located in Vancouver. Given the city's proximity to the ocean and mountains, the area is a popular destination for outdoor recreation.

The city's mild climate and proximity to the ocean, mountains, rivers and lakes make the area a popular destination for outdoor recreation. Vancouver has over 1,298 ha (3,210 acres) of parks, of which Stanley Park, at 404 ha (1,000 acres), is the largest. The city has several large beaches, many adjacent to one another, extending from the shoreline of Stanley Park around False Creek to the south side of English Bay, from Kitsilano to the University Endowment Lands, (which also has beaches that are not part of the city proper). The 18 km (11 mi) of beaches include Second and Third Beaches in Stanley Park, English Bay (First Beach), Sunset, Kitsilano Beach, Jericho, Locarno, Spanish Banks, Spanish Banks Extension, Spanish Banks West, and Wreck Beach. There is also a freshwater beach at Trout Lake in John Hendry Park. The coastline provides for many types of water sports, and the city is a popular destination for boating enthusiasts.

Within a 20- to 30-minute drive from downtown Vancouver are the North Shore Mountains, with three ski areas: Cypress Mountain, Grouse Mountain, and Mount Seymour. Mountain bikers have created world-renowned trails across the North Shore. The Capilano River, Lynn Creek and Seymour River, also on the North Shore, provide opportunities to whitewater enthusiasts during periods of rain and spring melt. However, the canyons of those rivers are more utilized for hiking and swimming than whitewater.

Running races include the Vancouver Sun Run (a 10 km (6.2 mi) race) every April; the Vancouver Marathon, held every May; and the Scotiabank Vancouver Half-Marathon held every June. The Grouse Grind is a 2.9 km (1.8 mi) climb up Grouse Mountain, open throughout the summer and fall months, including the annual Grouse Grind Mountain Run. Hiking trails include the Baden-Powell Trail, an arduous 42 km-long (26 mi) hike from West Vancouver's Horseshoe Bay to Deep Cove in the District of North Vancouver.

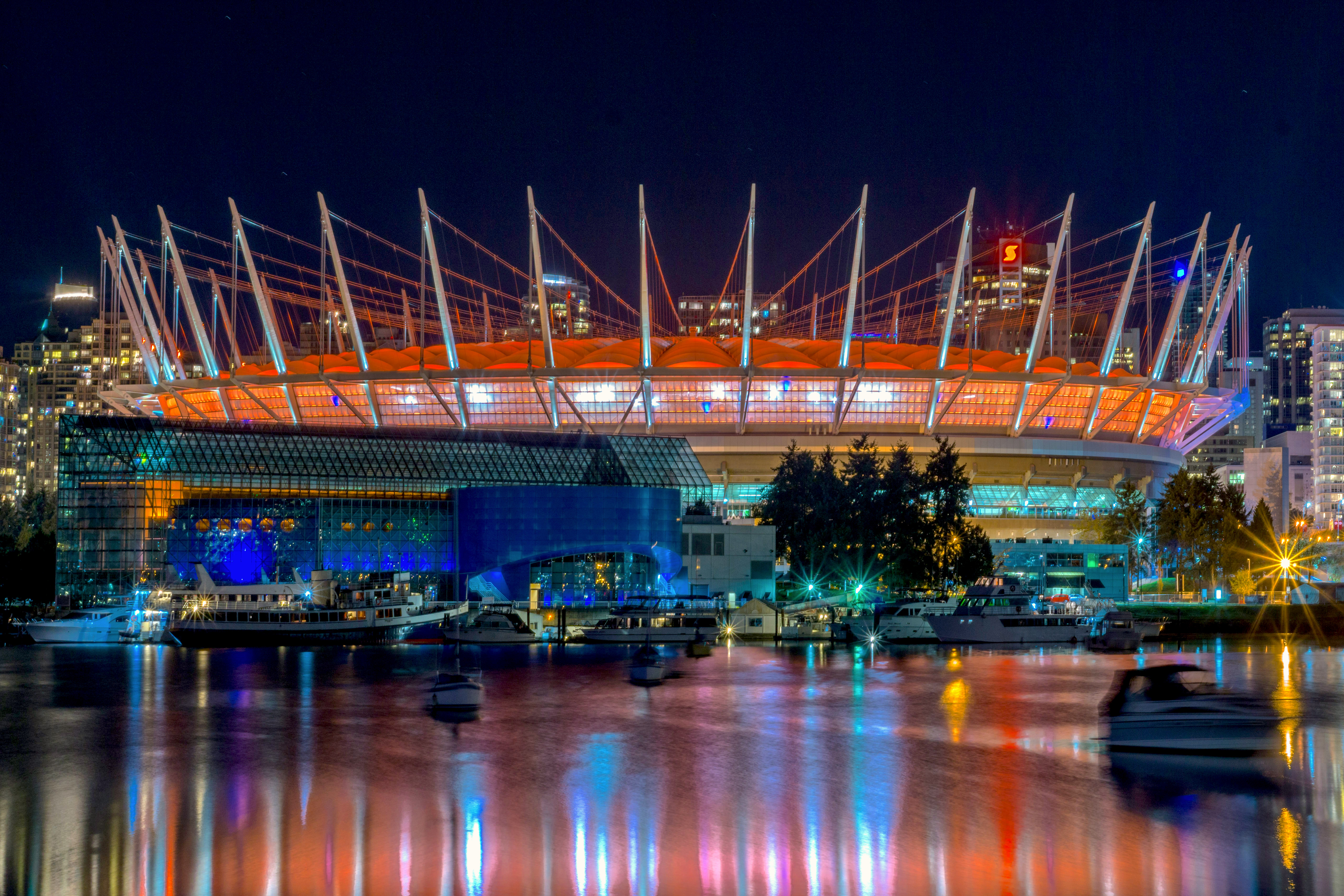
BC Place is a multi-purpose stadium that is home to the BC Lions of the CFL and the Vancouver Whitecaps FC of MLS.

Vancouver is also home to notable cycling races. During most summers since 1973, the Global Relay Gastown Grand Prix has been held on the cobblestone streets of Gastown. This race and the UBC Grand Prix are part of BC Superweek, an annual series of professional cycling races in Metro Vancouver.

The British Columbia Derby is a nine-furlong horse race held at the Hastings Racecourse in the third week of September.

In 2009, Metro Vancouver hosted the World Police and Fire Games. Swangard Stadium, in the neighbouring city of Burnaby, hosted games for the 2007 FIFA U-20 World Cup.

Vancouver, along with Whistler and Richmond, was the host city for the 2010 Winter Olympics and the 2010 Winter Paralympics. On June 12, 2010, it played host to Ultimate Fighting Championship 115 (UFC 115), which was the fourth UFC event to be held in Canada (and the first outside Montreal).

In 2011, Vancouver hosted the Grey Cup, the Canadian Football League (CFL) championship game, which is awarded every year to a different city that has a CFL team. The BC Titans of the International Basketball League played their inaugural season in 2009, with home games at the Langley Event Centre. Vancouver is a centre for the fast-growing sport of ultimate. During the summer of 2008 Vancouver hosted the World Ultimate Championships.

The Vancouver Canucks are an ice hockey team in the National Hockey League and have played there since 1970.

The National Basketball Association (NBA) expanded into Vancouver in 1995 with the establishment of the Vancouver Grizzlies. They played their games at GM Place (now Rogers Arena). After six years in Vancouver, the team relocated to Memphis, Tennessee in 2001.

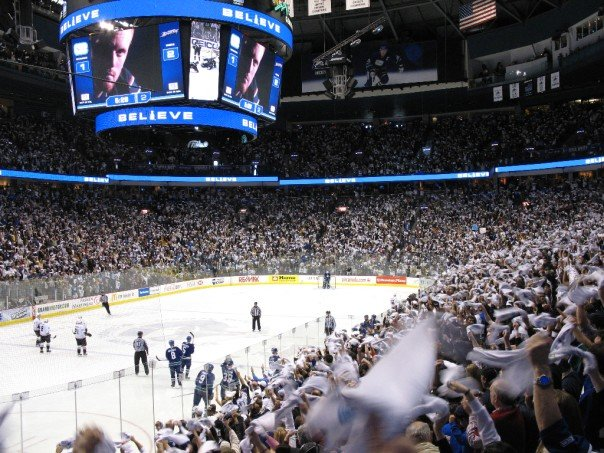
The Vancouver Canucks are an NHL team who play their home games in Rogers Arena.

In 2015, Vancouver was one of six host cities for the 2015 FIFA Women's World Cup and hosted the Final game between the United States and Japan. Eleven years later, Vancouver was one of two Canadian cities that hosted matches during the 2026 FIFA World Cup.

Vancouver is Canada's fittest major city, with an obesity rate of only 17.4%, compared to the national average of 24.8%. It is only surpassed by Kelowna, British Columbia with a rate of 17% and followed by Victoria, British Columbia at 19.6%. Overall, the province of British Columbia has the lowest obesity rate in Canada, followed by Quebec at 2nd and Ontario at 3rd.

== Sustainability ==
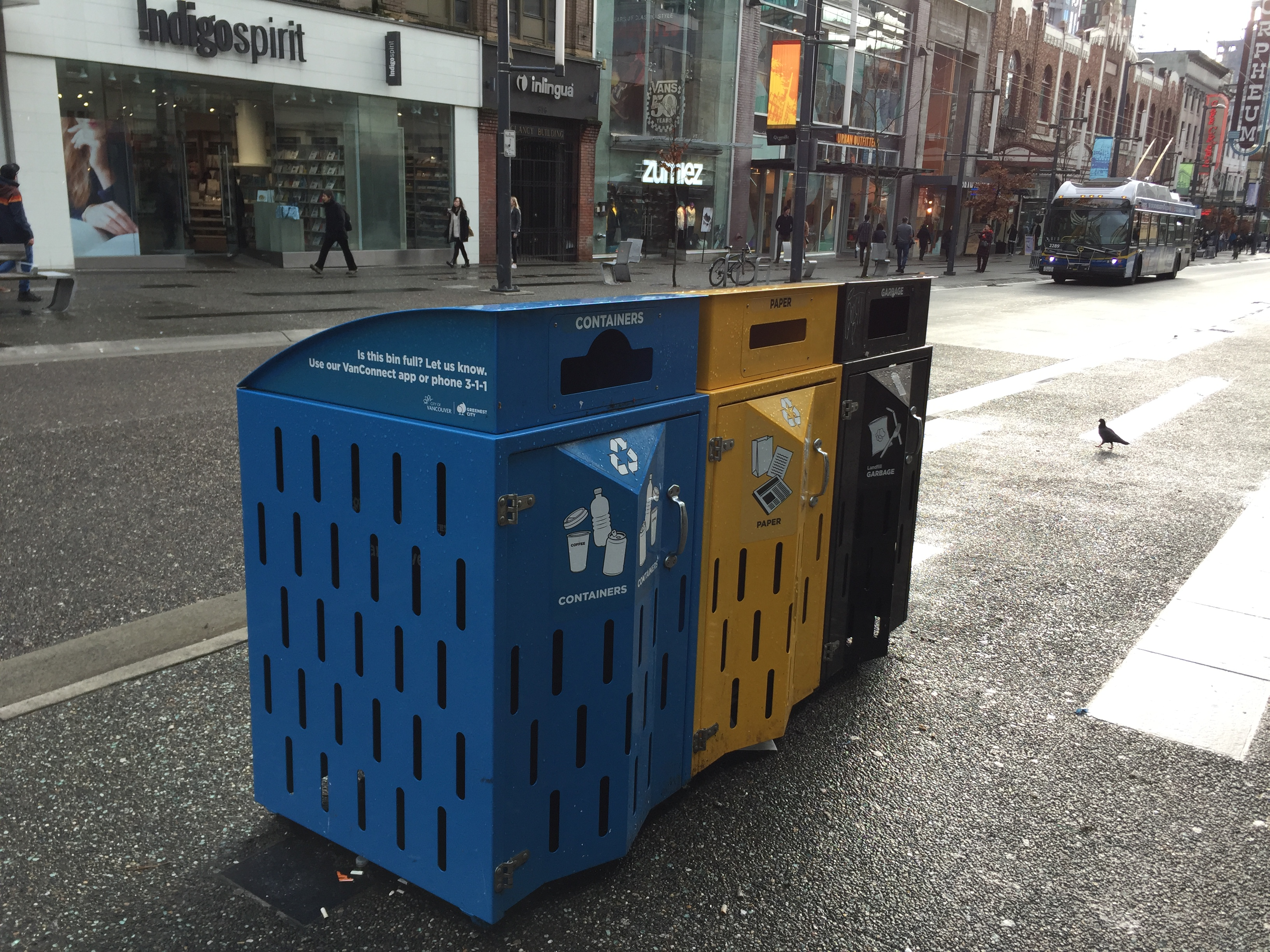
Container recycling, paper recycling and garbage bins in Vancouver

The City of Vancouver is a member of Metro Vancouver, which provides sustainable regional services to the Greater Vancouver area. The city electrical grid is serviced by BC Hydro, which claims 97.8% of the energy it generates is clean owing to the extensive use of hydroelectric power generation. The City of Vancouver is the greenest city in Canada according to an independent ongoing urban ecological footprint study.

The Greenest City action plan (GCAP) is a City of Vancouver urban sustainability initiative. Its primary mission was to ensure Vancouver would become the greenest city in the world by 2020. The GCAP originated based on the 2009 work of the Greenest City Action Team, a committee co-chaired by Vancouver mayor Gregor Robertson. The GCAP was approved by Vancouver city council in July 2011.

In May 2018, the Zero Waste 2040 Strategy was passed The city began work the same year on decreasing the amount of single-use items distributed in the city. It intended to ban these items by 2021 if businesses do not meet reduction targets. As part of the plan, a ban on plastic straws, polystyrene food packaging and free shopping bags was to go into effect in mid-2019.

In January 2022, the city council passed a regulation mandating that businesses charge a $0.25 fee on single-use cups. This decision was criticized because the fees stayed within the business and were not re-invested in city-wide environmental efforts. On March 28, 2023, the council enacted a by-law that repealed all single-use cup fees.

== Twin towns – sister cities ==
The City of Vancouver was one of the first cities in Canada to enter into an international sister cities arrangement. Special arrangements for cultural, social and economic benefits have been created with these sister cities.

Country	Municipality	Year
Ukraine	Odesa	1944
Japan	Yokohama	1965
Scotland	Edinburgh	1978
China	Guangzhou	1985
United States	Los Angeles	1986

== See also ==
- East Vancouver
- Gentrification of Vancouver
- History of Squamish and Tsleil-Waututh longshoremen, 1863–1963
- Leaky condo crisis
