= Library of things =

Collection of objects for loan

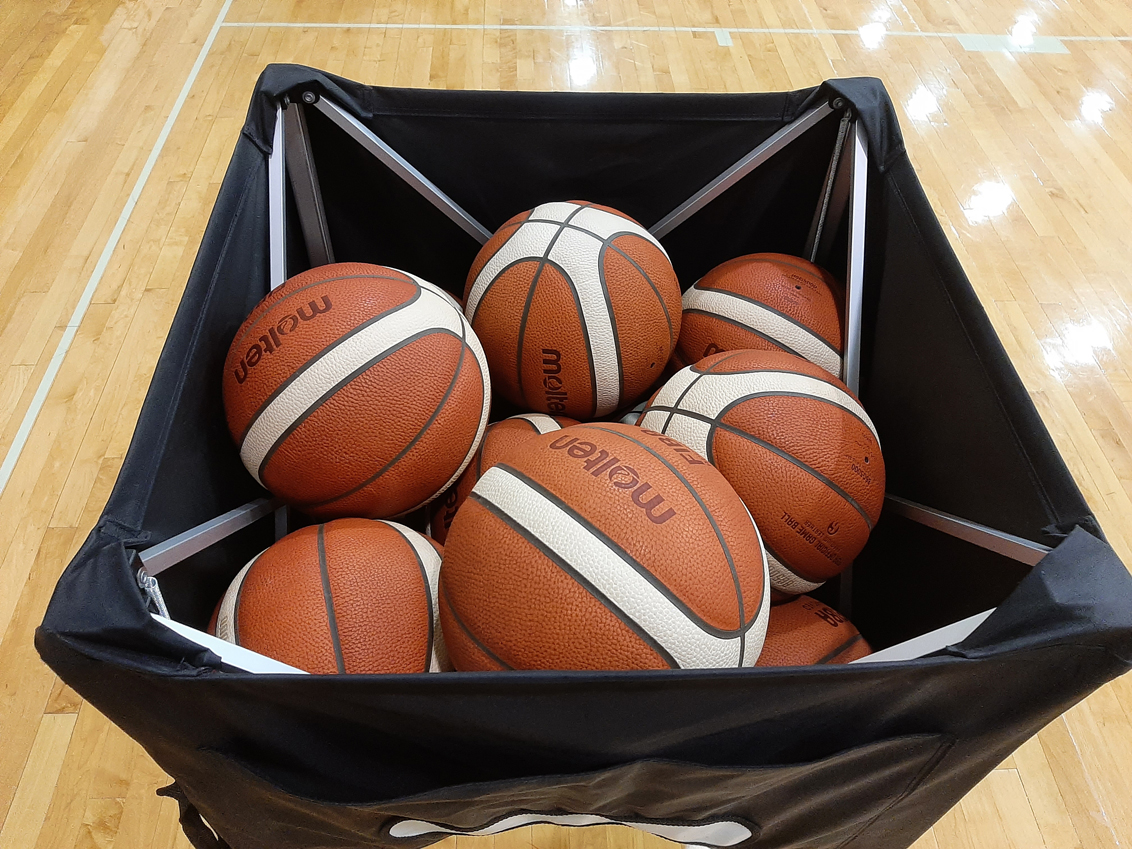
Balls for ball games is an example of sporting equipment which can be lent

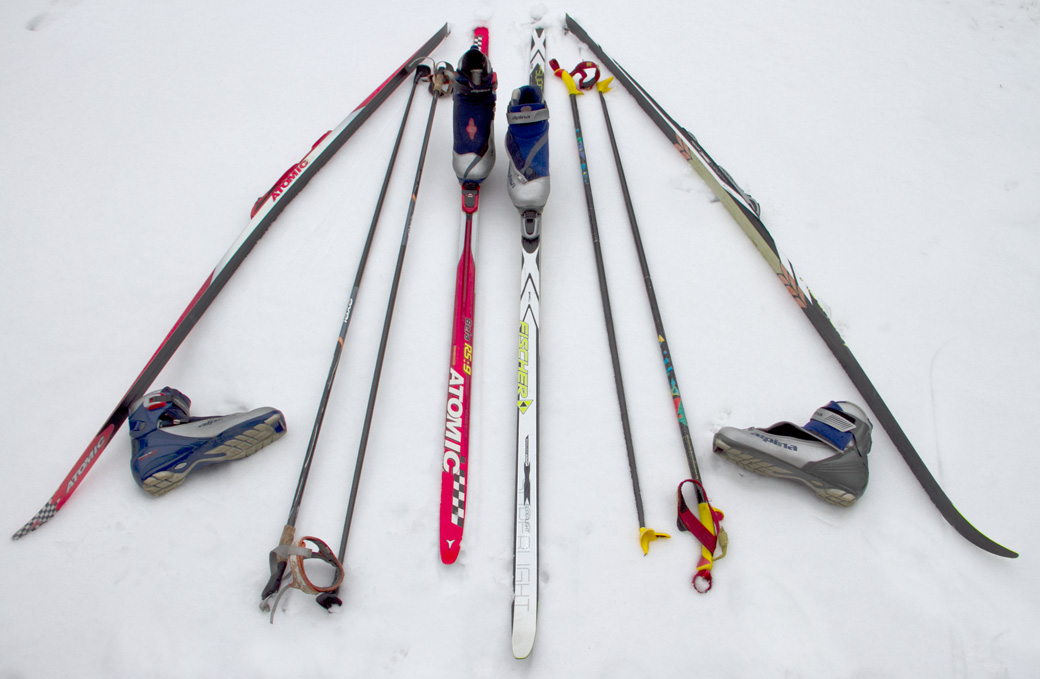
Skiing equipment

A library of things is any collection of objects loaned, and any organization that practices such loaning. Objects often include kitchen appliances, tools, gardening equipment and seeds, electronics, toys and games, art, science kits, craft supplies, musical instruments, and recreational equipment such as sports and outdoors gear. Especially appropriate are objects that are useful occasionally but cumbersome to store, such as specialized cookware or niche technology items. Collections vary widely, but go far beyond the books, journals, and media that have been the primary focus of traditional libraries.

The library of things movement is a growing trend in public, academic and special libraries in many countries. There are also free-standing organizations separate from libraries, such as tool libraries, toy libraries, community sharing centers, independent non-profits, and individual initiatives. The term "Library of Things" was popularized in the United Kingdom by a grassroots experiment started in London in 2014, themselves inspired by Toronto Tool Library. In the U.S., a librarian in Sacramento, California, came up with a similar idea and the same name in 2013. The Sacramento program, which launched in 2015, attracted substantial media coverage and inspired numerous copycats.

The Share Shed (Totnes, UK) is developing the first mobile library of things. Collections are often supported by educational programming and public events. These borrowing centers and library collections are part of the sharing economy.

In Wales, Benthyg Cymru have developed a network to support each other sharing knowledge not just things.

== Historical precedents ==
The library of things trend isn't entirely modern. In 1894, library patrons in St. Louis, Missouri, could borrow tennis rackets and board games. Other early examples of non-book items available for checkout from libraries include framed paintings (1904 in Newark, New Jersey), piano rolls (1907 in Evanston, Illinois), and stereoscopes (1909 in Portland, Oregon). In 1936, the Los Angeles Public Library added 7,126 used toys to its catalog.

== Types of collections ==
=== Arts and crafts ===
Art rentals are being made available for library patrons for borrowing prints, posters, paintings, and other visual art. Additionally, many libraries of things are adding arts and crafts equipment and supplies for use in the library or for check out. Crafting tools may include sewing machines, knitting kits, die-cutters, papercraft tools, jewelry repair and embroidery kits, scrapbooking supplies, and button makers.

=== Electronics and technology ===
Libraries have been lending electronics like e-readers, tablets, and laptops for quite some time already, but are now expanding the range of electronics that they lend through the library of things. Electronics offerings have expanded to include mobile hot spots, projectors, scanners, GoPros, graphics tablets, digital and film cameras, video games, converters (vinyl, cassette, and VHS to digital files), green screens, and video cameras.

=== Musical instruments ===
Instrument collections have been brought in to libraries, often accompanied by sheet music, tuners, amps, and educational resources. The Free Library of Philadelphia launched its Musical Instrument Collection (MIC) in 2016, and lending includes an electric guitar, mandolin, electric bass, ukulele, acoustic-electric guitar, and a banjo. Lopez Island Library in Lopez Island, Washington introduced a musical instrument "petting zoo", which includes instruments like acoustic and electric guitars, banjo, cello, clarinet, flugelhorn, French horn, electric keyboard, recorder, ukulele, viola and violin. In Oregon, The Jackson County Library Services Library of Things music collection includes a table top electric drum set and a kalimba thumb piano. Music Broth in Scotland has as of 2024 around 3000 instruments. Beginning in Glasgow in 2017, its library includes everything from guitars to ouds, домра/domra, violins, dulcimers, and electronic music equipment, all the way up to events equipment.

=== Kitchen equipment ===
Specialized kitchen equipment including food dehydrators, popcorn machines, ice cream makers, air fryers, instant pots, and Kitchen Aid blenders are available to borrow for home use. Cake pans and novelty bakeware have been particularly popular additions to libraries, with many stand-alone collections being created.

=== Gardening and seed libraries ===
Seed libraries have cropped up as a part of public library collections. Many have a policy for users who "check out" seeds for a growing season; they agree to plant the checked-out seeds and then save seeds from the yield to return to the collection for the following year. Some seed libraries have become a point of contention with state governments' agriculture departments. Agricultural equipment, landscaping tools, and gardening supplies are also included in 'things' collections, and may include rakes, hedge trimmers, pruners, hand tools, leaf blowers, and lawn mowers. Some libraries are also creating community gardens where library users can check out a garden plot for a growing season.

=== Home tools ===
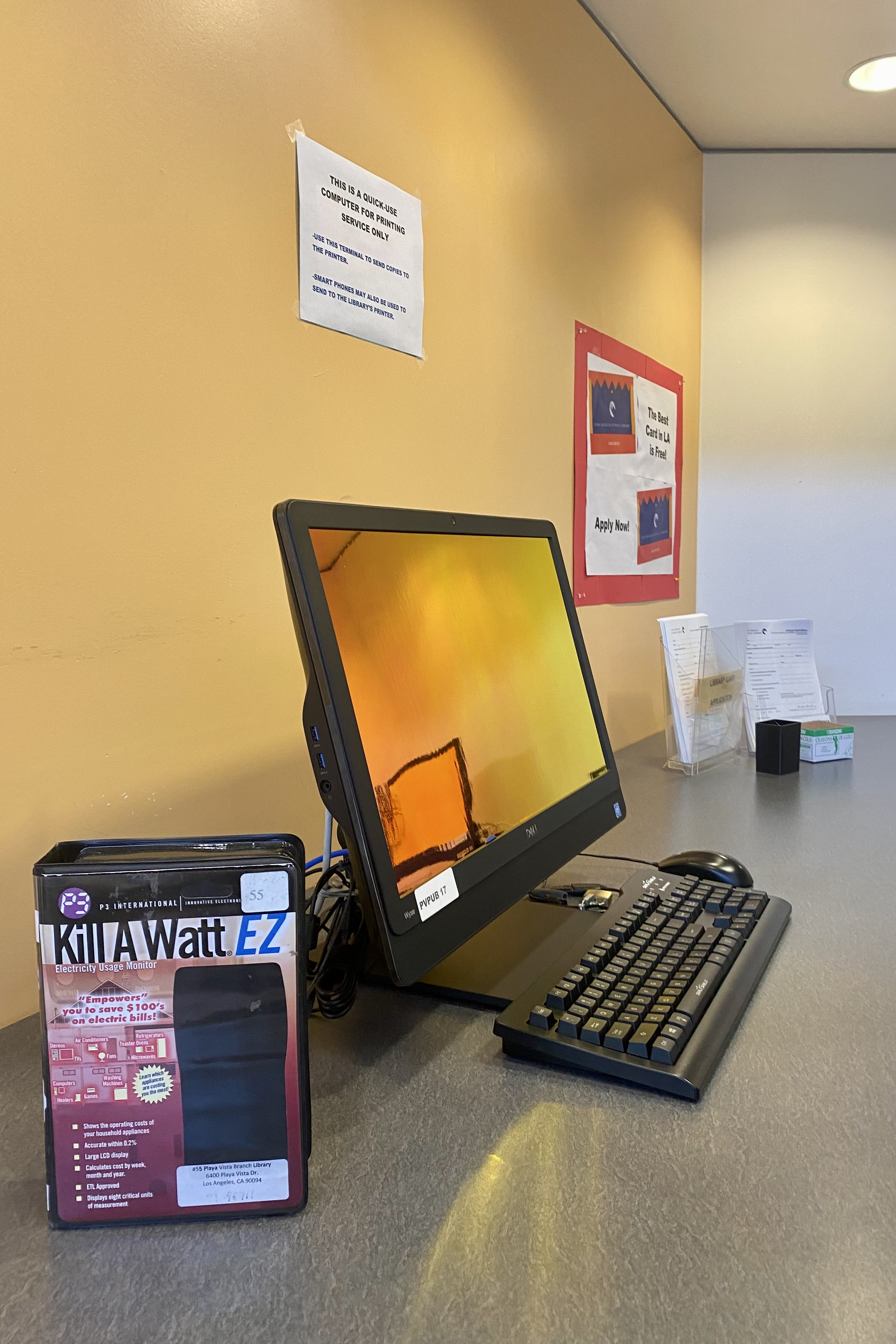
Kill A Watt, an electricity-use measurement tool, available to borrow at a Los Angeles Public Library branch

Home monitoring tools such as thermal cameras, leak detectors, air quality meters, infrared thermometers, energy meters, and other devices are available in some collections for borrowing.

=== Recreation ===
Some libraries are bringing in equipment to help users enjoy outdoor recreation, sometimes in partnership with local Parks and Recreation departments. Among a wide range of recreation equipment offerings are fishing rods, frisbees and whiffle balls, bird watching kits and croquet, badminton, bocce or pickleball sets.

Similarly, libraries are checking out party supplies for social recreation, including items like bubble, cotton candy, and karaoke machines, chocolate fountains, or boomboxes.

=== Science and maker ===
The Maker movement has had an influence on the collections available at Libraries of Things, and as a result there are littleBits, Arduino, Makey Makey, Raspberry Pi, robotics kits, coding toys, 3D printers and vinyl and laser cutters may be available for check out at many libraries. Similarly, science tools like digital microscopes, telescopes, light meters and themed science kits are being made available to borrow.

=== Tools ===
Tool libraries have gained popularity as free-standing borrowing centers in many cities, and libraries are also bringing in tool collections for borrowing. Hand and power tools for home improvement, construction and fine woodworking are popular additions to libraries, and often are accompanied by programming and educational opportunities.

=== Toys ===
Toy lending centers have a longer history, stretching back to the Great Depression. Recently, though, libraries have come to embrace the concept of toy libraries, and have introduced lending collections of puppets, board games, American Girl dolls, puzzles, blocks and a wide variety of other toys into their collections.

=== Other ===
The library of things movement is expanding to include an ever-widening array of items. Objects include tiebraries, taxidermied animals, museum passes, or Santa Claus suits. Palm Harbor Public Library in Florida has a collection for role playing games such as Dungeons and Dragons (the Mark Mazurek Role Playing Game Collections).

== List of organizations ==
=== Traditional libraries ===
- Allen County Public Library – Fort Wayne, Indiana, United States
- Altadena Libraries – Altadena, California, United States
- Ann Arbor District Library – Ann Arbor, Michigan, United States
- Banff Public Library – Banff, Alberta, Canada
- Bangor Public Library – Bangor, Maine, United States
- Berkeley Public Library – Berkeley, California, United States
- Beaverton City Library – Beaverton, Oregon, United States
- Bibliothek der Dinge Bochum, Germany
- Boston Public Library – Boston, Massachusetts, United States
- Bremen City Library – Bremen, Germany
- Bridges Library System – Waukesha County, Wisconsin and Jefferson County, Wisconsin, United States
- Brookline Public Library – Brookline, Massachusetts, United States
- Capital Area District Libraries – Michigan, United States
- Cary Memorial Library – Lexington, Massachusetts, United States
- County of San Luis Obispo Public Libraries – San Luis Obispo County, California, United States
- Charles M. Bailey Public Library – Winthrop, Maine, United States
- Clinton Essex Franklin Library System – Clinton County, Essex County, and Franklin County, New York, United States
- Curtis Memorial Library (Brunswick, Maine) – Brunswick, Maine, United States
- Deerfield Public Library – Deerfield, Illinois, United States
- Denver Public Library – Denver, Colorado, United States
- Dover Town Library – Dover, Massachusetts, United States
- Elmhurst Public Library – Elmhurst, Illinois, United States
- Englewood Public Library – Englewood, Colorado, United States
- Fort Vancouver Regional Libraries – Washougal, Washington, United States
- Framingham Public Library – Framingham, Massachusetts, United States
- Glencoe Public Library – Glencoe, Illinois, United States
- Glenview Public Library – Glenview, Illinois, United States
- Hartford Public Library – Hartford, Connecticut, United States
- Highland Park Public Library – Highland Park, Illinois, United States
- Hillsboro Public Library – Hillsboro, Oregon, United States
- Houston Public Library - Houston, Texas, United States
- Islington Libraries -- Islington, London, United Kingdom
- Jackson County Library Services – Oregon, United States
- Jefferson Parish Library – Metairie, Louisiana, United States
- Keene Public Library – Keene, New Hampshire, United States
- Kitchener Public Library – Kitchener, Ontario, Canada
- Kitsap Regional Library – Kitsap County, Washington, United States
- La Grange Park Public Library – La Grange Park, Illinois, United States
- Lake Forest Library – Lake Forest, Illinois, United States
- Lincolnwood Public Library District – Lincolnwood, Illinois, United States
- Livingston Public Library – Livingston, New Jersey, United States
- Maitland Public Library – Maitland, Florida, United States
- Matteson Area Public Library District – Matteson, Illinois, United States
- Mesa Public Library – Mesa, Arizona, United States
- Niles-Maine District Library – Niles, Illinois, United States
- Pasadena Public Library – Pasadena, California, United States
- Pasco County Library Cooperative – Florida, United States
- Pinellas Public Library Cooperative – Clearwater, Florida, United States
- Reading Public Library – Reading, Massachusetts, United States
- Richland Library – Richland County, South Carolina, United States
- Robbins Library – Arlington, Massachusetts, United States
- Sacramento Public Library – Sacramento, California, United States
- Salt Lake County Library – Salt Lake County, Utah, United States
- Skokie Public Library – Skokie, Illinois, United States
- Somerville Public Library – Somerville, Massachusetts, United States
- Springvale Public Library – Maine, United States
- St. Charles Public Library – St. Charles, Illinois, United States
- St. Louis County Library - St. Louis, Missouri, United States
- Sweetwater Public Library – Sweetwater, Tennessee, United States
- Telluride Public Library – Telluride, Colorado, United States
- The Urbana Free Library – Urbana, Illinois, United States
- Ulm City Library, Ulm, Germany
- Waterloo Public Library – Waterloo, Ontario, Canada
- Watertown Free Public Library – Watertown, Massachusetts, United States
- Washington-Centerville Public Library – Centerville, Ohio, United States
- Wayland Free Public Library – Wayland, Massachusetts, United States
- West Chicago Public Library – West Chicago, Illinois, United States
- Wilmette Public Library – Wilmette, Illinois, United States
- Winnetka-Northfield Public Library District – Winnetka, Illinois, United States

=== Free-standing ===
- allerleih e.V.- Kassel, Germany
- Belfast Tool Library – Belfast, Northern Ireland
- Benthyg – Cardiff, Wales
- Bibliothek der Dinge / Knižnica vecí – Goethe-Institut, Bratislava, Slovakia
- Borrow Don't Buy – Plymouth, England
- Borrow It! - Islington, London and Welwyn Garden City, England
- Brunswick Tool Library – Melbourne, Australia
- The Chicago Tool Library – Chicago, Illinois, United States
- Circle Centre Lund – Lund, Sweden
- De Spullenier – Utrecht, Netherlands
- Edmonton Tool Library – Edmonton, Canada
- Edinburgh Tool Library – Edinburgh, Scotland
- Glasgow Tool Library – Glasgow, Scotland
- Halifax Tool Library – Halifax, Canada
- Hull Library of Things – Hull, East Riding of Yorkshire, England
- Ilkley Thingery – Ilkley, West Yorkshire, England
- Islington, London, UK Borrow It!
- Knjižnica REČI – Ljubljana, Slovenia
- La Manivelle – Geneva, Switzerland
- La Manivelle – Lausanne, Switzerland
- Leihbar – Bonn, Germany
- LEIHOTHEK – Münster, Germany
- Leila – Berlin, Germany
- Leila – Leipzig, Germany
- Leihlager – Basel, Switzerland
- Llani Library of Things – Llanidloes, Wales
- Library of Things – Prague, Czech Republic
- Library of Things – London, England
- Knihovna věcí Brno – Brno, Czech Republic
- Library of Things – Saskatoon, Saskatchewan
- Library of Things – Kitchener, Ontario
- LUULA – Heidelberg, Germany
- Music Broth, Scotland (Musical Instrument Library)
- Northeast Seattle Tool Library – Seattle, WA
- Phinney Neighborhood Association Tool Library – Seattle, WA
- Santa Rosa Tool Library – California, United States
- Share Bristol – Bristol, England
- SHARE:Frome – A Library of Things – Somerset, England
- SHARE:Oxford – Oxford, England
- Share Shed – Brisbane, Australia
- Share Skipton – Skipton, England
- Sharing Depot – Toronto, Ontario
- Station North Tool Library – Baltimore, Maryland, United States
- Sydney Library of Things – Sydney, Australia
- Tool Library – Buffalo, United States
- Toronto Tool Library – Toronto, ON, Canada
- Vancouver Tool Library – Vancouver, BC, Canada
- West Philly Tool Library – Philadelphia, PA
- West Seattle Tool Library – Seattle, WA
