= Borrowing center =

Library of household items and tools

A borrowing center, borrowing shop, borrowing bar, item library or library of things is a library of household items and tools, usually organized as a volunteer cooperative, nonprofit organization, or operated by the local public library.

Borrowing centers are part of the sharing economy, which was termed in 1984 by Harvard economist Martin Weitzman. In contrast to a rental store, which offers many of the same items, borrowing centres are operated on a non-profit or collective basis.

The concept of a borrowing center is not new. Historically some public libraries have offered items beyond print and audio-visual media, such as toys. The concept is also similar to toy libraries, which have existed since at least 1935, and tool libraries.

One of the better-known borrowing centers is the Sharing Depot in Toronto, Canada.

== Similar terms/concepts ==
Borrowing center is not a popular term to be used, Tools Library shares the same or similar functions and concept as borrowing center and this term has been used more often. The concept of opening tools library is to provide tools which are not daily necessity and to promote the idea of sharing with others. Also it is a sustainable action to save resources on earth.

== Borrowing centers around the world ==
=== North America ===
1.Tool Library in Berkeley, USA

The First Tool Library started in 1979 in Berkeley, California, and now there are more than 40 tool libraries in North America.

2.Tool Lending library in Oakland, USA

Tool Lending Library offers practical tools, books, videos and DVDs. It is free to Oakland, Emeryville, and Piedmont residents and property owners.

3.Sharing Depot in Toronto, Canada

The Sharing Depot has been called as Canada's First library of things and it was opened in 2016.

=== Europe ===
Through a screenshot from the live “Map of Tool Libraries and Libraries of Things” at Localtools.org, borrowing center is much less common in Europe than in North America. And the reason why there are fewer borrowing center in Europe is unsolved.

== See also ==
- List of tool-lending libraries
- Public library
- Sharing economy
- Toy library
