= HTL =

HTL may refer to:

- Language technology
- HTL Buses, a bus company based in Merseyside, England
- Bell HTL a light helicopter
- Halifax Tool Library, a tool-lending library in Nova Scotia, Canada
- Heritage Trust of Lincolnshire, in England
- High tension line, used for electric power transmission
- Histology technologist
- High Threshold Logic, an electronic logic technology
- Höhere Technische Lehranstalt, engineering-focused secondary schools in Austria
- Hydrothermal liquefaction, a thermochemical depolymerisation process
- Roscommon County – Blodgett Memorial Airport, in Michigan, United States
