= Cornwall Tool Library =

Tool library

- Location: Ontario, Ontario, Canada
- Established: 2014
- Branches: 1

Collection
- Size: 228

Access and use
- Population served: 58,957
- Members: 150

Other information
- Director: Rony Macrone (Founding President)
- Employees: 0
- Website: cornwalltoollibrary.myturn.com

Cornwall Tool Library (CTL) is a tool lending public library system based in Cornwall, Ontario, Canada. Tool libraries loan specialized tools for both experienced and inexperienced community members who are interested in home repair, maintenance, building projects, community projects, gardening and landscaping. The CTL is a part of the Resource-Based Economy Group (RBEG), a registered Canadian non-profit, is responsible for the operations and management of the CTL. The CTL offers standard memberships to community members over 18 years of age.

== History ==
In 2014, the CTL was founded by Rony Macarone as a community resource to reduce the burden of improving and greening the places where we live, work and play. In 2014 the CTL moved into 10-A Fourth St. East, Unit A, Cornwall, Ontario. On Monday October 11, 2014, they had their grand opening and have been operating since. The CTL motto is "improving and greening the places where we live, work and play."

== Governance ==
The CTL is a project started by the Resource-Based Economy Group, a non-profit organization in Cornwall, Ontario. CTL is governed by a Board composed of citizen members who are responsible for the strategic planning, financial stability, and oversight of staff and volunteers. The Tool Committee and New Space Committee are used on both a temporary and permanent basis to meet requirements of the organization.

== Services ==
=== Collections ===
The tool library adapted Share Starter's free "Tool Library Starter Kit" which includes start up guidelines, frequently asked questions, and sample documents. The library uses "Local Tools" from "myTurn.com, PBC", a web-based inventory management system to track tool library members and to automatically display the tool availability online. The library has 367+ specialized tools from power drills and ladders to pressure washers and roto-tillers to loan to community members with all skill levels welcomed. The inventory of equipment includes automotive, bike, carpentry and woodworking, electrical and soldering, home maintenance, metalworking, plumbing, remodelling, sustainable living, and yard and garden. The types of equipment include: microcontrollers, signage & displays, hand tools, and power tools.

=== Training ===
The CTL offers affordable workshops open both to Tool Library members and the public on tool related skills and projects. In the Intro to Tools workshop, participants built a planter box; while in Routers 101, attendees created a cutting board.

== Mission ==
=== Tool library ===
The Tool library performs the following main tasks:

- Tool Lending: all kinds for use in volunteer projects, facility maintenance and improvement projects, community improvement events, and special events.
- Tool Advocacy: for the complete and timely return of all borrowed tools, to guarantee the long-term sustainability of available inventory. Staff also seeks compensation for lost tools and tools returned late.
- Tool Maintenance: performing routine maintenance and repairs on all equipment to ensure good condition and to extend the lifespan of the inventory. This function is typically performed by volunteers and community service workers.

=== Makerspace ===
Makerspace are places where people perform the following main tasks:

- to learn about technology, crafts and other kinds of making;
- to share knowledge and skills with others; and
- to apply this knowledge and skill by creating things.

== See also ==
- List of tool-lending libraries
