= Tarea =

Tarea may refer to:

- Homework (1991 film) (Spanish: La tarea), a Mexican drama film

== People with the name ==
- Tarea Hall Pittman (1903–1991), American civil rights leader
- Tarea Sturrup (born 1995), Miss Universe Bahamas 2019

== See also ==
- 1 Chronicles 8:34–35, where Tarea is listed among the grandsons of Meribbaal
