= Community gardens in New Orleans =

The community gardens in New Orleans, Louisiana, were first initiated in the 1980s when oil related-industries were leaving the city. The gardens were developed on indigent properties in an attempt to turn eyesores into attractive, productive spaces that could be useful and could support the surrounding neighborhood.

The idea was fostered through the Parkway Commission which was at that time saddled with the burden of improving blighted properties within the city. At its peak, 154 community gardens were developed through an organization called Parkway Partners. Through Parkway Partners, participants can gain access to a tool lending library, vegetable, herb and flower seeds, connections to suppliers and liability insurance.

With the passage of time, many of the gardens fell to disuse and the number of sustained gardens was reduced to about 50.

== See also ==
- Hill Farm Community Garden
