= Vancouver Tool Library =

Tool library in Vancouver, Canada

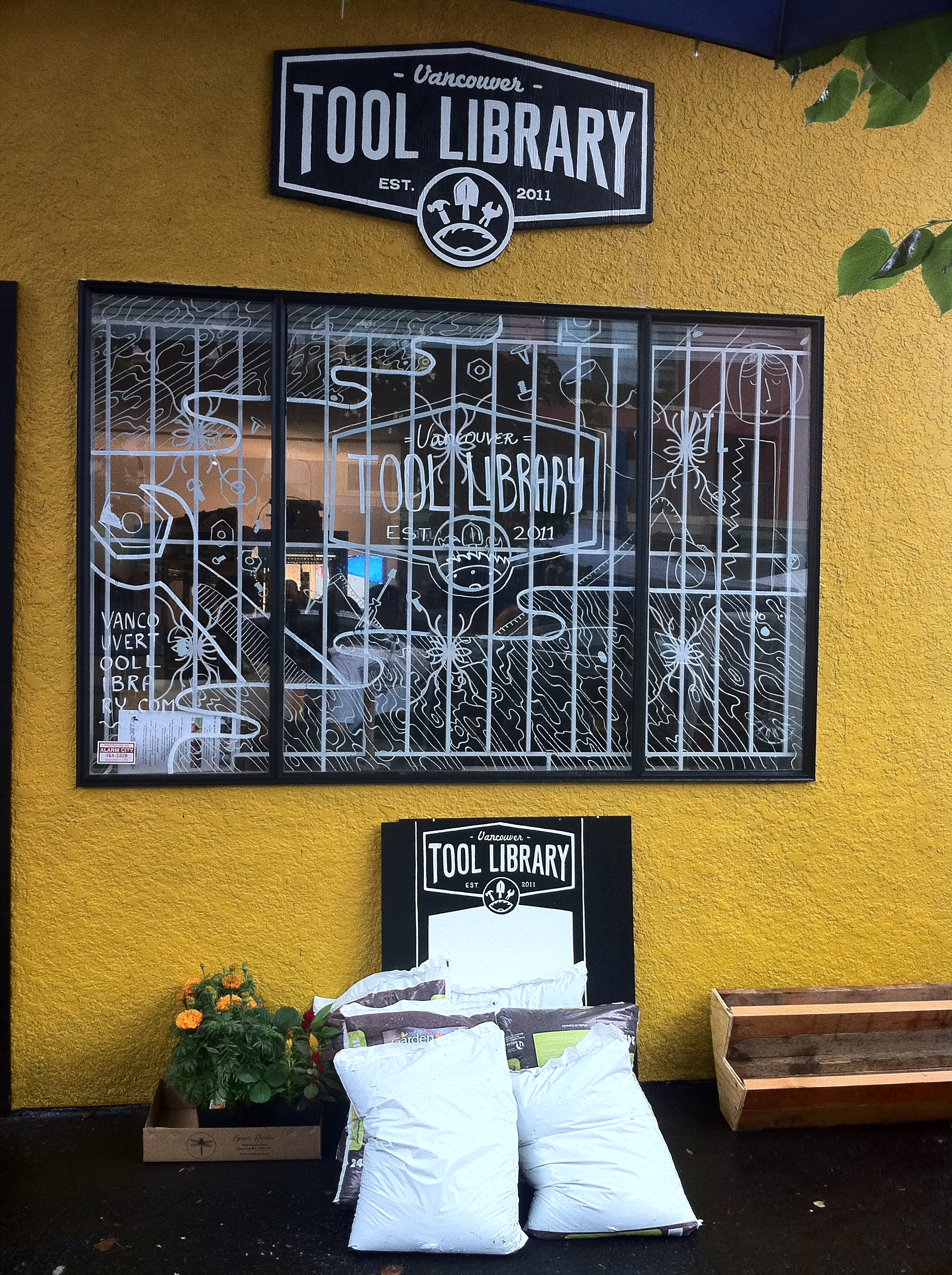
- 49.2539°N 123.0678°W
- Location: Vancouver, British Columbia, Vancouver, Canada
- Established: 2011
- Service area: Lower Mainland
- Branches: 1

Collection
- Size: 1,700+

Access and use
- Members: 815

Other information
- Director: Liam Shirley (President); Devin Greenfield (Vice President)
- Website: The Vancouver Tool Library

Vancouver Tool Library (VTL) is Canada’s original tool lending library system based in Vancouver, British Columbia, Canada.

Tool libraries loan specialized tools for both experienced and inexperienced community members who are interested in home repair, maintenance, building projects, community projects, gardening and landscaping.

The VTL is a Community Service Co-operative registered under the BC Co-operative Act.

The VTL offers standard, Student/Low-Income option, and organizational memberships to non-profits and small businesses.

The VTL is supported by the City of Vancouver; Mountain Equipment Co-op; the University of British Columbia Student Environment Centre; Magnet Home Hardware on Commercial Drive; Norco Bikes; Dewalt; Poco Building Supplies; Midland Liquidators; the Society Promoting Environmental Conservation; Tradeworks Training Society; Ten Thousand Villages; Rocky Mountain Flatbread Company; and many tool donors.

== History ==
In 2011, the VTL was established. The first branch was set up in 2011 at 3448 Commercial Street, Vancouver, BC.

== Governance ==
The VTL is governed by a Board composed of seven citizen members who are responsible for the strategic planning, financial stability, and oversight of staff and volunteers. The Tool Committee and New Space Committee are used on both a temporary and permanent basis to meet requirements of the organization.

== Services ==
=== Collections ===
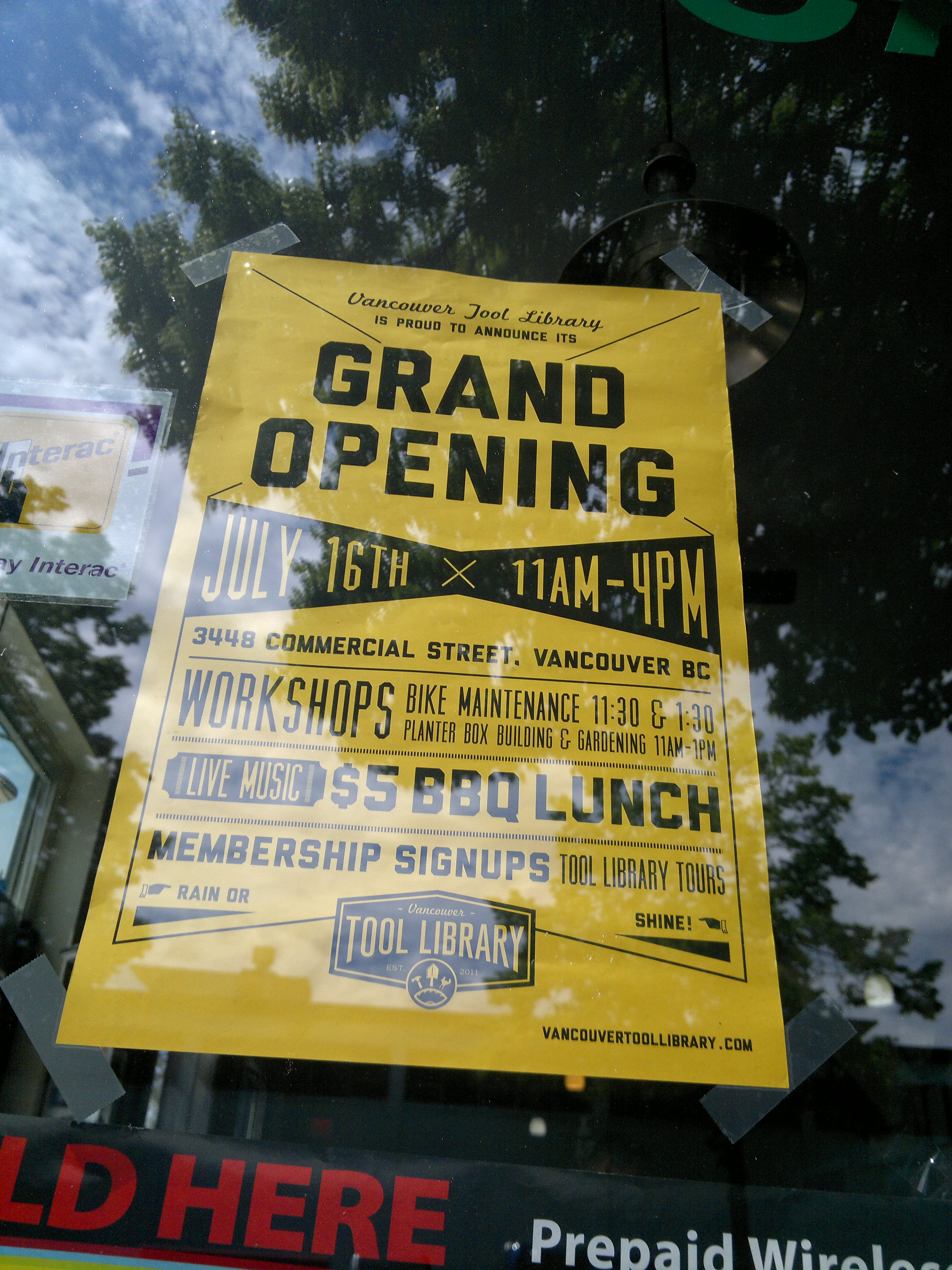
Vancouver Tool Library, 2011

The tool library adapted Share Starter's free "Tool Library Starter Kit" which includes start up guidelines, frequently asked questions, and sample documents. The library uses "Local Tools" from "myTurn.com, PBC", a web-based inventory management system to track tool library members and to automatically display the tool availability online.

The library has 1724+ specialized tools from power drills and ladders to pressure washers and roto-tillers to loan to community members with all skill levels welcomed. The inventory of equipment includes bike, carpentry and woodworking, electrical and soldering, home maintenance, ladders, measuring, metalworking, plumbing, remodelling, yard and garden tools. The types of equipment include: hand tools, power tools, propane & gas power tools, wheelbarrows & wagons.

=== Training ===
The Vancouver Tool Library offers affordable workshops open both to Tool Library members and the public on tool related skills and projects. In the Intro to Tools workshop, participants built a planter box; while in Routers 101, attendees created a cutting board.

== Branches ==
- Vancouver Tool Library, 3448 Commercial Street, Vancouver BC.

== See also ==
- List of tool-lending libraries
