= The Kitchen Library =

Lending library of kitchen appliances

Coordinates: 43.70767°N 79.39493°W

The Kitchen Library was the first non-profit lending library of kitchen appliances in Canada. Since opening its doors inside the Toronto Tool Library in October 2013, The Kitchen Library received local, national, and international media attention and community support. The Kitchen Library moved to Yonge and Eglinton (inside Living City Health) in October 2014 where they lent appliances and taught workshops. It closed September 1, 2016.

As urban populations grew and the average size of condominiums shrank, they argued that space and income should not be barriers to cooking or healthy eating. They aimed to build a more shareable city by giving residents access to otherwise costly, space-intensive kitchen appliances.

In 2014 they were named by Canadian Living as one of the "7 Canadian inventions that make your life better," and were featured in Toronto Life, The Toronto Star, The National Post, and CBC News.

== See also ==
- List of tool-lending libraries
- Sharing economy
