= Upholstery regulator =

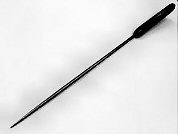
Thumb

An upholstery regulator is an upholstery tool that smooths irregularities in the stuffing beneath the coverings.

While it looks similar to a needle, it is heavier. Like needles, the regulator comes in various gauges and lengths. Upholsterers use it to poke through the multiple layers to adjust the stuffing before putting the final cover in place.

A related tool is the stuffing iron, which upholsterers use to push the stuffing into the curves and corners of furniture. It has a narrow piece of steel with one toothed edge to grab loose stuffing and place it in hard-to-reach spots.

== See also ==
- List of upholstery tools (image-heavy)
