= Toronto Tool Library =

Canadian tool library

Toronto Tool Library and Makerspace
- 43.639671°N 79.440546°W, 43.684200°N 79.318675°W, 43.680739°N 79.431167°W, 43.649987°N 79.397534°W
- Location: Toronto, Ontario, Canada
- Established: 2012; 14 years ago
- Branches: 4

Access and use
- Population served: 2,615,060 (2012)
- Members: 800

Other information
- Director: Tim Willison
- Employees: 7
- Public transit access: 510
- Website: torontotoollibrary.com

Toronto Tool Library (TTL) is a tool library system based in Toronto, Ontario, Canada. Tool libraries loan specialized tools for both experienced and inexperienced community members who are interested in home repair, maintenance, building projects, community projects, gardening and landscaping. In The Kitchen Library, small to medium-sized appliances are loaned for cooking and baking, serving equipment, culinary workshops. It partnered with the Toronto Public Library in 2015.

== History ==
In 2012, TTL was founded by Ryan Dyment and Lawrence Alvarez. TTL received its first grant from the Centre for Social Innovation and started a registered non-profit arm called the Institute for a Resource Based Economy (IRBE) in 2012. In March 2012, a tool lending library was established in Toronto west at the Parkdale Activity Recreation Centre, 1499 Queen Street West, Toronto. In October 2013, a tool lending library and Makerspace with a wood shop, laser cutter, 3D printers, workshops and community gatherings was established in Toronto East at 1803 Danforth Avenue, Toronto. The TTL partnered with the Toronto Public Library to open a brand new Tool Library on April 30, 2015, at the Downsview Public Library branch of the TPL, located at 2793 Keele Street.

TTL is supported by the Ontario Trillium Foundation, Pioneer +TO, tool donors and volunteers. In 2018, TTL was at risk of closing, but was able to remain open due to a crowdfunding campaign which raised over $37,000.

== Governance ==
The Toronto Tool Library is governed by a Board composed of eight citizen members.

== Services ==
=== Collections ===
The tool library adapted Share Starter's free "Tool Library Starter Kit" which includes start up guidelines, frequently asked questions, and sample documents. The library uses "Local Tools" from "myTurn.com, PBC", a web-based inventory management system to track tool library members and to automatically display the tool availability online. The library has loaned over 12,000+ specialized tools from power drills and ladders to pressure washers and roto-tillers to community members with all skill levels welcomed. The inventory of equipment includes automative, bike, carpentry and woodworking, electrical and soldering, home maintenance, metalworking, plumbing, remodelling, safety equipment, sustainable living, yard and garden. The types of equipment include: network equipment, books, cars, googles, helmets, handtools, packages, power tools, wheelbarrows & wagons.

=== Training ===
The Makerspace offers affordable workshops open to Tool Library members on tool related skills and projects. In the Intro to Tools workshop, participants learn to use hand and power tools that are available at the Tool Library.

== Branches ==
- Tool Library, Sharing Depot and Makerspace, 192 Spadina Avenue, Toronto.

== See also ==
- List of public libraries in Ontario
