= Library makerspace =

Makerspace located in a library

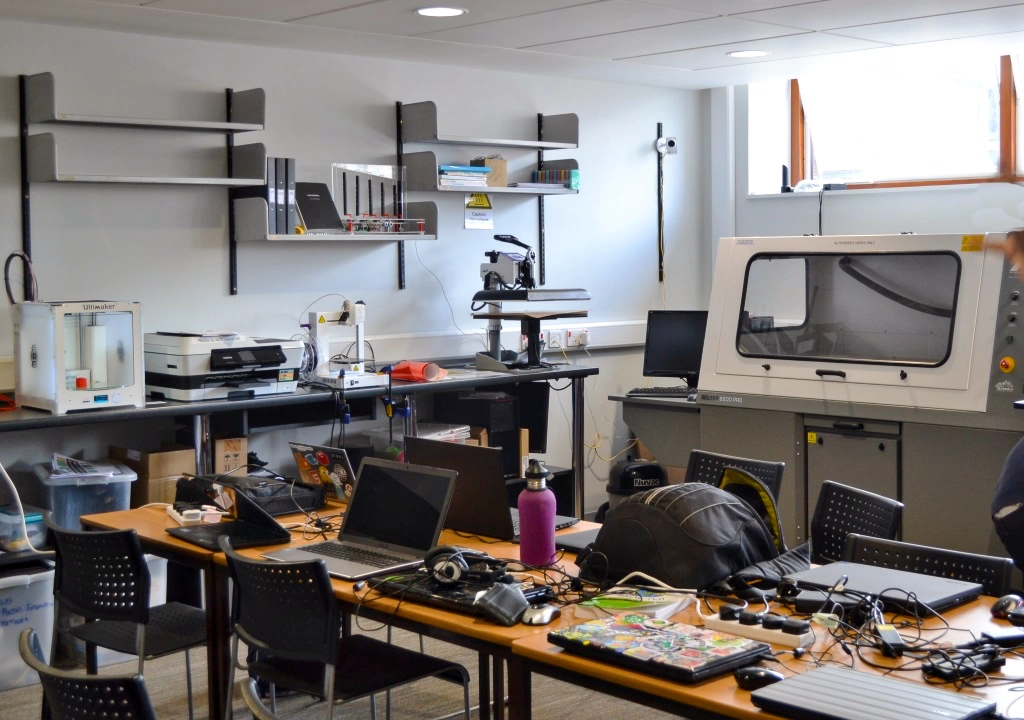
Makerspace in a library

A library makerspace, also known as a hackerspace or hacklab, is an area and/or service that offers library patrons an opportunity to create intellectual and physical materials using resources such as computers, 3D printers, 3D scanning, audio and video capture and editing tools, and traditional arts and crafts supplies. In the field of library science, makerspaces are classified as a type of library service offered by librarians to patrons.

== Definition ==
In a library makerspace or maker program, patrons of varying ages can work together, alone, or with library staff on creative projects. These spaces often give community members access to tools, technology, and knowledge that may not be easily accessible or affordable otherwise. The goal of a makerspace is to allow patrons to learn through direct experimentation and from each other. Library makerspaces do not require specified areas; a pre-existing space can be temporarily modified (or "made") to better suit the needs of participants. It is more about the intentions of the makers than about the qualities of the space itself. In fact, the Makerspace Playbook states: “A collection of tools does not define a Makerspace. Rather, we define it by what it enables: making.”

== History ==
The force behind the initial “maker movement” is believed to be the creation of Make: magazine in 2005, which published information about maker-related projects. The momentum grew when the magazine devised a series of venues for makers to express themselves and share their creations deemed “maker faires”. Libraries took notice and began offering programs and redesigning spaces to address related interests within their communities. The first public library with a maker space was the Fayetteville Free Library. Lauren Britton conceived of the idea of creating the makerspace at the Fayetteville Free Library as part of her coursework as a MLIS student.

Although the modern history of the makerspace library movement began in 2005, making in libraries began earlier than that. In 1873, the Gowanda Ladies Social Society, which later became the Ladies Library Association, was created “to quilt, knit, sew, socialize, and talk about books.”

In 1905, the Carnegie Library of Pittsburgh’s children’s department provided crafts for children. In 1979, the Merrimack Public Library in New Hampshire also provided crafts for children.

== Purposes ==
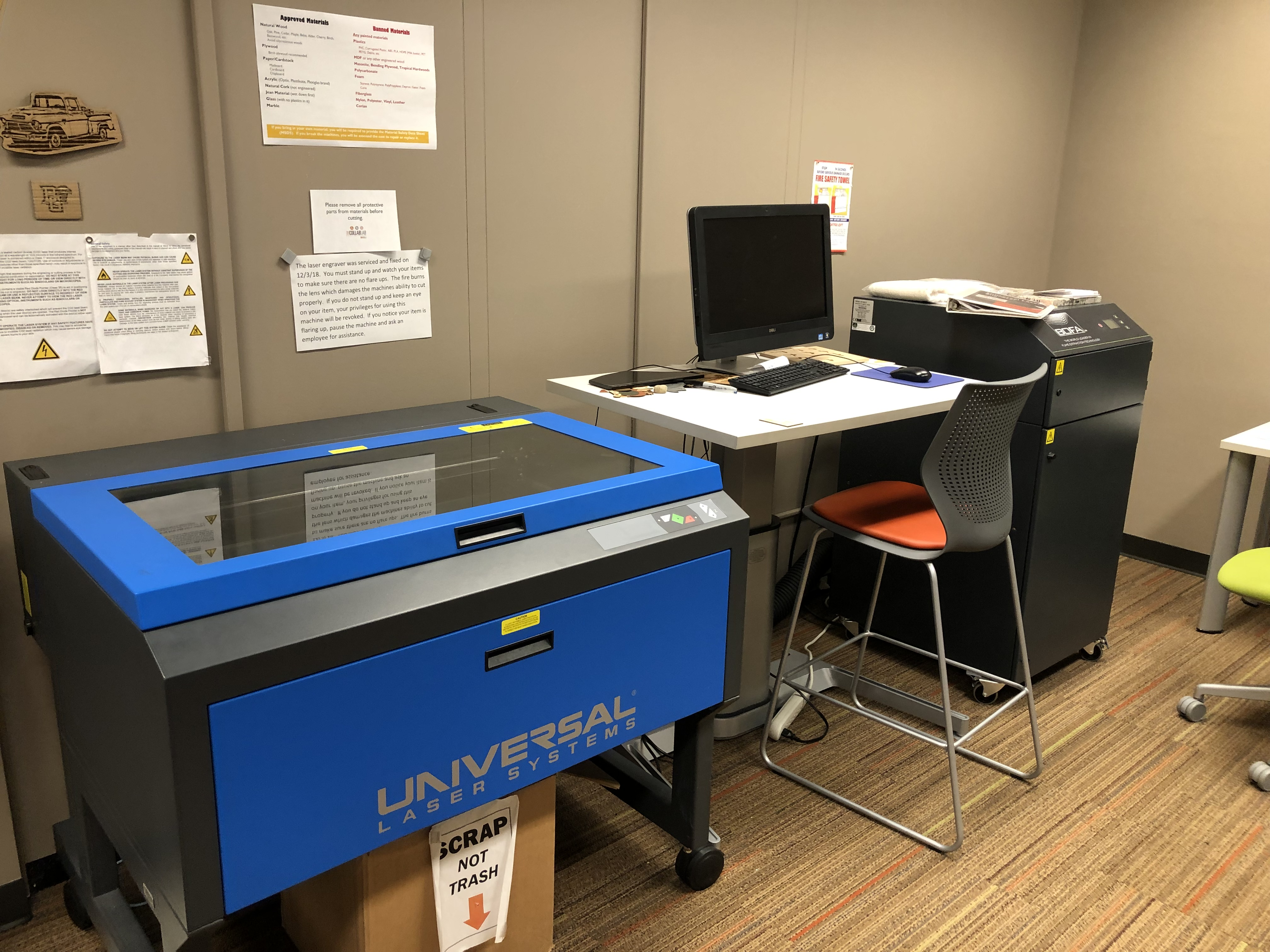
A laser cutter in a library

A library makerspace is intended to allow community members to experience technology or activities that they previously were not able to access. As many maker spaces include technology like 3D printers, sewing machines, soldering irons, coding, robotics, and wood carving machines, patrons are invited to experiment freely. The purpose of a maker space is often expressed to be inspiring an interest in science, technology, design, and lifelong learning in the people who are served by the library. Library makerspaces may be viewed in terms of an information literacy lens. Over time, it is expected that the available activities within each individual maker space will grow to reflect the interests of each community in which the library is housed. Makerspaces are also intended to allow minorities or underrepresented populations, like women, or people with disabilities, to become involved with technology and fields they may not have previously considered. The extent of activities and services in a makerspace is essentially determined by the target audience, the funds available and the objectives of the host institution.

== Types of activities and technology ==
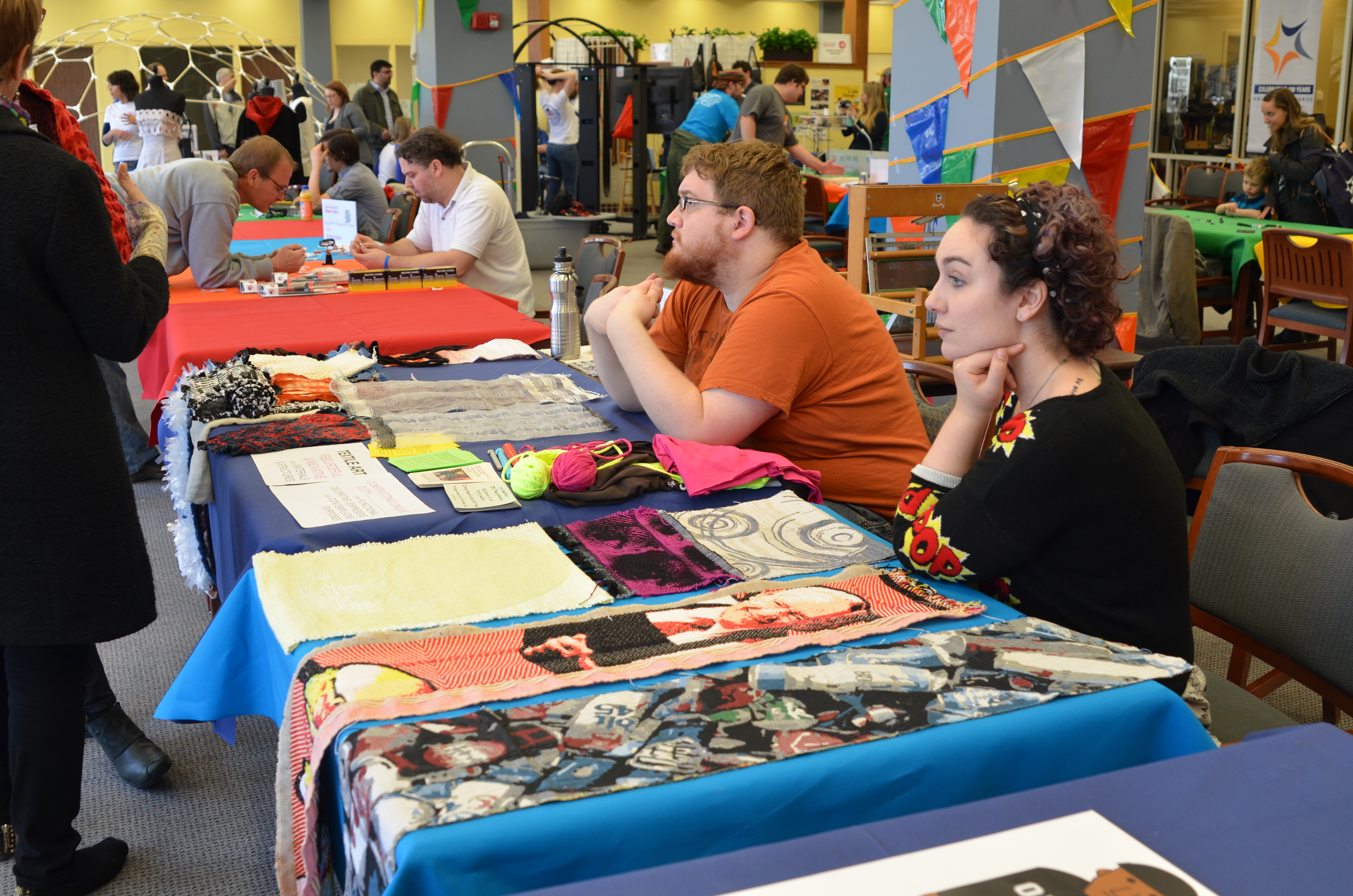
A mini maker faire held in a library

There are many types of makerspaces offered as a library service. They are usually developed around a certain type of medium, technology, or even patron age group. Some examples include computer programming and coding, CryptoParties, digital privacy workshops, Free Software advocacy, robotics and electronics, 3D modeling and printing, laser cutting, board games, and traditional arts and crafts. Although experts in the area may be available, the community atmosphere of the space allows patrons to learn from each other and experiment rather than receive lessons.

Maker spaces have also grown to allow patrons to take classes to develop a certain skill, like cooking, sewing, leather working or yoga.

== Criticism ==
When the concept of makerspaces in libraries was first introduced in the early 2010s, it was anticipated that some librarians would feel reluctant to allocate resources away from other services and that there could be issues of legal liability to consider. Resources exist to assist libraries in making decisions about liability waivers and safety forms in addition to other potential legal concerns.

== See also ==
- Tool library
- Fab lab
- Hackerspace
