= Berkeley Public Library =

- U.S. National Register of Historic Places
- Berkeley Landmark
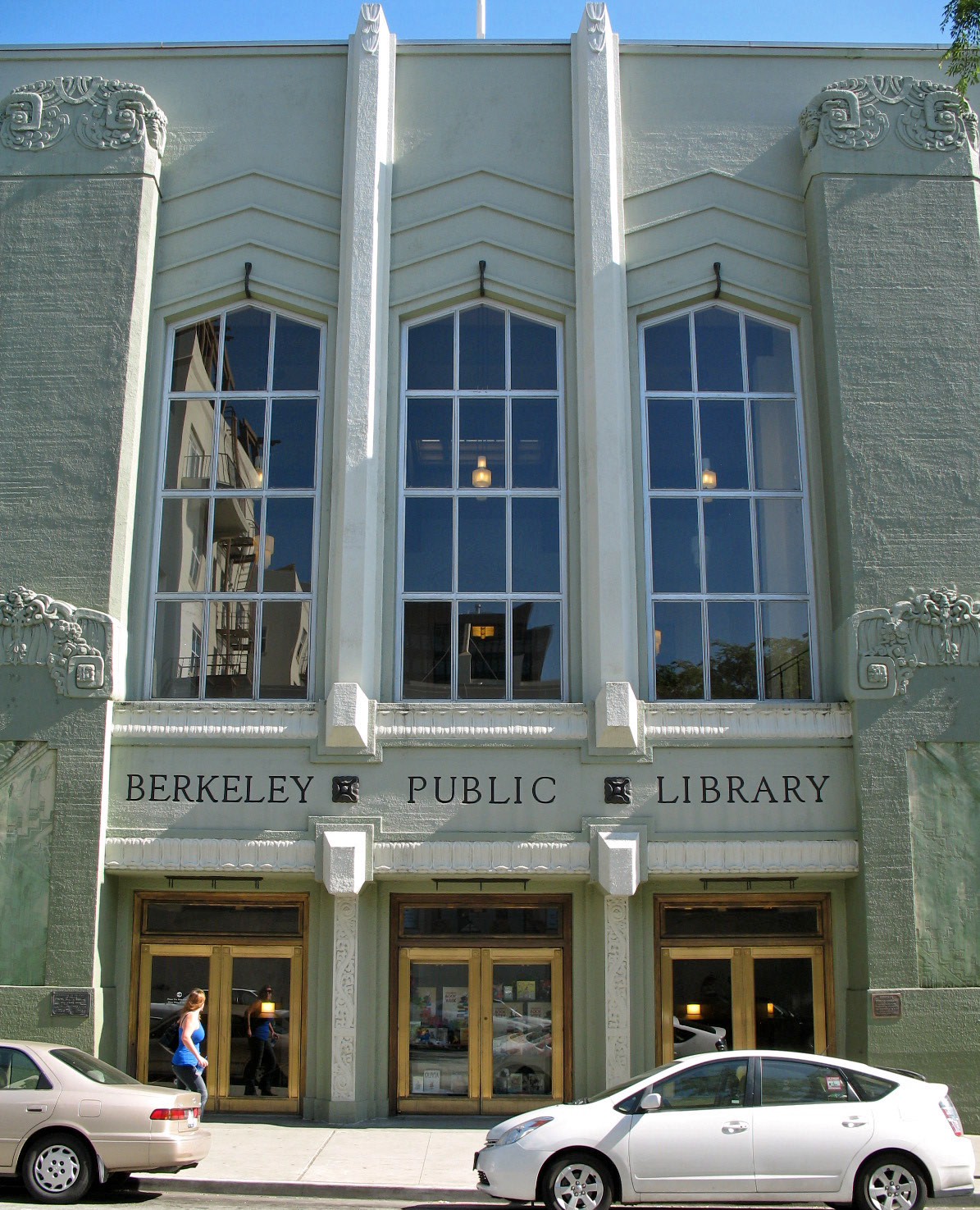

- Location within Oakland, California Location within California Location within the United States
- Location: 2090 Kittredge St., Berkeley, California
- Coordinates: 37°52′5.39″N 122°16′7″W
- Built: 1931 - 1934
- Architects: Plachek, James W.
- Architectural style: Moderne, Zig Zag Moderne
- NRHP reference No.: 82002156
- BERKL No.: 57

Significant dates
- Added to NRHP: June 25, 1982
- Designated BERKL: April 19, 1982

The Berkeley Public Library is the public library system for Berkeley, California. It consists of the Central Library, Claremont Branch, North Branch, West Branch, Tarea Hall Pittman South Branch, and the Tool Lending Library, which is one of the nation's first such libraries.

== History ==
The Berkeley Public Library opened in 1893 on Shattuck Avenue with 264 books. In 1905, the library moved to a new brick building on Shattuck Avenue at 2090 Kittredge Street. The new library was funded by Andrew Carnegie and built on land donated by Rosa M. Shattuck, the widow of Francis K. Shattuck. Immediately following the 1906 San Francisco earthquake and the resulting population surge from across the San Francisco Bay, the library opened four other branches around Berkeley. In 1930, the library was demolished and a new design from architect James W. Plachek was approved. Construction of the new building began in 1930. The new central library opened in 1931, where it remains. It was renovated and reopened in 2002.

In 2011, the Berkeley Public Library began a series of renovations and expansions of its four neighborhood branches. It completed renovation of the Claremont and North Branches in 2012, the South Branch and Tool Lending Library in May 2013, and the West Branch library in December 2013. During construction, a bookmobile called the Branch Van parked near each location to conduct basic transactions and provide access to library collections in the local neighborhoods.

On July 1, 2018, the Berkeley Public Library eliminated overdue fines for non-children's media; children's books were already fine-free. The Tool Lending Library followed suit on October 3, 2022.

Also in 2018, Berkeley Public Library instituted the Easy Access Card, a library card available to persons without a fixed address.

== Technology ==
All Berkeley Public Library branches have self-checkout machines. Patrons can use these to check out materials themselves by scanning the items and their library card. This checkout method works for all media—books, CDs, DVDs, etc.—and provides the patron with a receipt for the items. All branches still also offer checkout from library staff at circulation desks.

Patrons can also request and renew books over the Internet from their homes, or over the telephone.

== Tool Lending Library ==
The Tool Lending Library opened in 1979 and is one of the nation's first such libraries. It is located at the South Branch. To borrow tools, patrons must be over the age of 18 and be residents or property owners of the city of Berkeley.

Tool Lending Library offerings include basic hand tools, light power tools, and equipment: screwdrivers, various hammers, drills, biscuit jointers, string trimmers ("weed wackers") shovels, ladders, concrete mixers—and free advice. Lending times are seven days for everything.

== Gallery ==
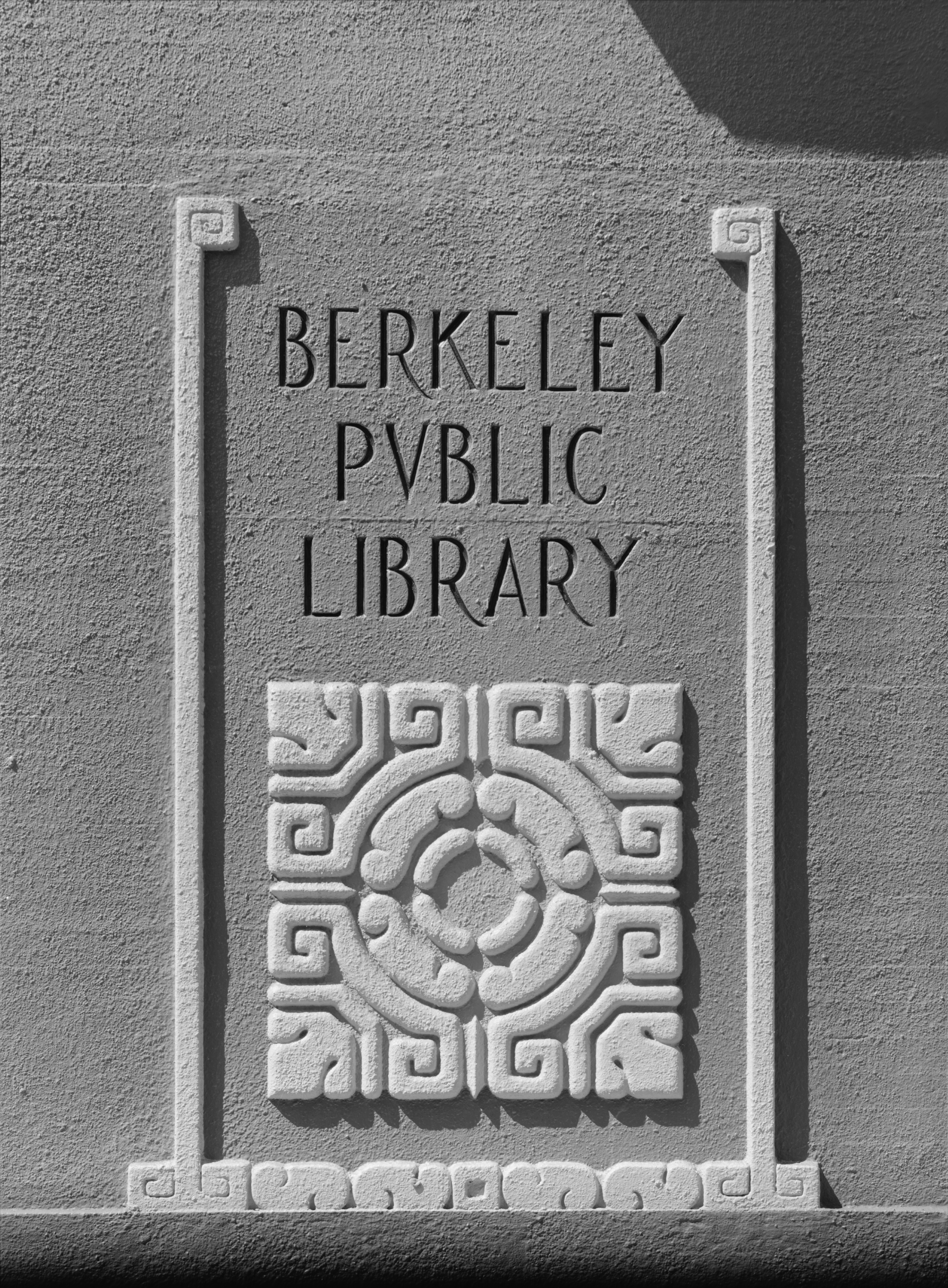
Incised lettering above a fanciful Mayan rosette

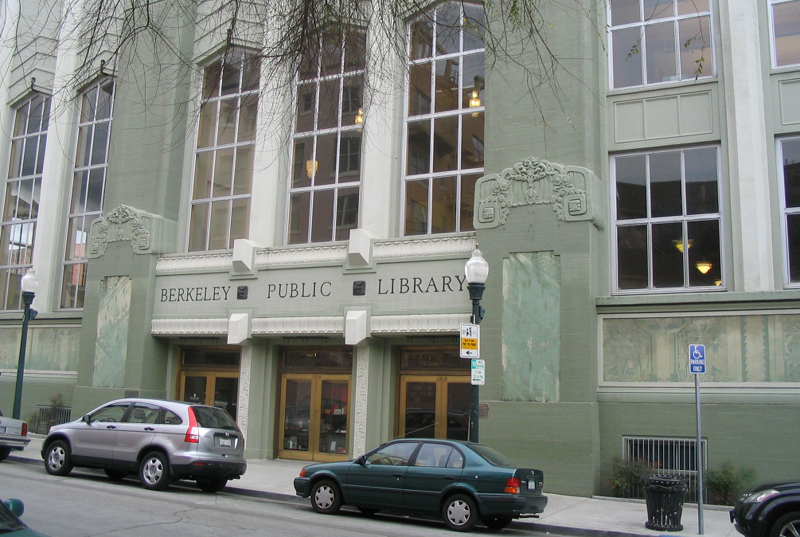
The Central Branch of Berkeley Public Library, renovated and reopened in 2002

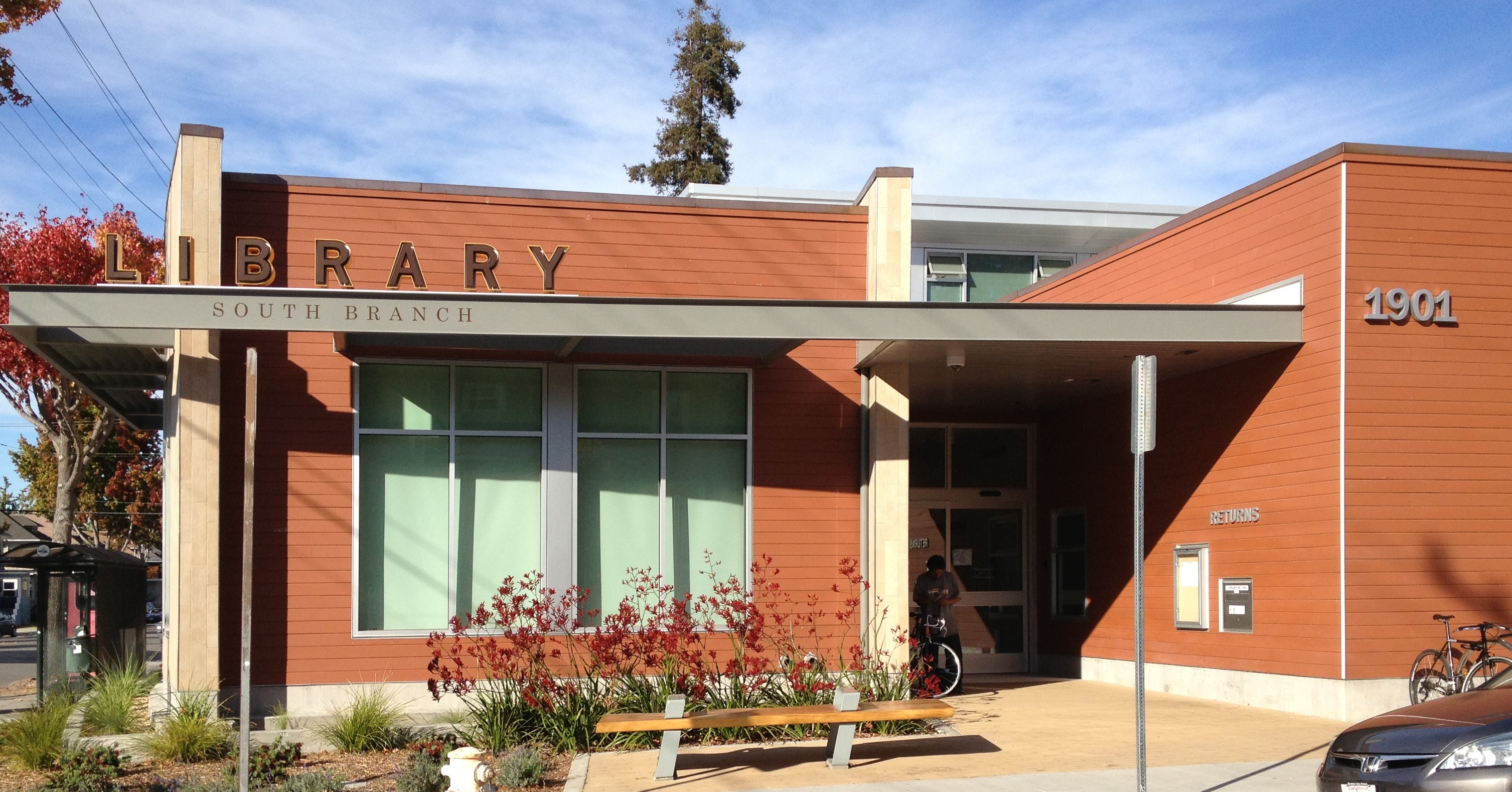
The South Branch, renovated in 2013

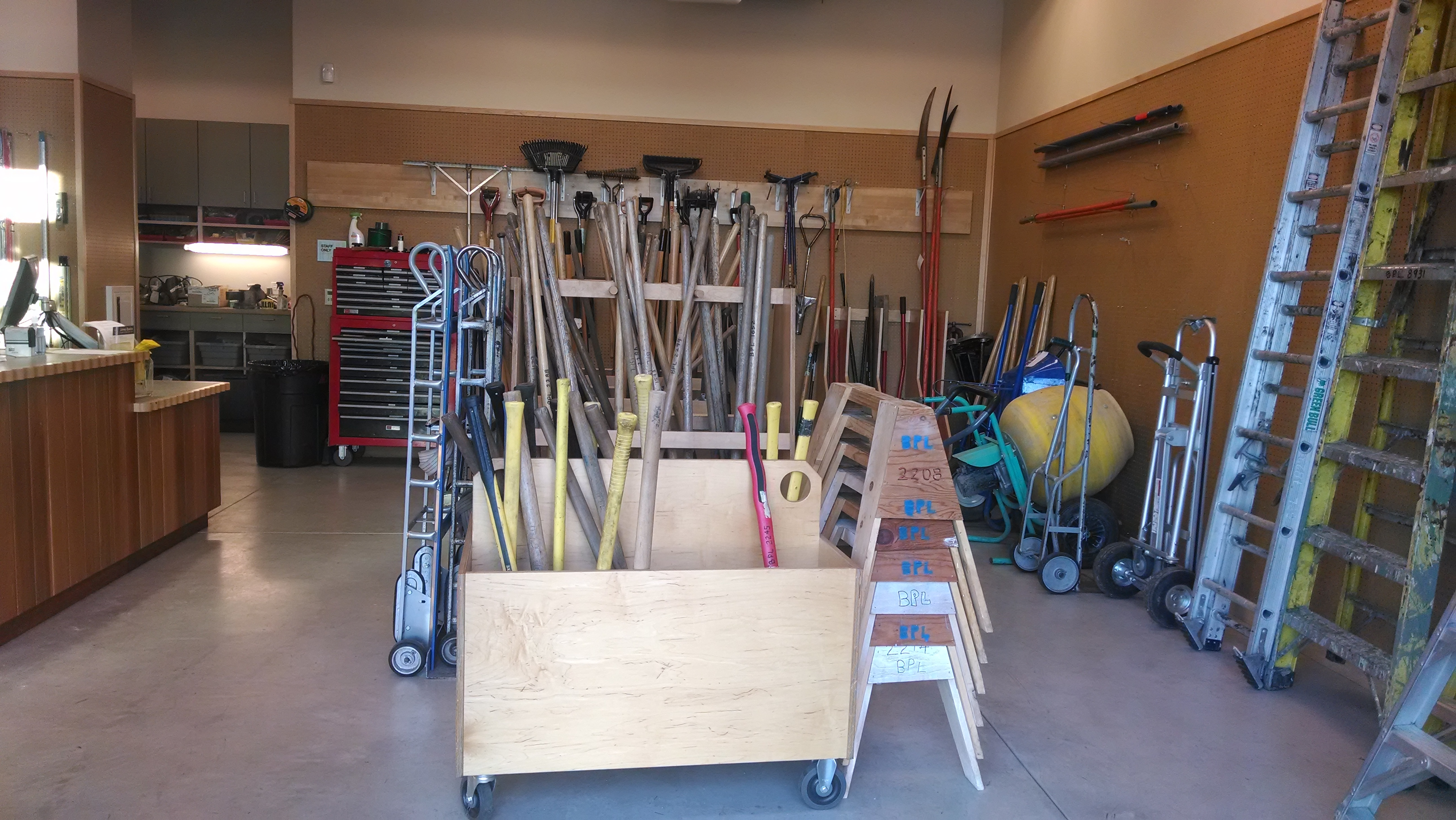
The tool lending library at the South Branch
