= Toy Libraries Australia =

Australian nonprofit supporting community-run toy libraries nationwide

- Abbreviation: TLA
- Founded at: Melbourne, Victoria
- Type: Nonprofit
- Location: Australia
- CEO: Debbie Williams
- Main organ: Committee
- Funding: Federal and state governments, memberships
- Website: toylibraries.org.au
- Formerly called: Toy Libraries Association of Victoria, Toy Libraries Victoria

Toy Libraries Australia are a not-for-profit organisation which serves as the governing body for volunteer-run toy libraries within Australia.

TLA supports over 280 toy libraries in Australia, 130 of which are in Melbourne. In 2020, the number of toy library memberships in toy libraries supported by TLA was over 130,000.

== History ==
Toy Libraries Australia started in 1977 as the Toy Libraries Association of Victoria, uniting five Victorian toy libraries. The name was changed to Toy Libraries Victoria in 2000, and then to Toy Libraries Australia in 2012.

Toy Libraries Australia won the Marie Claire Sustainability Award in the "parenting" category in 2024.

== Organisation ==
In 2024, the Australian Federal Government provided AU$2.3million of funding to Toy Libraries Australia. However, government funding is not continuous and the main stable income comes from membership fees.

Toy Libraries Australia is primarily volunteer run, with two paid staff members.

== Initiatives ==
In March 2025, TLA announced grants for toy libraries to support them in being more accessible for children with disabilities, in particular ADHD and autism. The grants are intended to help toy libraries run as low-sensory sessions, increase volunteer and staff training, buy specialised toys, and set up a mobile toy library in Western Australia.

The TLA's Toy Well Program runs 18 free toy libraries in Victoria for children from migrant and refuge families.
