= Toy library =

Establishment acting as a library where toys are loaned

A toy library is a type of library that lends or hires out toys, puzzles, and games. They can function as either as a rental shop, part of a public library, or family resource program. Some toy libraries offer play sessions for families. Toy libraries are internationally federated by the International Toy Library Association (ITLA).

== Use ==
People may choose to use toy libraries rather than buying toys for multiple reasons, such as saving money, reducing consumerism, and a sense of community.

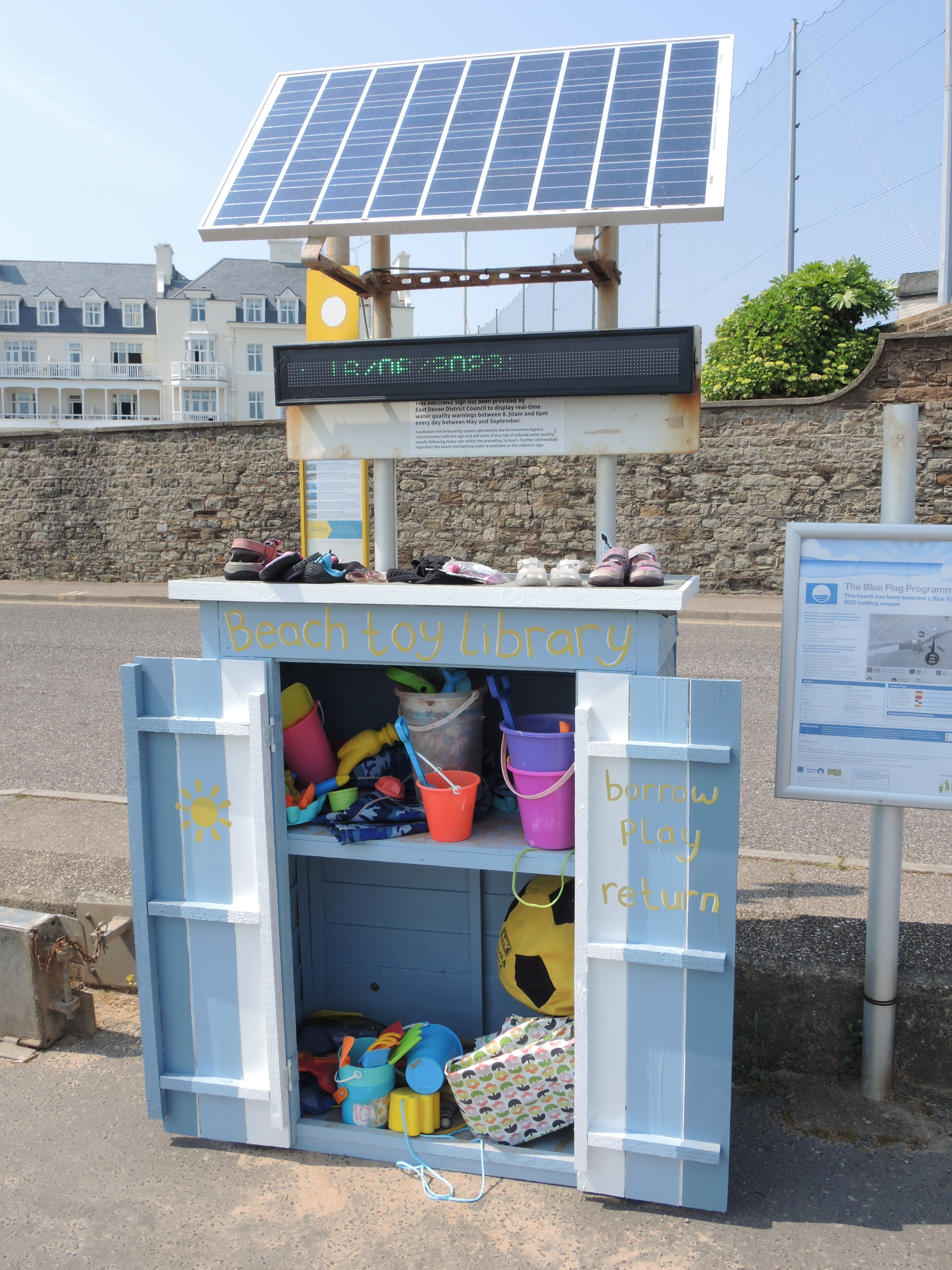
A beach toy library in the UK

== Types ==
Toy libraries can be run by volunteers, paid staff, or a mixture of both. They may be independent organisations or part of a larger one, such as a public library, government organisation, or charity.

Hospital toy libraries provide toys to children who are staying in hospital, which can improve mental health and development of children who are in hospital long-term. Beach toy libraries are a type of street library at beaches, which hold beach toy items and have no staff.

== Classification systems ==
Similar to the use of systems for the organization of book collections such as the Universal Decimal Classification (UDC Consortium) or the Dewey Decimal Classification, the French ESAR system classifies toys and games within toy library collections into four main areas: exercise, symbolism, assembly, and rules.

== History ==
Early toy libraries were primary for children with disabilities. By 1992 there was over 4500 toy libraries around the world.

=== North America ===
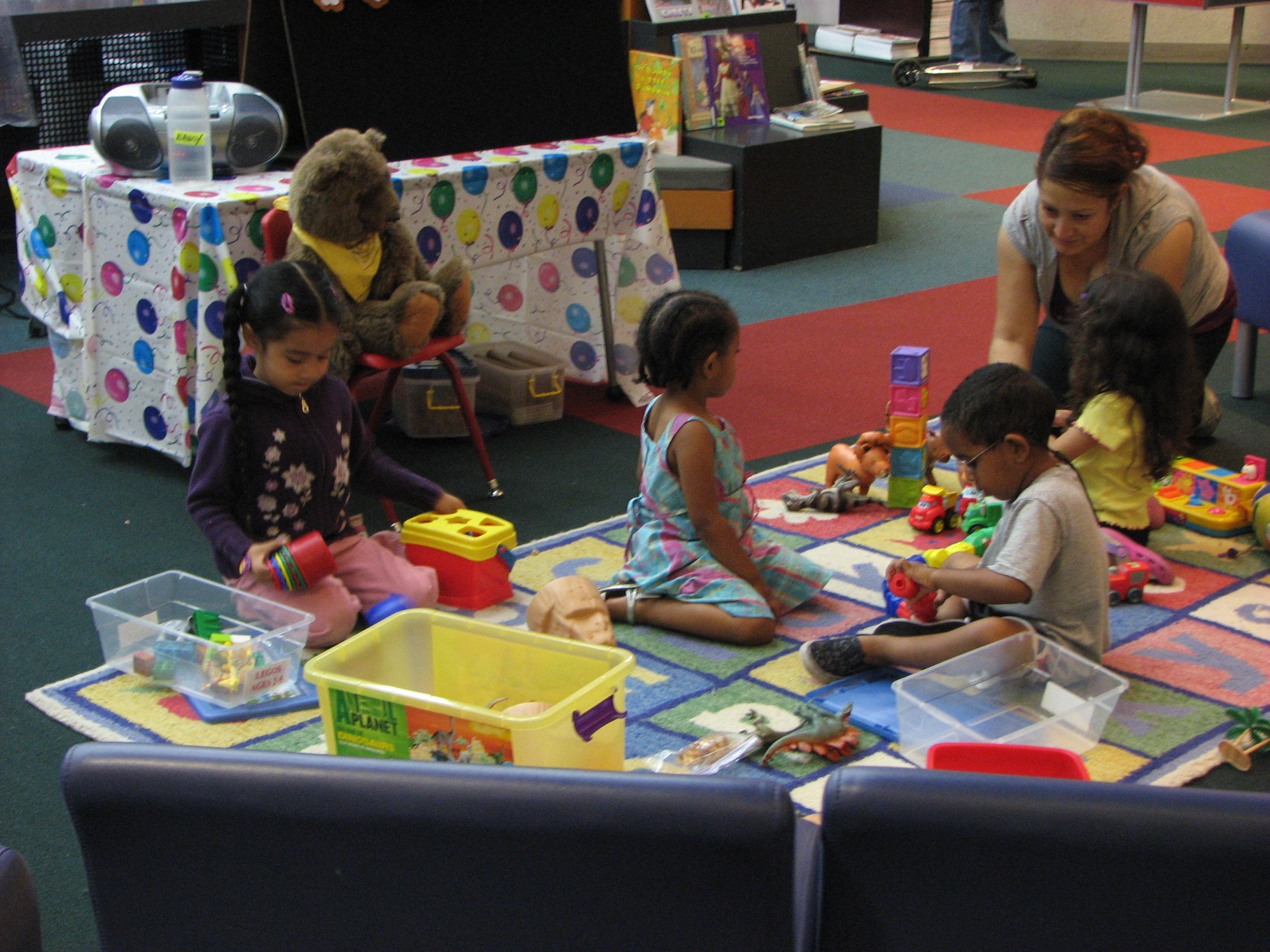
Children at a toy library in San jose

The first toy library in the United States was created in 1935, in Los Angeles by a toy shop that created a Toy Loan Programme during the Great Depression, after it was noticed that children were stealing toys because they could not afford them. The idea re-emerged and gained popularity in the United States in the 1960s and 70s with the passage of Head Start and the Individuals with Disabilities Education Act. The American Library Association established a "Toys, Games, and Realia Evaluation Committee" suting [sic?] this time. In 1984, The USA Toy Library Association was formed. In 2015, there were 400 toy libraries in the United States.

=== Europe ===
The first toy library in Sweden opened in 1963 in Stockholm by Stensland Junker, a professor of audiology and mother of two disabled children. It was called a "lekotek" - a combination of "lek" (play) and "bibliotek" (library). The lekotek was a combined preschool and toy library.

The first toy library in the United Kingdom opened by Jill Norris, which was based upon toy exchanges. In 1967, the first International Toy Library Conference was arranged in London.

France's first public toy library was built in 1967 by the Burgundian Cultural Association of Dijon. In the French-speaking world, where they are called "ludothèques". By 1979, France had 80 toy libraries. In 2013, the Association Ludotheques Francaises (ALF), headquartered in Paris, had 1200 member libraries.

=== Oceania ===
The first toy library in Australia was set up in 1971 by Annetine Forell in Melbourne, who discovered toy libraries on a visit to England. The Toy Libraries Association of Victoria was created in 1977, which became Toy Libraries Australia in 2012.

== See also ==
- Seed library
- Tool library
