= Halifax Tool Library =

- 44.656140°N 63.599475°W
- Location: 3115 Veith St, Halifax, NS B3K 3G9 (Around back in the sub basement), Canada
- Established: 2013
- Branches: 1

Collection
- Size: 1999

Access and use
- Population served: 414,400 (14th)
- Members: 500

Other information
- Director: Clay Radcliffe
- Employees: 0
- Website: The Halifax Tool Library

Halifax Tool Library (HTL) is a tool lending library based in Halifax, Nova Scotia, Canada. Members pay an annual subscription and may borrow specialized tools for home repair, maintenance, building projects, community projects, gardening and landscaping. The HTL is a registered Non Profit community organization in Nova Scotia. The HTL offers standard, Student/Low-Income option, and organizational memberships to non-profits and small businesses. The HTL is supported by the HRM Capital Grant program, Dalhousie University student union, the Veith House Society, Ecology Action Centre, Parker Street food & furniture bank, Forest Friend, Bike Again, North Brewing Company, Catalyst, Fusion HFX, Deiter's tool and Saw.

== History ==
In 2013, the HTL was cofounded by Kelly Schnare, Lars Boggild, Tristan Cleveland, and Neil Bailey under a shared belief in the sharing resource economy, as well as supporting local environmental initiatives. On May 10, 2014, the HTL successfully concluded a crowd-funding campaign to secure its start-up funding, raising more than $10,000. In June 2014, the HTL moved into 6070 Almon Street, Halifax NS. In October 2014 they had their grand opening and have been operating since. In 2017, following the volunteer corps extensive renovations of the basement floor (a 100 year old storage space) including the addition of the HTL's workshop space, the HTL relocated operations to Vieth House - 3115 Veith Street. . The HTL motto is "Putting underused tools in the hands of people who need them".

== Governance ==
The HTL is governed, using Sociocracy dynamic governance, by a Board Circle composed of seven citizen members who are responsible for the strategic planning, financial stability, and oversight the organization. A Membership Circle, overseeing the communications, membership and volunteer corps, and the Operations Circle, overseeing the physical space, inventory and processes, complete the administrative structure of the HTL to meet the requirements of the organization.

== Services ==
=== Collections ===
The tool library adapted Share Starter's free "Tool Library Starter Kit" which includes start up guidelines, frequently asked questions, and sample documents. The library uses "Local Tools" from "myTurn.com, PBC", a web-based inventory management system to track tool library members and to automatically display the tool availability online. The library has 1999 specialized tools from power drills, ladders and scaffolding, and pressure washers to loan to community members with all skill levels welcomed. The inventory of equipment includes automotive, bike, carpentry and woodworking, electrical and soldering, home maintenance, metalworking, plumbing, remodeling, sustainable living, and yard and garden. The types of equipment include: sensors, serving, hand tools, and power tools.

=== Training ===
The Halifax Tool Library offers affordable workshops open both to Tool Library members and the public on tool related skills and projects. In the Intro to Tools workshop, participants built a planter box; while in Routers 101, attendees created a cutting board and most recently they had a work shop for women, DIH (do it herself) where they learned tool literacy and how to make wooden crates.

== Mission ==
=== Tool library ===
Main tasks include tool lending for all kinds for use in volunteer projects, facility maintenance and improvement projects, community improvement events, and special events. Advocacy for community sharing and the timely return of borrowed tools, to guarantee the long-term sustainability of available inventory. The HTL also seeks compensation for lost tools and tools returned late. Routine maintenance and repairs on all equipment to ensure safe and operational condition and to extend the lifespan of the inventory also. All HTL functions are typically performed by volunteers.

=== Makerspace ===
Makerspace are places where people learn about technology, crafts and other kinds of making, share knowledge and skills with others and apply that knowledge and skill by creating things.

== Branches ==
- Halifax Tool Library, 3115 Veith St, Halifax, NS B3K 3G9 (Around back in the sub basement)

== See also ==
- List of tool-lending libraries
