= ToolBank USA =

ToolBank USA, Inc.
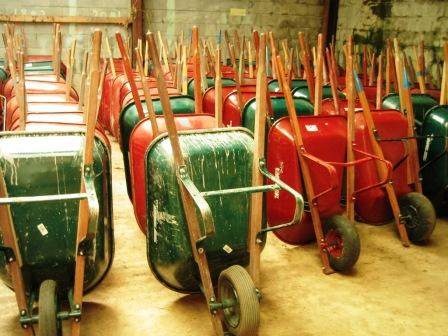
- Wheelbarrows lined up at a ToolBank
- Founded: 2008
- Type: 501(c)(3)
- Tax ID no.: 90-0386790
- Location: Atlanta, Georgia
- Coordinates: 33°39′04″N 84°30′46″W
- Origins: Community Reinvestment, Inc. Atlanta Community ToolBank
- Region served: Various US cities
- Board of directors: 12
- Key people: Patty Russart, CEO; Trey Bearden, CPO; Heidi Thompson, President
- Revenue: $929,376 (2020)
- Expenses: $950,463 (2020)
- Funding: Gifts; grants
- Employees: 5
- Website: toolbank.org

ToolBank USA is a not-for-profit organization based in Atlanta, Georgia with a mission to strengthen local communities through the establishment of ToolBank affiliates across the United States and the provision of infrastructure to support affiliates. ToolBank USA affiliates are tool lending resources that serve charitable organizations in their metropolitan areas. ToolBank USA affiliates are stand-alone entities not consolidated with the ToolBank USA. ToolBank USA was established as a not-for-profit organization on March 27, 2008, in Georgia.

== History ==
The Atlanta Community ToolBank, from which ToolBank USA grew out of, originated in Atlanta as an offshoot of a charitable no-cost home repair program known as Community Reinvestment, Inc. (CRI), founded in 1990. CRI's tool inventory grew organically as a result of volunteers donating equipment in support of the program. Local neighborhood associations and churches periodically borrowed CRI's tools for their own cleanup days and volunteer events, giving rise to the core concept of the ToolBank. CRI began offering the ToolBank as a formal program in 1992.

ToolBank USA was launched by founding grants from The Home Depot Foundation, The UPS Foundation, Stanley Black & Decker, Datapipe, and REM Enterprise Solutions.

=== ToolBank Trademark ===
ToolBank is a term trademarked for a nonprofit tool lending program model, in which a collection of tools are owned by a nonprofit organization, and lent exclusively to other charitable organizations, not individuals. The ToolBank program model differs from the similar but more broad tool library model, in which the tool collection is available to individuals. The ToolBank model was initially developed by the Atlanta Community ToolBank.

== Operations ==
Each ToolBank increases the impact of its local charitable sector by lending tools to organizations for use in the fulfillment of their missions. The available inventory of a typical ToolBank includes tools for landscaping, carpentry, plumbing, masonry as well as power tools, ladders, wheelbarrows, and others. The Atlanta Community ToolBank is currently the largest ToolBank with over 200 tool types in its lending inventory. Nine ToolBanks are currently lending tools in the cities of Atlanta, Baltimore, MD, Charlotte, NC, Cincinnati, OH, Houston, TX, Phoenix, AZ, Portland, OR, Richmond, VA, and Chicago, IL.

ToolBank inventories are designated for the purpose of increasing the impact of the nonprofit sector and less formalized grassroots organizations. Typical borrowers of ToolBank tools include faith-based organizations, public schools, neighborhood organizations, public/private partnerships with community-oriented missions, social clubs with a service mission, gardening clubs, and others. Proof of charitable intent is verified prior to accessing ToolBank tools.

ToolBanks perform three primary functions:

1. Tool Lending: The ToolBank lends tools of all kinds for use in volunteer projects, facility maintenance and improvement projects, community improvement events, and special events.
2. Tool Advocacy: ToolBank staff advocates for the complete and timely return of all borrowed tools, to guarantee the long-term sustainability of available inventory. Staff also seeks compensation for lost tools and tools returned late.
3. Tool Maintenance: The ToolBank performs routine maintenance and repairs on all equipment to ensure good condition and to extend the lifespan of the inventory. This function is typically performed by volunteers and community service workers.

=== ToolBank Disaster Services ===
In 2014, ToolBank USA launched ToolBank Disaster Services. ToolBank Disaster Services is a mobile tool-lending program that travels to areas effected by disasters to assist with response and rebuilding efforts of other not-for-profit organizations. It can equip thousands of volunteers with needed tools, post disaster, to respond to tragedies such as hurricanes, tornadoes, fires, and floods. Trailers carry various hand and power tools, along with personal protective gear. The program currently only operates within the United States and its territories.
