= Somerville Public Library =

Public library in Somerville, NJ

Coordinates: 40.5706°N 74.6197°W

Somerville Public Library was a public library of the Somerset County Library System of New Jersey located at 35 West End Avenue in Somerville, New Jersey. Centered at the end of Somerville's downtown Main Street, it was in the same building as the town's Borough Hall. The library offered books, movies, CDs, and periodicals. It also hosted special events, such as programs and lectures for each age group, as well as providing free WiFi access.

== History ==
When the area's first established public library started to outgrow its structure around 1900, plans were drafted to create a more permanent building for the library. However, as the town began to expand in population, the region focused on building churches, businesses, and a hospital. The idea of a larger building for the library was delayed until the Library's Board of Trustees could raise enough funds and gather support among the town's residents. Through funds collected from the public, the Trustees purchased a property lot on Maple Ave. Their idea of the perfect building would have large windows to let in the natural light from the sun and hired George B. Post to accomplish this dream. On April 14, 1902, the Library on Maple Ave opened its doors to the public.

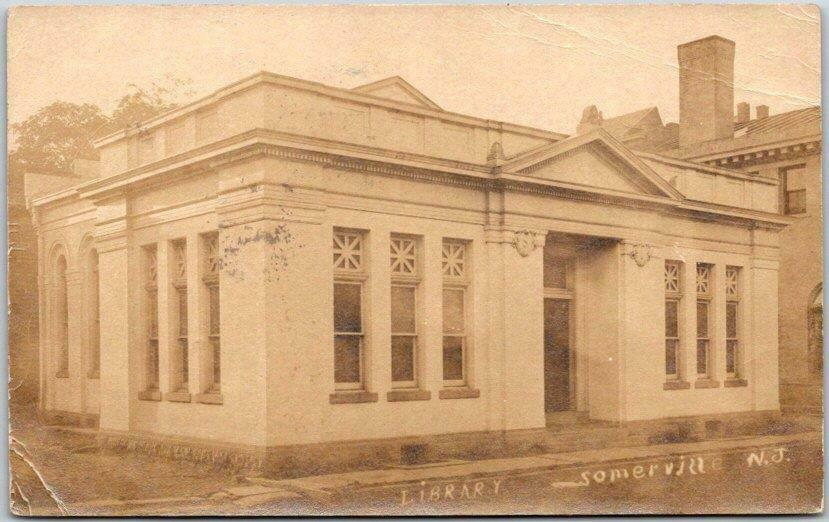
The library at 12 Maple Street was shown on a postcard mailed on December 15, 1904.

Just like knowledge grows, the Maple Ave location had to expand in 1924 in order to hold the growing number of books it housed. About four years later, the Library had to seek another building and was moved to the corner of Bridge and High Streets. While the Board of Trustees knew this was a temporary residence, it stayed in the Schwed building until 1958. Many plans were drawn up to find a more permanent place for the Library but the funding stalled many opportunities. It was not until 1956 when the Borough Council purchased the Elks Club building, located on West End Avenue, that the library found its permanent home. After much debate over the planned building, the Board of Trustees approved the new home in 1958. The Elks Club building is located at the end of Downtown Somerville and also houses the Borough Hall offices. More than fifty years later, the Library was still located in the Elks Club Building with no plans to move it.

== Services and programs ==
In addition to more than 50,000 books, the Somerville Public Library had many other services and programs for town residents. It held subscriptions to more than 100 magazines and newspapers, covering a spectrum of popular to niche categories. It also had a full selection of DVD movies and music, ranging from new releases to the classics. The library had photocopiers, offers Public Notary services, and provides free WiFi internet throughout the building.

They also hosted special events throughout the year for ages ranging from toddlers to senior citizens. They hosted Friday game nights for middle and high school students to interact and play video games in a safe environment and for younger children, they had storytime and arts and craft hours. The library also had film showings, talent shows, book signings, concerts and community outreach activities throughout the year. For the adults, the Somerville Public Library offered classes in chess, knitting, and other leisure activities, as well as workshops on a variety of topics and an adult literacy program.

== Friends of the Somerville Public Library ==
Founded around 25 years ago, the Friends of the Somerville Public Library is composed of people from various age groups. They work together on different projects throughout the year to raise funds and awareness for the library. The members volunteer their time to help operate the library and run library events.

== Closure ==
On July 22, 2026, an announcement was made that the Somerville library would close on July 31, 2026. Prior to closing, the former children's section (downstairs) was affected by mold and the upstairs section had become both the adult and children's section. Following closure, events and materials were moved to the Bridgewater library.
