= Tarea Hall Pittman =

American civil rights activist, broadcaster (1903–1991)

- Born: Tarea Susie Hall; 1903; Bakersfield, California, U.S.
- Died: July 31, 1991 (aged 87–88)
- Other names: Tarea Susie Hall–Pittman, Ty Hall–Pittman
- Education: San Francisco State University
- Occupation: Civil rights activists
- Known for: Director of the West Coast Region of the NAACP

Tarea Hall Pittman (1903 – July 31, 1991) was an American civil rights leader who served as President of the California State Association of Colored Women's Clubs from 1936 to 1938 and of the California Council of Negro Women from 1948 to 1951, and as Director of the West Coast Region of the NAACP from 1961 to 1965.

== Biography ==
Tarea Susie Hall was born in 1903, in Bakersfield, California, the second of five children born to William Hall and Susie Pinkney. Her father had moved from Alabama to Bakersfield in 1895 and made his living as a farm laborer. He helped his brothers found the Bakersfield Branch of the National Association for the Advancement of Colored People (NAACP).

Tarea Hall attended integrated public schools in Bakersfield and enrolled at the University of California, Berkeley in 1923. Because Black students were not allowed to reside in campus housing at that time, she used her personal connections to find accommodations. In 1927, she married William Pittman, a dental student, and dropped out of college to support him. Eventually, she enrolled in San Francisco State College (now San Francisco State University) and received her A.B. degree in social service in 1939.

Pittman became active in the NAACP and California State Association of Colored Women’s Clubs in the early 1930s, serving as president of the Association from 1936 to 1938. Her work with the Association included voter registration and funding orphanages for African American children.

In its inaugural year of 1936, Pittman organized west coast branches of A. Philip Randolph's National Negro Congress, which focused on the rights of African-Americans to fair employment, housing, union membership, educational opportunities, anti-lynching legislation, and ending police brutality. Tarea Pittman assisted in the creation of the Negro Education Council, which provided research for and funded Negroes in the News, a radio program devoted to publicizing positive news about the African American community. Pittman often hosted the program as well and became a recognized radio personality across the United States.

During World War II, Pittman was a social worker whose job with the Richmond Travelers Aid Society was to help Black workers arriving from the South for work in the shipyards settle their families into the area. She also organized protests against Kaiser Shipyards and other war industries in 1941 and 1942 to force them to hire African Americans.

After the war, Tarea Pittman was active in the California Council of Negro Women, serving as its president from 1948 to 1951. Because Black women were often obligated to work outside the home to help support the family, access to accessible, affordable childcare facilities was critical to Black families. When California state officials attempted to reduce, or even eliminate altogether, funds for childcare, Pittman and the California Council of Negro Women worked with other activists to press for expansion of the state’s childcare program. As a result, in 1957, California established a one-of-a-kind permanent childcare program.

Continuing her civil rights work, in 1952 Pittman played a key role in the desegregation of the Oakland Fire Department.

Working on behalf of the NAACP, Pittman became California’s first full-time lobbyist for fair employment practices. In 1959, California passed the California Fair Employment Practice act barring businesses and labor organizations from discriminating against employees or job applicants on the basis of their color, national origin, ancestry, religion, or race; and creating the Fair Employment Practice Commission dedicated to prohibiting discrimination in the workplace. Partly based on that success, Pittman served as Director of the West Coast Region of the NAACP from 1961 to 1965. During her tenure, the NAACP helped to get similar Fair Employment Practices laws passed in Arizona, Alaska, and Nevada. Pittman retired from the NAACP in 1970.

Tarea Hall Pittman died of a brain tumor at age 88 on July 31, 1991. Lawrence Crouchett, Director of the Center for African-American History and Culture, said, "She was the mother of the civil rights movement in California." She was said to have been an "integral part of the civil rights and social welfare movements in the Bay Area and the West Coast for much of the 20th Century."

ln 2015 the Berkeley, California city council voted to rename the city's South Branch Library in Pittman's honor after a community petition.
