= Tool library =

Lending library for tools

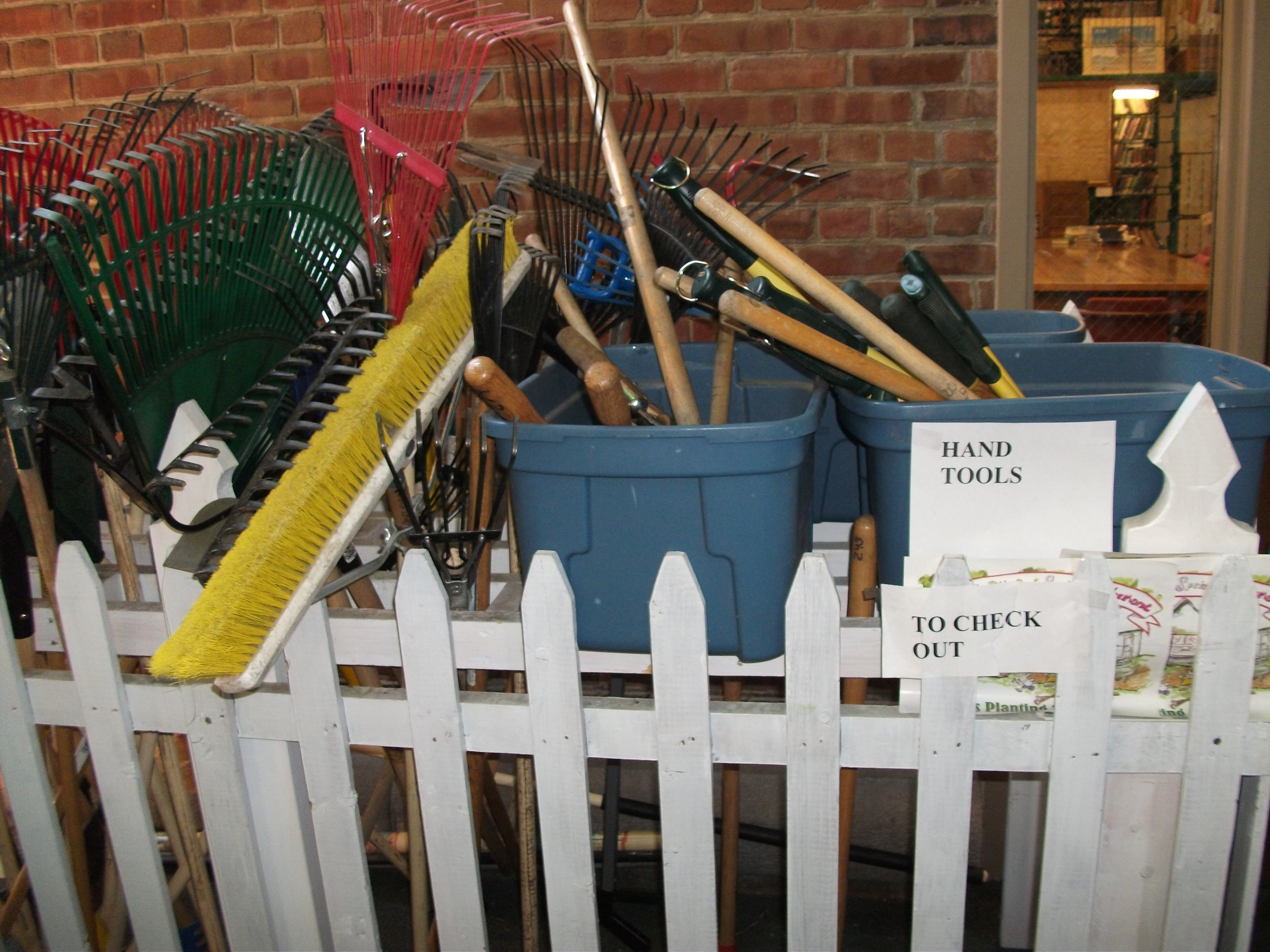
Tools available for borrowing at Fletcher Free Library, Burlington, Vermont, United States

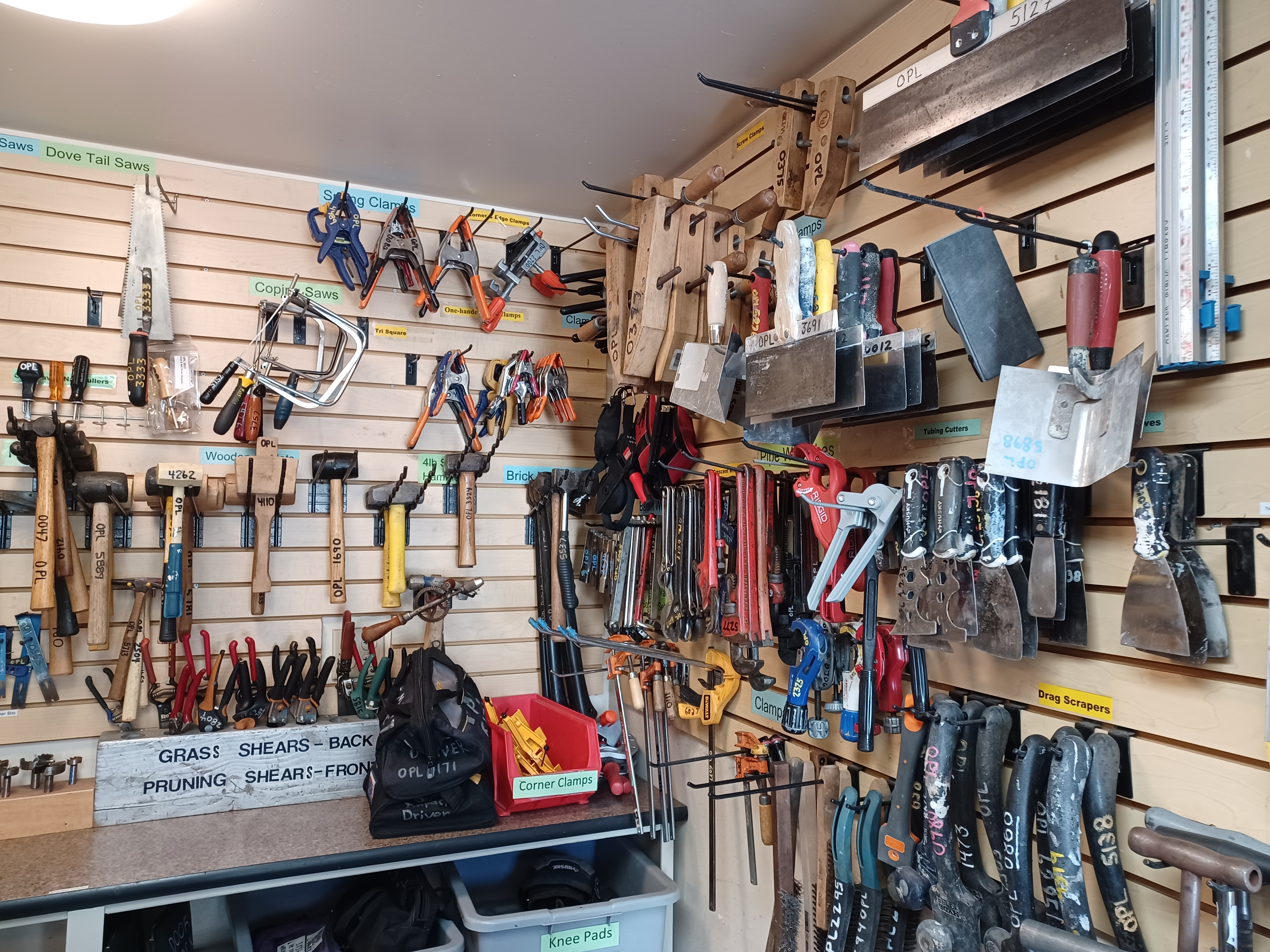
Tools available for borrowing at the Oakland Tool Lending Library in Oakland, California, United States

A tool library is an example of a library of things. Tool libraries allow patrons to check out or borrow tools, equipment and "how-to" instructional materials, functioning either as a rental shop, with a charge for borrowing the tools, or more commonly free of charge as a form of community sharing. This can empower residents who cannot afford specialized equipment for temporary projects to extend the life of their belongings, saving money and contributing to a more circular economy.

== History ==
The Grosse Pointe Rotary Club in Grosse Pointe, Michigan claims to have started the first tool lending library in 1943.

In the late 70s and early 80s, what could be considered the first generation of tool lending libraries got their start. In 1976 a tool lending library was started in Columbus, Ohio; originally run by the city, the tool library is now operated by ModCon Living, a non-profit organization that works to preserve and revitalize homes and communities in central Ohio. The ModCon Living Tool Library makes available over 4,500 tools free of charge to both individuals and non-profit organizations. The Phinney Tool Library was started at the Phinney Neighborhood Association (PNA) in north central Seattle in 1978, and the Berkeley Tool Library was started in 1979 in Berkeley, California. Many of these libraries were started with community block grants.

A variation of the tool lending library model began in Atlanta, Georgia in 1992. At the Atlanta Community ToolBank (now ToolBank USA), the tools are reserved for use only by nonprofits and other community-based organizations who are performing volunteer and facility maintenance projects. The ToolBank tool inventory is not available to individuals.

In 2009, the community of West Seattle in Washington started the West Seattle Tool Library, which provides a wide variety of tools and resources for individuals and organizations while specifically encouraging sustainable urban living. In 2011, Popular Mechanics recognized "Building a Local Tool Library" as one of its top ten ways to change the world, while highlighting the West Seattle Tool Library. In response to that recognition, a project called "Share Starter" was created that maps tool libraries worldwide and offers a free "Tool Library Starter Kit" to any community interested in starting a lending library of their own. The kit includes start up guidelines, frequently asked questions, and sample documents. Additionally, the Center for a New American Dream published a webinar which highlighted insights from a handful of tool libraries on how to get started.

== Spread ==
Given their increasing popularity and proven history of success, tool libraries and tool banks are now playing a role in the sharing economy and can be found in many local public libraries and makerspaces. Software platforms such as MyTurn have been developed for managing tool and other types of lending libraries.

Tool libraries also exist outside of the United States, with several in the UK, for example in Edinburgh, Glasgow and Liverpool, and in Norway. There also exist housing cooperatives with shared workshops, for example Kampen borettslag in Oslo. Vancouver Tool Library and Community Access Center (VTLCAC) in Vancouver, Washington offers individual project support and classes on woodworking and basic car maintenance.

== Equipment and facilities ==
=== Shared workspace ===
If a tool library chooses to host a shared workspace, some basic equipment can for example include worklighting, a workbench with vises, a woodworking bench, bicycle stand, bicycle pump, fire extinguishers, a vacuum cleaner, dustpans, brooms and a trash can.

=== Tools ===
The tool inventory is the most essential element of a tool library. Tools may be stored on shelves for members to access directly or behind a service counter for librarian access only. Tools must be numbered for cataloging, which is often done with lending software. What kind of tools a tool library should have varies with the community's needs.

- Durable tools that are useful for many situations as well as safety equipment are important.
- Specialized tools that are too expensive for many members to purchase individually or may only be used once or twice in a household are ideal for community lending. For example, a flooring installation kit may only be used once by a homeowner, but it can be reused by many different homeowners with shared access.

Many tool libraries accept donations of well-maintained tools to support their inventory. Inspection and testing is required to verify the functionality and safety of donated tools.

== See also ==
- Library of things
- Library makerspace
- Fab lab
- Hackerspace
