= Monuments and memorials in Canada removed in 2020–2022 =

A number of monuments and memorials in Canada were removed or destroyed as a result of protests and riots between 2020 and 2022. These included six sculptures of Sir John A. Macdonald, the first prime minister of Canada, three of other figures connected to the Canadian Indian residential school system (Alexander Wood, Egerton Ryerson and Joseph Hugonard), two of Canadian monarchs (Queen Victoria and Elizabeth II), one of the British explorer Captain James Cook and one of John Deighton ("Gassy Jack"), a bar-owner whose nickname inspired the name of Vancouver's Gastown district.

The initial protests in 2020 occurred in the context of the worldwide George Floyd protests, which resulted in the widespread removal of monuments and memorials in the United States and other countries connected to systemic racism. In Canada, the 2021 discovery of possible unmarked graves at former residential schools added to the conversation about systemic racism and the appropriateness of certain monuments.

== List ==
Monument/memorial	Location	Province	Removal announced	Removed	Means of removal	Notes	Ref.
A Canadian Conversation Sir John A. Macdonald Ruth Abernethy, 2015	Baden	Ontario	Jul 27, 2020	c. Sep 3, 2020	Put into storage	Wilmot Township Council voted on July 27 for the statue's immediate removal.	
Monument to Sir John A. Macdonald George Edward Wade, 1895	Montreal	Quebec	—	Aug 30, 2020	Statue toppled and decapitated by protesters	The toppling occurred during a Defund the Police protest; the statue had been a target of vandalism in the past. After three years of hesitation, it was announced the statue would not be reinstated.	
Statue of Sir John A. Macdonald Sonia de Grandmaison, 1966–1967	Regina	Saskatchewan	Mar 31, 2021	Apr 7, 2021	Temporarily put into storage	Regina City Council voted 7–4 to put the statue into storage while a new location is determined.	
Statue of Sir John A. Macdonald Mike Halterman, 2008	Charlottetown	Prince Edward Island	May 31, 2021	Jun 1, 2021	Formal removal by city council	Following the discovery of ground anomalies at the Kamloops Indian Residential School, First Nations protesters gathered for a vigil at the statue. Hours later, Charlottetown City Council voted to remove the statue. By 7am the next day, it was removed.	
Statue of Egerton Ryerson Hamilton MacCarthy, 1887	Toronto	Ontario	—	Jun 6, 2021	After repeated vandalism, the statue was destroyed by protesters; pedestal and base removed by university	The statue at Toronto Metropolitan University (formerly Ryerson University) was toppled and beheaded after a demonstration motivated by the ground anomalies discovered at the Kamloops Indian Residential School. University President Mohamed Lachemi announced that the statue "will not be restored or replaced".	
Holding Court Sir John A. Macdonald Ruth Abernethy, 2015	Picton	Ontario	Jun 8, 2021	Jun 9, 2021	Formally put into storage by city council	The council had voted to leave the statue in place in November 2020. In June 2021, it voted to remove the statue during an emergency session. In April 2022, it was decided to return the statue to its original donors, the Macdonald Project.	
Statue of Sir John A. Macdonald George Edward Wade, 1895	Kingston	Ontario	Jun 16, 2021	Jun 18, 2021	Temporarily put into storage	On June 16, Kingston City Council voted 12–1 to relocate the statue from City Park. Plans to relocate the statue at Cataraqui Cemetery were eventually rejected by the cemetery's board, and as of August 2023, no final decision has been made.	
Monument to Joseph Hugonard Charles Duncan McKechnie, 1927	Lebret	Saskatchewan	Jun 17, 2021	Jun 21, 2021	Put into storage	A protest camp had been set up at the site for some time until the Archdiocese of Regina agreed to the removal. The monument stands in a cemetery near the site of the Qu'Appelle Indian Residential School, which Hugonard helped found before becoming its first principal. There are no plans to install it elsewhere.	
Statue of Queen Victoria George Frampton, 1904	Winnipeg	Manitoba	—	July 1, 2021	Toppled and beheaded by protesters	During a protest on Canada Day, the statue outside the Manitoba Legislative Building was torn off its pedestal, splattered with red paint (which was also used to leave handprints on the pedestal) and beheaded. The head was thrown into the nearby Assiniboine River. Although initially the government intended to attempt repairing the monument, this was determined to not be possible. As of April 2023, no final decision has been made on whether to commission a new monument.	
Statue of James Cook Derek and Patricia Freeborn, 1976 (after John Tweed, 1912)	Victoria	British Columbia	—	Jul 1, 2021	Toppled by protesters and thrown in nearby harbour	On the night of July 1, the statue was thrown into the Inner Harbour, and its pedestal covered in red handprints. A makeshift statue of a red dress commemorating missing and murdered Indigenous women was put up in its place. Hours later, a totem pole in Malahat (30km away) was set on fire, apparently in retaliation for the toppling of the statue.	
Statue of Sir John A. Macdonald George Edward Wade, 1893	Hamilton	Ontario	—	Aug 14, 2021	Toppled by protesters	On July 8, Hamilton City Council voted 12–3 not to remove the statue in Gore Park. The Hamilton Indigenous Unity rally took place on the steps of Hamilton City Hall on August 14 to protest against this decision. After the rally, the protesters marched to Gore Park and toppled the statue.	
Statue of John Deighton ("Gassy Jack") Vern Simpson, 1970	Vancouver	British Columbia	Feb 14, 2022	Feb 14, 2022	Toppled by protesters	Toppled during the annual Women's Memorial March. Deighton married a 12-year-old Squamish girl.	
Statue of Alexander Wood Del Newbigging, 2005	Toronto	Ontario	—	Apr 4, 2022	Removed and destroyed	On June 8, 2021, the Church Wellesley Village Business Improvement Area (CWVBIA), which originally installed the statue, called for it to be removed. The CWVBIA removed and destroyed the statue on April 4, 2022.	

=== Restored monuments ===
Monument/memorial	Location	Province	Removal announced	Removed	Returned	Notes	Ref.
Statue of Queen Elizabeth II Leo Mol, 1970	Winnipeg	Manitoba	—	July 1, 2021 Toppled by protesters	June 2, 2023	Toppled in the same protest as that in which the statue of Queen Victoria was felled.	

== See also ==
- Canadian Indian residential school gravesites § Reactions
- George Floyd protests in Canada
- List of monuments and memorials removed during the George Floyd protests
- Removal of Confederate monuments and memorials § Canada
