= Statue of James Cook =

Statue of James Cook may refer to the following monuments to Captain James Cook:

- Statue of James Cook (Anchorage, Alaska),
- Statue of James Cook, Christchurch, New Zealand
- Statue of James Cook, Hyde Park, Sydney, Australia
- Statue of Captain James Cook, The Mall, London
- Statue of James Cook (Victoria, British Columbia)
- Statue of James Cook, St Kilda, Melbourne, Australia

== See also ==
- Category:Monuments and memorials to James Cook
