= John Deighton =

Canadian bar owner (1830–1875)

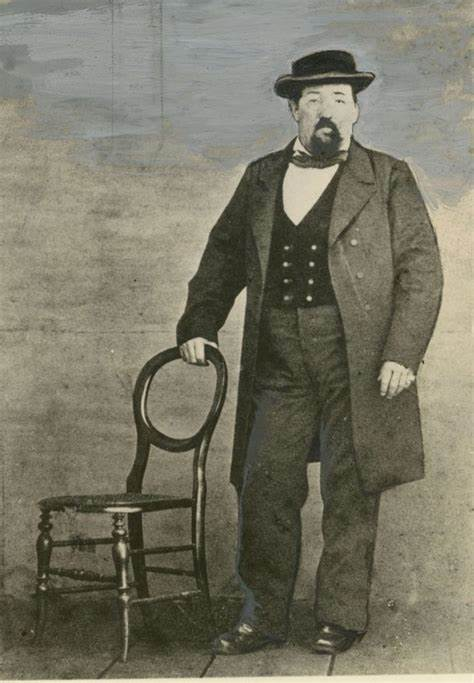
- Born: November 1830; Hull, Yorkshire, England
- Died: May 23, 1875 (aged 44); Granville, British Columbia, Canada
- Other names: Gassy Jack
- Occupation: Bar owner/steamboat captain
- Known for: Founding Gastown

John Deighton (November 1830 – May 23, 1875), better known as "Gassy Jack", was a bar-owner in British Columbia. The Gastown neighbourhood of Vancouver, British Columbia takes its name from him.

== History ==
Deighton was born in Hull, England. Growing up in Hull, a major seaport, Deighton and his brothers Tom and Richard learned to sail. Tom and Richard apprenticed on British ships, but Jack did not receive that opportunity. However, this meant he could switch to sailing on U.S. ships. When the California Gold Rush hit, ships were in demand to transport cargo and people from New York to San Francisco. In 1850, this voyage around Cape Horn took 140–160 days. Deighton signed up to work a new clipper Invincible that could sail 400 miles a day and made the trip in only 115 days. The next journey was to Hong Kong. Deighton was 21 years old and Third Officer. Next, Deighton visited family at home in England and then returned to the U.S., never returning to England again.

Next, Deighton worked a gold claim in California, along with many others, until February 1858 when there was news of gold further north in a British territory known as New Caledonia. The Fraser Canyon Gold Rush had begun and Deighton sailed north along with thousands of others. The harsh winter took its toll on the prospectors but Deighton stayed for 5 years. He found no gold, though others did. New Caledonia was now the Colony of British Columbia. Traffic on the Fraser River was increasing as more miners arrived, but so far only American steamers were able to travel beyond Langley. Local boats were built to meet this need and Deighton piloted steamships and sternwheelers on the Fraser River for several years.

By 1864, Deighton was forced to pursue other lines of work as he developed health problems (swelling of the legs and feet).

Between 1862 and 1867, he ran a bar called the Globe Saloon in New Westminster, British Columbia. It was quite prosperous due to the Cariboo Gold Rush. In 1867, when Deighton went out of town to visit the hot mineral springs near Harrison Lake, he entrusted the bar to an old shipmate, an American. On July 4, the celebrations got out of hand and Deighton returned to find his business ruined.

In 1867, Deighton opened a bar on the south side of Burrard Inlet at the behest of his old friend, Captain Edward Stamp, the owner of the Hastings Mill. He later named it the Globe Saloon in memory of his previous bar in New Westminster. He came to the area with little more than $6 to his name, a few simple pieces of furniture, his Indigenous wife (whose name has been lost to the years), and a yellow dog. The bar was built by idle sawmill workers in exchange for all the whisky they could drink in one sitting (the nearest drinking hole was 25 miles away). His patrons were mainly sailors and workers from the nearby sawmill. When business dwindled there, Deighton tried to acquire 20 waterfront acres near Moody's Mill and build a new saloon there. The local natives protested and the Governor agreed with them – Deighton went back to his previous bar, the Globe Saloon. This bar was demolished when the townsite of Granville was established. Deighton bought a nearby lot for $135 at the south-west corner of Carrall and Water Streets, where he built Deighton House.

Deighton was first married to a Squamish woman, whose name is currently unknown. Before her death around 1870, her niece, Quahail-ya, came to care for her. After her death, Deighton married Quahail-ya who was also known by the name Madeline Deighton. According to the 1921 Canadian Census, she was born in 1855 or 1856, but other sources suggest other dates. In 1940, she told Vancouver archivist Major J.S. Matthews that she was "about 12" when she married Deighton in 1870. Matthews reported that "it was difficult to converse." In 1946, after a portrait of her by Vancouver artist Mildred Valley Thornton was featured in the Vancouver Sun, she was described in an article as being "well over 90 years old." Newspaper stories on her death in 1948 noted she was "reputed to be over 100 years of age" and that she "claimed to be between 102 and 110 years of age."

A son, Richard Mason Deighton, was born to Deighton and his wife in December 1871; the baby was baptized in 1872. Richard was nicknamed the "Earl of Granville" and was a popular figure in Gastown. (In her 1940 interview with Major Matthews, Madeline said the baby lived about two years and was buried at Brockton Point, but in fact he outlived his father.) Deighton's brother Tom and his wife took over the business in 1873 and Deighton returned to working the steamship that plied the Fraser River, this time as a captain of the steamer Onward. However, after a family quarrel a few months later, he resumed management of the saloon and operated it until he became ill and died at the age of 44 on May 23, 1875. Deighton's will left everything to his four-year-old son, but Richard died in November 1875 before the will was probated. It is not known who inherited the $304, but Quahail-ya/Madeline was reimbursed for three months of childcare and the expenses of her son's funeral. She returned to the North Shore and married Billy Williams, who died in 1897. She died August 10, 1948.

== Legacy ==
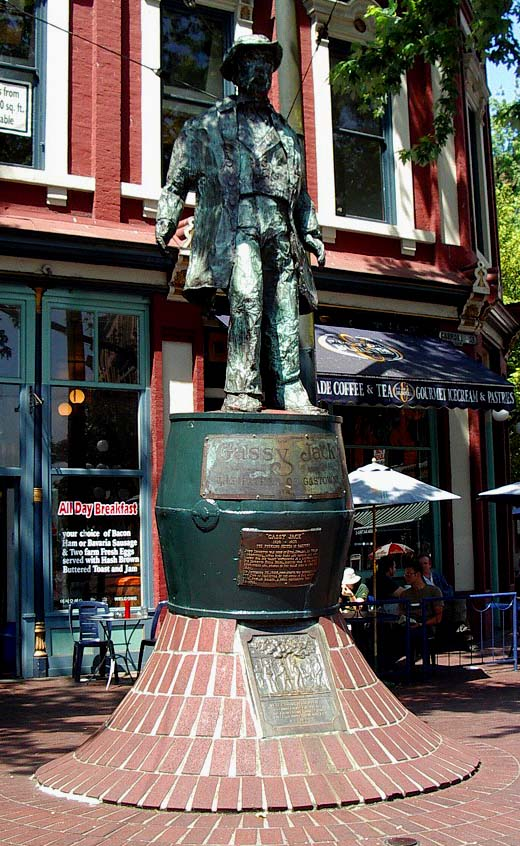
The statue of Gassy Jack

Deighton is interred at the Fraser Cemetery in New Westminster, British Columbia. A headstone was installed in 1972, reading "Here lies John 'Gassy Jack' Deighton, 1830 - 1875, Sailor, Prospector, Steamboatman, Pioneer, Hotelman at New Westminster & Granville: 'I have done well since I came here.'" The location of the monument is 49°13.322′N 122°53.815′W (WGS84).

Deighton was known as Gassy Jack because of his talkative nature and his penchant for storytelling. Locals called the area around his bar "Gastown" though its proper name at the time was Granville.

The Deighton House was later burned in the Great Vancouver Fire of June 1886.

In honour of Jack Deighton, the Gassy Jack statue stood in Maple Tree Square in Gastown which was the former site of his saloon, until it was toppled and covered with paint by demonstrators on February 14, 2022, during the 31st annual Memorial March for Missing and Murdered Indigenous Women and Girls.
