= Statue of John Deighton =

Statue formerly in Vancouver

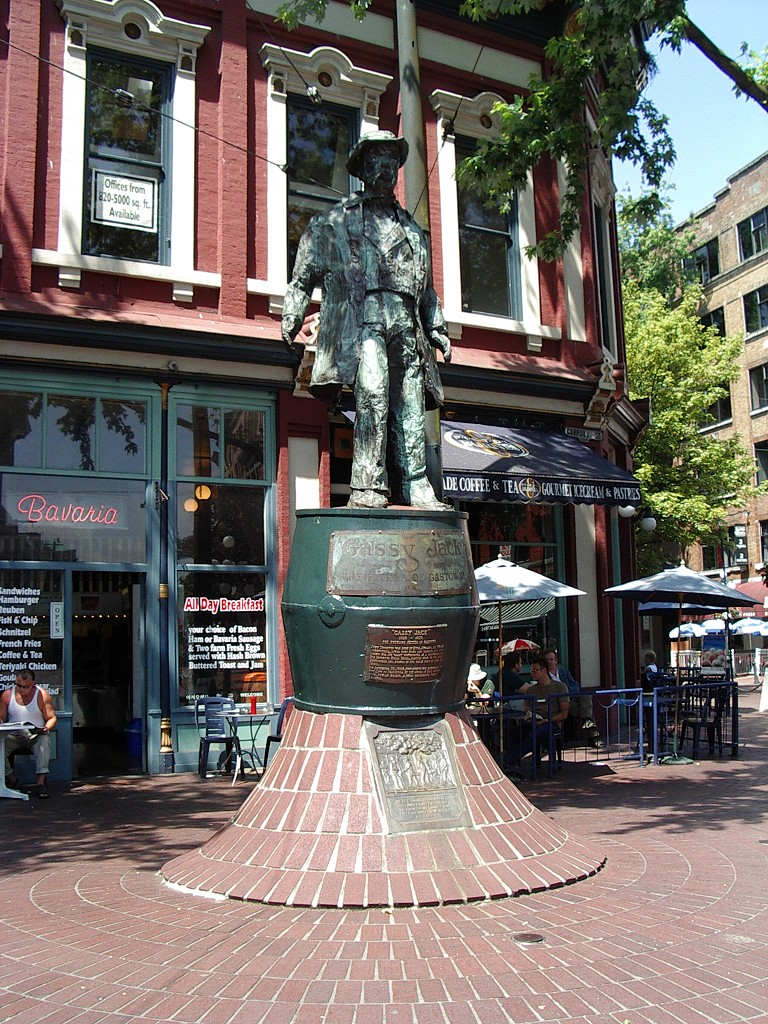
- The statue in 2003
- Artist: Vern Simpson
- Subject: John Deighton
- Condition: Removed
- Location: Vancouver, British Columbia, Canada; 49.283322°N 123.104257°W

A statue of John Deighton was commissioned in 1970 and was sculpted by Vern Simpson. Its location moved to various spots in Vancouver's Gastown neighborhood, in British Columbia, Canada. It was finally installed at a spot near where Deighton (also known as "Gassy Jack") had opened the Globe Saloon in 1867. On February 14, 2022, the statue was toppled by protesters.

== History ==
Deighton (November 1830 – May 23, 1875) was a Canadian bar owner who was born in Hull, England. He travelled to California and then New Caledonia (now British Columbia, Canada) as a gold prospector, before operating bars in New Westminster and later on the south side of Burrard Inlet. The area later became known as Gastown, from Deighton's nickname "Gassy Jack".

The statue was sculpted by Vern Simpson, after being commissioned in 1970 by a group of Gastown developers, and over the years, moved to various locations in Vancouver's Gastown neighborhood. It came to rest at the intersection of Carrall and Water streets, near where Deighton had built the Globe Saloon in 1867, one of the first buildings in Vancouver.

On June 16, 2020, the statue was splattered with red paint amidst growing calls to remove statues honoring colonialist or racist individuals. As reason for its removal, activists cited Deighton's marriage in 1870 to a 12-year-old Squamish girl named Quahail-ya. A petition calling for its removal garnered over 1,500 signatures in five days, eventually reaching over 23,000 signatures. It was toppled on February 14, 2022, by protesters during the 31st annual Women's Memorial March for Missing and Murdered Indigenous Women and Girls. The pedestal was removed on April 4, 2022.

== See also ==
- Monuments and memorials in Canada removed in 2020–2022
