= Hastings Mill Park =

Park in Vancouver, Canada

- Official Name: Hastings Mill
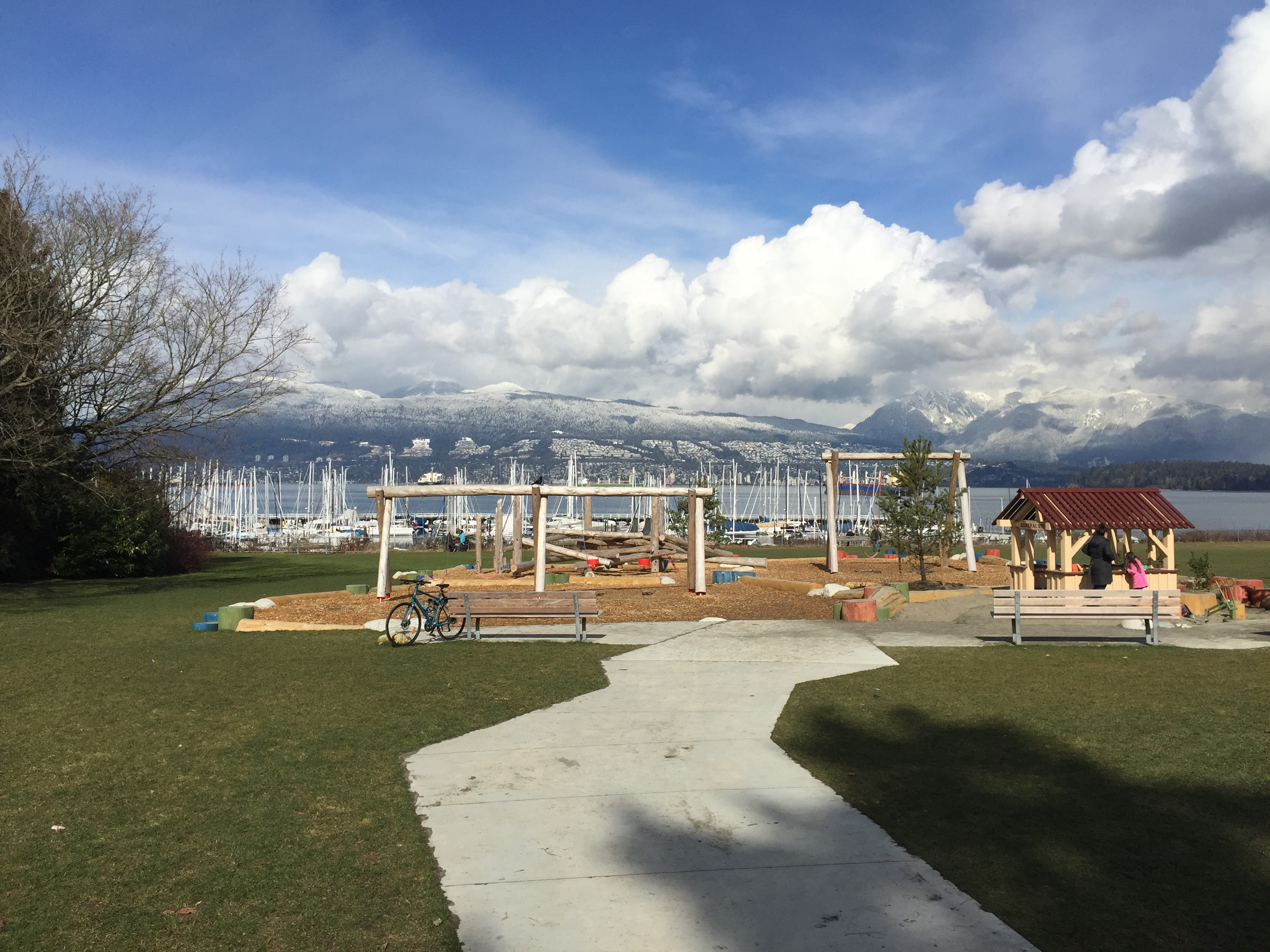

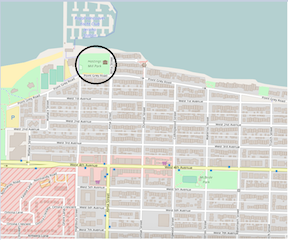
- Type: Urban park
- Location: 1575 Alma St. V6R 3P3
- Nearest city: Vancouver, Canada
- Coordinates: 49°16′22″N 123°11′12″W
- Created: 1913
- Owner: Vancouver Park Board
- Designation: 1975

Hastings Mill Park is located on the waterfront in the West Point Grey neighbourhood of Vancouver, British Columbia, Canada, and has recently received an upgrade from a joint partnership between the Vancouver Park Board and local landscape architects at PWL Partnership. The renewed playground was built to engage a wider age range of children and to bring historical significance to the on-site Hastings Mill Museum which showcases Vancouver's logging history.

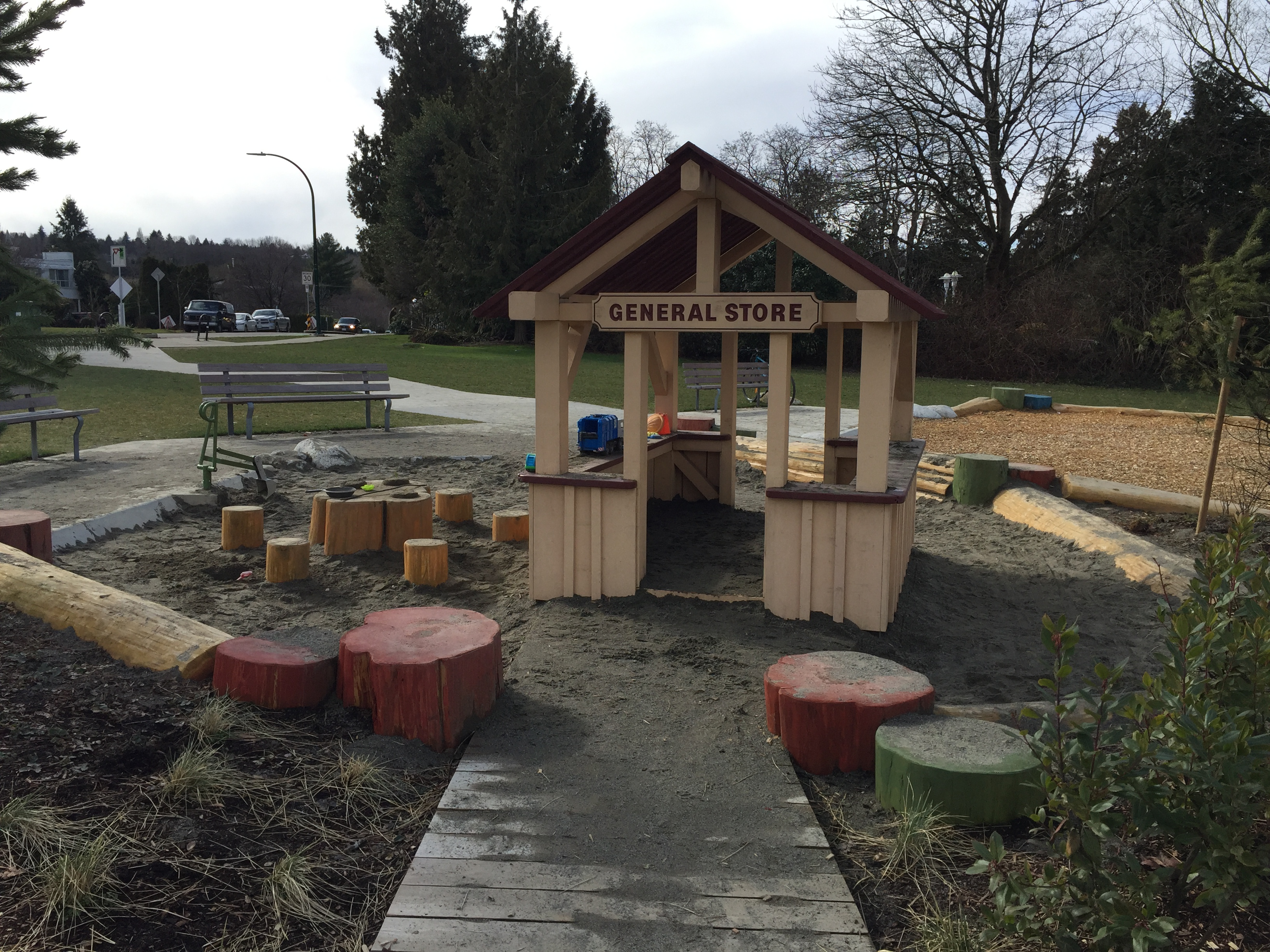
Close up of kids' play area at the park

== History ==
The historic site of Hasting Mills Museum, is what draws significance to the park. The land where the museum resides was originally owned by the Provincial Government. The building that hosts the museum was originally the Hastings Mill Store, the first general store erected in Vancouver in 1865 by British Captain Edward Stamp's British Columbia and Vancouver Island Spar, Lumber and Sawmill Company. This building was one of the few buildings to survive the Great Fire of 1886 and was moved from the burrard inlet by barge to its current location at the foot of Alma Street by the Native Daughters of British Columbia. The museum was officially dedicated as a museum of B.C. historical relics in memory of the pioneers in 1932 and currently shows a wide range of First Nations artifacts as well as photographs from the Vancouver Pioneer Association.

The Museum is open Tuesday-Sunday 1-4 pm and is closed during the months of December and January.

== Construction ==
The Vancouver Park board collaborated with the architects at PWL Partnership in order to build a new playground which would be more child friendly and suitable for a wider range of ages. A public open house was conducted in the summer of 2015 in order to gain feedback from the community into the new design. The renovated playground opened in the fall of 2016 and now consists of two tall swings, two toddler swings, two standard swings, adventure log playground and a new playhouse with a sand area. The new playground is made entirely out of wood logs and timber to recall the history of the city's logging pioneer community.

== Surrounding facilities ==
The Royal Vancouver Yacht Club, Jericho Tennis Club, Jericho Park and Beach are all located within walking distance from the park. Located at Jericho Park and Beach are public bathrooms, pay parking, a concession stand, and various sports fields such as a basketball court and soccer fields.

A bike path connects to the Hastings Mill park. This path connects to most of Vancouver's bike paths and can take visitors towards Pacific Spirit Regional Park or into Downtown Vancouver and is said to be 'comfortable for all ages' and abilities.
