= Gastown =

Neighbourhood in Vancouver, Canada

- Neighbourhood
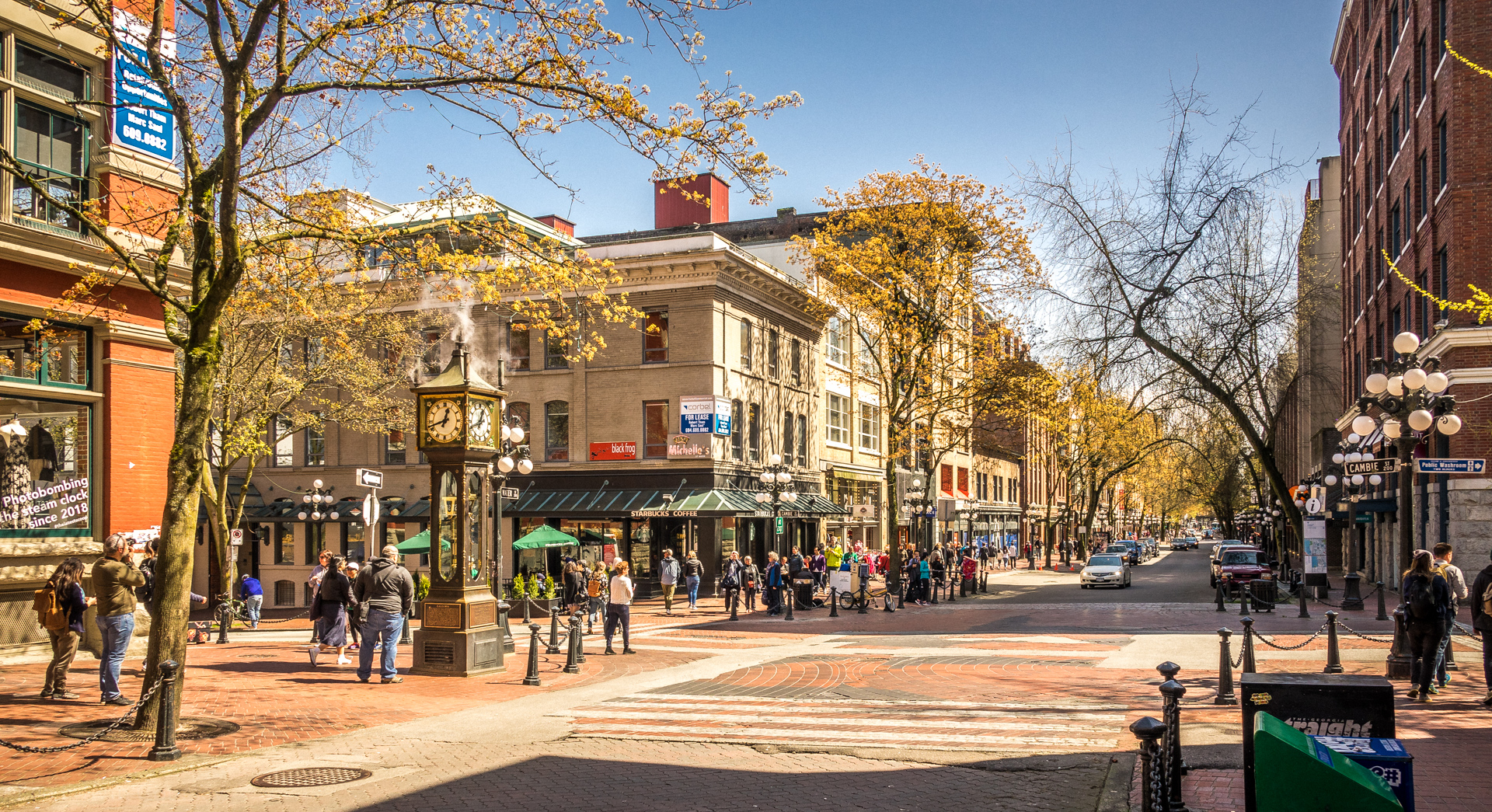
- The steam clock at the intersection of Water and Cambie Streets in 2018

- Location in Metro Vancouver
- Coordinates: 49.284688°N 123.110953°W
- Country: Canada
- Province: British Columbia
- City: Vancouver
- Website: gastown.org

Gastown is the original settlement that became the core of the city of Vancouver, British Columbia, Canada, and a national historic site and a neighbourhood in the northwest section of the Downtown Eastside, adjacent to Downtown Vancouver.

Its historical boundaries – the waterfront (now Water Street and the CPR tracks), Carrall Street, Hastings Street, and Cambie Street – followed the borders of the 1870 townsite survey, the proper name and postal address of which was Granville, BI ("Burrard Inlet"). The official boundary does not include most of Hastings Street except for the Woodward's and Dominion Buildings, and stretches east past Columbia Street, to the laneway running parallel to the west side of Main Street.

== History ==
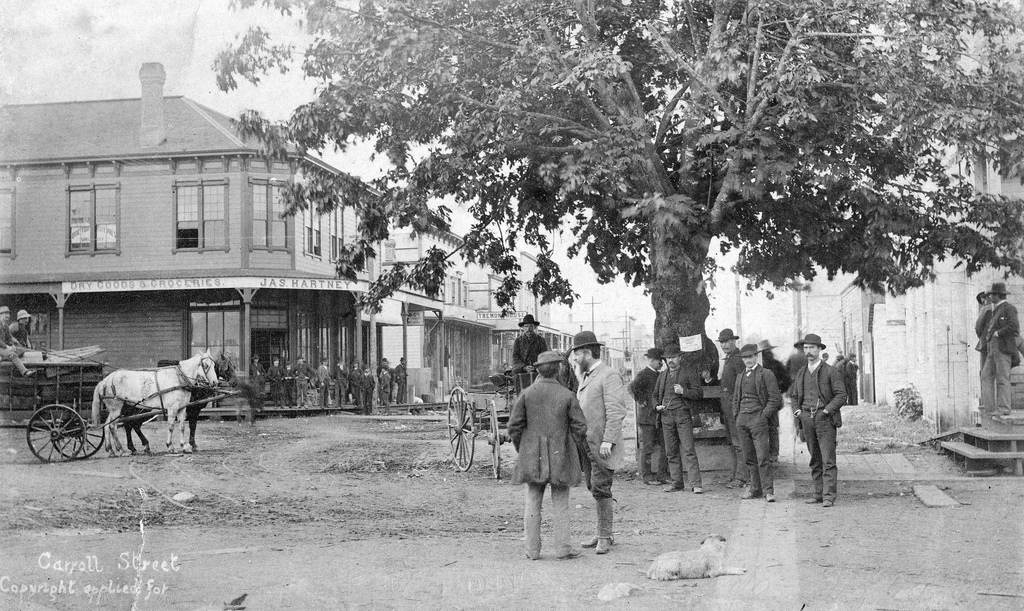
View of Gastown from Carrall and Water Street in 1886. Named after John Deighton, Gastown was Vancouver's first downtown core.

Gastown was Vancouver's first neighbourhood and was named for "Gassy" Jack Deighton, a Yorkshire seaman, steamboat captain and barkeep who arrived in 1867 to open the area's first saloon. He was famous for his habit of talking at length (or "gassing") and the area around his saloon came to be known as Gassy's town, a nickname that evolved to Gastown. The town soon prospered as the site of Hastings Mill sawmill, a seaport, and quickly became a general centre of trade and commerce on Burrard Inlet, as well as a rough-and-rowdy resort for off-work loggers and fishermen as well as the crews and captains of the many sailing ships which came to Gastown or Moodyville, on the north side of the inlet (which was a dry town) to load logs and timber.

In the 1960s, citizens became concerned with preserving Gastown's distinctive and historic architecture, which, like the nearby Chinatown and Strathcona, was scheduled to be demolished to build a major freeway into the city's downtown. A campaign led by businesspeople and property owners, as well as the counterculture and associated political protestors, gained traction to save Gastown. Henk F. Vanderhorst, a Dutch immigrant to Canadian citizen, opened the "Exposition Gallery", an art gallery on Water Street which started, flourished and encouraged a flow of other fledgling business startups to boom in the Gastown core. His influence with the revitalization of Gastown was acknowledged in 1976 by being awarded "The First Pioneer Citizen of Gastown" award by Mayor Art Phillips. Vanderhorst's efforts, in part, pressured the civic, provincial and federal governments to declare Gastown a historic site, protecting its heritage buildings to this day.

Gastown was designated a National Historic Site of Canada in 2009.

== 21st century ==
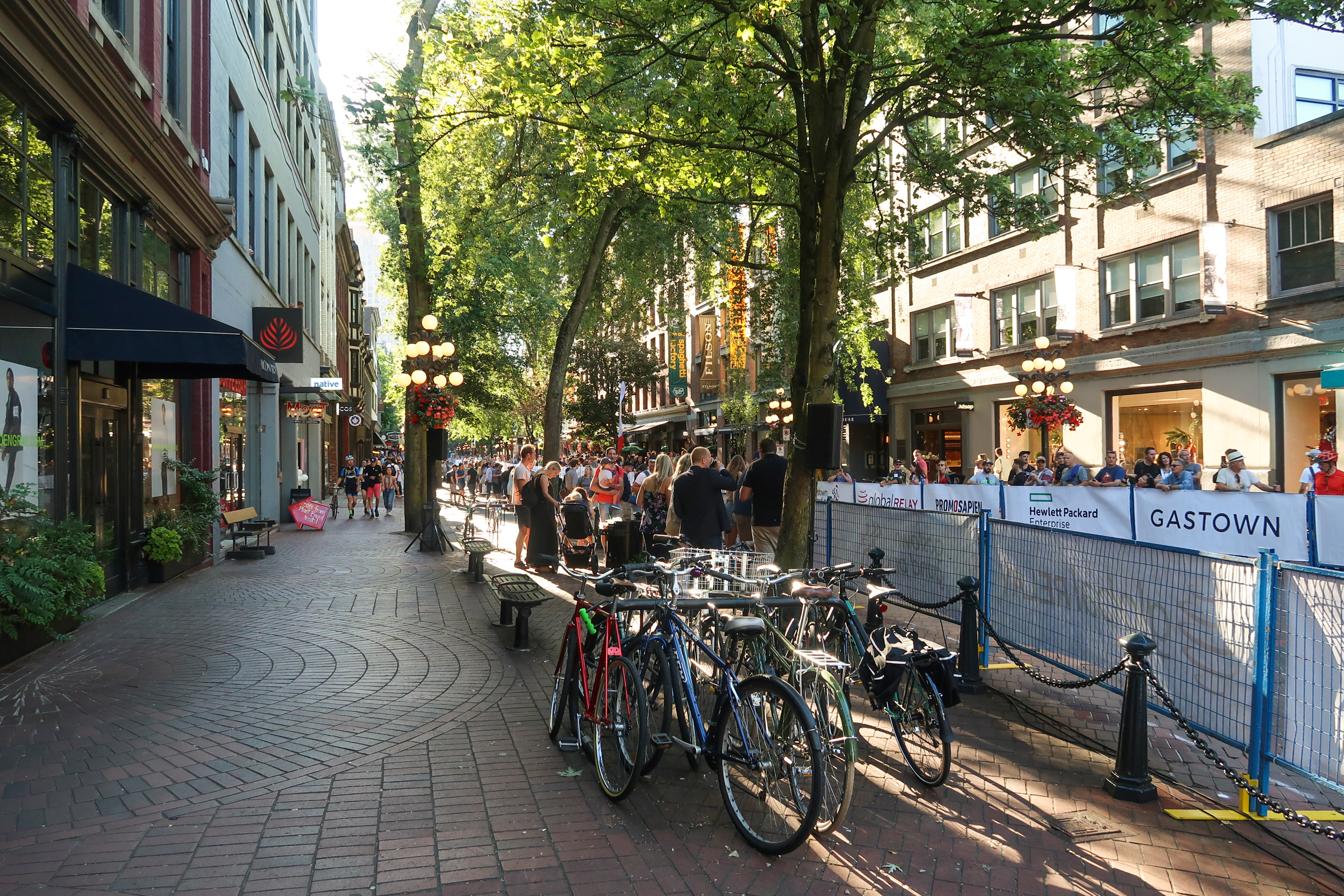
Water Street is presently made up of fashion and interior furnishing boutiques, tourist-oriented businesses, restaurants, and nightclubs.

In February 2013, the Gastown Gazette began publishing local news and stories about the ongoing protests against gentrification in the Downtown Eastside and Gastown area of Vancouver. The community paper has since gathered provincial and national attention for reports on the neighbourhood.

Gastown has become a hub for technology and new media. It has attracted companies such as Zaui Software, Idea Rebel, MetroQuest, BootUp Labs Entrepreneurial Society, SEOinVancouver and MarketR.

Popular annual events that take place on the cobblestone streets of Gastown include the Vancouver International Jazz Festival and the Global Relay Gastown Grand Prix international bicycle race.

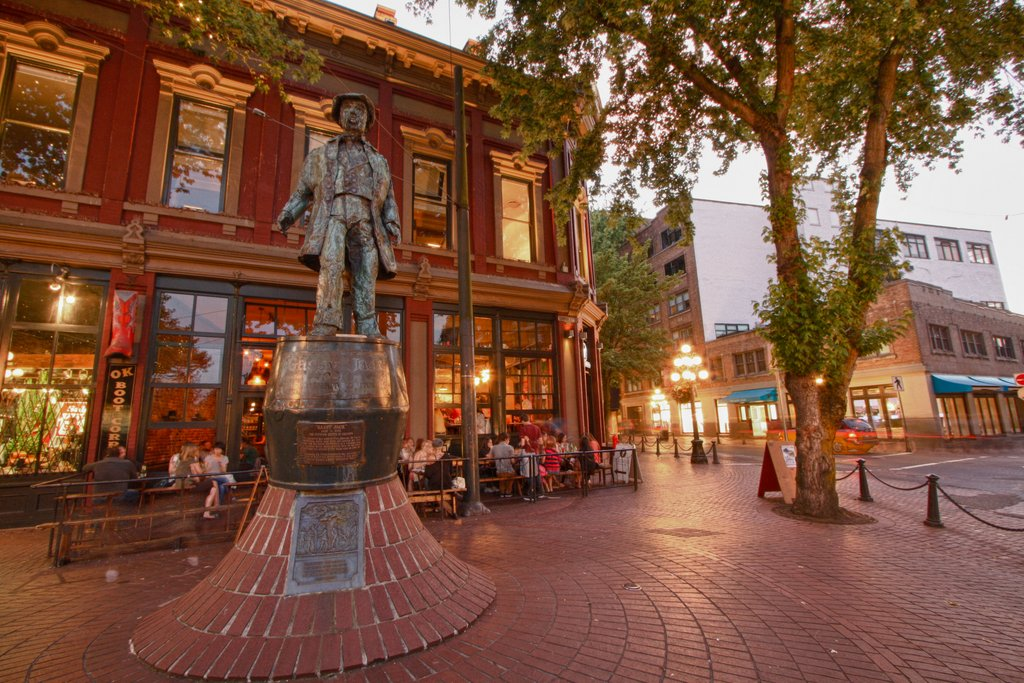
The Gassy Jack statue in Maple Tree Square in 2012, before its removal in 2022

In June 2004, Storyeum opened in Gastown. It was a lively 65-minute theatrical show that re-enacted the history of BC using eight sets that were all located below street level. Unfortunately, due to mounting debt, the attraction closed its doors in October 2006.

The Gassy Jack statue was toppled on February 14, 2022, by protesters during the 31st annual Memorial March for Missing and Murdered Indigenous Women and Girls.

In mid-2024, as a pilot project, Water Street was converted into a pedestrian zone with car-free and car-light areas from Richards Street to Carrall Street.

=== Gastown steam clock ===
Gastown's most famous (though nowhere near oldest) landmark is the steam-powered clock on the corner of Cambie and Water Street. It was built in 1977 to cover a steam grate, part of Vancouver's distributed steam heating system, as a way to harness the steam and to prevent street people from sleeping on the spot in cold weather. Its original design was faulty and it had to be powered by electricity after a breakdown. The steam mechanism was completely restored with the financial support of local businesses as it had become a major tourist attraction, and it is promoted as a heritage feature although it is of modern invention.

The steam used is from a low-pressure downtown-wide steam heating network (from a plant adjacent to the Georgia Viaduct) and powers a miniature steam engine, in the base of the clock, driving a chain lift. The chain lift moves steel balls upward, where they are unloaded and roll to a descending chain. The weight of the balls on the descending chain drives a conventional pendulum clock escapement, geared to the hands on the four faces. The steam also powers the clock's sound production, with whistles being used instead of bells to produce the Westminster "chime" and to signal the time.

In October 2014, the clock was temporarily removed for major repairs by its original builder, and it was reinstalled in January 2015.

== Archival photos ==
- View of Gastown from offshore, 1884, prior to announcement of CPR terminus
- View of Gastown from offshore, 1886
- View of Alexander Street, Gastown c.1911
- View of Water Street from jct. Cordova Street, c.1890
- View of Water Street from Maple Tree Square, 1887 (Sunnyside Hotel at right)
- View of Cordova Street from above intersection of Carrall; July 1, 1890 Dominion Day celebrations
- View of Cordova Street from above intersection of Cambie; c.1900 when this was still the city's principal shopping district
