= Storyeum =

- Established: 2000-2006
- Location: Vancouver, British Columbia Gastown's Water Street in Canada.

Storyeum was a short-lived tourist attraction, located at 142 Water Street, Vancouver. Storyeum was located in the largely touristy area of the Gastown neighbourhood of Vancouver, British Columbia, Canada. Storyeum offered up a live, interactive, educational, re-creation of British Columbia's history through special effects, actors and actresses in a 65-minute show.

Storyeum, in the wake of diminishing profits and revenue, ran its last show on October 17, 2006. The City of Vancouver continued as the property landlord and occasionally rented parts of the space for events such as Vancouver Fashion Week, the Juno Awards After Party, Vancouver Film School projects, and entertainment and cultural celebrations.

The space sits underneath the Woodward's parkade and with the city's largest revitalization project underway across the street, the Storyeum site has been divided into two retail spaces. At 142 Water Street a German/Iranian furniture store now occupies 12,000 square feet (1,100 m^{2}), and at 151 West Cordova Street, W2 Community Media Arts is operating Storyeum as a 31,000-square-foot (2,900 m^{2}) conference and festival venue, titled W2 Storyeum. Whereas the venue previously housed heritage displays and gift shops aimed at tourists, it now plays host to a community media lab, cafe, art studio, exhibition space, offices, and community meeting room.

Excalibur Entertainment (of Surrey, BC) proposed to turn the basement into a 40+ lane bowling alley but their business model was incumbent upon securing a ground floor liquor permit. This combination made the idea unlikely to occur with the new Woodward's across the street that has a 150-seat restaurant and bar. Creditors went through the approximately 70,000-square-foot (6,500 m^{2}) basement in 2006 for auctionable value. The space is currently being used by Vancouver Film School for student and small production sets, including green screens and one-take live action shots.

== History ==
Storyeum's main entrance as seen from Vancouver Gastown's Water Street

The Storyeum concept was officially conceived in 2000 by its founder Danny Guillaume and architect Al Waisman. To help fulfill their concept, they founded Historical Xperiences Inc. (HXP) to create and manage Storyeum. Storyeum officially opened in June 2004. Many local businessmen and the City of Vancouver invested over CAD $22 million into the concept, but not enough people visited the attraction, and Mr. Guillaume owed his creditors over CAD $6 million when Storyeum closed.

== Facts ==
- Storyeum was bigger than six NHL regulation size ice rinks, 104,000 square feet (9,700 m^{2}).
- Storyeum was one of the biggest tourist attractions built since EXPO 86.
- The passenger lifts used in the first and last set were some of the world's biggest.
- The passenger lifts were capable of transporting 200 people or 25,000 pounds. Made up of Module Lift units made up of rotating horizontal and vertical plates, units were approx 8in tall .
- Storyeum's replica locomotive in Set No. 7 was an exact replica of the Canadian Pacific Railway Locomotive#374, the first to pull passenger cars across Canada.
- Storyeum initially was a CAD $22 million private investment project and was built in 6 months.

== The show ==
The theatrical adventure predominantly took place under the streets of Gastown. The entire show duration was approximately 65 minutes. Storyeum broke from the traditional performance/play by making guests move from set to set. In total, there were eight sets, including the 360 degree visual demonstrations in the two passenger lifts.

The Storyeum experience started when guests entered the first passenger lift to descend below the grounds of Gastown. Upon descent, they were guided from set to set. The sets are, in order of appearance:

1. GOING UNDERGROUND — introductory visual presentation into Canada and Vancouver's values and brief overlook into pivotal moments of Canadian history. Moments include Terry Fox run, EXPO 86, Men's and Women's Hockey Team Canada winning Olympic Gold Medals in Salt Lake City, U.S., Vancouver being awarded the rights to host the 2010 Winter Olympics, etc. Brief safety and courtesy guidelines are also presented.
2. ANCIENT TRAILS — first of the real sets involving British Columbia's story with real actors/actresses, sets and special effects. Guests experience the retelling of the creation of man, from wolf, and woman, from bottom of the sea sediments, through the point of view of the British Columbia Tsleil-Waututh native people in a rainforest-like setting; presumably being British Columbia's coastal temperate forests.
3. THE BIG HOUSE — Guests here experience the love story of the first descendants of the man and woman created in the second set. Taking place over many years, the story marks the finish of the Great Circle of Life.
4. NEW ARRIVALS — there are two versions of this set that is alternated between seasons. However, the set story remains to be the same, only the physical point of view is alternated between. One version gives the guest a vantage point of looking at a ship while it is coming into harbour in a first contact type scenario between Europeans and the indigenous people. The second version is from the vantage points of actually being on the ship as it comes into harbour during a similar first contact type scenario. In this set, guests are told of the establishment of the Hudson's Bay Company of Canada. There is also mention of fur trading, introduction of small pox, and long-distance relationships between sailors and their loved ones in Europe. During special holidays such as British Columbia's Victoria Day, other issues presented in a satirical yet educational atmosphere include addressing present-day Canadian and American differential sentiments and the use of the 49th parallel to set much of the border between the United States of America and Canada.
5. GOLD SEEKERS — taking place circa 1862 in Barkerville, British Columbia, covers the Gold Rush of the Pacific North-West particularly its role in British Columbia. Other issues covered include: the Royal Decree to unite and confederate Canada, the Barkerville fire, law and order issues in the remote vastness of British Columbia, and the low female to male ratio.
6. NATIONAL DREAM — In this set, guests experience the unification of Canada by a national rail line spanning the nation from coast to coast. Other issues presented include the Women's Suffrage in Canada, the role of the Chinese in building the railway, and the Chinese Head Tax.
7. LAST STOP — This set's story takes place at a railway station. The set is presumably set in Vancouver because of a replica Gastown Steam clock present on set. In this part of the experience, circa 1944, guests see a Canadian soldier, waiting at the station to depart for reconstruction efforts in Italy, with a wife waiting for her husband, who is a Canadian Forces soldier, return from fighting in Europe. As the show progresses, a replica Canadian Pacific Railway locomotive steams into the station with the husband. The set ends with a grand musical performance with underlying feelings of promoting multiculturalism and acceptance. This set marks the end of the experience with real actors/actresses, sets, and special effects.
8. BC SPIRIT — In this last set, guests enter a passenger lift to return to street level. During the ascent, a visual mosaic of individuality and society cohesiveness is celebrated. The end of the presentation officially marks the end of the Storyeum experience.
