= W2 Community Media Arts =

The W2 Community Media Arts is a non-profit media arts organization in Vancouver, British Columbia located in the Downtown Eastside. The organization is developing a 8,800 square feet (820 m^{2}) media arts organization in the new Woodward's building with Performance Space/Venue, Crossmedia Lab, community TV studio, FM radio station, Letterpress Studio, The Kootenay School of Writing (KSW), Interactive Media Installations, and a social enterprise, the W2 Café.

Its present location is at 151 West Cordova Street, the former home of Storyeum. Once the permanent facility in the Woodward's development is completed, W2 will make its final home there. After many delays, the expected move in date will be in Fall of 2010.

== History ==
The W2 project was conceived in 2003. W2 has occupied several temporary locations while waiting for the completion of the final destination in the renovated heritage Woodward's building.

== Facilities ==
The current location, on the main floor of the West Cordova Street side of the former Storyeum, boasts 31,000 square feet (2,900 m^{2}) of space, which is used for art display and installations, events and performances.

Artist rendering of the future W2 Café space in the Atrium of the new Woodwards.
