= Statue of James Cook (Victoria, British Columbia) =

Former public statue in Victoria, British Columbia, Canada

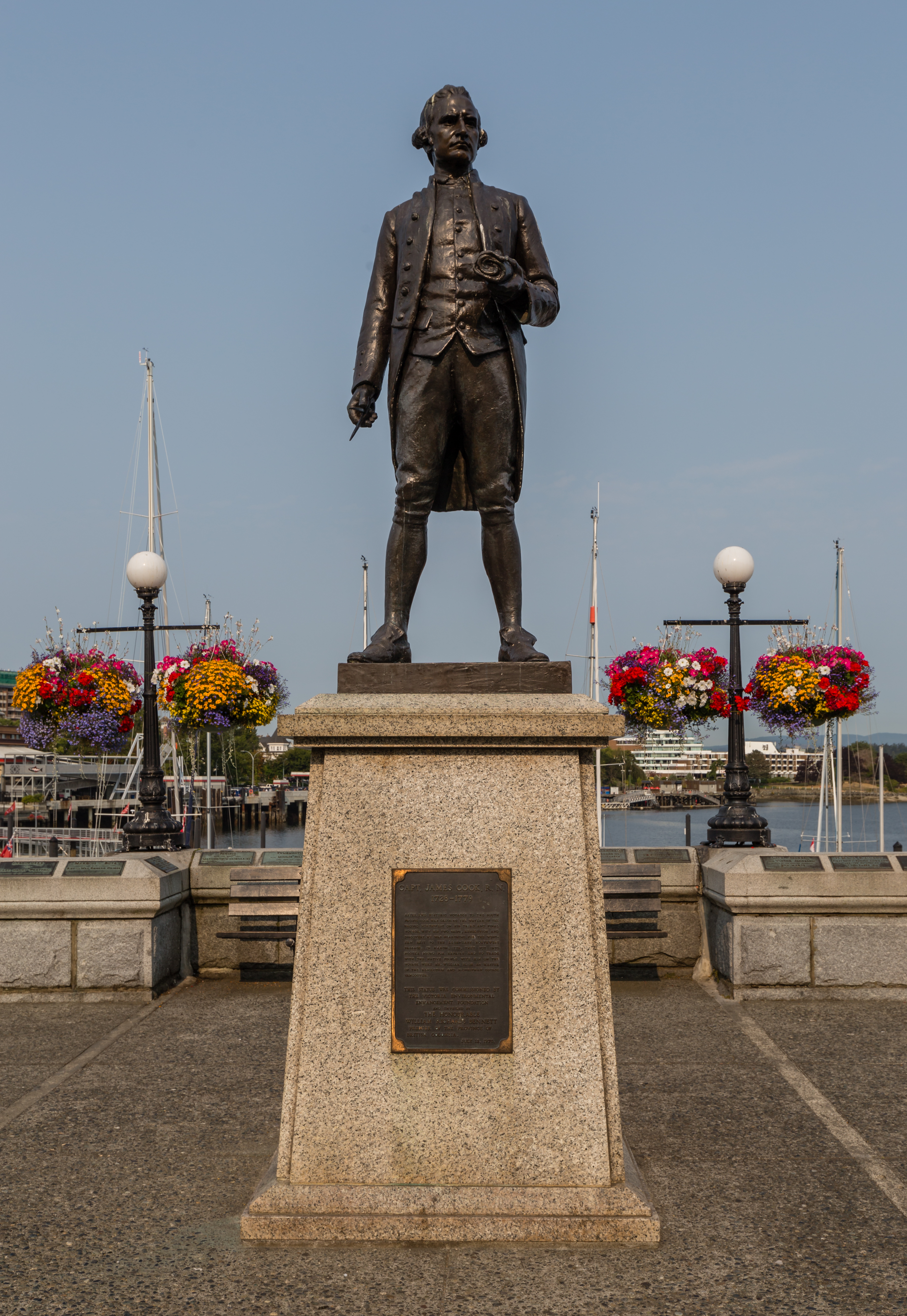
- The statue in 2018
- Artist: Derek and Patricia Freeborn, after John Tweed
- Year: 1976 (after an original of 1912)
- Medium: Fibreglass
- Location: Victoria, British Columbia, Canada; 48°25′18″N 123°22′08″W

A statue of Captain James Cook stood in Victoria, British Columbia, from 1976 until 2021, when it was toppled in a protest. It was a fibreglass copy of a bronze statue of 1912 by John Tweed in Whitby, Yorkshire, England. The Victoria Environmental Enhancement Foundation commissioned the work from Derek and Patricia Freeborn to mark the 200th anniversary of Cook's departure on his third voyage in 1776. The statue was unveiled on July 12, 1976, by William Richards Bennett, Premier of British Columbia. It stood on the Causeway, facing the Fairmont Empress hotel, with its back to the Inner Harbour.

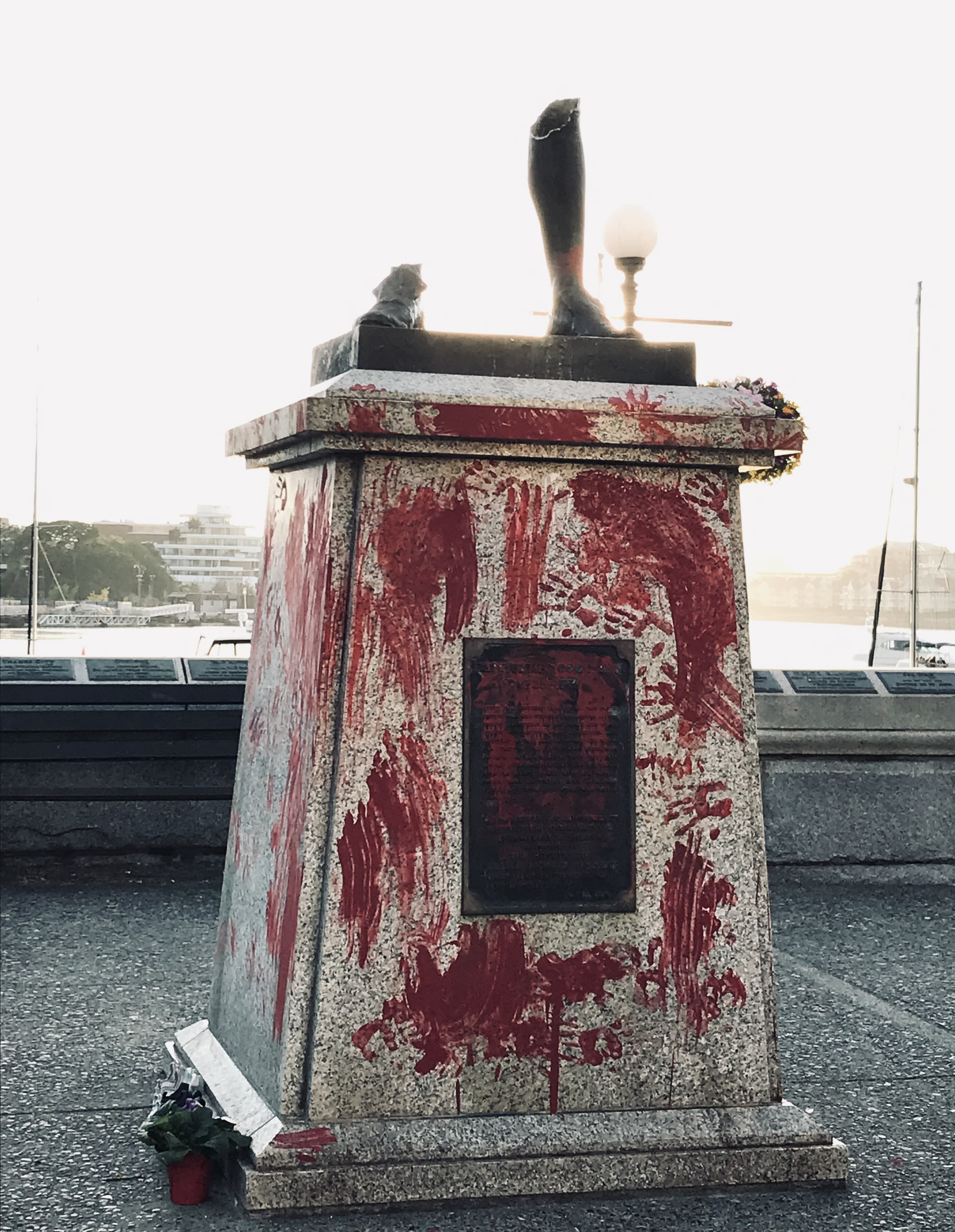
The monument destroyed and vandalised. July 6, 2021

On the night of July 1 (Canada Day), 2021, the statue was broken off and thrown into the Inner Harbour by a group of protestors; its pedestal was covered in red handprints. A makeshift statue of a red dress, commemorating missing and murdered Indigenous women, was put up in its place. The following morning a totem pole in Malahat (30km away) was set on fire, apparently in retaliation for the toppling of the statue. The statue had previously been smeared with red paint in 2020.

Following the toppling and vandalism of the statue, Ian Robertson, the CEO of the Greater Victoria Harbor Authority, announced that the statue would not return and the pedestal would be removed. Robertson stated that the statue "was significantly destroyed and beyond repair”.

== See also ==
- Monuments and memorials in Canada removed in 2020–2022
- Statue of James Cook (Anchorage, Alaska) – another replica of Tweed's statue by the Freeborns, erected the same year
- Statue of James Cook, St Kilda, a 1924 replica of Tweed's statue in Melbourne, Australia
