= Granville, British Columbia =

- Town
- Motto: None
- Location in British Columbia
- Coordinates: 49°15′N 123°6′W
- Country: Canada
- Province: British Columbia
- Settled: 1800s
- Incorporated as Vancouver: 1886
- Time zone: UTC−8 (PST)
  - Summer (DST): UTC−7 (PDT)

Granville was the name from 1870 to 1886 for what would become the townsite of Vancouver, British Columbia. The townsite included the original settlement, Gastown.

== History ==
The area was first known as Gastown, a settlement around the original makeshift tavern established by "Gassy" Jack Deighton in 1867 just west of the Hastings Mill property. In 1870 the colonial government surveyed the settlement, laid out a townsite, and renamed it "Granville" in honour of the then-British Secretary of State for the Colonies, Lord Granville. The township comprised six city blocks from Burrard Inlet south to Hastings Street, and Cambie Street east to Carrall Street. This site, with its natural harbour, was selected in 1884 as the terminus for the Canadian Pacific Railway, renamed "Vancouver", and incorporated as a city in 1886.

The name Granville survives in the city of Vancouver as Granville Street, Granville Mall, Granville Entertainment District, Granville Square, Granville Street Bridge, Granville Station of the Expo Line, Granville Island, and Vancouver Granville electoral district.

== Nearby settlements ==
- Gastown, British Columbia
- New Westminster, British Columbia
