= Great Vancouver Fire =

1886 fire that burned down most of Vancouver, British Columbia, Canada

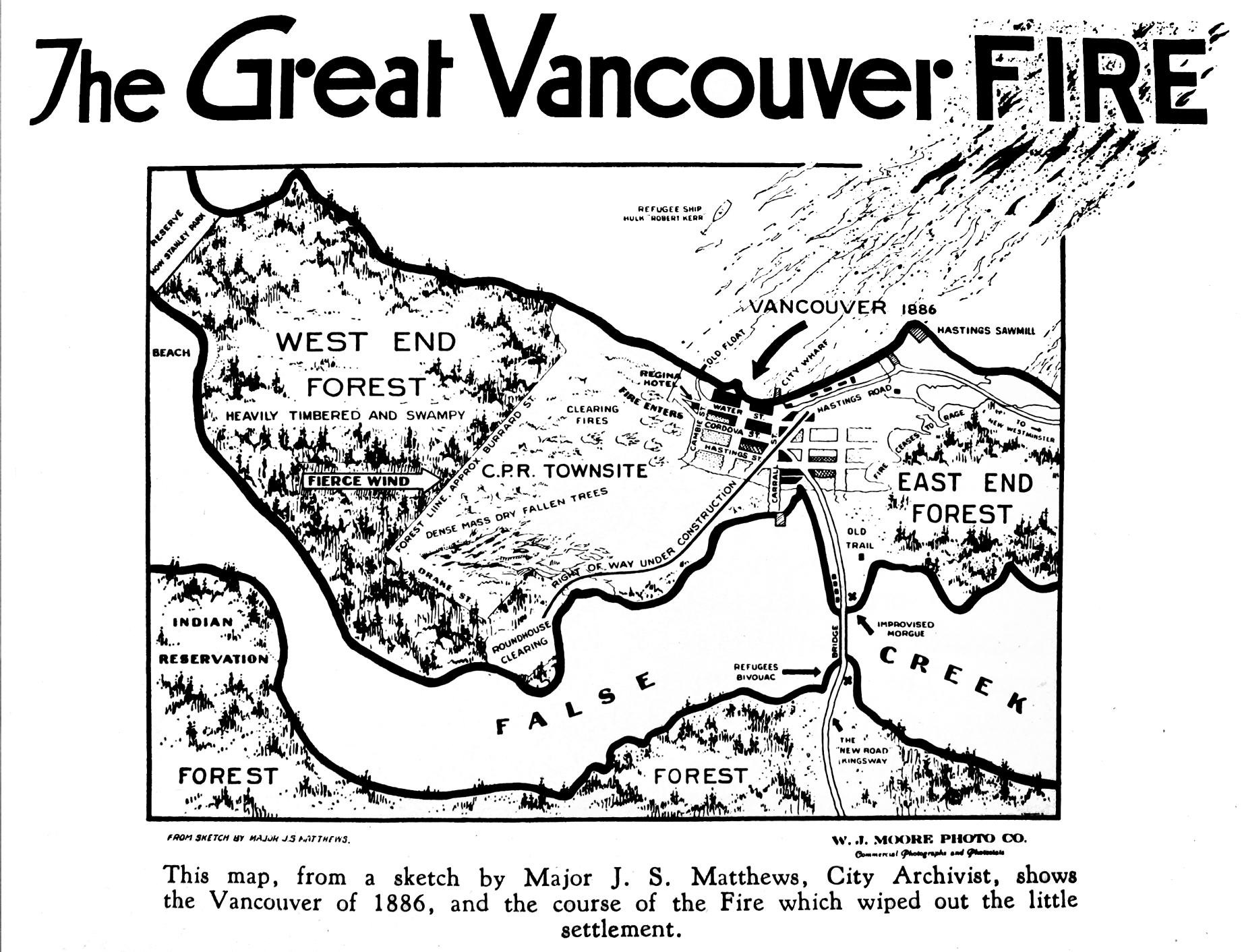
- Hand drawn map of Vancouver in 1886 showing the spread of the fire
- Date: June 13, 1886
- Location: Vancouver
- Coordinates: 49°16′59.4″N 123°06′40.6″W

Impacts
- Deaths: Exact number unknown
- Structures lost: 600–1,000

Ignition
- Cause: Out of control land-clearing fires

The Great Vancouver Fire destroyed most of the newly incorporated city of Vancouver, British Columbia, Canada, on June 13, 1886. It started as two land-clearing fires to the west of the city. The first fire was farther away from the city and was clearing land for the roundhouse of the terminus of the Canadian Pacific Railway. The second fire was clearing land to extend the city to the west. The Great Fire occurred shortly after the township of Granville had been incorporated into the City of Vancouver in April 1886.

The fires spread northeast into the city, killing at least 21 people and destroying 600 to 1,000 buildings (the exact numbers are unknown). Most residents escaped by fleeing to the Burrard Inlet shore or the False Creek shore. Following the recovery efforts, the city of Vancouver continued to grow. The city's first police force was set up, its first brick buildings were built, and its first fire engine was brought in from the nearby larger town of New Westminster.

== Early Vancouver ==
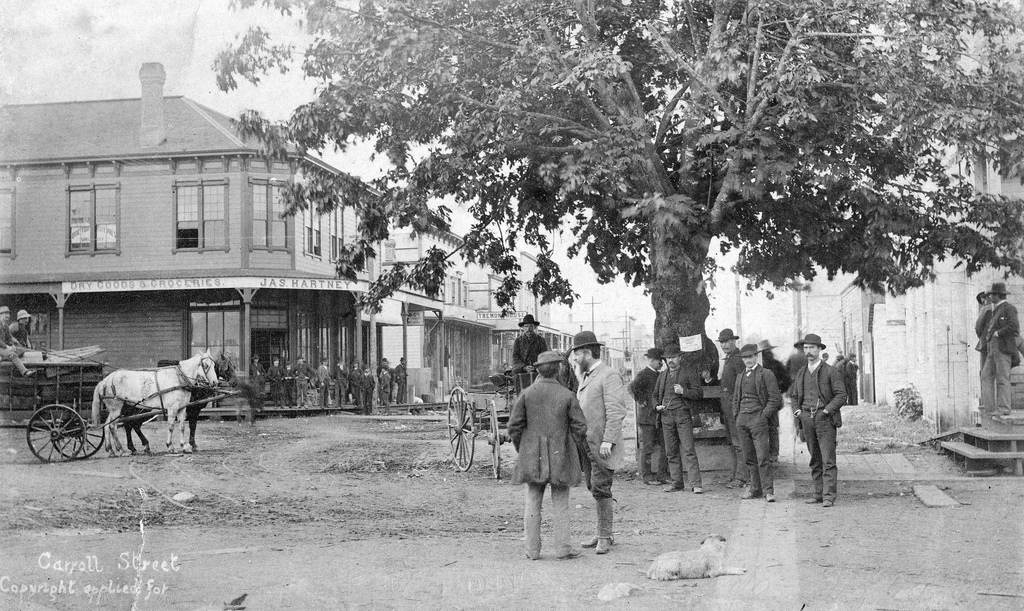
Carrall Street looking south and showing "Maple Tree" corner at Water Street, c. 1886.

European settlement in the Vancouver area began in 1862 after Captain George Henry Richard's 1859 discovery of coal in the Burrard Inlet. The settlement of Granville (later Vancouver) was formed in the mid-1860s between two Burrard Inlet sawmills. It began as shops and hotels providing service to the workers of the mills and later their families. The two sawmills were Moodyville (originally Moody's Mill), opened 1863, on the Burrard Inlet north shore and Hastings Mill (originally Stamps Mill), opened 1867, on the Inlet's south shore. The two mills were the main employers in Granville. In the early 1880s, they employed between 150 and 200 workers, not including loggers and longshoremen. The exact numbers are unknown as many of the workers were transient unmarried men, who worked at a mill for only a few weeks at a time before moving on. To reach Granville required either a nine-mile journey through dense forest from the nearby larger town of New Westminster or a thirty-mile journey via the Fraser River from Fort Langley, the capital of British Columbia at the time.

In 1885, it was announced that Granville would be the west coast terminus of the Canadian Pacific Railway. The township of Granville was incorporated as the city of Vancouver on April 6, 1886, becoming the fourth city in British Columbia. At the first city council election on May 3, 1886, Malcolm MacLean was elected the city's mayor. The inaugural meeting of the Vancouver Volunteer Hose Company No.1 was held May 28, 1886. Future Vancouver blocks and streets had been marked out to the west of the city to allow for its anticipated growth. These had been designated by the Canadian Pacific Railway land commissioner Lachlan Hamilton.

=== Demographics ===
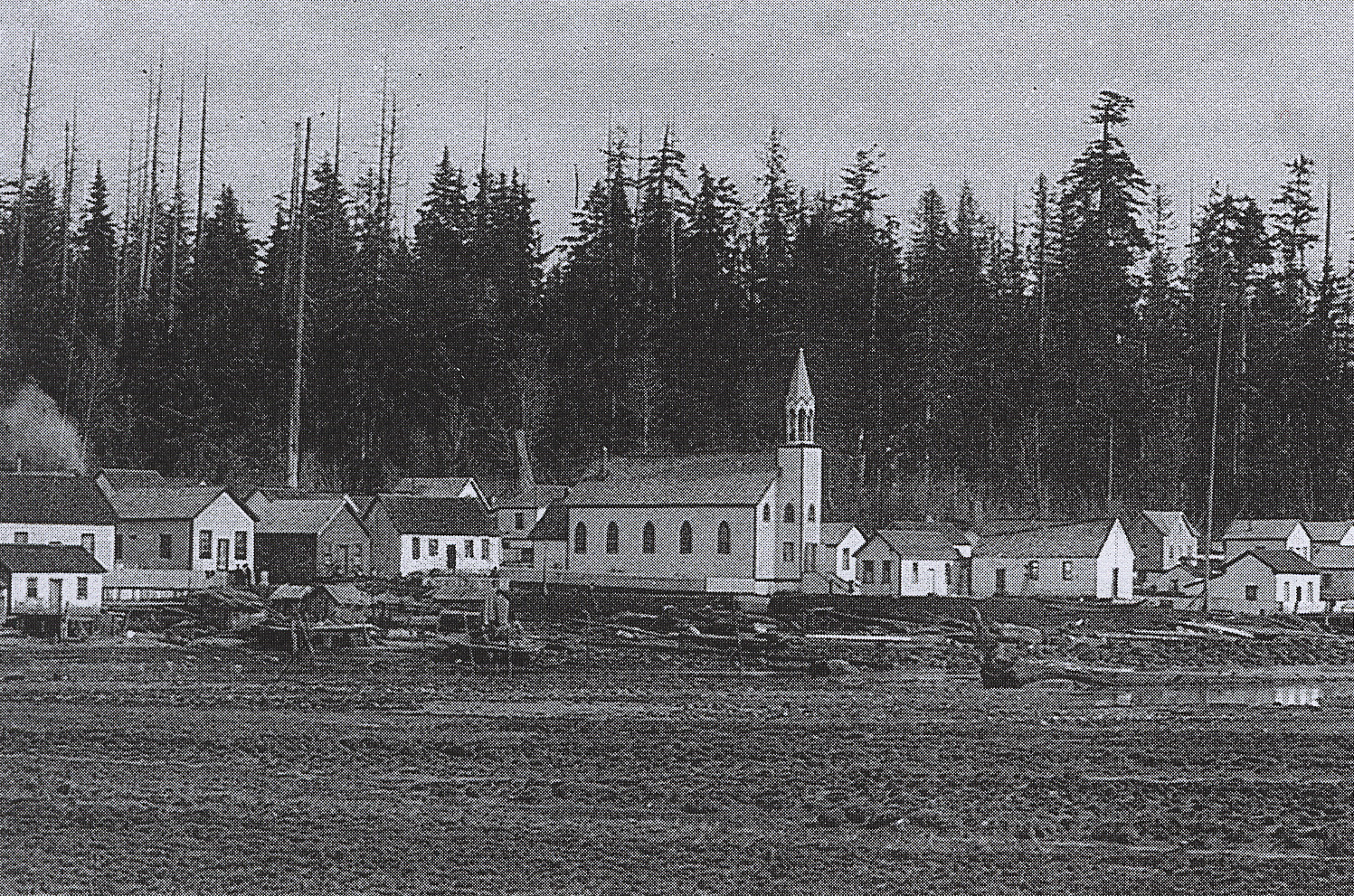
St Paul's Roman Catholic Church at the Mission Indian Reserve, later more commonly known as Eslha7an (Squamish language)

Early Vancouver attracted budding entrepreneurs who were very active in the civic politics forming the new city. The population of Granville grew substantially in the early to mid-1880s. The population and economic growth in the area in early 1886 was so significant three new newspapers were established. The mid-1880s also saw a change in the population from mostly unmarried men and some families with First Nations wives to an increasing number of families especially with European wives.

Following the British victory in the Opium Wars, British colonies such as Vancouver received an influx of Chinese migrants from the provinces surrounding Canton, the sole port for foreign trade. Most of these migrants were employed at the Hastings Mill. The Canadian Pacific Railway also brought in Chinese railway workers, employed to establish the CPR terminus.

=== First Nations people ===
The main Indigenous population in the area at the time of European settlement were the hən̓q̓əmin̓əm̓-speaking Musqueam people. When sawmilling began in 1863, the local Squamish men were hired as unskilled labour. The mission reserve near Moodyville and the Indian rancheria at Hastings Mill were the product of the mill's employment of Indigenous people. In 1881, there were at least 500 Squamish people at Burrard Inlet. The First Nations people were not given the same rights as their European contemporaries. The men were not hired for higher skilled and higher paid roles at the sawmills and women were unable to inherit property from their white partners and were often ejected from their homes after his death.

== Origin ==
Prior to the fire, Vancouver had experienced three weeks of abnormal heat for late spring. Sunday, June 13, was particularly hot with an offshore breeze from the Pacific Ocean. There was also significant forest deadfall in the area to the east of the city as well as debris from the recent clearing for the expansion of the city which provided fuel to the fire.

=== First clearing fire ===
The first clearing fire was located to the south-west of the city. The land was being cleared to create the roundhouse for the western terminus of the Canadian Pacific Railway. The dry conditions and a Pacific breeze caused the fire to grow out of workers' control throughout the morning and into the afternoon.

=== Second clearing fire ===
The second clearing fire was located at the west end of the city near the intersection of Cambie and Cordova street. The fire was being used to clear land for the expansion of the city. It grew out of control in the early afternoon.

== Spread ==
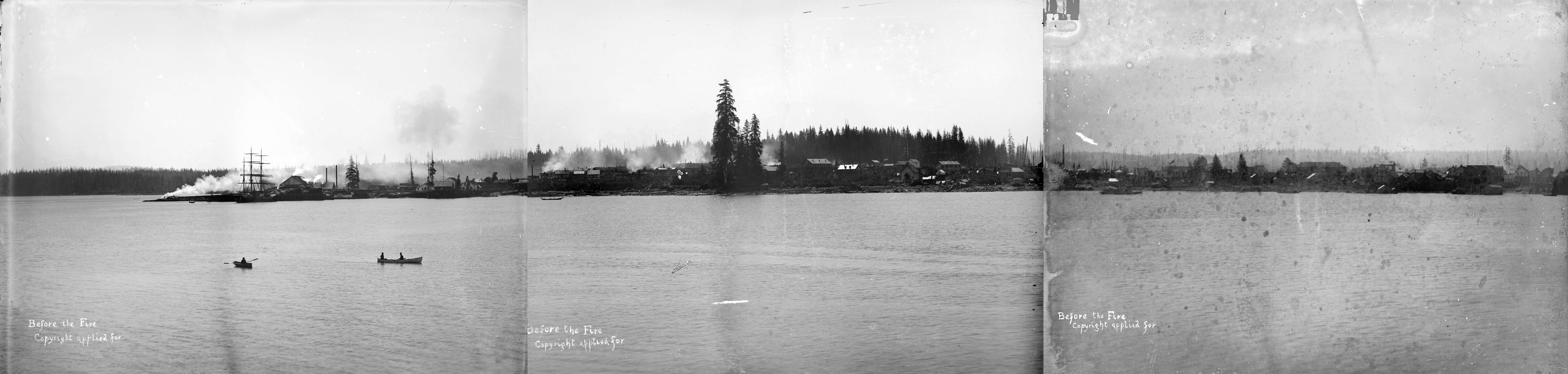
Panorama of Vancouver with clearing fire c. 1886

The men working on the clearing fires and volunteers from the town attempted to put out both fires with buckets, wet blankets and shovels. For the first clearing fire, the water came from False Creek, whilst the second fire used the hand-pump well at the newly constructed nearby Regina Hotel. The men attempted to bring both fires under control into the afternoon, however, the breeze turned to a gale and the men at the first fire were forced to give up their efforts and flee to the False Creek shore. At the second fire, an attempt to create a fire break with pickaxes was unsuccessful. The second fire was abandoned when the two fire fronts joined.

The smoke from the fire filled the sky over the town. The men fleeing warned the people in the town of the incoming fire. Most residents hurriedly packed up their belongings and their stores and headed to the Burrard Inlet shore. However, despite warnings from other residents and the growing smoke, a number of residents did not believe the fire was dangerous. Some residents waited until the last minute to flee whilst others headed to the hotels to drink the unguarded liquor. The Squamish people from the south shore village Snauq, paddled across in canoes to view the fire.

At the Burrard Inlet shore, some residents were able to flee out into the inlet on floats and vessels. At least two hundred people found refuge on the Robert Kerr, "the ship that saved Vancouver", a 58-metre (190 ft) wooden ship at anchor close to the Burrard Inlet shore at the time. The local Squamish Nation provided help to the survivors who were floundering in the water. They paddled over and canoed people to safety. The men of the Vancouver Volunteer Hose Company No.1 went to Scoullar's General Store to remove a supply of explosives, which were taken to the Hastings Mill at the opposite end of town. The city clerk Thomas McGuian saved the city records detailing the city's short history by entrusting them to a stranger.

== After the fire ==
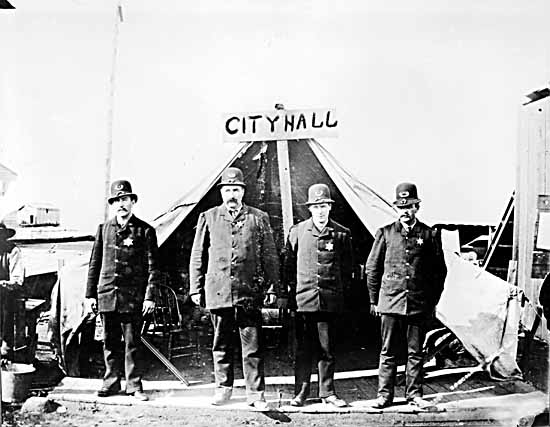
Vancouver Police Department 1886

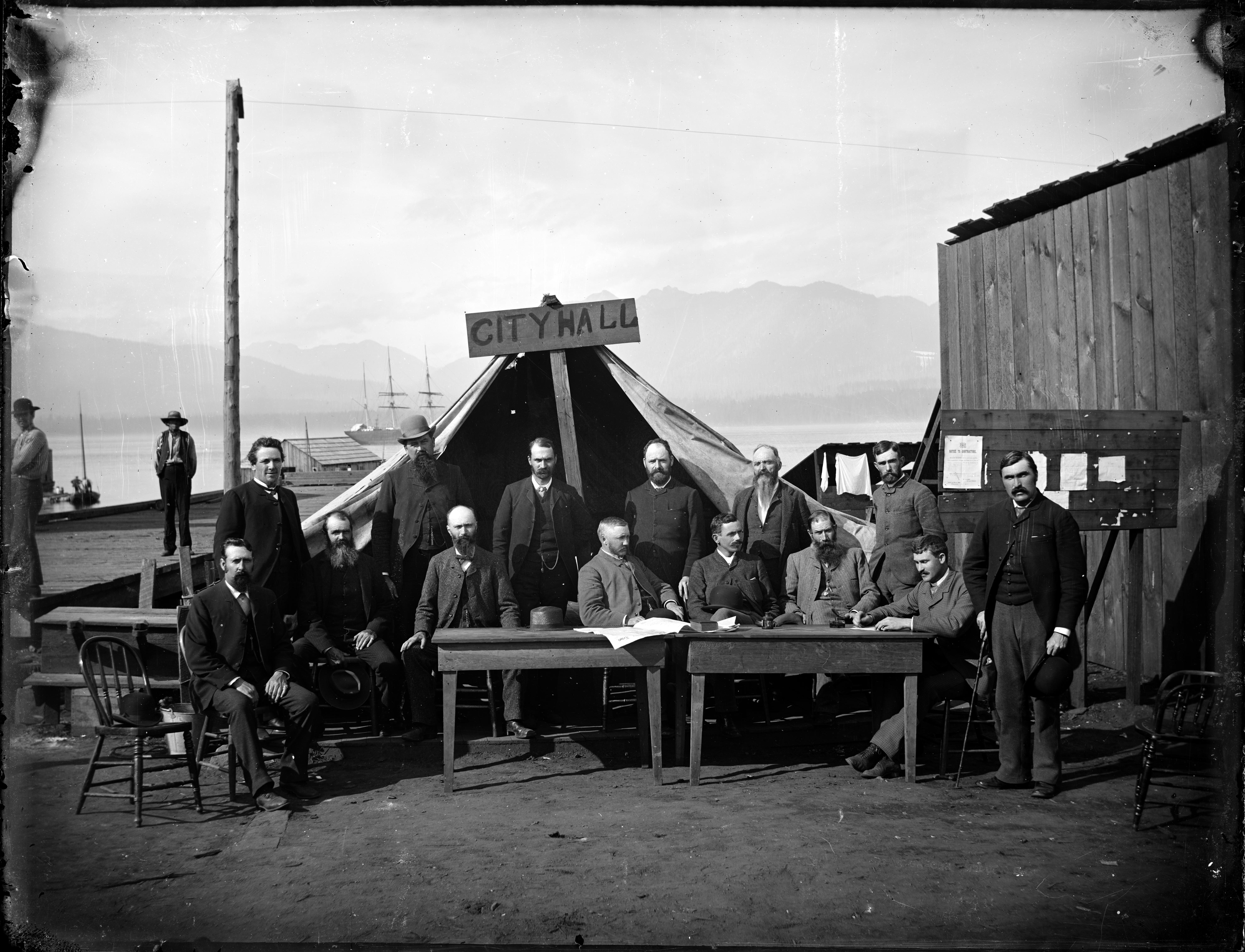
First Vancouver City Council meeting after the fire c. 1886

After the fire passed, the newly elected Mayor of Vancouver, Malcolm MacLean, sent telegrams to the Canadian Prime Minister and the Mayor of Toronto. The telegram to the Prime Minister Sir John A. Macdonald read: "Our city is ashes three thousand people homeless can you send us any government aid?" The telegrams were sent via horse to the nearby town of New Westminster. Shortly after, word arrived that relief supplies from New Westminster were being sent in wagons. At this time most Vancouver residents had gathered at Hastings Mill or False Creek. Mayor MacLean instructed the survivors to gather at Westminster Bridge to await the relief supplies. An impromptu bivouac was set up with tents and lean-tos made with large branches. At around midnight, supplies arrived from New Westminster and Port Moody (an eastern township on the Burrard Inlet).

=== Damage ===
Between 600 and 1,000 buildings were destroyed by the fire, with few surviving the blaze. The Regina Hotel at the north of the city survived, as did the Bridge Hotel at the south-east. A side building of the Bridge Hotel was used as a makeshift morgue. According to Alderman Gallagher, a Vancouver businessman, who witnessed the fire and the aftermath, there were 21 bodies (or parts thereof) found immediately after the fire, while others were discovered during the cleanup and rebuilding. The exact number of dead is unknown, mostly because Vancouver's population at this time was constantly changing due to its rapid expansion as well as the transient nature of many of the mill workers.

=== Newspaper reports ===
The Quebec Daily Telegraph reported the fire June 15, 1886. It reported five people dead, 1,000 homeless and a total loss of an estimated one million dollars. The Day in New London, Connecticut, reported the fire June 15, 1886, with 50 people dead, 1,000 homeless and a total loss of one million dollars. The Manistee Weekly Times in the June 15, 1886, edition outlined the events of the fire and attributed the blaze to the Canadian Pacific Railway. It also reported that “liberal and prompt” aid was expected from Canadian Pacific. The fire was reported in the June 16, 1886, edition of the Toronto World. It reported 12 lives had been lost, outlined the events of the fire and included a response from the Toronto mayor promising immediate aid. The Montreal Gazette reported June 18, 1938, that a George H. Keefer of Cobble Hill, British Columbia, claimed he was responsible for setting the Great Vancouver Fire. This claim is not verified by any other sources.

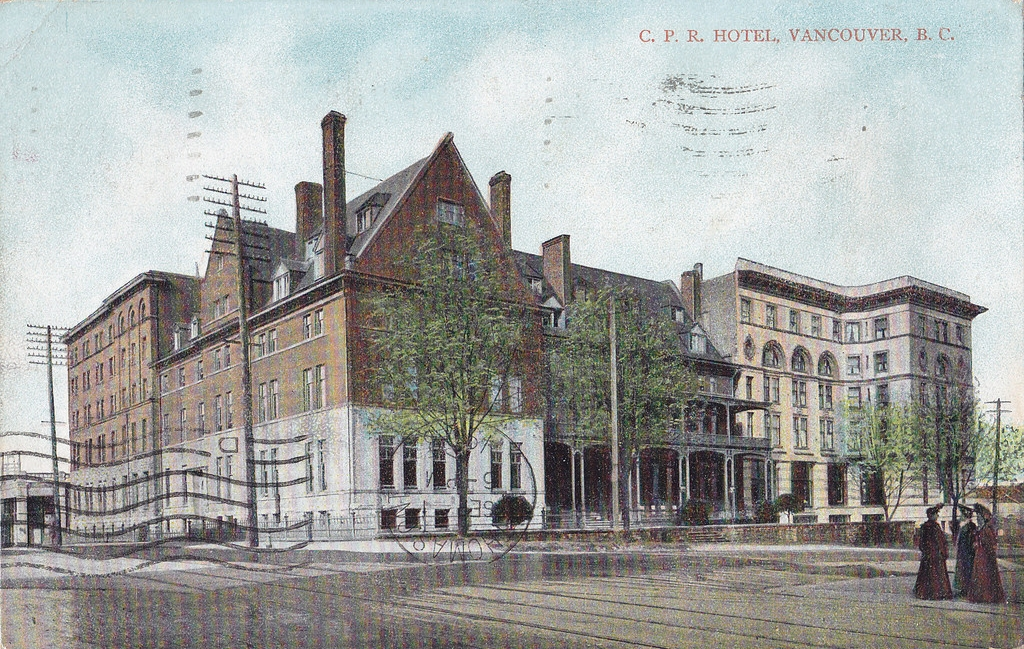
Postcard of CPR Hotel Vancouver, c.1908. The front left portion of the building was built following the fire.

=== Rebuilding ===
The day after the fire, the manager of the Hastings Mill, Richard Alexander, announced free lumber for anyone rebuilding their homes and businesses after the fire. Impromptu emergency shelters were set up in the few surviving structures. Several blocks of ice found beneath the wreckage of the Deighton House ice shed provided drinking water to residents. The city council set up a temporary tent city hall. A few months later, one of the first brick buildings in Vancouver became the city hall building. The day after the fire, to address looting, Mayor MacLean appointed three special constables, Jackson Abray, V.W. Haywood, and John McLaren, to join constable John Stewart as the first Vancouver police force. The police force operated out of the city hall tent whilst Vancouver was rebuilt.

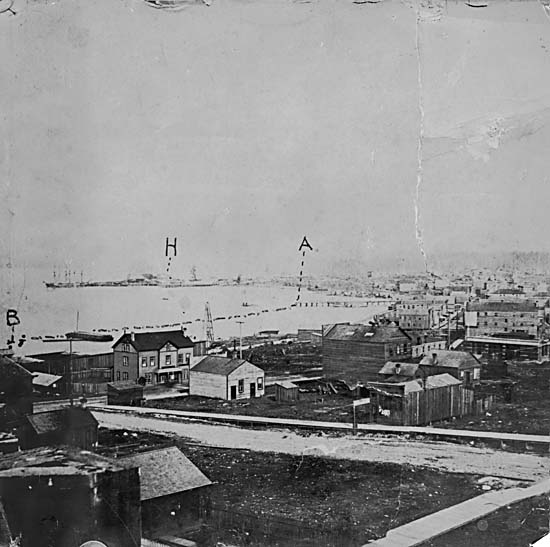
City Wharf at Cordova and Hastings Streets c. late 1886

In the days that followed, the residents of Vancouver set up white canvas tents and small huts and searched the wreckages of their homes and businesses looking for any surviving objects. The CPR Hotel was the first building to be completely rebuilt. Within two weeks, Cordova St from Carrall to Abbott streets was filled with businesses reopening in basic structures. The City Council organised the main streets to be planked. Within six months, 500 buildings had been rebuilt with many of the new buildings being made from brick.

=== Population growth ===
After the fire, the City Council focused on urban development to promote the growth of the city. The Canadian Pacific Railway played an important role in the growth of Vancouver. It brought demographic and economic growth and was the largest property owner. In the years following the fire, the population of Vancouver continued to grow, expanding from several hundred people, to 2,000 people within a year and 13,000 people within six years.

== See also ==
- List of fires in Canada
- List of disasters in Canada
