= Statue of John A. Macdonald (Halterman) =

Statue in Charlottetown, Prince Edward Island

- Year: 2021
- Medium: Bronze sculpture
- Subject: John A. Macdonald
- Location: Charlottetown, Prince Edward Island, Canada; 46.233783°N 63.126986°W

A statue of John A. Macdonald by Mike Halterman was installed near the gateway of Victoria Row in Charlottetown, Prince Edward Island, until 2021. It was removed as a result of public outcry against Macdonald's involvement with the Indian residential school system.
