= Statue of John A. Macdonald (Wade) =

Statue in Kingston, Ontario, Canada

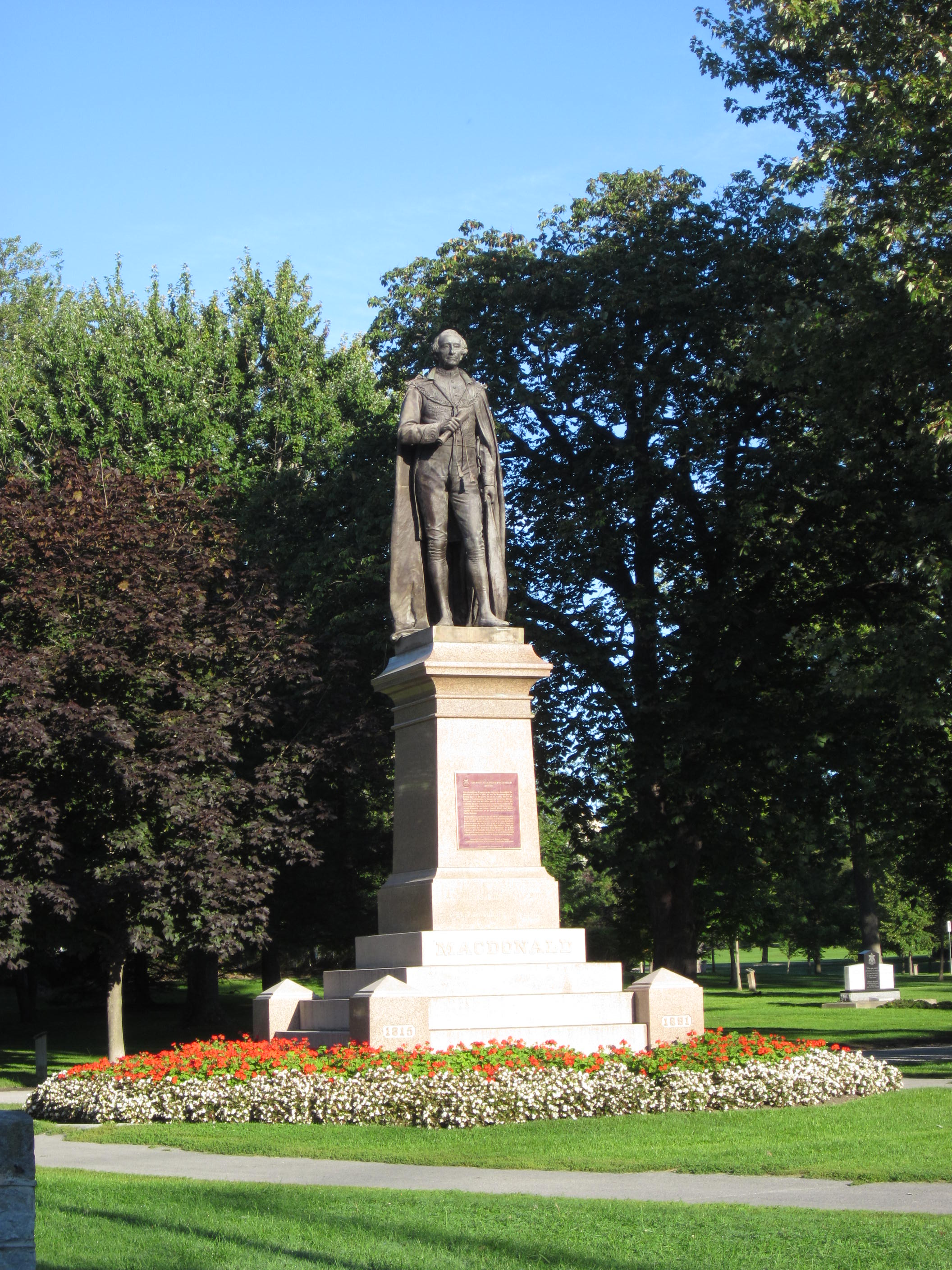
- The statue in 2011
- Artist: George Edward Wade
- Subject: John A. Macdonald
- Location: Kingston, Ontario, Canada

A statue of John A. Macdonald by George Edward Wade was installed in Kingston, Ontario, until 2021.

== Relocation ==
In 2021 the statue was removed from its original spot at City Park with plans to move it to Cataraqui Cemetery, where Macdonald is buried. In August 2022, the cemetery board voted not to erect the statue. As of August 2023, there were still no plans for the statue.
