= Statue of James Cook, St Kilda =

Statue in Melbourne, Victoria, Australia

Coordinates: 37°51′50″S 144°58′18″E

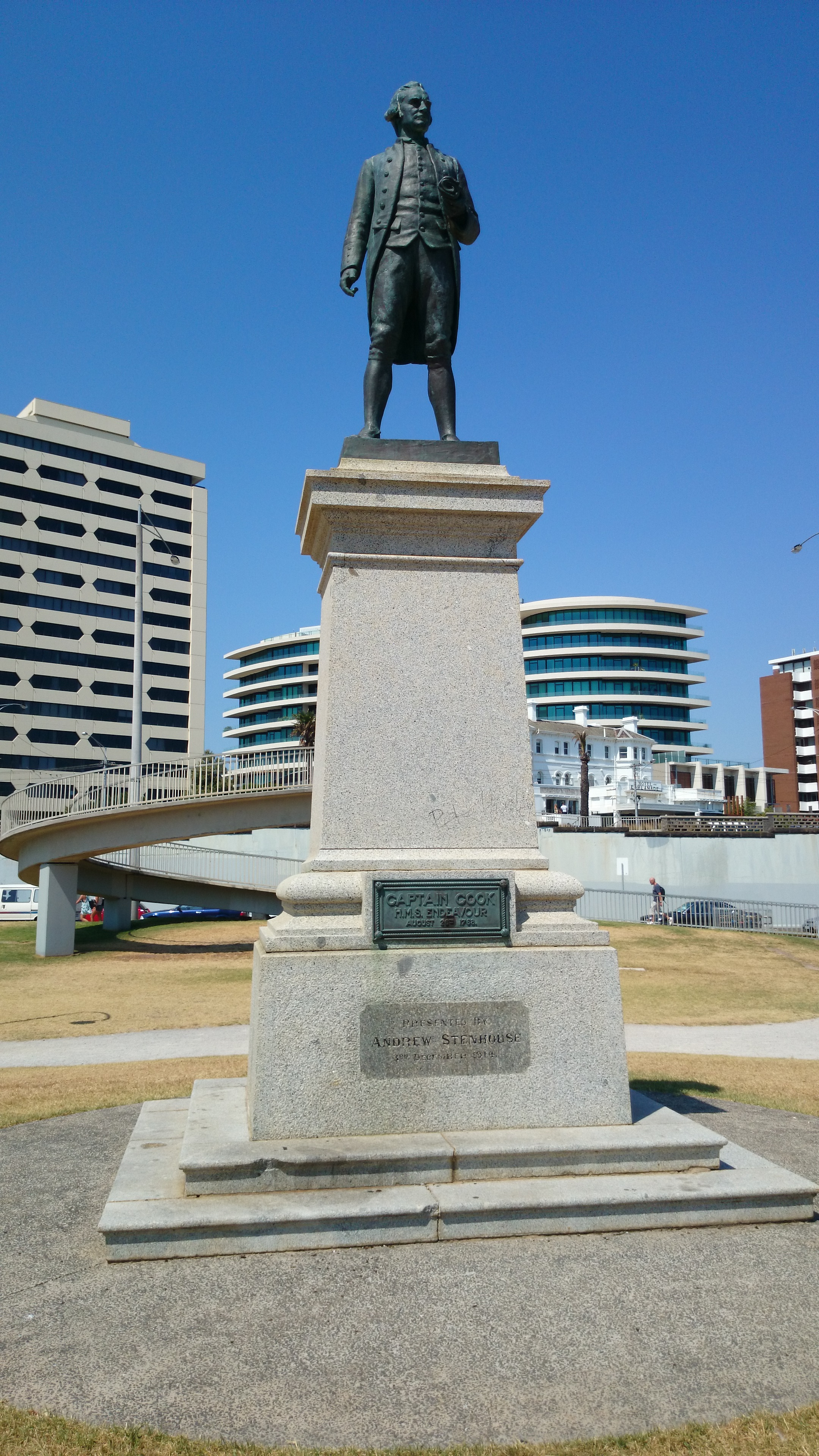
The statue in 2014.

The statue of British explorer James Cook was erected in 1914, and is located near the base of St Kilda Pier in the Catani Gardens, St Kilda, a suburb of Melbourne, in Victoria, Australia.

== History ==
From 1906 the St Kilda foreshore was gradually landscaped and beautified with lawns, trees, shrubberies and facilities, to a design generally credited to government engineer and local resident Carlo Cartani.

Businessman Andrew Stenhouse, who lived in the large house at 362 Beaconsfield Parade facing the gardens, donated funds to the St Kilda City Council for a statue of Captain Cook. The monument commemorates Cook's voyage, begun in 1768, which was the first time Europeans arrived at the east coast of Australia. A life sized bronze on a tall plinth had been erected in 1912 on the West Cliff of Whitby, North Yorkshire, the English town where Cook started his maritime career. That statue was sculpted by John Tweed, and at least three copies were made, the other two going to New Zealand and British Columbia. The St Kilda statue was unveiled on 7 December 1914. The rear of the plinth lists the crew of that voyage. It was originally located in the main Catani Gardens, and moved to the current location some time later.

The statue is listed on the National Trust Database of Victoria. The entry on the database of the describes the monument as "a good example of early twentieth century British Edwardian academic memorial sculpture" although less important than the equestrian statue of Edward VII by Edgar Bertram Mackennal at Queen Victoria Gardens.

Since 2018, the statue has been physically targeted on dates near Australia Day in late January. In 2018, the statue was graffitied with the words "no pride". An Aboriginal Australian flag was placed next to the statue. In 2022, the statue was covered with red paint.

== 2024 vandalism ==
On the 24 January 2024, on the eve of Australia Day, the statue was cut down at its ankles from its plinth in an act of vandalism. The words "The colony will fall" were written on the plinth of the statue. The statue of Queen Victoria in Queen Victoria Gardens was also covered with red paint. The Premier of Victoria, Jacinta Allan said that there was "no place in our community" for the vandalism of both monuments. The mayor of Port Phillip, Heather Cunsolo, said that she could not condone "the vandalism of a public asset where costs will be ultimately borne by ratepayers" but did understand the "diverse views surrounding Australia Day". Following a 'fiery debate', Council voted to repair and reinstate the statue.
