= Hastings Mill =

Sawmill in Vancouver, Canada

Coordinates: 49.286°N 123.095°W

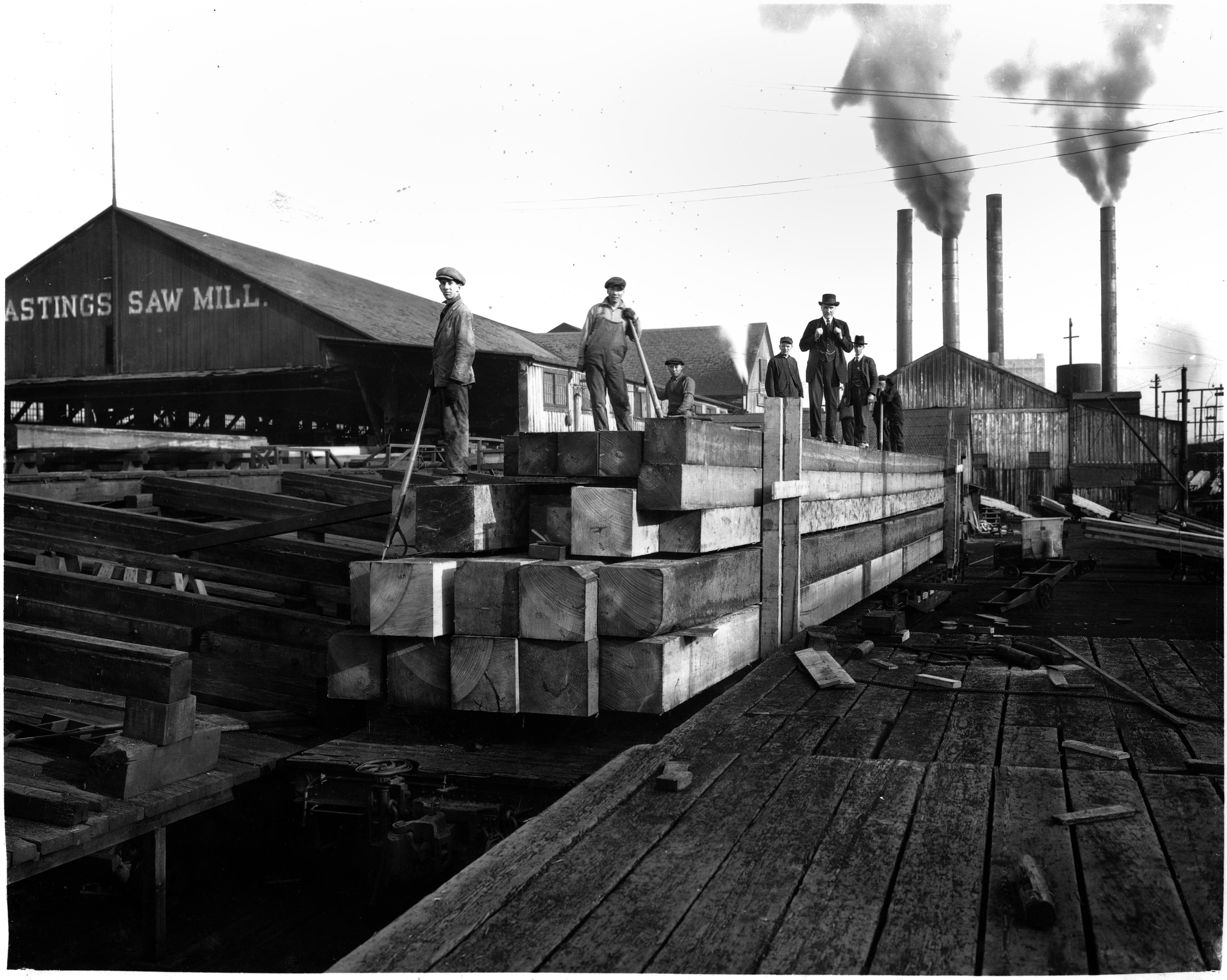
Timber being loaded onto flat cars at Hastings Mill, 1925.

Hastings Mill was a sawmill on the south shore of Burrard Inlet and was the first commercial operation around which the settlement that would become Vancouver developed in British Columbia, Canada. Founded in 1865 by Edward Stamp, the sawmill operated until its closure in 1928.

The store building of Hastings Mills was moved to Alma Street in 1930, situated within present day Hastings Mill Park. The store building was opened as the Old Hastings Mill Store Museum in 1932, and houses exhibits that showcase artifacts and items of significance to Vancouver's history.

== History ==
In 1867, Captain Edward Stamp began producing lumber in Stamp's Mill at the foot of what is now Dunlevy Avenue after a planned site at Brockton Point proved unsuitable due to difficult currents and a shoal. Stamp's efforts in developing the mill are summarized by Robert Macdonald in Making Vancouver: Class, Status and Social Boundaries, 1863-1913:

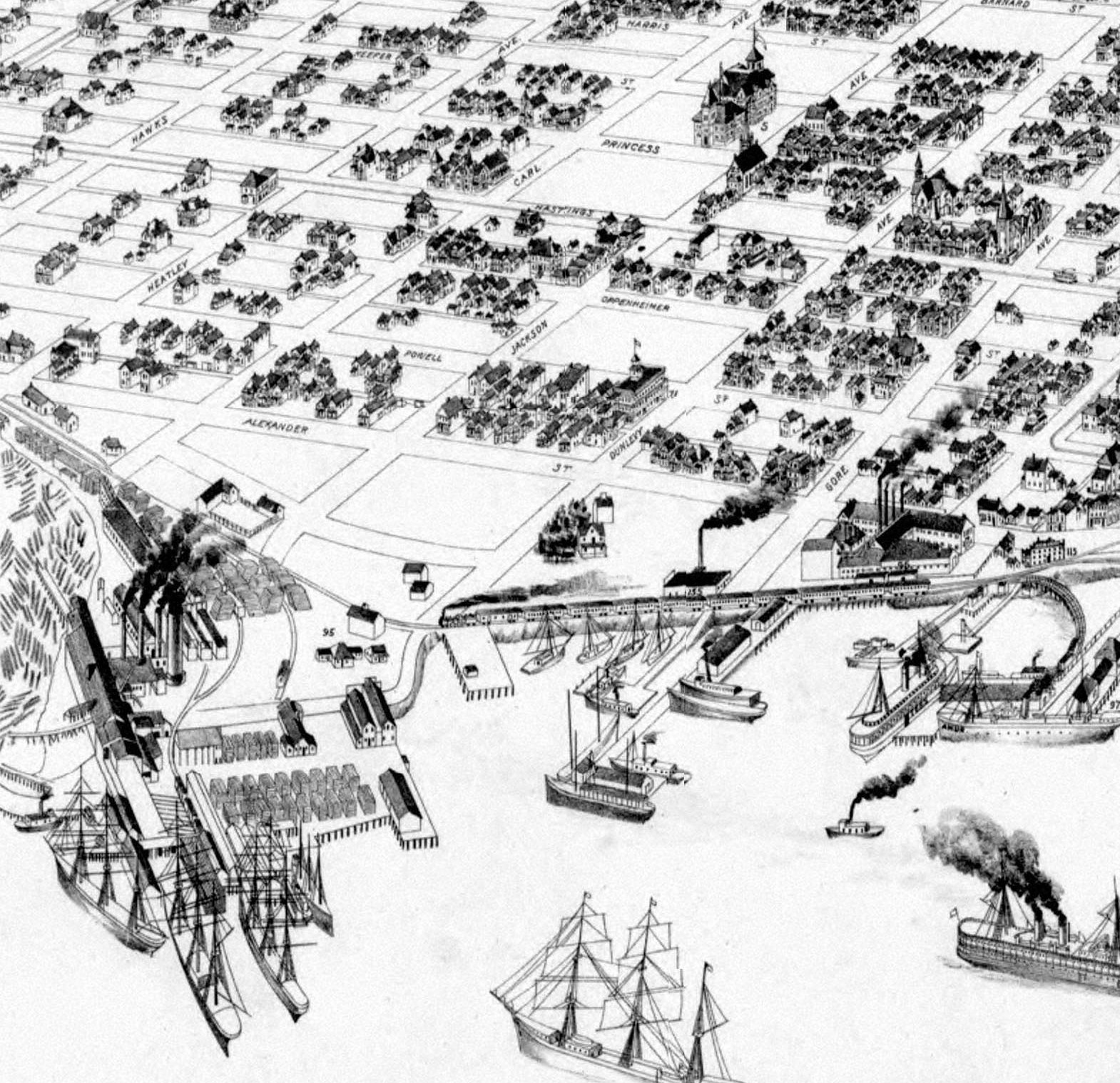
Panorama of Vancouver in 1898 with Hastings Mill at the shoreline

In 1865 he formed a company in England, backed by capital of $100,000, to produce lumber in British Columbia. Stamp also secured from the colonial government of British Columbia the right to purchase or lease 16,000 acres (65 km^{2}) of timber on the lower coast, and selected a mill site on a point of land along Burrard Inlet's south shore. Delayed by the failure of crucial machinery parts to arrive from England, Stamp did not begin cutting lumber for export until June 1867. After managing the firm for less than two years he retired, and shortly thereafter his company went into liquidation in England. The mill closed for a period in 1870 but opened again in August after being purchased by Dickson, DeWolf and Company of San Francisco. Known at first as Stamp's Mill, it now became the Hastings Sawmill Company, or Hastings Mill.

The early settlement was in effect a company town. People shopped at the Hastings Mill Store and sent their children to the Hastings Mill School, which included students from Moodyville on the opposite side of the inlet. This would change after the Canadian Pacific Railway chose Vancouver as the terminus for the transcontinental railway. Nevertheless, the lumber industry remained the backbone of the new settlement's economy, and Hastings Mill was "the nucleus around which the city of Vancouver grew up in the 1880s" and remained important to the local economy until it closed in 1928.

== Museum ==
The sawmill's store building was re-purposed into a museum in 1932.

After Hastings Mill closed, the building that housed the Hastings Mill store was transported by barge to the foot of Alma Street by the Native Daughters of British Columbia in 1930. The building was officially reopened in 1931, and was dedicated as the Museum of B.C. Historical Relics in Memory of the Pioneers, or the Old Hastings Mill Store Museum in 1932. Still operated by the Native Daughters of British Columbia, a service organization dedicated to collecting and preserving the early settlement history of British Columbia, the museum houses artifacts and curiosities from Vancouver's past, and First Nations art.

Built in 1865, the museum building is the oldest building in Vancouver. The building was one of the only structures to survive the Great Vancouver Fire in 1886, and was used as a hospital and morgue for the fire's victims.

== See also ==
- John Hendry (industrialist)
- List of heritage buildings in Vancouver
- List of museums in British Columbia
