= Brian Hill =

Brian Hill may refer to:

== Arts and entertainment ==
- Brian Hill (fl. 2001–06), American drummer in the bands the Plot to Blow Up the Eiffel Tower and the Soft Pack
- Brian Hill (director) (fl. 2002–05), British film and television director
- Brian Hill (fl. 2004–09), American bass player for the Postmarks
- Brian Hill (chef) (fl. 2006–10), American contestant on the reality television program Top Chef
- Brian Hill (author) (fl. 2006 and after), Canadian actor, director and writer

== Politics and law ==
- Brian Hill (diplomat) (1919–1998), Australian ambassador
- Brian Hill (Ohio politician) (fl. 2011 and after), American state legislator in the Ohio House of Representatives
- Brian Hill (Oklahoma politician), American politician, member of the Oklahoma House of Representatives

== Sports ==
=== Association football (soccer) ===
- Brian Hill (footballer, born 1937) (1937–1968), English footballer (Sheffield Wednesday)
- Brian Hill (footballer, born 1941) (1941–2016), English footballer (Coventry City)
- Brian Hill (footballer, born 1942) (born 1942), English footballer (Grimsby Town)
- Brian Hill (referee) (born 1947), English football referee

=== Other sports ===
- Brian Hill (basketball) (born 1947), American basketball coach
- Brian Hill (ice hockey) (born 1957), Canadian ice hockey player
- Brian Hill (swimmer) (born 1982), Canadian Paralympic swimmer
- Brian Hill (American football) (born 1995), American football running back

== Others ==
- Brian Hill (businessman), Canadian businessman who is best known as the founder and former CEO of the Canadian women's clothing retailer Aritzia.
- Brian W. Hill (1932–2023), British historian

== See also ==
- Brian Hills (born 1959), Canadian ice hockey coach and former player
- Brian Andrew Hills (1934–2006), Welsh physiologist
- Bryan Hill (disambiguation)
- Hill (surname)
