= Bryan Hill =

Bryan Hill may refer to:

- Bryan Hill School, St. Louis
- Bryan Hill (soccer) (active 2009), American soccer player, see 2009 PDL season
- Bryan Edward Hill (born 1977), writer

== See also ==
- Brian Hill (disambiguation)
- Hill (surname)
