= Brian Hill (businessman) =

Canadian entrepreneur

Brian Hill is a Canadian businessman and philanthropist, the founder and the former executive chair of Vancouver-based clothing company Aritzia. After the opening of its first location in 1984, the company grew steadily in its forty years of operation, servicing a demographic of young Canadian women and employing more than 2,300 people. Aritzia sets itself part by designing and producing its many in-house brands.

== Early life and education ==
Brian Hill was raised in Vancouver, British Columbia, Canada. Jim Hill, his father, is the founder of Hills of Kerrisdale, a Canadian luxury retailer. His youth has been described as "sorting hangers, washing windows and absorbing his dad’s business tutelage", and he is said to have "had a clear grasp of... retail" by the time he left for university. (In his youth, in addition to his father's mentorship, he worked under his uncle, Forbes Hill.)

Brian Hill attended Queen's University in commerce, a program from which he had to transfer after posting failing grades—but was "[s]aved by a strong performance in economics", and Hill graduated in that program instead. Upon graduation, Hill moved back to Vancouver.

== Business career ==
=== Aritzia ===
After return to Vancouver, Hill opened the first of his family's Aritzia stores in 1984, at Oakridge Centre—a shopping mall on the west side of that city—an initiative with his brother Ross. (Brian Hill was 23 years of age at the time.)

Hill claimed that he saw a niche gap in the clothing market, which he intended to fill with high quality clothing with affordable price points lying somewhere between luxury clothing retailers geared towards adolescent Canadian females and young middle-class Canadian women, and the trendy retailers for young Canadian girls. As described by Susan Hollis of BD Business in her feature on Hill in October 2008, on Hill's being recognised as that publication's 2008 Entrepreneur of the Year, he

[c]apitaliz[ed] on the lacklustre fashion retail landscape of the times... [and] began targeting the emerging teen and young adult market—an affluent demographic that had little on which to spend its disposable income. Unable to source cutting-edge designs from other manufacturers, Hill looked inward for inspiration and established a number of in-house clothing lines to provide trend-setting fashions for his customers.

Aritizia's six private, in-house brands and their two brands of accessories—as of this date, respectively, Wilfred, TNA, Talula, Sunday Best, Community, and Babaton, and the accessory lines, SIXELEVEN and Auxiliary—are responsible for generating 80 percent of the company's sales.

Near the end of the 1990s, Aritzia expanded nationally across Canada, and then in 2005, it made forays into the United States. Current American cities with Aritzia boutiques include Seattle, San Francisco, Los Angeles, Chicago, Boston and New York City. Aritzia has continuously expanded to 105 locations across North America after being in business for four decades.

As of April 2021, based on Aritzia's corporate filings, Hill has earned a yearly salary of $1 since Aritzia went public in 2016.

== Wealth and philanthropy ==
As of December 2024, Forbes reported that Brian Hill was a billionaire.

Under Brian Hill's leadership, Aritzia has been a sponsor and advocate of the foundation, Cause We Care, which provides support to Vancouver-area single mothers struggling to provide for their children, an organisation founded in 2007 by his wife, Andrea Thomas Hill (she, a June 2025 recipient of Canada's King Charles III Coronation Medal).

As of this date, Hill and his wife also supported the BC Children's Hospital Foundation, and the Vancouver Art Gallery.

== Personal life ==
Hill met his wife, Andrea Thomas Hill, at the end of 1990s, and they married and started a family together.
