= Reigning Champ =

Canadian streetwear and athleisure brand

- Industry: Fashion
- Founded: 2007
- Founder: Craig Atkinson
- Headquarters: Vancouver, British Columbia, Canada
- Number of locations: 4 (2026)
- Area served: North America
- Products: Clothing
- Parent: CYC Design Corporation
- Website: reigningchamp.com

Reigning Champ is a Canadian streetwear and athleisure brand based in Vancouver and founded in 2007 by Craig Atkinson, who also founded wings+horns.

The brand focuses on caps, t-shirts, hoodies, sweatpants, shorts, and tank tops in cotton, heavyweight fleece, and Merino wool. Reigning Champ is sold at 130 retailers worldwide.

In 2021 Reigning Champ was acquired by Canadian apparel retailer Aritzia at a valuation of $63 million.

== Collaborations ==
Reigning Champ worked with Adidas on designs for shoes, shorts, track pants, sweatpants, knit bomber jackets, and hoodies.

Reigning Champ has collaborated with Everest, Asics Tiger, Major League Soccer, National Basketball Association, and Converse.

== See also ==
- A Bathing Ape
- Billionaire Boys Club
- Virgil Abloh
- OVO
- Chrome Hearts
- Highsnobiety
- Visvim
