= Oakridge Park =

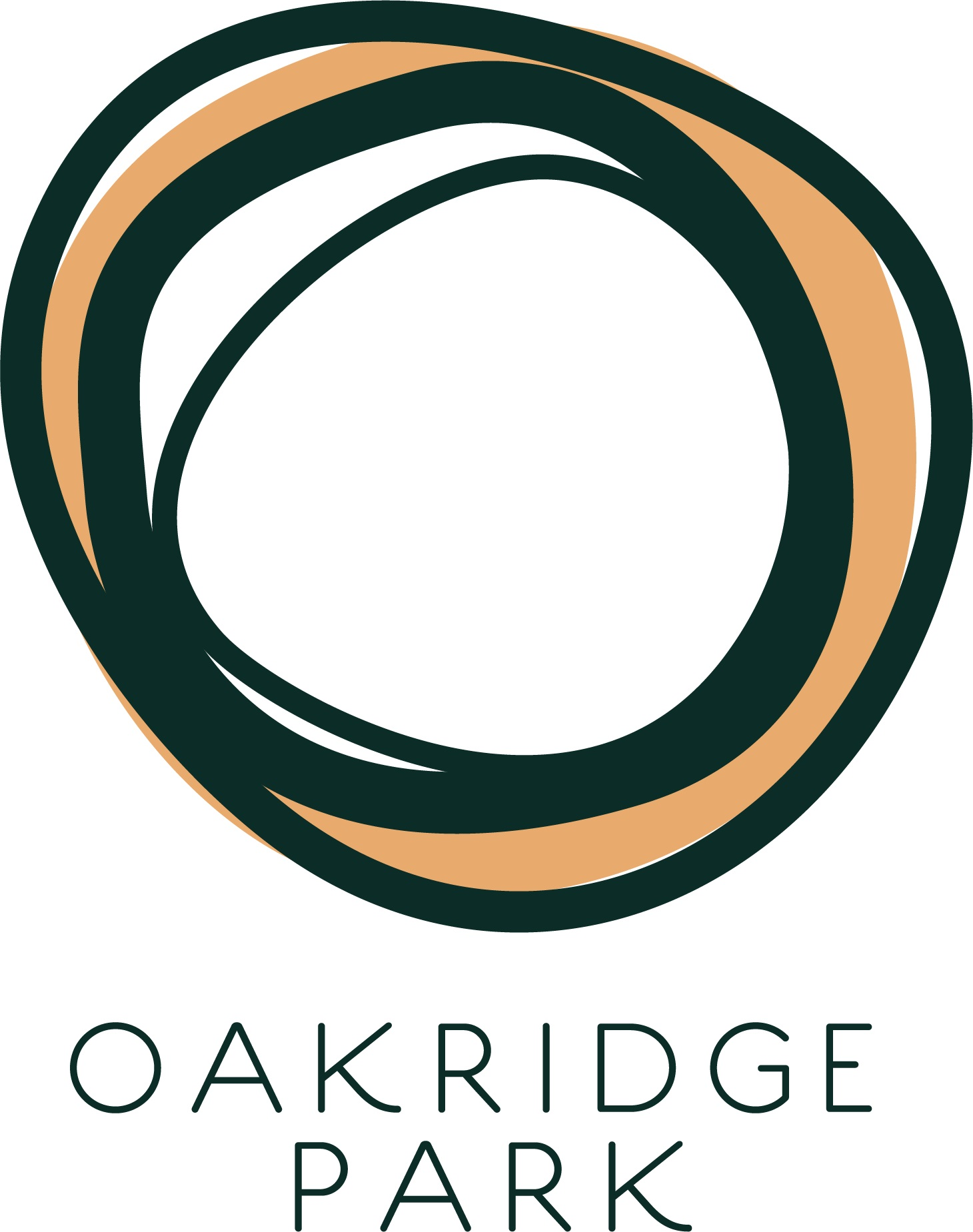

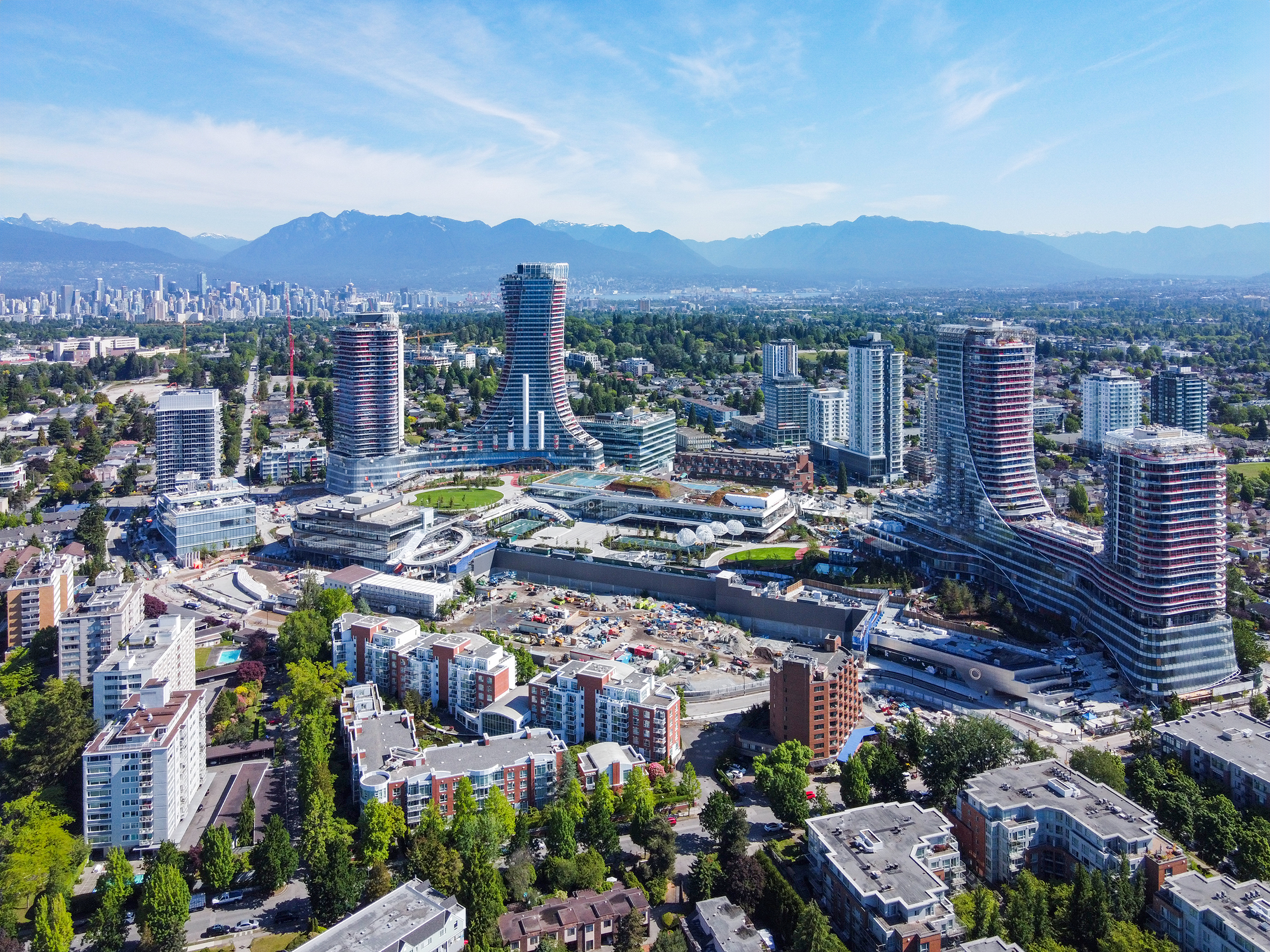
- Aerial view of Oakridge Park in May 2026
- Location: 650 W 41st Ave Vancouver, British Columbia V5Z 2M9, Canada
- Coordinates: 49.232°N 123.119°W
- Opened: 1959 (as Oakridge Centre); May 28, 2026 (as Oakridge Park)
- Renovated: 1984
- Demolished: 2020 (original mall)
- Previous names: Oakridge Centre
- Developer: Westbank/QuadReal
- Manager: QuadReal
- Owner: QuadReal
- Architect: Gregory Henriquez Henriquez Partners Architects (2014-present)
- Num. of stores: 140+ retailers
- Num. of anchor tenants: 7
- Floor area: 850,000 square feet
- Floors: 2
- Parking: 2,000 visitor spaces
- Public transit: Oakridge–41st Avenue Station; R4 41st Avenue RapidBus
- Website: oakridgepark.com

Oakridge Park (formerly known as Oakridge Centre) is a major mixed-use development and shopping centre in the Oakridge neighbourhood of Vancouver, British Columbia, Canada. It is located at the intersection of West 41st Avenue and Cambie Street. The site is being redeveloped through a CA$6.5 billion high-density urban complex featuring residential towers, office space, a community centre, a rooftop park, and a luxury retail district opening in phases. The first phase of the newly branded Oakridge Park opened in May 2026.

The original mall opened in 1959 and was anchored by Woodward's Stores until 1993, when Hudson's Bay acquired the company and became the mall's anchor tenant, along with Zellers and Safeway. It is one of the two largest malls in the city of Vancouver, alongside CF Pacific Centre, and together they are historically among the most profitable shopping centres in Canada.

== History ==
=== Oakridge Centre (1959–2020) ===
Oakridge Centre originally opened in 1959 as an open-air retail plaza, making it the first shopping centre built in Vancouver. Following the major renovation in 1984, it became a traditional enclosed shopping mall featuring extensive retail spaces, a food court, a soft play pit, a library, and office spaces. The mall was a filming location for TV shows including 21 Jump Street and Dead Like Me. Aritzia was founded in 1984 and set up its first store location there, while Lego in 2012 and Crate & Barrel in 2013 opened their first locations in British Columbia. An Apple retail store was also present, and a Target was originally planned to replace Zellers, but in 2015, Target Canada filed for bankruptcy protection and announced the closing of all stores. On September 15, 2020, it was announced that the mall would be closing on September 30 to demolish the structure to make way for the redevelopment. Crate & Barrel and the office towers would remain open during the construction.

=== Redevelopment (2020–present) ===
Oakridge Park is the over 5,000,000 sq ft (460,000 m^{2}) centre point for the Oakridge Municipal Town Centre Project, a Vancouver urban densification program aimed at creating a new transit-oriented, high density hub. It would be surrounded by condominiums, market rentals, affordable rentals, and social housing, much like Vancouver's West End, replacing a neighbourhood of single-family residences, centred around the Canada Line's Oakridge-41st station. Tower V will be the tallest building outside the downtown peninsula and, along with several other Oakridge Park towers, will be among the tallest buildings in Vancouver.

The redevelopment application was approved in 2014, and construction began in 2020. Designed by Vancouver design architects Henriquez Partners aided by executive architects Adamson Associates and Diamond Schmitt Architects, the project is estimated to have a project cost of CA$6.5 billion. It features an integrated city park with a 800 m (2,600 ft) continuous path for walking, running and cycling, a community centre, a luxury mall, a Time Out Market, a theatre, a library, a large daycare, performance venues, and commercial office space.

Hudson's Bay had originally signed on to anchor the new mall. However, in November 2024, they announced they were pulling out of the deal and would not be opening a store. Following this, it was announced that Altea Active would take over a 55,000 sq ft (5,100 m^{2}) portion of the second-level space previously designated for Hudson's Bay, with an expected opening in Spring 2027.

==== 2026 Opening and Tenants ====
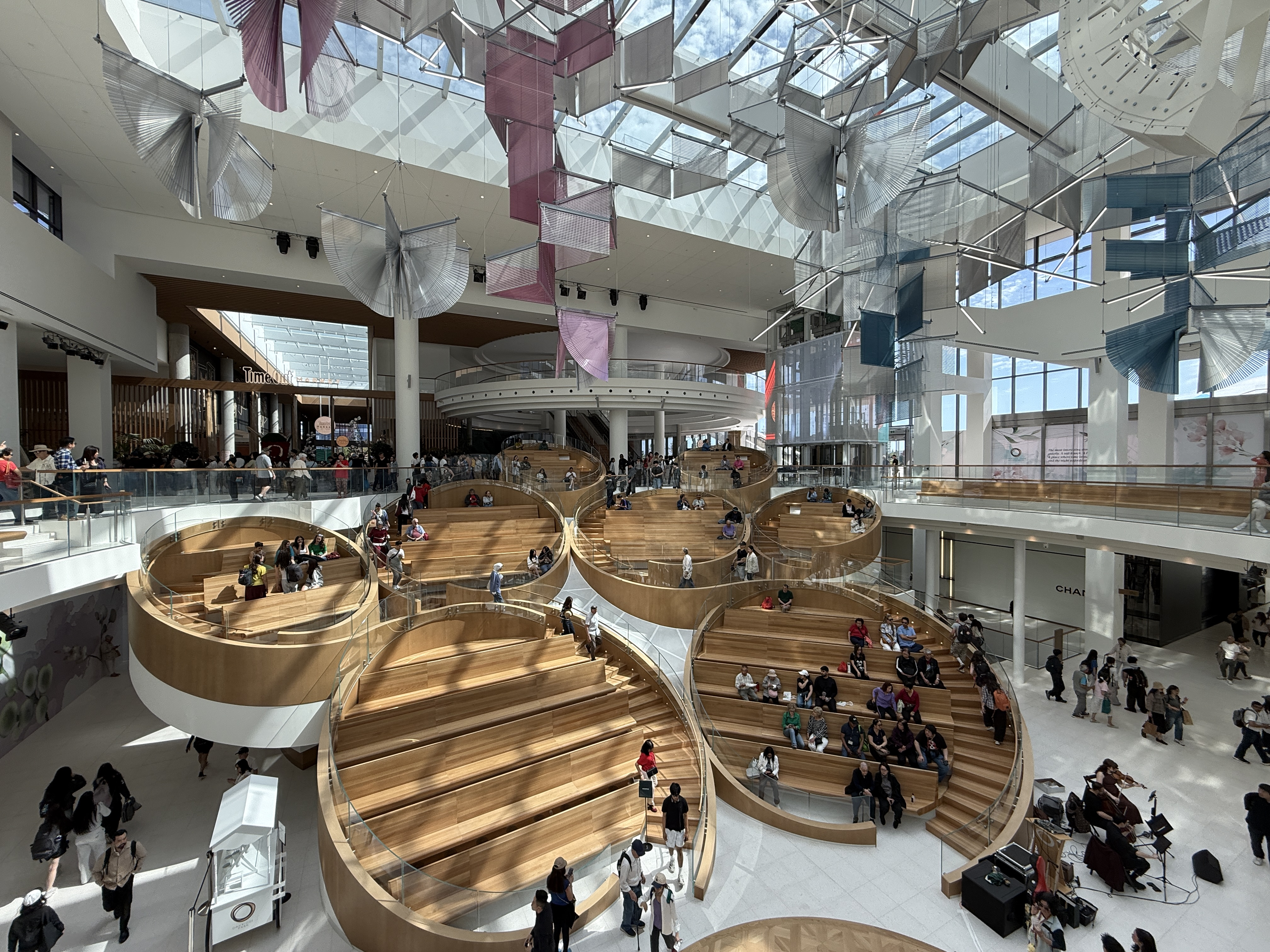
North Atrium

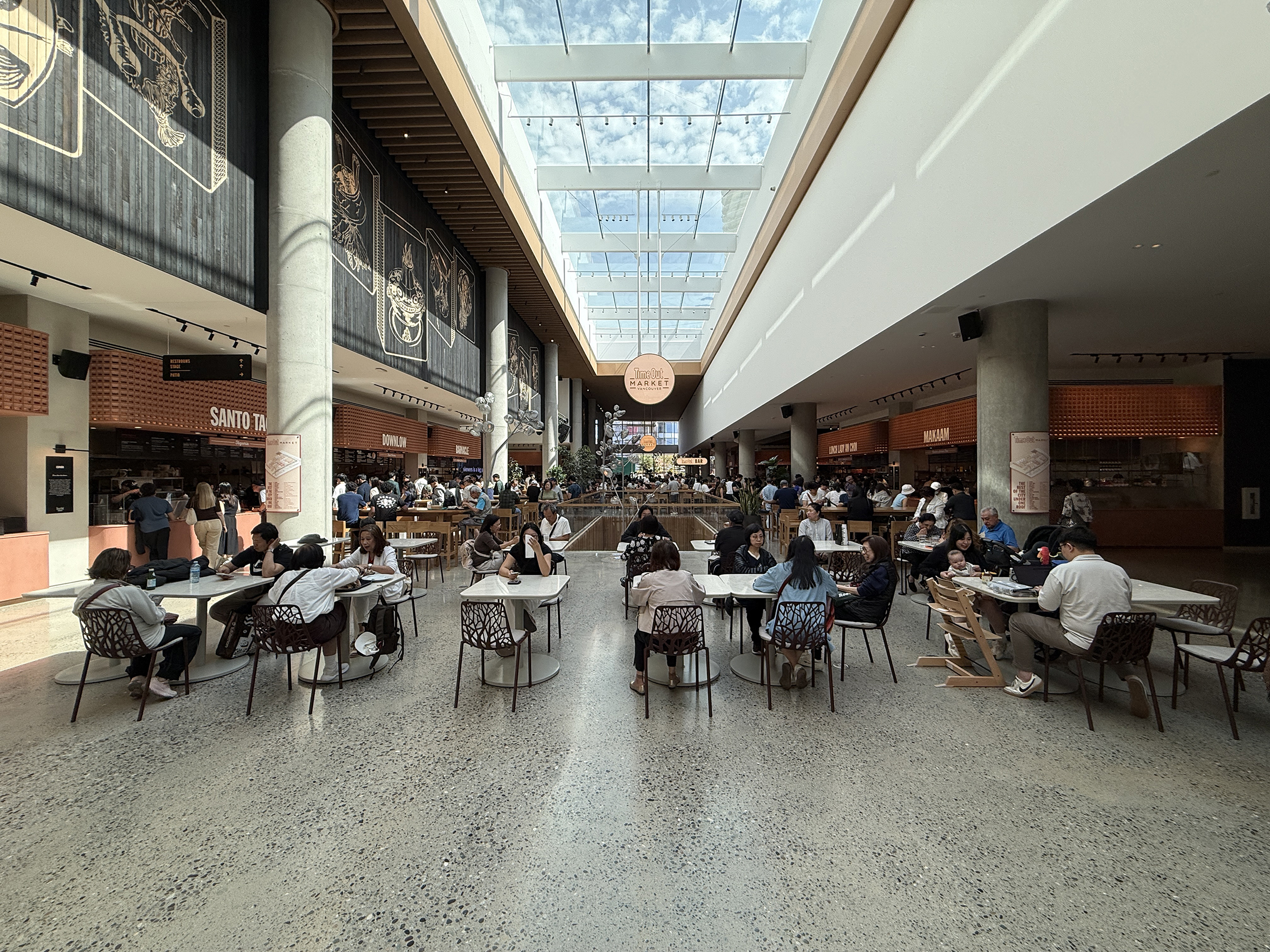
Time Out Market Vancouver in Level 2

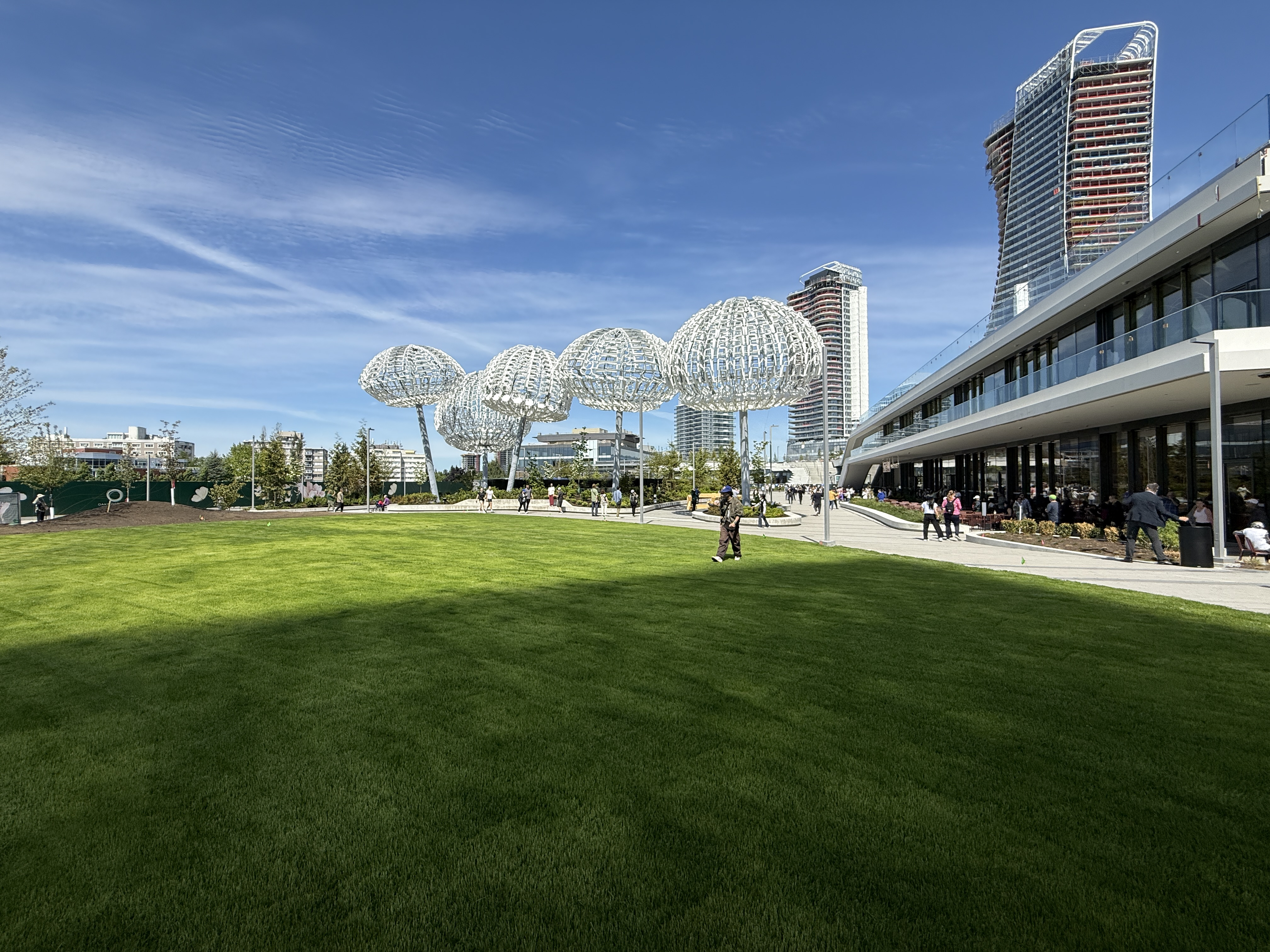
Public park on level 2

After multiple construction delays pushed back an initially planned 2020 completion of the North and South tower complexes, developers scheduled the official public opening of the mall's first phase for May 28, 2026. This launch consists of approximately 650,000 sq ft (60,000 m^{2}) of retail space and a significant portion of the 3.6 hectares (8.9 acres) rooftop municipal park.

The redeveloped mall emphasizes premium luxury, contemporary fashion, and lifestyle brands, featuring flagship and boutique locations for Louis Vuitton, Prada, Chanel, Loro Piana, Bulgari, Dolce & Gabbana, Ferragamo, and Versace, alongside popular contemporary brands like Aritzia and Lululemon. Food and beverage highlights include the 51,000 square feet (4,700 m^{2}) Time Out Market Vancouver, Delysees Champagne Bar, and the returning Peninsula Seafood Chinese Restaurant. Safeway, the mall's grocery anchor, opened on August 27, 2026, marking the flagship store's return to the mall after its previous location closed in January 2020.

In September 2026, Fairleigh Dickinson University relocated its Vancouver campus to Oakridge Park as the largest tenant with a 70,000 square feet (6,500 m^{2}) campus. The first wave of residential move-ins for the project's condominium towers is expected to begin in early 2027.

A 100,000 square feet (9,300 m^{2}) community centre and a new Vancouver Public Library branch is expected to open during the first half of 2027.

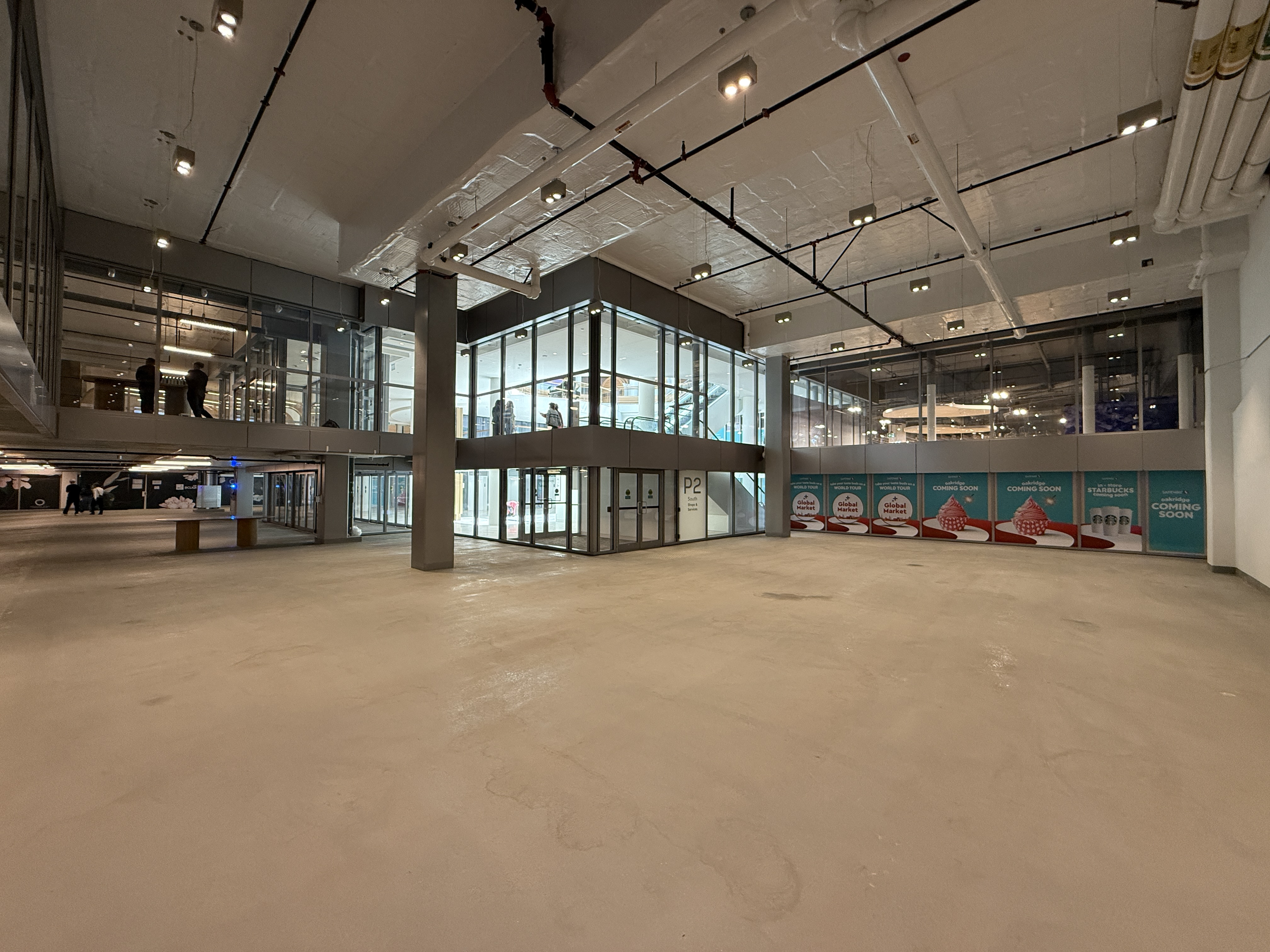
P2 level Safeway supermarket and carpark

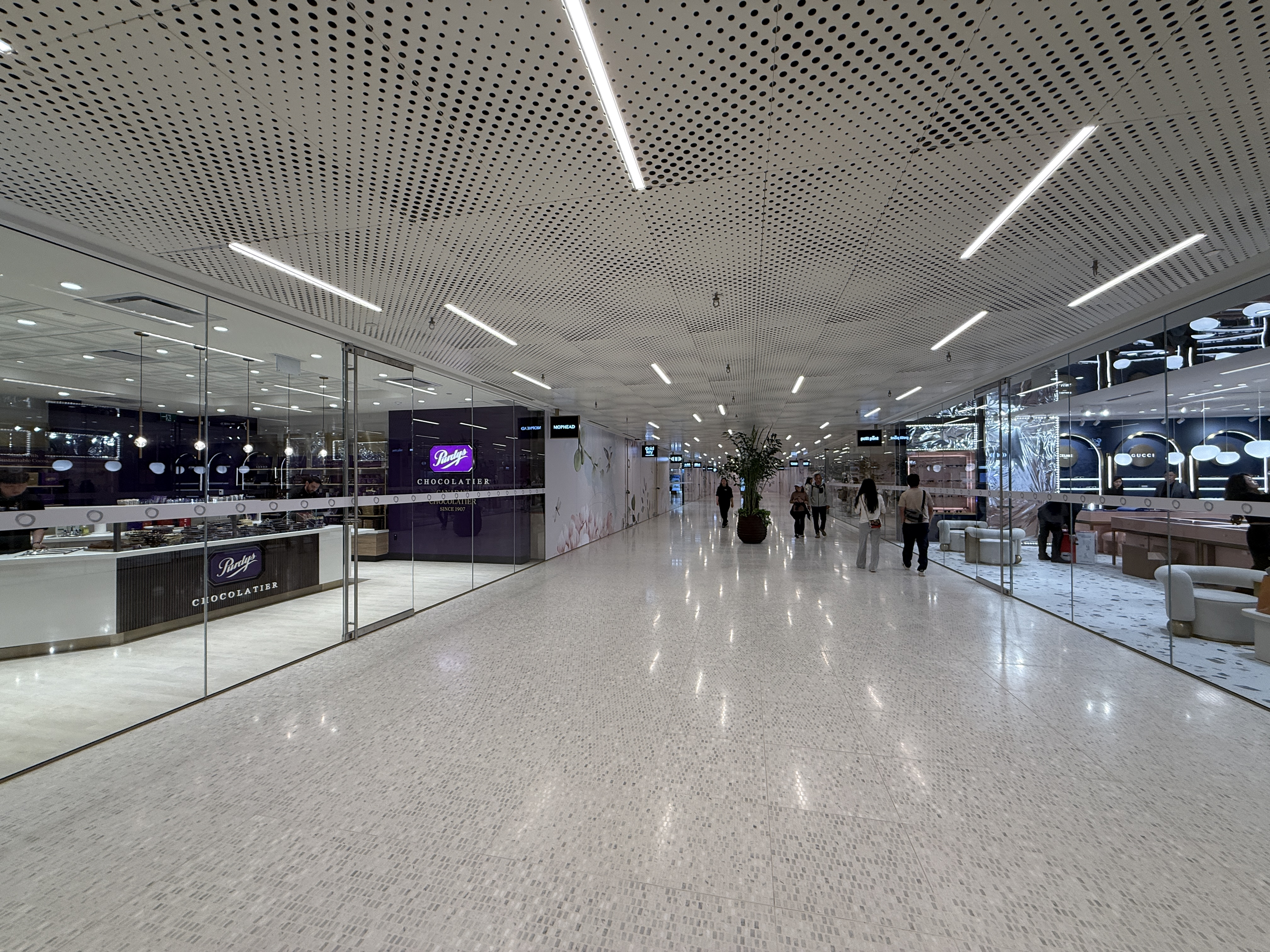
P1 Lower Galleria

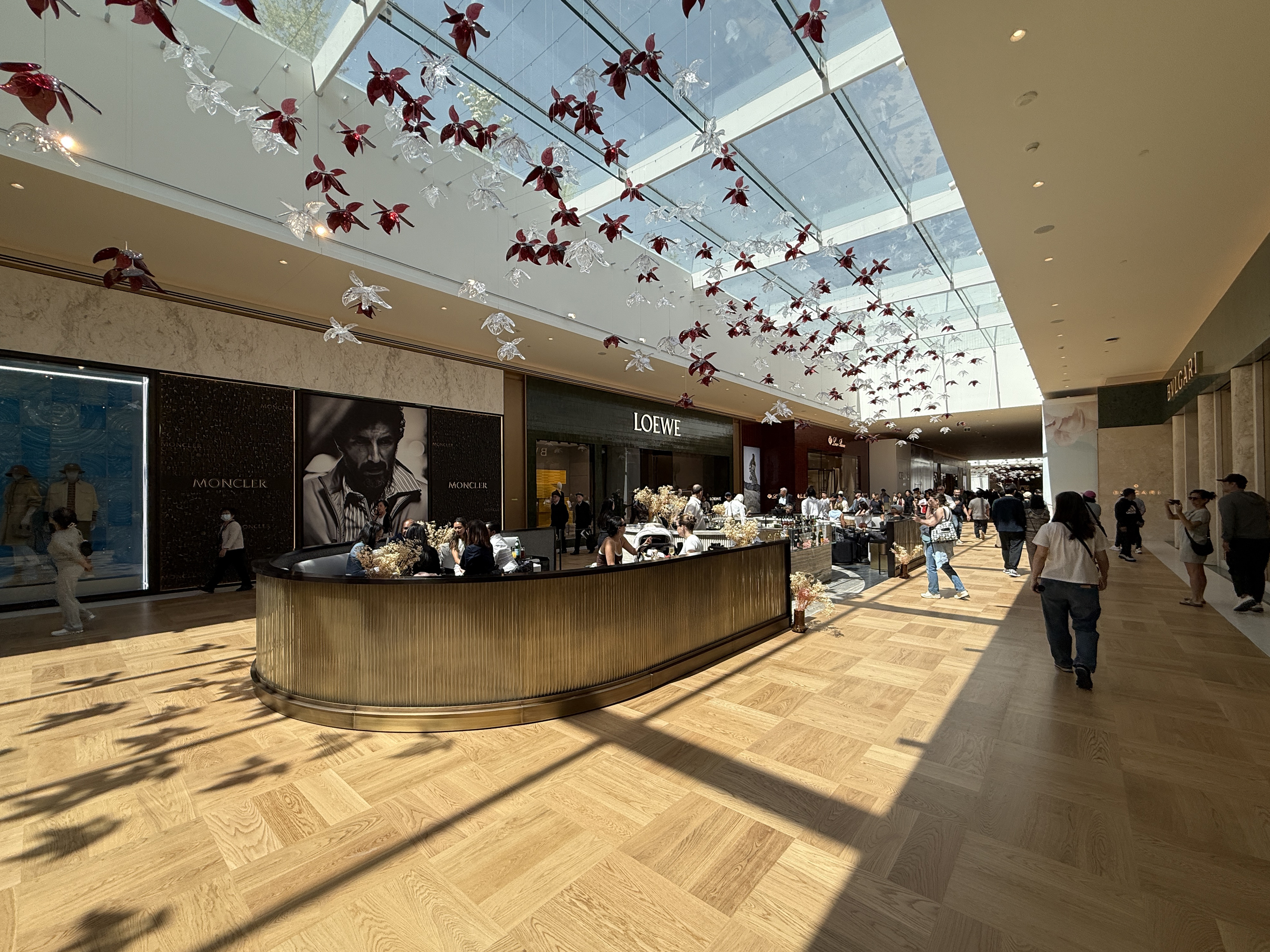
Level 1 West Galleria

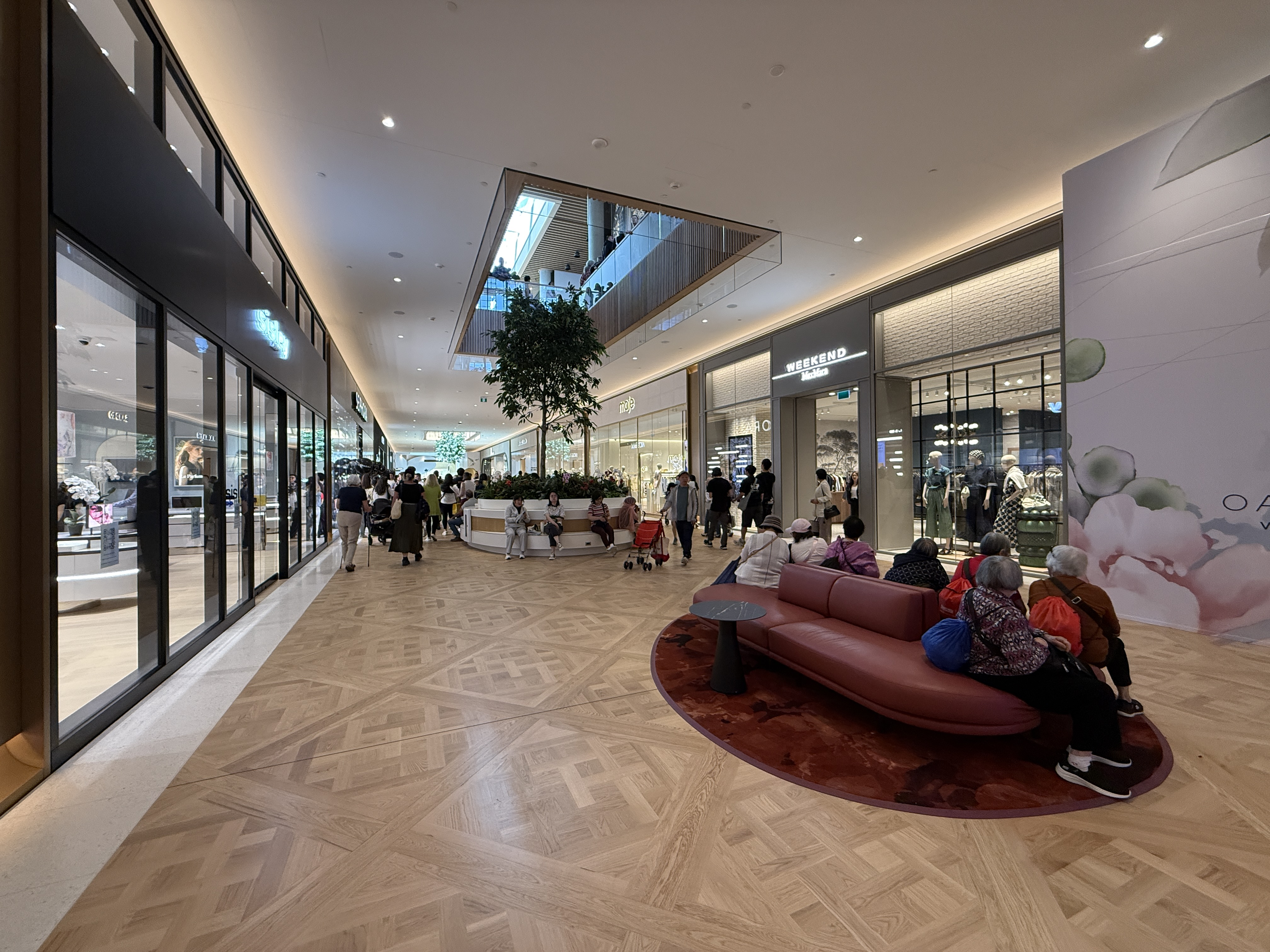
Level 1 East Galleria

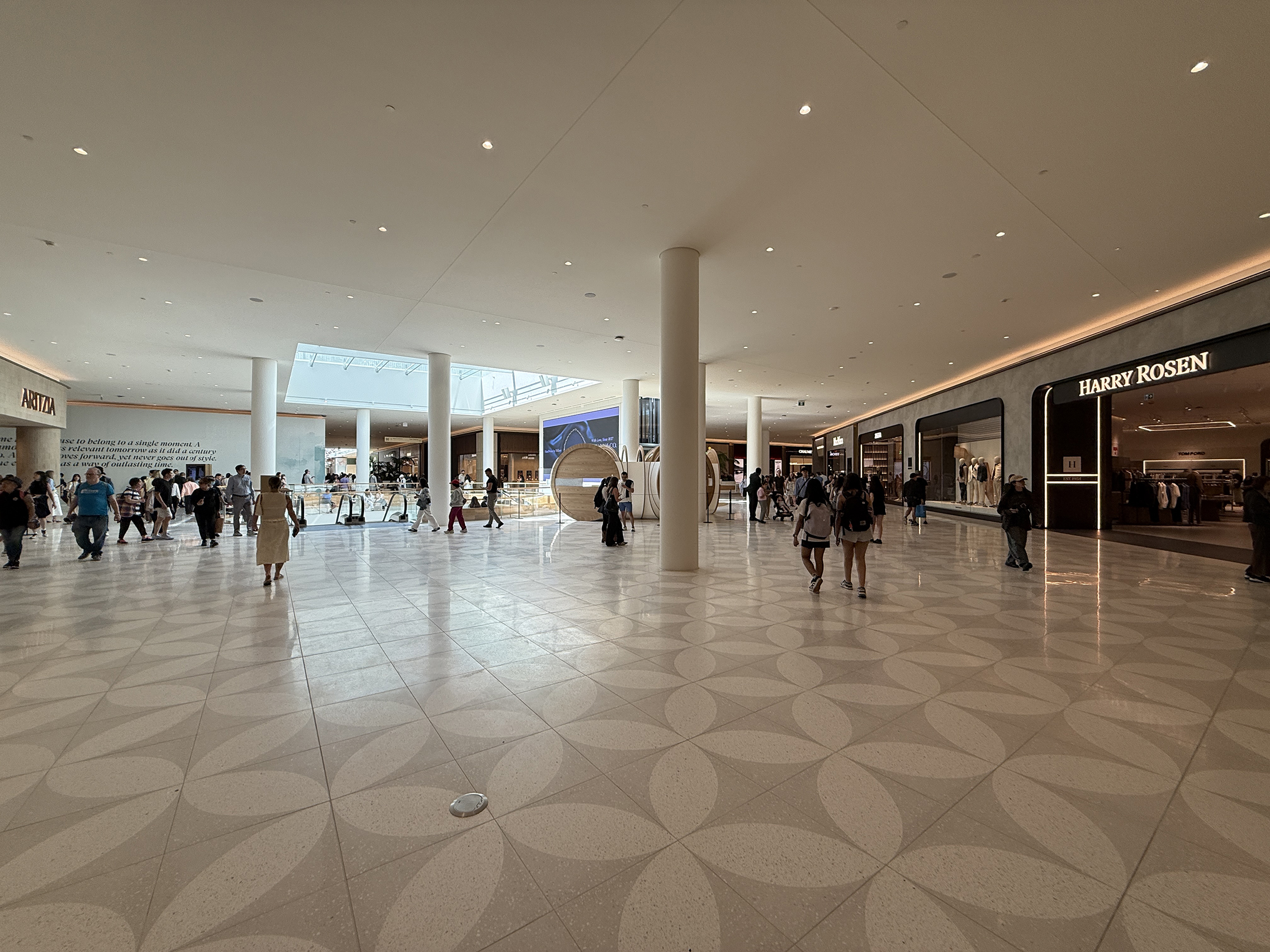
Level 1 South Galleria

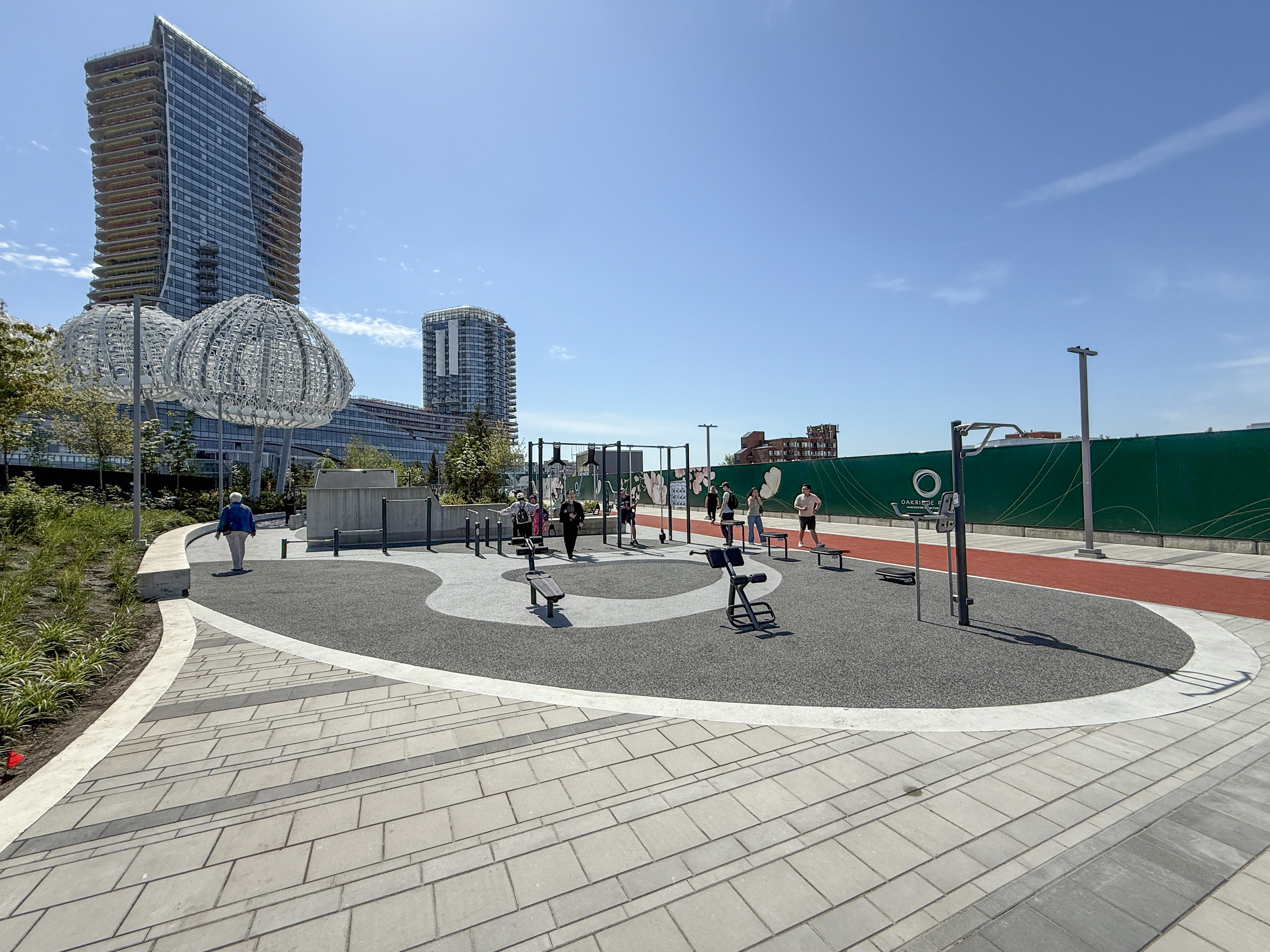
Outdoor fitness area in public park

== Reception ==
The new mall's tenant lineup drew in mixed public and analyst opinion both before and after its opening. In reader reactions collected by Daily Hive ahead of the launch, several Vancouver residents said the announced tenant list, which includes brands such as Dolce & Gabbana, Valentino, and Rolex, offered comparatively few affordable or casual options compared with the original Oakridge Centre.

Likewise, retail analysts were similarly divided on whether the development's high-end positioning would succeed. Ahead of the May 2026 opening, CBC News reported that industry observers questioned whether Vancouver's luxury consumer base was large enough to sustain the mall amid inflation and cost-of-living pressures.

== Transportation access ==
The Oakridge–41st Avenue station on the Canada Line is under the plaza at the southwest corner of 41st and Cambie. The mall is also served by TransLink bus service along 41st Avenue and Cambie Street.

As part of redevelopment, a major developer-funded upgrade of the SkyTrain station is scheduled to be completed in early 2027. This approximately $27 million project includes a new secondary underground entrance corridor connecting the station's concourse directly to the mall. The station expansion also adds two new street-level escalators, a new elevator, and a new roof for weather protection.

Underground parking can be accessed via 44th Avenue and Cambie Street, 45th Avenue and Cambie Street, or 41st Avenue and Heather Street. The first two underground parking levels provide 2,000 free, three-hour parking stalls. Due to the ongoing construction, several entrances and parking lots have been closed.

== Image gallery ==
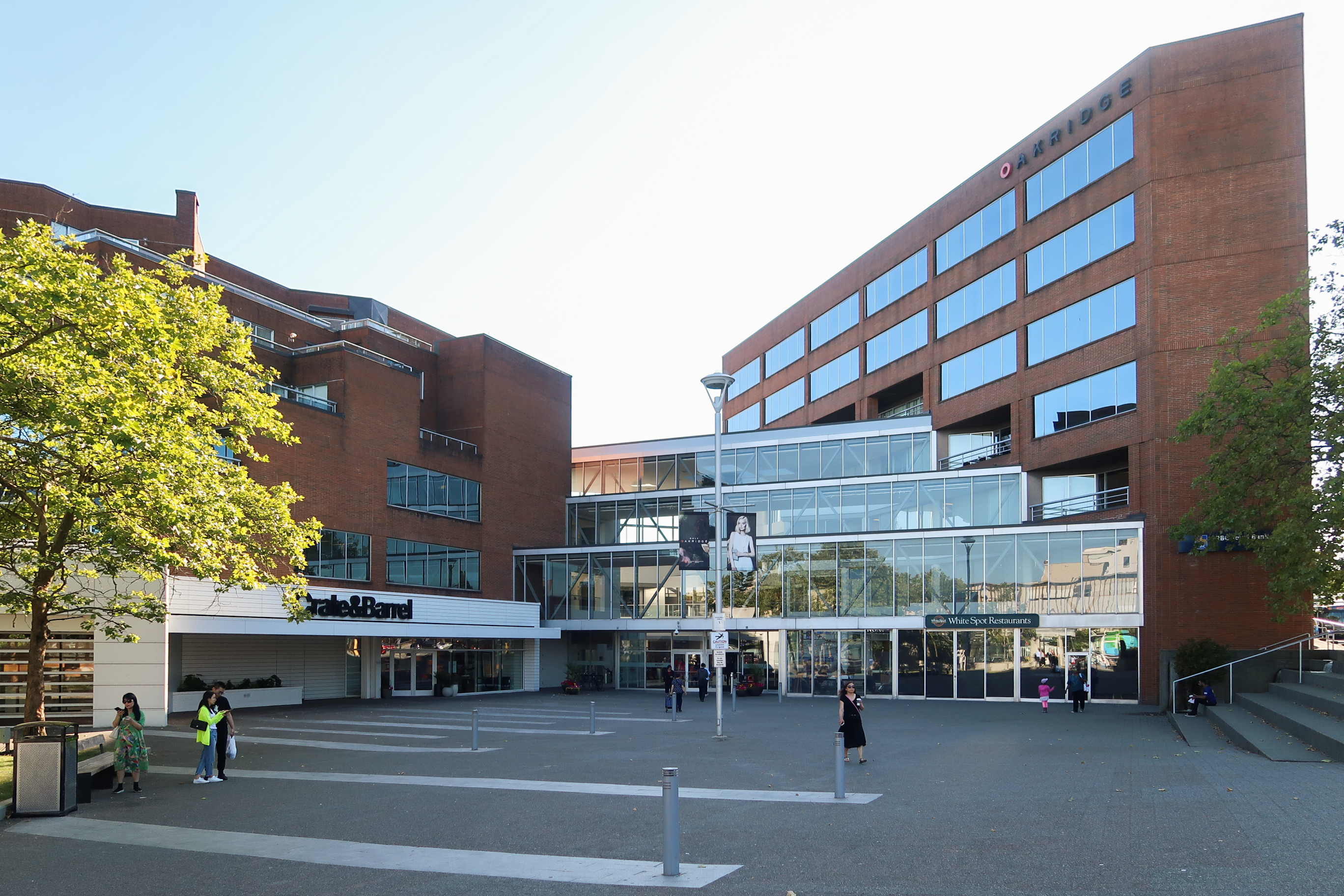
The main entrance to the former Oakridge Centre (2018)

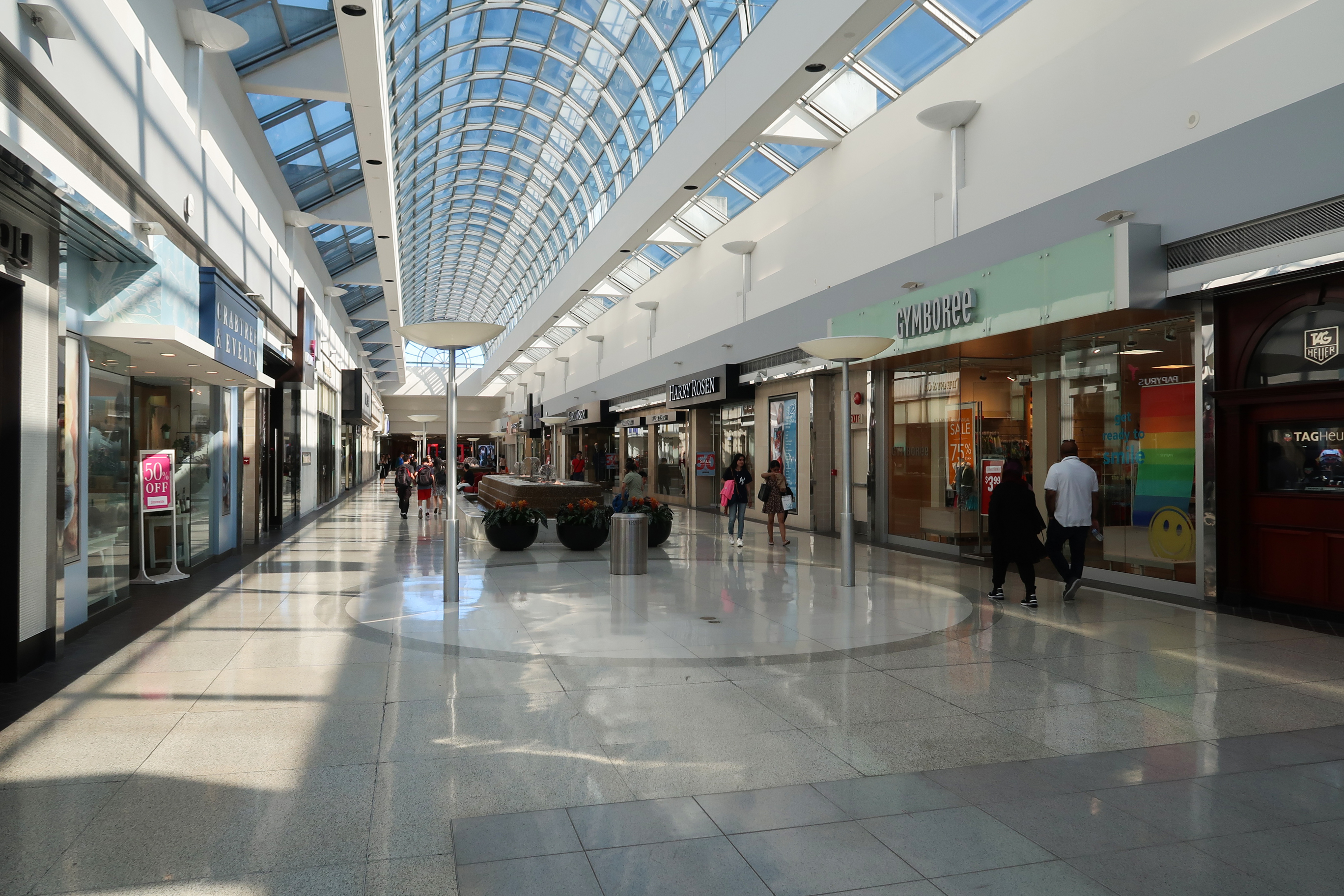
Former Oakridge Centre's interior

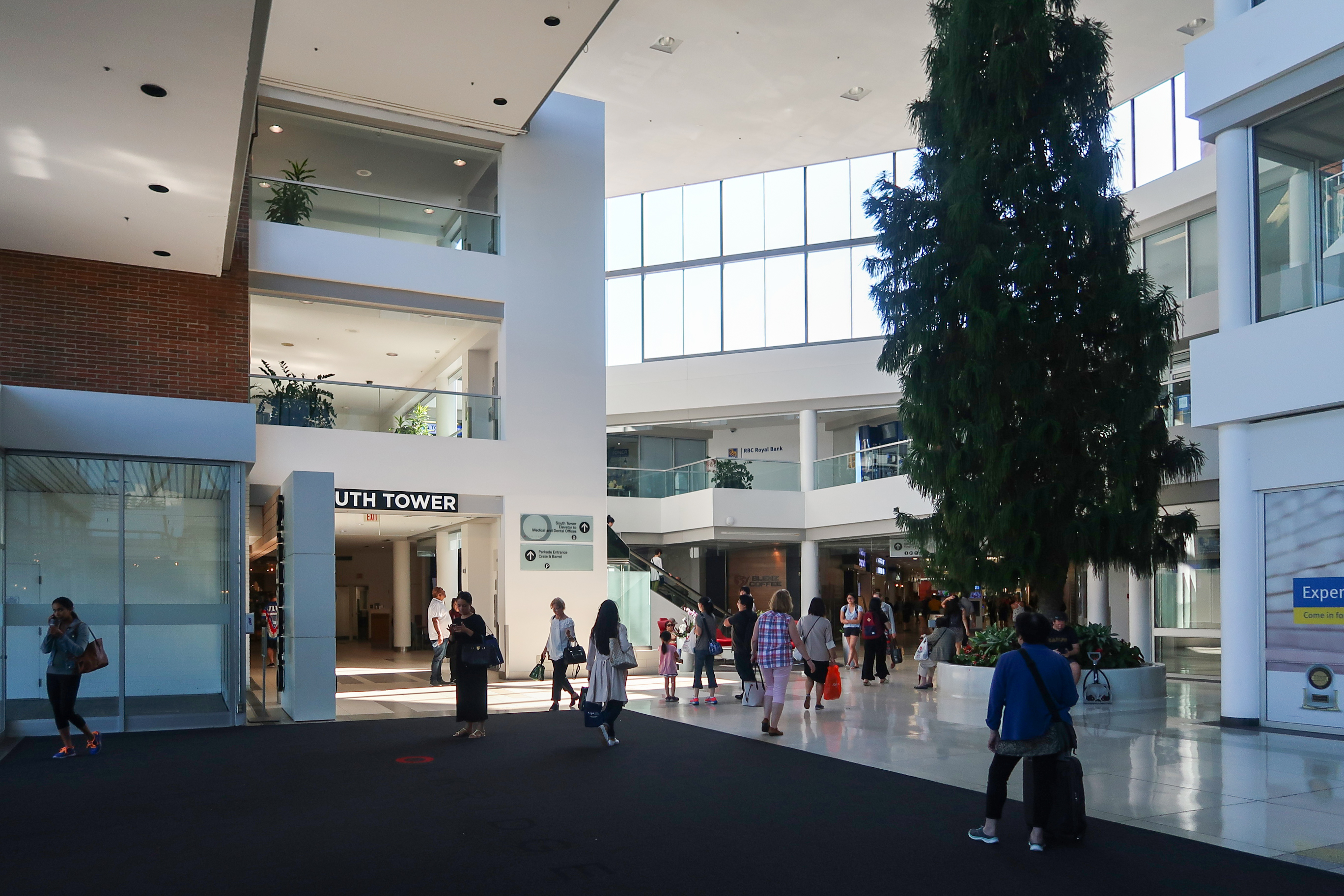
Former South Tower Lobby

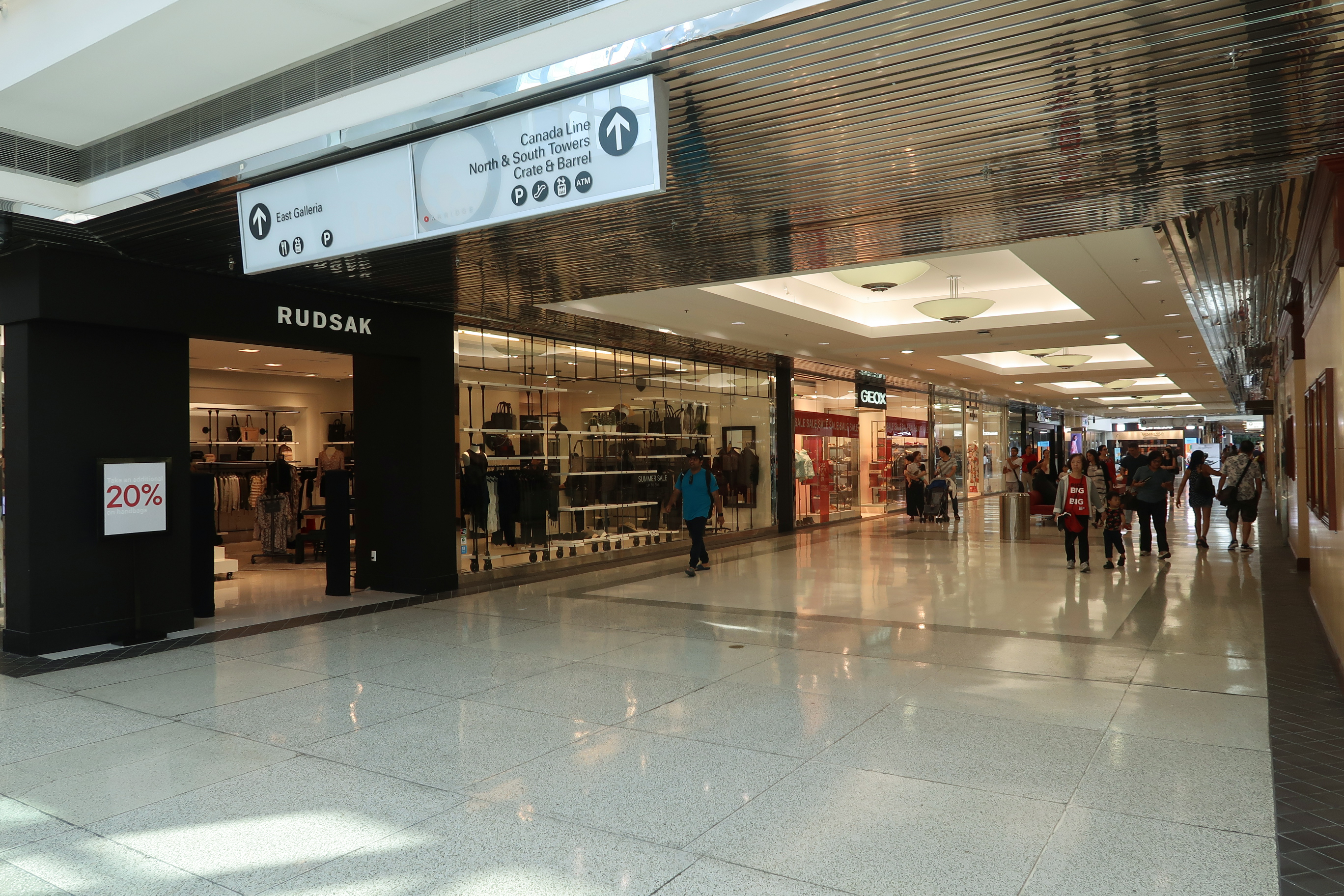
Former Mall

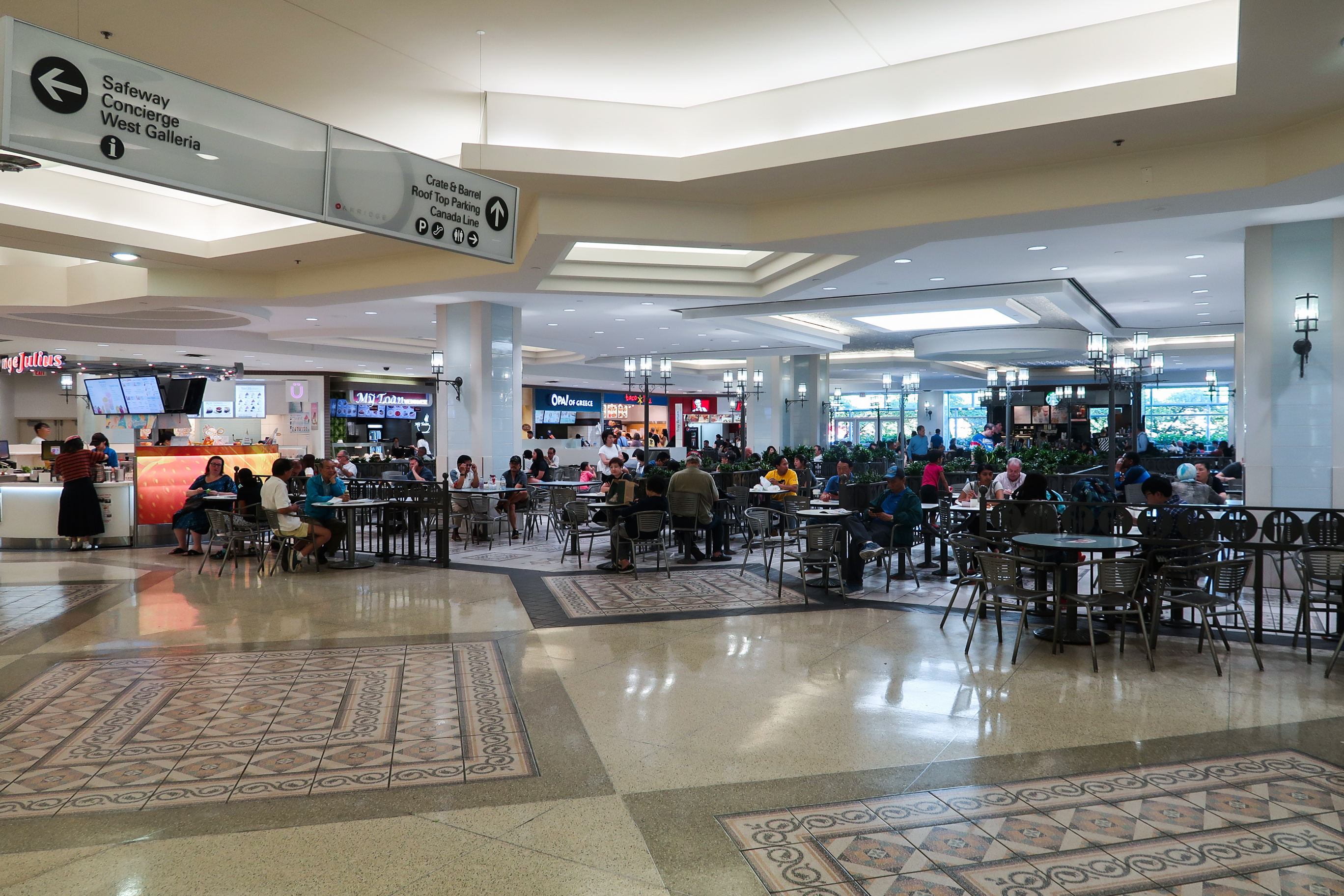
Former Food Court

== See also ==
- List of shopping malls in Canada
