= Aritzia =

Canadian clothing store chain

Aritzia LP

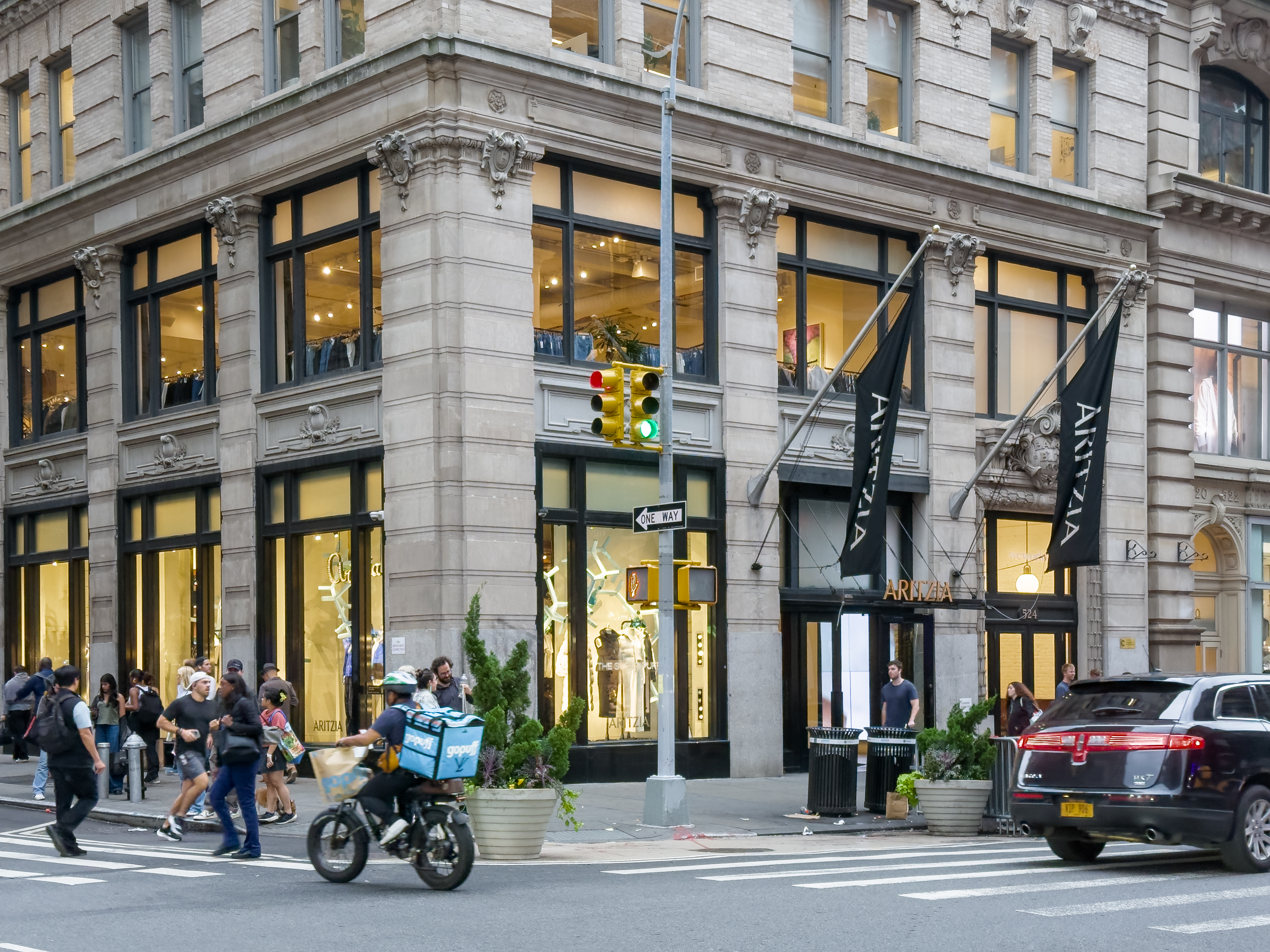
- Store in SoHo, Manhattan
- Type: Public
- Traded as: TSX: ATZ
- Industry: Clothing; Retail
- Founded: 1984
- Founder: Brian Hill
- Headquarters: Vancouver, British Columbia, Canada
- Number of locations: 101 (2021)
- Area served: North America
- Key people: Jennifer Wong (CEO)
- Products: Young women's clothing and fashion accessories Sportswear
- Revenue: ▲ C$2.20 billion (2022)
- Net income: ▲ C$0.19 billion (2022)
- Total assets: ▲ C$1.84 billion (2022)
- Total equity: ▲ C$0.69 billion (2022)
- Number of employees: 8,300
- Website: aritzia.com

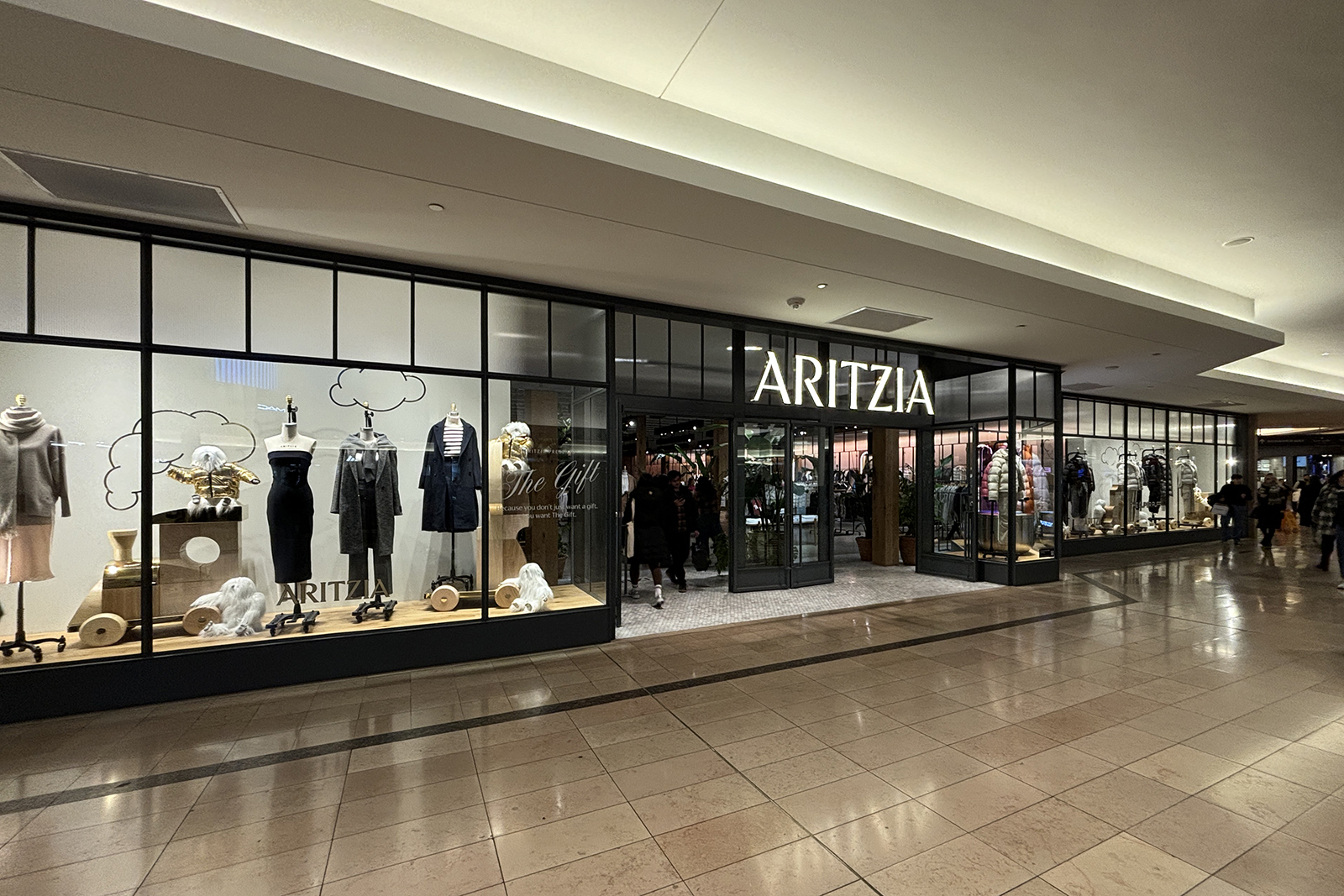
Aritzia store in Sherway Gardens, Toronto, Canada

Aritzia's previous logo

Aritzia LP is a Canadian clothing retail company founded in Vancouver, British Columbia, by businessman Brian Hill in 1984. Aritzia sells a variety of lifestyle apparel through various upscale retail stores across Canada, the United States, and online. Aritzia describes itself as an "everyday luxury" brand at attainable prices. The company has targeted $10.5 billion dollars in annual revenue by 2032.

== History ==
Aritzia opened its store in 1984 in Oakridge Centre, a shopping mall located on Vancouver's West Side. Since making national forays across the Canadian retail clothing landscape throughout the next two decades, the company opened its first U.S. stores in Seattle and Santa Clara in November 2007.

The company went public on October 3, 2016.

In 2019, major shareholder Berkshire Partners, an American private equity company, exited its stake.

In June 2021, Aritzia announced it would be acquiring Reigning Champ, a menswear-focused Canadian athleisure and streetwear brand, for $63 million.

In May 2022, Jennifer Wong took over as CEO, replacing longtime founder and executive chair Brian Hill. Prior to taking on the position of CEO, Wong held the role of COO at Aritzia since 2007. Wong joined the firm in 1987 as a sales associate at the Robson Street store in Vancouver, one of the first Aritzia's first flagship stores.

Aritzia announced its acquisition of the Fred Segal brand on February 19, 2026.

== Brands ==
Unlike other Canadian clothing retailers, Aritzia distinguishes itself by primarily selling its own in-house fashion brands, such as Wilfred, Wilfred Free, Le Fou by Wilfred, TNA, Golden, Talula, Babaton, The Group by Babaton, 1 -01 Babaton, Sunday Best, Main Character, Community, and Super Puff. In 2014, Aritzia introduced two handbag lines: SIXELEVEN and Auxiliary. Stores also carry clothing from labels such as Citizens of Humanity, Mackage, New Balance, Levi's, A Gold E, Havaianas, J Brand, Adidas, Herschel Supply Co., and rag & bone.

== Stores ==
The interior and exterior architectural configurations of Aritzia's stores are designed individually. After a location is hand-selected, a team of architects and interior designers create a bespoke look with a mixture of local influences, natural materials, custom furniture, and art. It is intentional that there are no mirrors in most of the dressing rooms, forcing shoppers to head into a communal space. (Each store has at least one dressing room with a permanent or roll-in mirror for those shoppers wanting additional privacy). Some locations have complimentary coffee bars or serve alcohol.

As of January 2021, Aritzia operates 101 stores in North America; 68 boutiques are located in Canada including 5 TNA stores, 8 Wilfred stores, and 4 Babaton stores. There are 44 Aritzia stores in the US, including a 13,000 square-foot flagship location in Manhattan, New York City.

In January 2017, Aritzia announced the opening of a flagship store in Chicago on Rush Street.

Aritzia announced in November 2025, that they were one of the four retailers replacing the Nordstrom Department Store space in downtown Vancouver. The space is set to be a 40,000-square-foot flagship store, with plans featuring a "casual-yet elevated dining experience".

== E-commerce ==
In November 2012, Aritzia launched the aritzia.com e-commerce site. It also provided a digital magazine with artist profiles and galleries of clothing trends.
