= Brian W. Hill =

British historian (1932–2023)

Brian William Hill (1932 – 16 July 2023) was an historian of eighteenth century Britain and a biographer of Robert Harley and Robert Walpole.

He was awarded a doctorate from the University of Cambridge and was Reader in History at the University of East Anglia before his retirement.

Hill argued in his book The Growth of Parliamentary Parties that political parties survived after George I's accession in 1714 due to the continuing relevance of political and religious issues that had divided parties since the Exclusion Crisis and the Glorious Revolution.

== Works ==
- The Growth of Parliamentary Parties, 1689-1742 (London: Allen & Unwin, 1976).
- British Parliamentary Parties, 1742-1832: From the Fall of Walpole to the First Reform Act (London: HarperCollins, 1985).
- Robert Harley: Speaker, Secretary of State and Premier Minister (Yale: Yale University Press, 1988).
- Sir Robert Walpole: Sole and Prime Minister (London: Hamish Hamilton, 1989).
- The Early Parties and Politics in Britain, 1688-1832 (London: Palgrave Macmillan, 1996).
